= West Indian cricket team in England in 1988 =

Series of 16 first-class cricket matches

West Indians in England in 1988
	West Indies	England
- Dates: 7 May – 8 August 1988
Captains	IVA Richards	MW Gatting; JE Emburey; CS Cowdrey; GA Gooch

Test series
- Result: West Indies won the 5-match series 4–0
Most runs	AL Logie (364)	GA Gooch (459)
Most wickets	MD Marshall (35)	GR Dilley (15)
- Player of the series: GA Gooch (Eng) and MD Marshall (WI)

One Day International series
- Results: England won the 3-match series 3–0
Most runs	CG Greenidge (78)	MW Gatting (140)
Most wickets	IR Bishop (4)	GC Small (6)
- Player of the series: MW Gatting (Eng) and MD Marshall (WI)

The West Indian cricket team played 16 first-class cricket matches in England in 1988, under the captaincy of Viv Richards. They enjoyed considerable success during the tour, while England endured a "disastrous summer" of continuous change.

England easily won the initial three-match One Day International (ODI) series, retaining the Texaco Trophy and raising expectations for a successful summer in the five-match Test series to follow. However, the West Indies comfortably retained the Wisden Trophy by winning the Test series 4–0. The players of the Test series were Malcolm Marshall for West Indies for his 35 wickets and Graham Gooch for England, who scored 459 runs and ended the summer as captain.

In Test match cricket, the captain is an important role and one which is usually relatively stable. This tour has become known in cricketing circles as the "summer of four captains" as England used four different captains in the five Test matches. The win set a high water mark for West Indian fortunes in Test cricket in England. The 1988 series proved to be the culmination of a 25-year run of almost uninterrupted success, but they have failed to win a single series in England in the 38 subsequent years.

== West Indian team ==
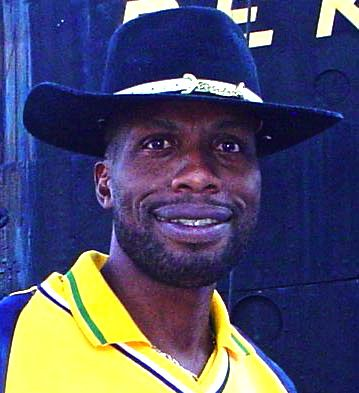
The 1988 tour was Curtly Ambrose's first for West Indies.

By the summer of 1988, the West Indies had experienced nearly ten years as the best Test team in world cricket, including a streak of winning 10 of 11 Test series they played from 1980 to 1985–86 (the other was drawn). However, the West Indies side that had enjoyed this considerable recent success was beginning to show signs of ageing. The experienced batsmen Viv Richards (the captain), Gordon Greenidge, Jeff Dujon, and Desmond Haynes were aged 36, 37, 32, and 32 respectively at the start of the Test series, and bowlers Michael Holding and Joel Garner and batsman Larry Gomes had recently retired. As a result, the squad arrived with an inexperienced group of pace bowlers: supporting Malcolm Marshall, a veteran of 53 Tests, were relative newcomers Courtney Walsh (20 Tests), Patrick Patterson (11), Winston Benjamin (4), Curtly Ambrose (3) and Ian Bishop (0).

The West Indies' most recent series had been an "epic" 1–1 draw at home against Pakistan, but their previous two Test series against England had both resulted in 5–0 victories. The first of these, in England in 1984, was the first whitewash England had suffered since the 1920–21 season when England toured Australia, while the second occurred in the Caribbean in 1985–86. These two one-sided victories by the West Indies became known as "blackwashes".

== English team ==
By contrast, the English team had suffered a run of bad performances spanning several years, winning only seven of their previous 52 Tests. The England side had most recently toured Australia, drawing the Bicentennial Test and losing the only One Day International played, and New Zealand, drawing all three Test matches and sharing the ODIs 2–2. Before this, they had endured a "hostile" and highly controversial tour of Pakistan, during which an argument between captain Mike Gatting and umpire Shakoor Rana had led to a diplomatic incident. The three match series was lost 1–0, but the "teasing, taunting ... bemusing" performance of leg-spinner Abdul Qadir, who took 30 wickets in three Tests, was unlikely to be repeated, given that the West Indies' only specialist spinner was Roger Harper, an off-break bowler.

Despite having lost 5–0 to the West Indies in each of the two most recent series, England had grounds for optimism, following good performances in the shorter form of the game: the team had reached the World Cup Final the previous year, losing to Australia. Writing in the Daily Mirror, Mike Bowen disparaged Gatting's captaincy, but talked up England's chances, based on their batting line-up. Gatting entered the summer as incumbent, but his position had been undermined by poor England Test performances and his on-field spat with Shakoor Rana. As such, he had been appointed captain only for the Texaco Trophy.

== England's "summer of four captains" ==
As the series unfolded, England were dominated by the West Indians in what Andrew Miller and Martin Williamson of ESPNcricinfo described as "the crazy summer of 1988". The cadence of the summer's contest was summed up for Wisden by Tony Cozier: "The morale and reputation of English cricket has seldom been as severely bruised as it was during the 1988 Cornhill Insurance Test series against West Indies".

The significance of there being four captains in just five Test matches can better be understood with context. The captain of a cricket team performs a vital role. Cricket captains have responsibility for strategy and tactics, and the England captain may also have an important say in team selection. Traditionally, captains of international teams are not changed frequently – for example, during the entire decade of the 1970s, only seven different men captained England, and from 1984 to 1994 the Australian Test team had just one captain: Allan Border, yet there were four English Test captains in just a few weeks in the summer of 1988.

England captains during the tour
Captained	Name	Age	County	Tests as captain
First Test	Mike Gatting	31	Middlesex	23
Second Test	John Emburey	35	Middlesex	2
Third Test	John Emburey	35	Middlesex	2
Fourth Test	Chris Cowdrey	30	Kent	1
Fifth Test	Graham Gooch	35	Essex	34

The many changes of captain over the summer reflected uncertainty in the English cricketing establishment as to how to respond to the drubbing the team was receiving from the West Indies; as Cozier put it, the selectors "did not seem to know where to turn, either for a new captain or for a settled team".

The England team had not suffered such uncertainty since the West Indies tour of England in 1966, where the selectors chose three different captains (Colin Cowdrey, M. J. K. Smith and Brian Close) and England lost the five-Test series 3–1. Coincidentally, Peter May was on the Board of Selectors for the 1966 series, while he was chairman of the Board of Selectors for the 1988 series.

== Statistical summary ==
Before the Test series began, the West Indian cricket team played three One Day Internationals against England in May 1988. All of the ODIs were won by England, largely thanks to disciplined, economical bowling by Gladstone Small, Phil DeFreitas and Derek Pringle throughout and good batting performances from Gatting in the First (82*) and Third (40*) ODIs. England retained the Texaco Trophy.

One Day International summary
ODI	Ground	Result	Date	
First	Edgbaston	England won by 6 wickets	19 May	Scorecard
Second	Headingley	England won by 47 runs	21 May	Scorecard
Third	Lord's	England won by 7 wickets	23, 24 May	Scorecard

The ODIs were followed by five Test matches. The First Test was drawn, and the remaining four Tests were all won convincingly by the West Indies.

Test match summary
Test	Ground	Result	Dates	
First	Trent Bridge	Match drawn	2–7 June	Scorecard
Second	Lord's	West Indies won by 134 runs	16–21 June	Scorecard
Third	Old Trafford	West Indies won by an innings and 156 runs	30 June – 5 July	Scorecard
Fourth	Headingley	West Indies won by ten wickets	21–26 July	Scorecard
Fifth	The Oval	West Indies won by eight wickets	4–8 August	Scorecard

The West Indies played 11 first-class matches, in addition to the five Tests, defeating Somerset in May and Kent in June. The other nine first-class matches, and the First Test, were all drawn: Sussex, Gloucestershire, Worcestershire, Lancashire, Northamptonshire, Leicestershire, Glamorgan, Nottinghamshire, and Essex. During the match against Gloucestershire at Bristol, immediately after the ODI series, Phil Simmons suffered a horrific injury, receiving a ball to the head from bowler David Lawrence. Not wearing a helmet, the blow caused his heart to stop and he had to be taken to hospital where he underwent emergency brain surgery. He missed the rest of the tour, but made a full recovery in time for the 1991 West Indies tour of England.

In addition to the One Day Internationals, there were four other non-first-class fixtures. West Indies beat Lavinia, Duchess of Norfolk's XI in a 40-over match, Hampshire in a 50-over match and a combined Oxford and Cambridge Universities team over two days; they also drew with Minor Counties in a two-day match.

Jeffrey Dujon was selected as one of the Wisden Cricketers of the Year for his performances during the 1988 season. The article in the 1989 edition said that his "value was repeatedly emphasised" during the 1988 series and that his performances "invariably steadied the innings; he held twenty catches and missed little."

== One Day Internationals ==
England won the Texaco Trophy 3–0.

=== 1st ODI ===
19 May 1988
Scorecard

West Indies; 217 (55 overs)	v	England; 219/4 (53 overs)
AL Logie 51 (96); CL Hooper 51 (96); GC Small 4/31 (11 overs)		MW Gatting 82* (125); CL Hooper 1/24 (6 overs)

England won by 6 wickets
Edgbaston, Birmingham
Umpires: J Birkenshaw and BJ Meyer
Player of the match: GC Small (ENG)

- England won the toss and elected to field.
- MA Lynch (ENG) made his ODI debut.

England omitted Eddie Hemmings, Bill Athey and Neal Radford from their squad of 14. They won the toss and elected to put the West Indies in to bat. Simmons and Greenidge made a first-wicket partnership of 34 before the former was caught by Allan Lamb off the bowling of Graham Dilley. Bowling alternate overs, Pringle and Small then dismissed Greenidge, Richards and Richie Richardson, leaving the West Indies on 72 for four. Gus Logie and Carl Hooper were restricted to singles as the England captain Gatting kept a tight in-field. Hooper made his half-century before being dismissed one run later, caught by John Emburey off the bowling of Small. Logie fell to Small 11 runs later, caught behind, with the score on 180 for six. The West Indies tail-enders provided little resistance to England, and the innings concluded with the visitors being dismissed for 217 off the last ball.

In reply, Graham Gooch and Chris Broad had a confident start and made an opening partnership of 70 before Broad was caught by Greenidge off Marshall's bowling. With the West Indies focus on restricting Gatting, Gooch was able to progress relatively unhindered but was dismissed for 43 by Ambrose, caught by Harper, and England were 119 for two. Then, described by Mike Selvey, writing in The Guardian, as a "loony period of kamikaze running", Monte Lynch was run out on his debut while both Gatting and Lamb narrowly avoided a similar fate. The latter was bowled by Hooper on 11, with England then 153 for four. Gatting, partnered by Pringle, made his fifty, and guided England to the total required with two overs to spare, winning the match by six wickets. Small was named man of the match for what Selvey described as "inspired bowling".

=== 2nd ODI ===
21 May 1988
Scorecard

England; 186/8 (55 overs)	v	West Indies; 139 (46.3 overs)
DR Pringle 39 (55); MD Marshall 2/29 (9 overs)		IVA Richards 31 (29); DR Pringle 3/30 (11 overs)

England won by 47 runs
Headingley, Leeds
Umpires: DJ Constant and DR Shepherd
Player of the match: DR Pringle (ENG)

- West Indies won the toss and elected to field.
- IR Bishop (WIN) made his ODI debut.

The second ODI, at Headingley, saw the West Indies win the toss and elect to field. They dropped Harper to play four fast bowlers, yet Gooch and Broad made a steady start, scoring 17 off the first three overs. Scyld Berry described the subsequent period of batting as "one awful struggle against the fast bowlers" and compared it to Test match play. When Gatting was caught by Richards off Marshall's bowling, England were 64 for two, Lynch, Lamb and Gooch all failed to make an impression as their team collapsed to 83 for five. Pringle and Paul Downton then put on a sixth-wicket partnership of 66 before the former was caught behind by Dujon. Berry noted that Richards' insistence on bowling himself denied "his best bowlers" six overs. Downton made 30 before falling to Bishop with England on 154 for seven, but with DeFreitas making 15, supported by Emburey and Small, England concluded their innings on 186 for eight.

The West Indies made a poor start to their reply, losing Simmons, Richardson and Greenidge to be 38 for three. Despite some resistance from their captain Richards, he was bowled by Small after making a quick 31, and with Logie with Lynch catching from Dilley's bowling, the visitors were 67 for five. Dujon made 12 before being bowled by Pringle, and Marshall was by Gooch for 1. Hooper made 12 before being caught leg before wicket by Pringle, and despite a 28-run ninth wicket partnership between Ambrose and Walsh, the West Indies were bowled out in the 47th over, on 139, to lose the second ODI by 47 runs. Pringle, scoring 39 with the bat and with bowling figures of 3 for 30, was named man of the match.

=== 3rd ODI ===
23, 24 May 1988
Scorecard

West Indies; 178/7 (55 overs)	v	England; 180/3 (50 overs)
MD Marshall 41 (30); JE Emburey 2/53 (10 overs)		MW Gatting 40* (58); IR Bishop 2/33 (11 overs)

England won by 7 wickets
Lord's, London
Umpires: HD Bird and NT Plews
Player of the match: PAJ DeFreitas (ENG)

- England won the toss and elected to field.
- Reserve day used. West Indies were 125/6 (50 overs) at the close of the first day.

The third ODI, at Lord's, saw Radford replace Dilley for England, the latter suffering from a "viral complaint". The match was disrupted several times by rain: a single ball was bowled by England, who had won the toss and elected to field, before the first weather delay of the day curtailed play. A first-wicket partnership of 40 between Greenidge and Haynes was followed by poor innings from Richardson, Logie and Richards, whose wicket fell after making 13 runs from 46 deliveries, with the West Indies on 95 for five. Hooper was then run out on 12 before the innings was brought to an early close due to poor weather, on 125 for six, with five overs remaining. The following morning, Marshall and Dujon took the attack to England and scored 53 runs in the final overs, ending the West Indies innings on 178 for seven. Gooch and Broad made a 71-run opening partnership before the former was stumped off Hooper's bowling. Broad was dismissed with England on 108 for two, but Gatting and Lynch, then Lamb, saw England reach the total with relative ease, winning by seven wickets with five overs to spare. The West Indies conceded the highest number of extras in the ODI format, conceding 42 runs mainly from leg byes and no balls. DeFreitas was named man of the match as England whitewashed the one-day series against the West Indies for the first time ever.

== Test matches ==
=== First Test ===
2–7 June
Scorecard

England	v	West Indies
245 (101 overs); GA Gooch 73 (131); MD Marshall 6/69 (30 overs)		448/9d (129.1 overs); CL Hooper 84 (147); PW Jarvis 2/63 (18.1 overs)
301/3 (108 overs); GA Gooch 146 (303); MD Marshall 1/23 (13 overs)

Match drawn
Trent Bridge, Nottingham, England
Umpires: HD Bird (Eng) and J Birkenshaw (Eng)
Player of the match: MD Marshall (WI)

- 5 June was a rest day

Gatting was the incumbent England captain for the First Test at Trent Bridge. England won the toss and elected to bat, making 220 for five on the first day, with an opening partnership of 125 between Gooch and Broad. Marshall picked up four wickets, including England's top three, with Ambrose claiming the fifth wicket. Play was extended by thirty minutes due to the slow over rate of the West Indies. The West Indies dominated the second day, with Ambrose and Marshall taking the remaining five wickets for 22 runs, the latter taking 6 wickets for 69 runs. In reply, Greenidge and Haynes made a first-wicket partnership of 54 against the bowling of Dilley and DeFreitas, before Greenidge was caught behind from the bowling of Paul Jarvis. Richardson was then caught by Gatting off Emburey for 17. Richards entered the field and between him and Haynes, took the West Indies to 125 for two by close of play. Day three was rain-affected, with England managing to take the wickets of Richards and Haynes, but only after both had made half-centuries. Play closed early due to the inclement weather with the West Indies on 264 for 4, holding a lead of 19 with six wickets remaining. A rest day followed the third day, and on day four, the West Indies extended their lead over England. With 80 from Hooper, and an eighth-wicket partnership of 91 between Ambrose and Marshall, Richards declared on 448 for 9, a lead of 203, with less than four hours of the day's play remaining. England made slow progress for the remainder of the day, making it to 67 for one after 31 overs, with opener Gooch not out on 38. On day five, Gooch continued to dominate the West Indian bowlers, and partnered first by Gatting and then David Gower, he scored 146 as England ended the day on 301 for three and secured the draw.

Before the Second Test, Gatting was sacked for an alleged off-field indiscretion with a barmaid. The tabloid media made allegations of "shenanigans" in his room; he "admitted taking ... [her] into his room but denied anything untoward had happened". During the previous winter, Gatting had been involved in an on-field altercation with umpire Shakoor Rana in Pakistan that snowballed into a diplomatic disaster with the third day of the second Test in Faisalabad being abandoned and accusations of cheating. His recently published autobiography Leading From The Front "... was banned in all shops on county grounds. Gatting was good enough to lead Middlesex and England, but spectators couldn't buy his book at Lord's". This proved to be Gatting's last match as captain. He had captained England in 23 Test matches since taking charge against India in 1986, but won only two.

=== Second Test ===
16–21 June
Scorecard

West Indies	v	England
209 (67.5 overs); AL Logie 81 (189); GR Dilley 5/55 (23 overs)		165 (59 overs); DI Gower 46 (61); MD Marshall 6/32 (18 overs)
397 (108 overs); CG Greenidge 103 (192); GR Dilley 4/73 (27 overs)		307 (86.5 overs); AJ Lamb 113 (212); MD Marshall 4/60 (25 overs)

West Indies won by 134 runs
Lord's, London, England
Umpires: KE Palmer (Eng) and DR Shepherd (Eng)
Player of the match: AL Logie (WI)

- 19 June was a rest day

Gatting was replaced as England captain by his Middlesex colleague John Emburey. Writing in The Guardian, Mike Selvey suggested that "the England captaincy at present has all the appeal and life expectancy of a South American dictatorship" and suggested that Emburey's position was "more tenuous than most have been at the time of their appointment". Gatting was also dropped from the team, replaced by Yorkshire's Martyn Moxon. DeFreitas was also replaced, by Small, but the tourists were unchanged.

The West Indies won the toss and opted to bat first. England began the Test with "an inspirational morning session" of fast bowling from Dilley, who took four of the first five wickets to fall to reduce the West Indies to 54/5. At lunch on the first day, Dilley had figures of 4/35, and "he would have taken five had Pringle at first slip caught Logie when he was 10". Logie and Dujon settled in to score 81 and 53 respectively, as the West Indies were eventually all out for 209. In reply, England lost Broad for a duck, and ended the day on 20 for one. Moxon, Gower and Gooch all contributed to getting England up to 112 for two, but from then on, the West Indies seam bowling dominated, with Marshall taking 6/32, and with England all out on 165, helped secure a first-innings lead for the visitors of 44 runs. Greenidge and Haynes then faced 6.3 overs between them before the day's play came to a close.

On day three, the touring batsmen completely dominated England's bowlers, adding a further 334 runs, including a century from Greenidge and fifties from Richards and Logie. The West Indies held a 398-run with five wickets in hand as play closed for the day. During the rest day, it was confirmed that Emburey would remain as England captain for the third Test. The fourth day of the second Test match began with England's bowlers taking the remaining five wickets for 43 runs in 11 overs, with the West Indies all out for 397 which set England a target of 442 to win. Logie ended on 95 not out as he ran out of batting partners with both Ambrose and Walsh out for ducks. Other than Lamb who scored 99 not out, England's top order offered little resistance to the West Indies bowling attack, and they ended the day on 214 for seven. The final day saw good innings from a number of the England tail with Downton scoring 27, Emburey 30, Jarvis 29* and Dilley 28, but the final wicket fell soon after lunch. England were all out for 307 and lost the Test match by 134 runs.

=== Third Test ===
30 June – 5 July
Scorecard

England	v	West Indies
135 (60.2 overs); AJ Lamb 33 (82); CA Walsh 4/46 (18.2 overs)		384/7d (140.1 overs); RA Harper 74 (244); GR Dilley 4/99 (28.1 overs)
93 (42.4 overs); DI Gower 34 (60); MD Marshall 7/22 (15.4 overs)

West Indies won by an innings and 156 runs
Old Trafford, Manchester, England
Umpires: DJ Constant (Eng) and NT Plews (Eng)
Player of the match: MD Marshall (WI)

- 3 July was a rest day

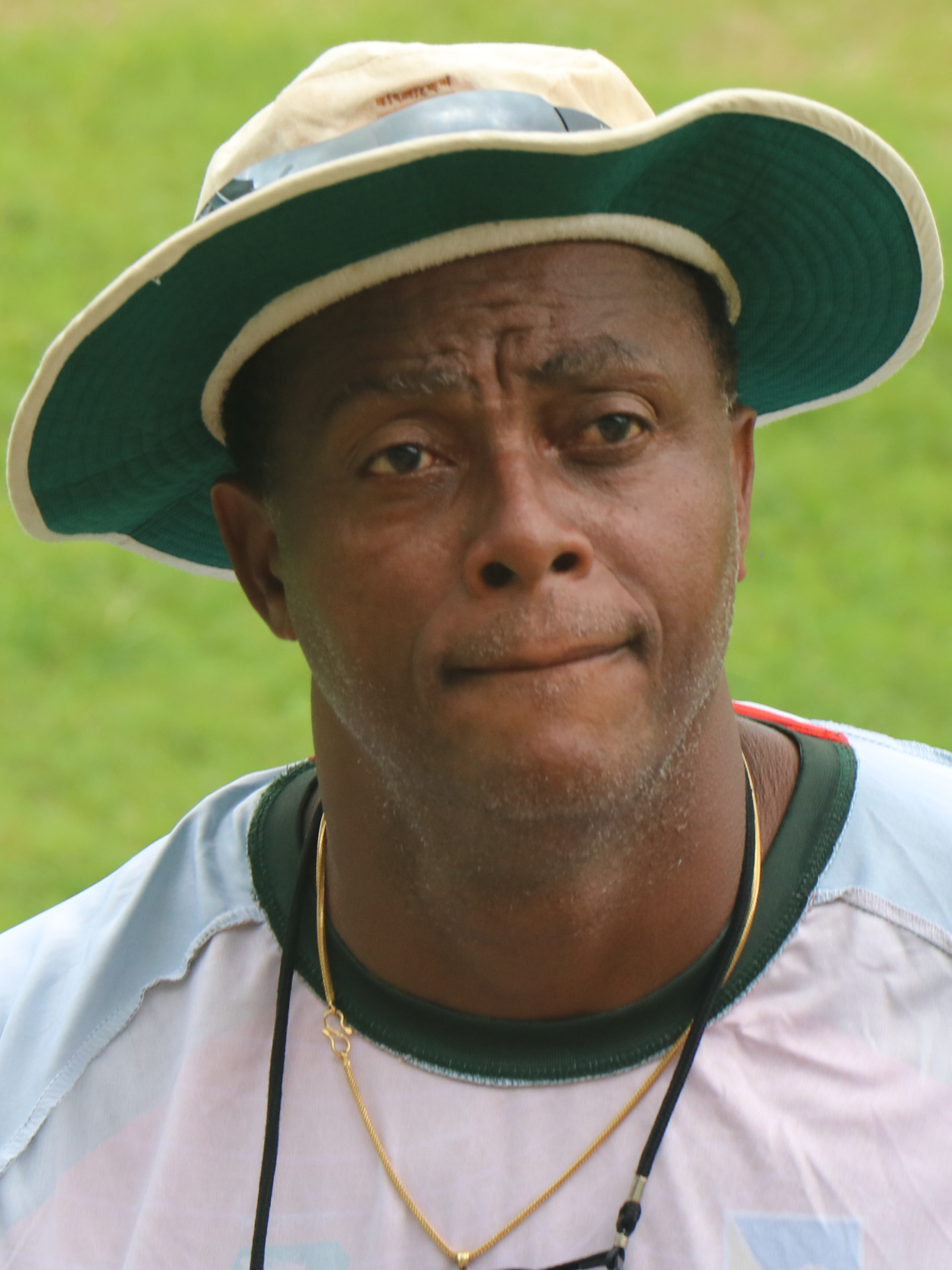
Courtney Walsh (pictured in 2018) took 4 for 46 in the first innings of the Third Test.

The England team had a different look for the third Test, with four changes to the team. The 36-year-old Essex left-arm spinner John Childs made his debut, becoming the oldest England debutant since Dick Howorth in 1947. Childs joined the recalled Gatting and DeFreitas, and newcomer David Capel. Small and Jarvis were both unavailable as a result of injury, and Pringle was dropped. Most media attention however was focused on Broad, who was also dropped, "ostensibly for his consistent failure to make runs in home Tests, but there was always a suspicion that he was being disciplined for the incident at Lord's when he was spotted by a television camera mouthing his disappointment at an lbw decision". For West Indies, Haynes was unfit, ending a run of 72 consecutive caps. He was replaced by the spinner Harper, and Patterson was replaced by Benjamin.

England won the toss and elected to bat, and were quickly two wickets, on 14 for two. Only Gooch, Lamb and Downton offered any real resistance to the West Indian fast bowling attack, as England were bowled out for 135. No batsman scored more than 33 in England's first innings, as the four quick bowlers shared the wickets. Selvey, in The Guardian, was unforgiving in his criticism: "it was pathetic: a capitulation" and that the "debacle was inexcusable". In reply, the West Indies made it to 242 for five by the end of a rain-affected second day, with Greenidge scoring 45 and Richards 47. The third day was once again affected by weather, this time in the form of hailstorms, but the West Indies increased their score to 357 for six, Dujon being the only batsman to fall throughout the day, on 67. That evening, Richards accused the English of deliberating over-watering the Old Trafford pitch so as to reduce the potency of the West Indies attack. After a rest day, the West Indies innings continued into the fourth day, afflicted by poor light. After the loss of Harper for 74, Richards declared on 384 for seven, a lead of 249. In reply, England faced just 29 overs but lost Gooch, Gatting and Moxon cheaply, ending the day's play on 60 for three. On day five, England collapsed, with only Gower make double figures while Capel and DeFreitas were dismissed without scoring. England were all out for 93, Marshall finishing with figures of 15.4–5–22–7, the best of his Test career. Extras were the third highest scorer, with 12. England were "unable to cope for any length of time with the West Indian fast bowlers" and never gave even a sign of competing in a one-sided affair. Two former England captains, Ted Dexter and Bob Willis, called on the chairman of selectors, Peter May, to resign.

On 15 July 1988, ten days after the end of the third Test, it was announced that England's third captain of the series would be Chris Cowdrey, son of Colin Cowdrey, an England captain in the 1960s. May stated: "our performance in the series to date has been disappointing and we believe that Chris's style of leadership is what is now required". Coincidentally, Cowdrey was May's godson, and it was expected that the appointment would last at least until the end of the series. The England selectors surprised the cricket public with their new appointment as captain, selecting a player who many believed owed his appointment more to his father than his own ability. Cowdrey was a successful captain of Kent in county cricket, but had played just five Tests previously, during the 1984–85 tour to India, captained by David Gower. He became only the second son to follow his father as captain of the England cricket team, after George Mann in the 1940s followed Frank Mann in the 1920s.

=== Fourth Test ===
21–26 July
Scorecard

England	v	West Indies
201 (69.1 overs); AJ Lamb 64 (91) (retired hurt); CEL Ambrose 4/58 (25.1 overs)		275 (81.2 overs); RA Harper 56 (112); DR Pringle 5/95 (27 overs)
138 (61.5 overs); GA Gooch 50 (100); CA Walsh 3/38 (20 overs)		67/0 (14.3 overs); PJL Dujon 40* (44)

West Indies won by 10 wickets
Headingley, Leeds, England
Umpires: HD Bird (Eng) and DR Shepherd (Eng)
Player of the match: CEL Ambrose (WI)

- 24 July was a rest day

The England side was thoroughly shaken-up following the debacle in the Third Test at Old Trafford. The selectors tried to turn things around with seven new faces in the team, the most extensive change of an England XI during a Test series since seven players were changed for Tests in the 1921 Ashes Tests. As well as Cowdrey replacing Emburey, Gatting asked not to be considered for selection and the selectors also dropped Downton, Moxon, Capel, Defreitas and Childs in favour of Pringle, Neil Foster, Athey, Jack Richards, Tim Curtis and Robin Smith, with the last two set to make their Test debuts. For the West Indies, both Greenidge and Richardson sat the match out, injured: Haynes returned, and a debut was handed to Keith Arthurton. Jeff Dujon was promoted up the batting order as a makeshift opener.

The match suffered an unusual delay shortly after it began. Play "was halted after two overs ... when the bowler's run-up at the Rugby Club End was found to be flooded ... The drains had been blocked before the Test to try to retain moisture in the square. But the Yorkshire club insisted that all drains were functioning properly by the start of the match and put the cause of the trouble on the volume of overnight rain." Umpires Dickie Bird and David Shepherd became involved in an exchange recalled nearly 30 years later in The Sunday Times:

“It’s wet, Shep!” Dickie shouted across to his co-umpire David Shepherd. “Well throw some sawdust on it Dickie!” Shepherd shouted back. “Sawdust? Nay lad, it’s a lake!” Dickie yelled back, and, on a ground bathed in sunshine, off they all went. “You again Bird!” barked a disgruntled spectator as the players neared the pavilion, to which Dickie famously replied: “Don’t blame me. I’m an umpire, not a plumber.”

The West Indies won the toss and put England in to bat. Considerable rain had fallen overnight and the start of play had to be delayed by nearly an hour because of drizzle. After just two overs, an underground leak erupted at the Rugby Stand end of Headingley, causing play to be suspended until 2:30 p.m. England wickets fell regularly throughout the afternoon, leaving them at 80 for four, but an unbeaten fifth-wicket partnership between Lamb and Smith saw the day's play close with England on 137 for four. After increasing their stand to 103 on day two, Lamb was forced to retire injured, on 64 and England on 183 for four. He went to take a single before hobbling and collapsing at the bowler's end with a torn calf muscle. Smith was then caught behind and Cowdrey was out lbw without scoring. The lower order failed to provide any real resistance to the West Indian bowlers, and England were bowled out for 201. Dujon was the first to fall, followed by Hooper and Richards, while Haynes made a half-century before being trapped lbw by Pringle with the West Indies on 137 for four. Logie was then caught by Foster off a slower ball from Pringle, before rain curtailed the day's play with the West Indies on 156 for five, 45 runs behind England.

Rain delayed the start of the third day, with play not possible until 2:45 p.m. and in the two hours of play before the inclement weather returned, the West Indies were on 238 for eight with Harper on 31. He completed his half-century on day four before being the last wicket to fall, the West Indies being 275 all out with a lead of 74. Gooch and Curtis put on an opening stand of 56 before the latter was bowled by Ambrose. After making his half-century, Gooch was caught by Hooper off the bowling of Walsh with England 80 for two. England then collapsed, losing their remaining wickets for 58 more runs, including 19 from Lamb who played despite carrying his injury. All out on a total of 138, England held a lead of 47 going into the final day. Just 26 minutes into day five, the West Indies made their target without loss, winning the match by ten wickets and taking an unassailable 3–0 lead in the series into the fifth and final Test. Cowdrey suggested the defeat was in part directly as a result of the loss of Lamb mid-partnership with Smith: "you need partnerships to put pressure on [the West Indian bowlers], for as soon as you lose a wicket, they raise their game".

=== Fifth Test ===
4–8 August
Scorecard

England	v	West Indies
205 (90.3 overs); RA Smith 57 (162); CEL Ambrose 3/31 (20 overs)		183 (59 overs); PJL Dujon 64 (111); NA Foster 5/64 (16 overs)
202 (89.1 overs); GA Gooch 84 (240); WKM Benjamin 4/52 (22 overs)		226/2 (91 overs); DL Haynes 77* (237); NA Foster 1/52 (18 overs)

West Indies won by 8 wickets
The Oval, London, England
Umpires: HD Bird (Eng) and KE Palmer (Eng)
Player of the match: PJL Dujon (WI)

- 7 August was a rest day

The England selectors turned to 35-year-old Graham Gooch, stalwart opening batsman, as their fourth captain of the series, for the Fifth Test at The Oval. England also replaced Cowdrey with DeFreitas, dropped Gower for Matthew Maynard, and replaced the injured Allan Lamb with Rob Bailey, a recall and two Test debuts respectively. The tourists replaced the youngster Arthurton with Greenidge, who had recovered from an injury.

England won the toss and elected to bat, with Gooch receiving the first ball, but the new captain was the first wicket to fall with the score on only 12. Some solid top-order play from Curtis (30), Bailey (43) and Smith (57) was followed by some mediocre scores from the middle- and lower-order batsmen. The West Indian off spinner Harper took three wickets, being the first England wickets to fall to spin during the summer. England then collapsed again and lost six wickets for 83 runs to end the day on 203 for nine. Just two more runs were added on the second day as Marshall had Foster caught off the third ball of the day, his 34th wicket of the series. After nine overs, the West Indies had collapsed to 16 for three with Foster taking the wickets of Haynes, Greenidge and Richards. Logie and Dujon then steadied the innings, taking the score to 155 for five but the tail-enders offered little resistance. Losing their last five wickets for 28 runs, the West Indies were all out for 183. England started their second innings with a lead of 22, with Gooch and Curtis making a 50-run opening partnership before the latter was out lbw. Bailey and Smith both fell with the score on 55, and play ended for the day with Gooch unbeaten on 38 and England on 64 for three, 86 ahead of the West Indies. Foster, the nightwatchman, and Gooch completed a 50-run partnership on the morning of day three before the former was caught by Logie off Benjamin's bowling. Gooch remained at the crease for almost the whole innings, described by Scyld Berry writing in The Observer as "one of the most famous by an England captain in recent years". His was the last wicket to fall, caught by Greenidge off Ambrose, for a seven-hour 84, and England were all out for 202, a lead of 224. In reply, the West Indies made an unbeaten start, with Greenidge making a half-century and his side ended the day on 71 without loss, requiring 154 runs for victory. Gooch's Test match ended with a trip to hospital to address a dislocated finger sustained while he fielded at slip. After a rest day, the West Indies resumed their run chase and a first-wicket partnership of 131 came to an end when Greenidge was out for 77, caught behind off Childs' bowling. Hooper made 23 before being bowled by Foster but Logie (38*) and the opener Haynes (77*) secured the victory by eight wickets with more than a day of the Test match to spare, and ensured a 4–0 series victory for the West Indies.

== Aftermath ==
Gooch had enjoyed a successful series against West Indies as a batsman, named 'Man of the series' for England. He remained in charge for England's next match, against Sri Lanka at Lord's later in the 1988 season, in which he achieved his first victory as captain. Gooch was appointed captain for the 1988–89 tour of India, which was cancelled after India refused visas to eight players who had played in South Africa, and he was replaced as captain in summer 1989 by a new England management team, who reappointed David Gower for the six-match Ashes series at home against Australia. England lost 4–0, bringing Gower's long captaincy career to a close. When a "rebel" England tour of South Africa (breaking the sporting boycott of South Africa) was announced, a number of candidates for captain were removed from the picture, as those who joined the tour, captained by Gatting, were banned from regular international cricket.

Gooch was reappointed England captain for the tour to West Indies in the winter of 1989–90 and remained in that position until 1993. Personally, he achieved great success: for much of this period, he was also rated as one of the world's leading batsmen.

England's fortunes under Gooch revived. With so many potential players banned from the side, England took a new-look team to West Indies in 1989–90, and won the first Test, their first victory over the West Indies in Test cricket since 1974. Gooch's hand was broken by fast bowler Ezra Moseley and he missed the rest of the series. Understudy Allan Lamb lost both of his matches in charge and England lost the series, but had performed creditably: Wisden reported "The truth of the matter is that at worst they merited a shared series, and at best an unimaginable upset of the world champions of Test Cricket." The 1991 home series, yet again versus West Indies, was a hard-fought 2–2 draw, and, in one-day cricket, England reached the World Cup final for the second successive time the following winter, losing to Pakistan. Away from home, though, England were not so strong, losing heavily to Australia in 1990–91 and to India and Sri Lanka in 1992–93, though these were either side of a series victory in New Zealand.

The West Indies team's next opposition was Australia where the team enjoyed a 3–1 Test series win on foreign soil, their only defeat in that series coming on a pitch friendly to spin bowling in which 11 wickets were taken by the occasional left-arm spin of Allan Border. "The West Indians made a slow start to their tour, losing twice to Western Australia before running into form ... So effectively, at times irresistibly, did Vivian Richards's West Indian side play in the first three Test matches in Australia that by the New Year they had already retained the Frank Worrell Trophy."

The West Indies went on to record further Test series victories in the next two years, defeating India 3–0 in a four-Test series in the Caribbean in 1988–89, and narrowly beating England once again in the Caribbean in 1989–90. However, the team's long period of pre-eminence was coming to an end. For several of their senior players, the 1991 tour of England was a swansong: Richards, Marshall and Dujon all retired from Tests after the final match, while Greenidge, after 108 Tests, had announced his intention to do likewise but was forced out of the tour by injury before the Tests began, and Logie also played his last of his 52 Tests on the tour. Nevertheless, the West Indies were to remain unbeaten in a Test series for a few more years yet, but never as dominant as they had been: and their 2–1 home defeat by Australia in 1994–95 saw the West Indies relinquish the mantle as the World's best Test cricket side to their visitors, and by the time that the International Cricket Council launched the official Test rankings in 2001, the West Indies were rated as the sixth best team in the world.

In one way, the 1988 series was a watershed. The 4–0 win in 1988 was the fifth series win in succession for West Indies on English soil, a run stretching back to 1973, and part of a longer series of seven wins out of eight stretching back to 1963. Since then, West Indies have failed to win another series in England, with defeats in 2000, 2004, 2007, 2009, 2012, 2017 and 2020, and drawn series in 1991 and 1995. On home turf, West Indies continued their domination until the new millennium, since when West Indies have won twice, England once and there has been one drawn series.
