= 1989 Ashes series =

International cricket tour

1989 Ashes Series
- Part of the 1989 Australian tour of England
- Date: 8 June – 29 August 1989
- Location: England
- Result: Australia won the 6-Test series 4–0
- Player of the series: Terry Alderman
Teams
- England: Australia
Captains
- David Gower: Allan Border
Most runs
- 553 Robin Smith 383 David Gower: 839 Mark Taylor; 506 Steve Waugh
Most wickets
- 12 Neil Foster 9 Angus Fraser: 41 Terry Alderman; 29 Geoff Lawson

The 1989 Ashes series was a series of Test cricket matches contested between England and Australia for the Ashes. It formed part of the 1989 Australian tour of England. The six-Test series began on 8 June 1989 at Headingley in Leeds and ended on 29 August 1989 at The Oval in London.

Australia won the series 4–0 to win the Ashes for the first time since 1982–83, and the first time in England since 1975. Australia would go on to retain the Ashes until 2005, winning four series at home and a further three in England during this period.

The one-sidedness of the series was highlighted by Australia only using 12 players for the whole series, compared with England using 29 players.

== Squads ==
England

Manager: Micky Stewart

Player	Date of birth	Batting	Bowling style	First class team
David Gower (c)	1 April 1957	Left	Right arm off spin	Hampshire
Mike Atherton	23 March 1968	Right	Right arm leg spin	Lancashire
Kim Barnett	17 July 1960	Right	Right arm leg spin	Derbyshire
Ian Botham	24 November 1955	Right	Right arm fast medium	Worcestershire
Chris Broad	29 September 1957	Left	Right arm fast medium	Gloucestershire
David Capel	6 February 1963	Right	Right arm medium fast	Northamptonshire
Nick Cook	17 June 1956	Right	Left arm orthodox	Leicestershire
Tim Curtis	15 January 1960	Right	Right arm leg spin	Worcestershire
Phillip DeFreitas	18 February 1966	Right	Right arm fast medium	Derbyshire
Graham Dilley	18 May 1959	Left	Right arm fast	Worcestershire
John Emburey	20 August 1952	Right	Right arm off spin	Middlesex
Neil Foster	6 May 1962	Right	Right arm fast medium	Essex
Angus Fraser	8 August 1965	Right	Right arm fast medium	Middlesex
Mike Gatting	6 June 1957	Right	Right arm medium	Middlesex
Graham Gooch	23 July 1953	Right	Right arm medium	Essex
Eddie Hemmings	20 February 1949	Right	Right arm off spin	Nottinghamshire
Alan Igglesden	8 October 1964	Right	Right arm medium fast	Kent
Paul Jarvis	29 June 1965	Right	Right arm fast medium	Yorkshire
Allan Lamb	20 June 1954	Right	Right arm medium	Northamptonshire
Devon Malcolm	22 February 1963	Right	Right arm fast	Derbyshire
Martyn Moxon	4 May 1960	Right	Right arm medium	Yorkshire
Phil Newport	11 October 1962	Right	Right arm fast medium	Worcestershire
Derek Pringle	18 September 1958	Right	Right arm medium	Essex
Tim Robinson	21 November 1958	Right	Right arm medium	Nottinghamshire
Jack Russell	15 August 1963	Left	Wicket-keeper	Gloucestershire
Gladstone Small	18 October 1961	Right	Right arm fast medium	Warwickshire
Robin Smith	13 September 1963	Right	Right arm leg spin	Hampshire
John Stephenson	14 March 1965	Right	Right arm fast medium	Essex
Chris Tavaré	27 October 1954	Right	Right arm off spin	Kent

Australia

Coach: Bob Simpson

Player	Date of birth	Batting	Bowling style	First class team
Allan Border (c)	27 July 1955	Left	Left arm orthodox	Queensland
Geoff Marsh (vc)	31 December 1958	Right	Right arm medium	Western Australia
Terry Alderman	12 June 1956	Right	Right arm fast medium / swing	Western Australia
David Boon	29 December 1960	Right	Right arm off spin	Tasmania
Greg Campbell	10 March 1964	Right	Right arm fast medium	Tasmania
Ian Healy	30 April 1964	Right	Wicket-keeper	Queensland
Trevor Hohns	23 January 1954	Left	Right arm leg spin	Queensland
Merv Hughes	23 November 1961	Right	Right arm fast	Victoria
Dean Jones	24 March 1961	Right	Right arm off spin	Victoria
Geoff Lawson	7 December 1957	Right	Right arm fast	New South Wales
Mark Taylor	27 October 1964	Left	Right arm medium	New South Wales
Steve Waugh	2 June 1965	Right	Right arm medium	New South Wales

== Match details ==
=== First Test ===
8–13 June
Scorecard

Australia	v	England
601/7d (178.3 overs); Steve Waugh 177* (242); Neil Foster 3/109 (46 overs)		430 (121.5 overs); Allan Lamb 125 (204); Terry Alderman 5/107 (37 overs)
230/3d (54.5 overs); Allan Border 60* (76); Derek Pringle 1/60 (12.5 overs)		191 (55.2 overs); Graham Gooch 68 (118); Terry Alderman 5/44 (20 overs)

Australia won by 210 runs
Headingley, Leeds
Umpires: John Holder (Eng) and David Shepherd (Eng)
Player of the match: Terry Alderman (Australia)

- England won the toss and elected to field.
- Greg Campbell made his Test debut for Australia.

Australia went into the First Test at Headingley as major underdogs having lost the previous two Ashes series both home and away, and also drawing the three match Texaco Trophy One Day International series to England. The English press had branded the tourists as 'possibly one of the worst sides to ever tour England'.

The Australian side was led by Allan Border.

The match was evenly poised on the first morning of day one, but then brilliant batting by a young Mark Taylor and a coming of age by Steve Waugh who both scored centuries, took the Australians over 600 who confidently declared, and set the tone for the rest of the series. Australia were not dismissed for less than 400 all series.

The first Test was also marked by the re-emergence of Terry Alderman. After his brilliant 1981 Ashes series in which he took 42 wickets, he suffered serious injury, and a temporary ban for touring South Africa, but came back re-invented as a swing bowler for the 1989 Ashes and took 10 wickets in the first Test to lead Australia to a 210 run victory.

Day One

England won the toss and confidently sent the tourists in to bat on what looked a lively pitch, in fact as the day wore on, batting became easier and easier. Australia retained their new opening partnership of Geoff Marsh and Mark Taylor who was playing in just his third Test and had so far failed to cement his place in the order. The first session saw the pair nervously trying to see off the new ball, and England's decision to bowl looked a good one when the opening stand was broken for 44, Marsh out for 16. The second wicket only added 13, with Australian stalwart David Boon caught behind for 9 and Australia teetering.

The Australian captain Allan Border came to the crease and slowly at first, but then with gathering momentum, he went about restoring the Australian innings alongside Mark Taylor, who appeared to be growing in confidence as the day went on. By the third session they had added 120 before Border mis-timed and was caught out for a determined 66. Australia had reached a healthy 174 for 3. Dean Jones joined Mark Taylor and the pair added a further 33 to see Australia at 207 for 3 at stumps on day one, with Taylor having batted the whole day not out on 96.

Day Two

Jones and Taylor resumed on the second morning with everybody watching to see if the young New South Wales batsman Taylor, could add the four runs he needed for his maiden Test century and he did not disappoint, bringing up his ton shortly after the resumption. It was not the most glamorous of centuries, but filled the young batsman with the confidence he needed to secure his place in the team for much of the next decade. Jones and Taylor batted throughout the morning taking Australia to 273 for 4 when Taylor was finally dismissed for 136.

Whilst the Englishmen may have been delighted to see the back of centurion Taylor, they would later regret the arrival of his replacement Steve Waugh, who throughout the remainder of the second day played an astonishing array of strokes all around the wicket, exemplified by his signature square cut, and simply tore the English bowling to pieces.

First with Dean Jones, eventually dismissed for 79, and with Merv Hughes after Ian Healy was dismissed for 16, Waugh battered the English bowling to be 174 not out and have Australia 580 for 6 at stumps on day two. The bowler Hughes also seemed filled with confidence from Waugh's display and remained with him on 63 not out. The partnership of Waugh and Hughes reached 147, a record for the 7th wicket in England.

Where Taylor's century had been workman-like, Waugh's was one of flair, hitting the boundary 24 times, and it saw the coming of age of a batman who had struggled in previous series, having not scored a century in the first four years of his Test career.

Day Three

England began the third day facing the gloomy prospect of a rampant Australia and gloomy skies as well. They had the consolation of dismissing the stubborn Hughes, but Australia soon passed 600 and captain Allan Border declared immediately at 601 for 7, with Steve Waugh undismissed on 177*.

Although the score they were chasing seemed daunting, England set about their innings in a sensible fashion, and although they lost Graham Gooch and Chris Broad before lunch, Allan Lamb and Kim Barnett set about building a solid partnership of 184, before Barnett was adjudged LBW for 80, replays suggested that the ball from Terry Alderman might have missed leg stump.

This method of dismissal was Alderman's trademark during the 1989 Ashes. He had the ability to obtain just enough swing such that balls which looked as if they would miss leg stump would swing back late and trap batsmen as they played the ball to leg. Given Alderman bowled so close to the stumps, umpires were inclined to give decisions in Alderman's favour. This was clearly before the days of the "hawkeye" predictive path – though several decisions given in Alderman's favour throughout the series (of which Barnett's was one) would probably not have been given out at the time of writing (December 2009).

As they skies turned heavier, Alderman seemed to extract more and more swing and beat the bat throughout the afternoon. England were having difficulty playing him, but kept the scoreboard ticking over nonetheless. Geoff Lawson had English captain David Gower caught behind for 26 in the final session bringing South African born Robin Smith to the crease. Lamb reached his century just before stumps on day three and remained 103 not out over night, England having reached a healthy 284 for 4 in reply.

Day Four

England resumed on the fourth day looking to get as close as possible to Australia's score in the hope of bowling them out cheaply in the second innings, and set up an easy chase. Lamb moved on from his overnight 103 in much the same fashion as he had done the previous day. Smith joined in and the pair looked quite comfortable throughout the morning. Lamb was batting confidently and the pair took their partnership past 50. A short time later however, Lamb was undone by a brilliant trade-mark bat-pad catch by David Boon off Alderman's bowling. A short time later Derek Pringle, out LBW, became debutant Greg Campbell's first ever Test wicket, and his only victim of the whole tour.

England who had been progressing nicely were teetering and 338 for 6. Smith and Phil Newport briefly stabilised the innings, before Smith was undone by yet another straight ball from Terry Alderman, trapping him LBW for 66. Gooch and Barnett had been dismissed with identical deliveries. Newport was joined by Jack Russell and the pair took England past 400, but the Australian bowlers had their tails up. Newport went for a well made 36, caught hooking by Boon off Lawson, and Phillip DeFreitas lasted just 6 balls before being undone by the fourth straight one Terry Alderman, also out LBW. Russell and Neil Foster added a further 6 runs before was caught by Geoff Marsh off Lawson leaving England all out for 430, 171 runs in arrears. Terry Alderman was the pick of the Australian bowlers with 5 for 107 for the innings.

England felt they probably still had a chance of victory if they could pick up quick wickets, and set up a low final day run chase, but would otherwise be looking for the draw. Things began brightly for England when Geoff Marsh was caught behind for only 6 off Neil Foster's bowling. But from then on David Boon and Mark Taylor looked determined to put the game out of England's reach, until Taylor was out for a well made 60 leaving Australia at 97 for 2. Captain Allan Border came in and looked determined to lead from the front, scoring at a fast rate, and when Boon was out for 43, Dean Jones emerged from the dressing room looking even more determined. The pair moved along at a rapid rate, taking Australia to 158 for 3 at stumps.

Day Five

England began day five looking as though they were looking to drag the day out for a draw, but Jones and Border had other ideas. Resuming their free-scoring from the previous evening, the pair moved rapidly onwards, Jones scoring at better than a run-a-ball for a well made 40 not out off 34 balls. Although not quite as rapid, Border's 60 not out off 76 was still quite pacey, and the captain clearly had a plan in mind when he soon declared the Australian innings closed at 230 for 3, leaving England an unlikely 401 for victory off two sessions.

That particular session will be remembered for some of the worst bowling ever witnessed by England fans. The attack was blatantly tired (from 2+ days in the field) but displayed their lack of fitness by still being tired even after 2 days off (rest days on Sundays were still the case in 1989). The Australian batsmen scored at over a run a ball that morning as Gower was left with 3 bowlers. In his autobiography, Gower remarked how bad a game Newport had had such that he was allowed only 5 overs (which cost 22 runs) in the second innings. It should also be remembered that the chance of victory for Australia was slim at best – declaring only around an hour before lunch to take ten wickets. The England bowlers were therefore demotivated by the feeling of going through the motions during that hour and the result was the fast scoring which firmly ensured there could be only one winner.

Although the draw was looking likely, the Australian bowlers sensed victory. Alderman soon had Chris Broad out LBW to a full ball which bounced only about 6 inches. A wild stroke saw Barnett caught at slip for 34, and Lamb, the centurion of the first innings out for 4, England looked to be in trouble at 77 for 3. David Gower offered brief resistance with a well made 34 before he was caught behind off Geoff Lawson, leaving England at 134 for 4, and then the tail crumbled completely. Robin Smith (0 off 3 balls), then opener Graham Gooch (68 off 118) who had looked reasonably comfortable, were soon followed by Derek Pringle (0 off 27 balls), Jack Russell (2 off 22 balls), Phil Newport (8 off 27 balls), and finally Phillip DeFreitas (21 off 18 balls). England had lost 6 wickets for 57 runs to be all out for 191. Terry Alderman claimed 5 for 44 in the second innings, giving him match figures of 10 for 151, his best Test career figures, and making him man of the match.

Australia had won the first Test by 210 runs, and led the 1989 Ashes series 1–0. The English press duly lambasted the side for their poor performance, especially David Gower who had inserted Australia and watched them amass 600 runs. The media called for instant changes demanding the head of Derek Pringle in particular.

=== Second Test ===
22–27 June
Scorecard

England	v	Australia
286 (86.5 overs); Graham Gooch 60 (123); Merv Hughes 4/71 (23 overs)		528 (158 overs); Steve Waugh 152* (249); John Emburey 4/88 (42 overs)
359 (130 overs); David Gower 106 (198); Terry Alderman 6/128 (38 overs)		119/4 (40.2 overs); David Boon 58 (121); Neil Foster 3/39 (18 overs)

Australia won by 6 wickets
Lord's Cricket Ground, London
Umpires: Dickie Bird (Eng) and Nigel Plews (Eng)
Player of the match: Steve Waugh (Australia)

- England won the toss and elected to bat.

The only change to the team that the Australians made for the entire series came when the disappointing Greg Campbell, with only one wicket in the first test, was dropped for Trevor Hohns for the second test. The Australians would retain the same line up for the rest of the series.

If the English team had learned any lessons from the First Test, it was that they, and the English press had vastly underestimated the abilities of Allan Border's well-picked young batting line-up who had scored over 800 runs between them at Headingley. So when David Gower won the toss again at Lord's he wasn't going to repeat his mistake of sending Australia in again. The irony this time being that cloudy skies prevailed and bowling would have been the better option. He chose to bat, but Hughes and Alderman had England three wickets down by lunch, including Gatting first ball to another bat pad catch (he had been out in a similar fashion during the Old Trafford Texaco game). Gooch made 60 and Gower 57 as the England batsmen seemed intent on attack. While this was reflected in a score of 280 well before the close of play, they lost all 10 wickets in getting there.

As was so often the case during 1989, when the Australians batted, the clouds disappeared and the pitches were largely good. They again piled on runs, quickly passing the English score by the middle of day three, with Steve Waugh's brilliant 152 not out leading them eventually to 528, despite excellent bowling by John Emburey, who claimed 4 for 88. An astonishing supporting cameo of 74 off 94 balls from the Australian number 10 Geoff Lawson enabled Waugh's heroics, and helped see the Australians over 500, and also remained Lawson's best ever test innings.

A first innings lead of 242 placed great pressure on the English batsmen, but their combined experience counted when it was required, and their captain David Gower led the fight-back with a well made 106. Robin Smith was unluckily dismissed for 96. However it was again Terry Alderman's turn with 6 for 128, 4 of them LBWs achieved through either dead straight balls or – his speciality – the late swing from leg stump making them virtually straight balls that the batsmen played across. England had made a solid 359, but their first innings had let them down, and it left Australia with a comfortable target of 118 runs for victory on the last day.

Day One

England won the toss and chose to bat on what looked a good Lord's batting pitch. Alderman began from the pavilion end and was bowling into the breeze, helping him to swing the ball. Graham Gooch and Chris Broad initially looked comfortable, but the ball began to move more as it wore on. Alderman finally struck, rapping Broad on the pads directly in front to have him LBW for 18. Kim Barnett was on the receiving end of some intimidating bowling from Merv Hughes, and the tactic paid off when Boon caught him at bat pad trying to fend a short ball away. Mike Gatting made a disappointing golden duck, dismissed in exactly the same fashion.

David Gower (57 off 62 balls), Graham Gooch (60 off 123 balls), Robin Smith (32 off 36 balls), and Jack Russell (64 not out off 115 balls) provided some middle-order resistance, but it was not enough, as the tail once again folded, leaving England all out for 286. Merv Hughes had claimed 4 for 71, and Terry Alderman took 3 for 60.

Australia had to face an awkward four overs before stumps, but openers Marsh and Taylor remained not out at the close, Australia 4 for no loss.

Day Two

The Australians began day two looking to go past England's total, and build a big lead, and that is exactly what they did. Geoff Marsh fell off just 14 balls for a disappointing 3, but Mark Taylor and David Boon added 145 for the second wicket, although it was hard work and slow-going. Taylor was caught LBW for 62 in a rare lapse of concentration in an otherwise well made innings, and Boon was dismissed 42 runs later, out for 94. Australia batted on throughout the second day but their progress was slow but steady.

Allan Border added 35, and Dean Jones made 27, but the highlight of the second day came in the form of Steve Waugh who continued his imperious form from the first test, driving square of the wicket masterfully. Although he was not as quick scoring in the first test, he moved onto 35 not out by the close, with Merv Hughes once again by his side not out on 2. Australia had ground out runs throughout a slow second day to end on 276 for 6, still ten runs behind England's first innings score.

Day Three

When day three began, England may have harboured hopes of picking up the last four Australian wickets quickly, and setting about building a solid lead, however Steve Waugh wanted to press on. He was seeing the ball well, and moving into some of the best form of his career so far, and made the most of it. Well supported by Hughes, who made a solid 30, Waugh began to free his arms, and lifted the Australian's run-rate.

Hughes dismissal in the morning session left Australia 331 for 7, and England should have knocked over the last few wickets, but their inability to clean up the Australian tail cost them dearly. First Trevor Hohns with 21 off 38 balls, and then fast bowler Geoff Lawson with a career best of 74 off 94 balls provided the lower tail support Steve Waugh needed to go on with his innings. As the impetus of Waugh's innings grew, Lawson contented himself with spectating from the bowler's end, and playing defensively when he had to, although the 11 fours he struck during his innings testified to his ability to pick off the bad balls that were bowled to him. Lawson eventually fell to Emburey's off-spin for 74, but the damage had been done as he had supported Waugh to guide the Australian's past 500. With the fall of Terry Alderman's wicket, Australia ware all out for 528, a first innings lead of 242, with Steve Waugh once again not out on 152.

Not content with creating a large first innings lead, the Australian's were determined to make the most of the remaining overs of the day, and set about the English top order. Two minutes into the English innings, Terry Alderman again bamboozled Graham Gooch with the inswinging yorker, trapping him LBW for a third ball duck. Kim Barnett followed a few overs later for 3, caught off the bowling of Alderman, and Chris Broad was clean bowled by Geoff Lawson for 20. At stumps on day 3, England were in trouble at 58 for 3, Gower and Gatting the not out batsmen.

Day Four

England emerged on the morning of the fourth day determined to fight back, and were led from the front by captain Gower. Gatting went during the morning session for 22, but then Gower and new partner Robin Smith put on 139 for the fifth wicket to rescue England's innings. Gower was out for 106 shortly after bringing up his ton, caught by Border off Hughes.

Jack Russell again provided stubborn resistance with 29, he and Smith guiding England into the lead, before Smith fell agonisingly close to his century on 96. John Emburey briefly led a wagging of the tail, and was not out on 21 with Graham Dilley on 4, with England 322 for 9 at the close of day 4.

Day Five

Australia began the fifth day looking to knock over England's last wicket quickly, and set a modest chase, but Dilley and Emburey were determined to drag it out as long as possible. They remained for close to two hours, add 37 to England's overnight score, but finally succumbed when Hughes bowled a short pitched delivery to Dilley, who could only fend the ball into the waiting hands of David Boon. He was out for 24, and Emburey had made an excellent 36 not out, England finishing on 359 all out. Whilst it was England's best score of the series so far, it still only left Australia with a target of 117 to win.

Terry Alderman was once again the pick of Australia's bowlers with 6 for 128, his career best innings figures and taking his tally for series so far to 19 in the first two tests, a remarkable 9 of which were LBW dismissals.

Australia were in no mood to mess around with their run chase and began aggressively, but it back-fired when Geoff Marsh was out clean bowled by Dilley for 1. Boon and Taylor then put on 42 for the second wicket, before Taylor was out for 27. Australia then wobbled, Allan Border out for 1, and Dean Jones out for a fourth ball duck, before ever reliable Steve Waugh joined David Boon, and the pair added the remaining 50 runs required for victory, the winning runs brought up by David Boon, who memorably swept Paul Jarvis to the square leg boundary for four to win. Boon ended on 58 not out, and Waugh, 21 not out, was yet to be dismissed in the series. Steve Waugh was named man of the match for his first innings 152*, which set up the victory when the game was evenly poised.

Australia had won the second test by 6 wickets, and led the 1989 Ashes series 2–0.

=== Third Test ===
6–11 July
Scorecard

Australia	v	England
424 (142 overs); Dean Jones 157 (294); Angus Fraser 4/63 (33 overs)		242 (96.3 overs); Ian Botham 46 (110); Terry Alderman 3/61 (26.3 overs)
158/2 (65 overs); Mark Taylor 51 (148); Paul Jarvis 1/20 6 overs)

Match drawn
Edgbaston, Birmingham
Umpires: Dickie Bird (Eng) and John Holder (Eng)
Player of the match: Dean Jones (Australia)

- Australia won the toss and elected to bat.
- Angus Fraser made his Test debut for England.

Gloomy weather threatened the third test before it even began, and rain and bad light eventually cost over ten hours of lost play during the match. The return of Ian Botham lifted the hosts spirits who went into the match trailing 2–0 in the six test series, however in his first match back after over a year off following serious spinal surgery, the English champion was well below his best. A bigger surprise was the return of Chris Tavaré who had not appeared for England in over five years, and his selection appeared to some to be a sign of increasing desperation on the part of the English selectors.

Dean Jones inspired Australia to another big first innings score of 424 with a superb 157, and England only narrowly avoided the follow-on creeping to 242 with a rusty Ian Botham top scoring with 46. The highlight of the match for England was the first ever test wicket for debutant Angus Fraser who finally captured the wicket of Steve Waugh (undismissed in the first two tests) giving him a series average of 393.00. The rain ruined Australia's party and a dour Edgbaston test ended in an inevitable draw.

Day One

The Australians won the toss and full of confidence from the 1400 plus runs already compiled in the first two tests, decided to bat again. The pitch was not ideal, and rain threatened throughout, but a solid start from Taylor and Marsh took the tourists to 88 for the first wicket and threatened more of the same. Marsh (42) and Taylor (43) both made solid starts and kept the score ticking over, but it was Allan Border's dismissal for 8 that actually changed Australia's innings for the better. Dean Jones came to the wicket with the Australians at 105 for 3, and looked determined for a well overdue big score. His last century had been a magnificent 216 against the West Indies the previous summer, and he had looked frustrated so far in the current series.

Jones set about his innings in a workman-like fashion and kept the scoreboard ticking over. He and Boon put on 96 for the fourth wicket, before the different pace at running between the wickets of the burly Tasmanian and greyhound-like Jones led to Boon's run out for 38. This brought Steve Waugh to the wicket for the Australians, who so far had not been dismissed all series. Jones had edged past fifty and was looking very confident as the day wore on. The pair added a further 31, and despite day one ending with an almost biblical-scale lightning storm and flash flood, Australia ended day one on 234 for 4, with Dean Jones 71 not out, and Steve Waugh 17 not out.

Day Two

If rain had affected day one, it ruined day two with the ground virtually awash as play was due to begin. Although some overs were bowled the day was almost a total loss and complete wash-out. The players did emerge briefly, and in a rare glimmer of brightness for the England team, a young Angus Fraser on debut, had Steve Waugh finally dismissed for the first time in the series, bowled for 43. Ian Healy went the same way to the same bowler for a disappoint 2 a few overs later, and Dean Jones brought up his century.

After a disappointing day's play, the Australians had added a mere 62 for the loss of two wickets, ending the day on 294 for 6, Dean Jones still not out on 101 and Merv Hughes not out on 1.

Day Three

The third day was once again interrupted by rain, however Australia managed to continue pushing the game beyond England's reach, although the longer they batted the more likely a draw became. Dean Jones resumed not out on 101 and, although the Australians lost Merv Hughes cheaply, Jones and Trevor Hohns (40) put on 92 for the seventh wicket. Once again though the only winner on day three was the weather with much of the day lost to the rain.

Day Four

Dean Jones resumed day four on 141 not out and took Australia past 400 with the help of Hohns, and then Geoff Lawson, however Jones himself was out for 157 soon after lawson's departure, and after an epic 4-day innings, Australia were finally all out for 424 with a match result looking very unlikely. Captain Allan Border may have fancied his chances of dismissing England cheaply twice, but the remaining time made the prospect seem unlikely. His hope would have been to bowl them out for a low total, enforce the follow-on and then either defeat them by the innings or set a low target score for victory.

The Australian pace trio of Alderman, Lawson and Hughes looked set for the task and got the early break-throughs they required, Gooch trapped LBW by Lawson for 8, Gower, LBW by Alderman for 8, and Tavaré caught at first slip by Mark Taylor off Alderman for 2 to leave England once again tittering at 47 for 3. Curtis who had reached 41 was next to go with the score on 75, and Barnett, out for 10, went soon after with the total unchanged. England were looking on the brink of an embarrassing first innings at 75 for 5 when veteran all-rounder Ian Botham, still not back to his best, came to the wicket. Although there was not much chance of him repeating his match-winning heroics of the 1981 Ashes series, Botham was determined to help England avoid defeat. He and wicket-keeper Jack Russell put on 96 for the sixth wicket to stabilise England's innings. Botham was finally bowled by Merv Hughes for 46, and Jack Russell went soon after for 42, leaving England at 171 for 7, but Australia's hopes of an unlikely victory were fading. At the end of day four England finished 185 for 7, with John Emburey (2) and Angus Fraser (12) at the crease.

Day Five

Allan Border would have still held out a faint hope of victory on the morning of day five, but it seemed unlikely. Fraser failed to add to his overnight score and was run out for 12 soon after the resumption. Emburey and Graham Dilley added 30 for the ninth wicket, much to the frustration of the Australians before Emburey fell for a well made 26 to a sharp chance taken by David Boon off Lawson. If the ninth wicket stand of 30 had frustrated the Australian bowlers the 10th wicket partnership of 27 between Dilley and Paul Jarvis was just annoying, and made an Australian victory all but impossible. Alderman finally trapped Jarivs LBW with what was fast becoming his trademark of the series, the inswinging yorker, but England had struggled to 242, which although a disappointing score, had dragged out their innings long enough to avoid the follow-on and not leave the Australians with enough time for victory.

The Australians began their second innings with the prospect of facing 65 overs, but without any real hope of victory, and seemed set to use the batting practice as part of the psychological battle. Marsh and Taylor began quite aggressively and quickly took the score past fifty, before Marsh was bowled by Jarvis for 42, the Australians on 81 for 1. Taylor and Boon went past the 100 mark, and Taylor brought up his fifty before, on 51, he mistimed and was caught by Botham off the part-time medium bowling off Graham Gooch. Wicket-Keeper Ian Healy was the surprise replacement, elevated up the order for batting practice, and he and Boon saw out the rest of the day, putting on 49 to leave Australia at 158 for 2 at stumps, and the match ending in a draw. Dean Jones' sparkling first innings 157 earned him the man-of-the-match award.

Australia retained their 2–0 lead in the 1989 Ashes series after the third test.

=== Fourth Test ===
27 July – 1 August
Scorecard

England	v	Australia
260 (103 overs); Robin Smith 143 (285); Geoff Lawson 6/72 (33 overs)		447 (167.5 overs); Steve Waugh 92 (174); Angus Fraser 3/95 (36.5 overs)
264 (110.4 overs); Jack Russell 128* (293); Terry Alderman 5/66 (27 overs)		81/1 (32.5 overs); Mark Taylor 37* (83); John Emburey 1/30 (13 overs)

Australia won by 9 wickets
Old Trafford, Manchester
Umpires: John Hampshire (Eng) and Barrie Meyer (Eng)
Player of the match: Geoff Lawson (Australia)

- England won the toss and elected to bat.

England went into the fourth test still 2–0 down in the series, but knowing they had been reprieved by the weather in the third, and in desperate need of a win to get back into the series. Their only hopes of retaining the Ashes were by winning at least two of the remaining three tests, and at least leveling the series. An Australian win would mean their regaining the Ashes.

Once again, England opted to reshuffle their line-up, with batsmen Tavaré and Barnett both dropped for Robinson and the returning Robin Smith. The bowlers did not avoid the selectors' axe either, with Dilley and Jarvis replaced by Cook and Foster.

England was disappointing in their first innings, all out early on the second day for a seemingly insufficient 260, undone by a rampant Lawson who claimed career best figures of 6/72. An impressive century to Robin Smith the only highlight in a lacklustre display. The Australians replied with an impressive 447 driven by 4 half-centuries amongst their top six batsmen, and the fourth time in the series that they had done so. England's second innings was a mirror of the first, all out on the morning of the fifth day for 264, leaving the Australians with half a day to pick up the 78 runs required for victory, and the Ashes. A dogged not out century to wicket-keeper Jack Russell had delayed the inevitable, but when David Boon swept Nick Cook towards the square leg fence in the 32nd over of Australia's innings, the tourists passed the required mark and gained victory by 9 wickets, regaining the Ashes which England had held since 1985.

Day One

England won the toss and decided to bat first. Lawson gave the tourists an early breakthrough by clean-bowling Graham Gooch for 11. Tim Robinson, who had come into the side at number three, was out LBW bowled Lawson a few overs later, with England not having added to the score. Curtis again fell cheaply, clean bowled by Lawson for 22 and leaving England struggling at 57 for 3. Captain David Gower and the returning South African born Robin Smith worked to restore the innings with a diligent partnership of 75 for fourth wicket, but Gower was undone by the arm ball of off-spinner Trevor Hohns which struck him in front, and he was given out LBW for a well made 35. That bought champion batsman Ian Botham to the wicket, but he was out for a duck two overs later, bowled by Hohns. Jack Russell was trapped in front for 1 by Lawson a few overs later, and England's innings was disintegrating at 147 for 6. Emburey batted defensively to support Robin Smith, taking 34 balls to make his 5, but he too was eventually deceived by Hohns, out LBW. Some stubborn resistance by Neil Foster late in the day allowed Smith to bring up his century, and saw England finish the day on 224 for 7, Foster not out on 35 and Smith on 112.

Day Two

England began day two in the hope that Robin Smith could go on to a big score, and the tail would be there to provide support. Whilst Smith edged towards 150, the hoped for wagging of the tail did not emerge. Foster went early in the first session, and although the final two batsmen Angus Fraser and Nick Cook both absorbed a few overs each to help Smith move onto 143, neither really bothered the scorers, Fraser out for 2, and Cook was 0 not out when Smiths wicket finally fell, caught by Hohns off Merv Hughes. England all out for 260 early on day two.

Australia's unchanged opening pair Mark Taylor and Geoff Marsh emerged looking typically aggressive and soon were also looking untroubled by England's blunt bowling attack. The opening pair Foster and Fraser were soon replaced by Emburey and Cook, but England's bowling looked out of depth, and struggled to work out where to bowl and Marsh and Taylor set about scoring freely. After an opening stand of 135, Marsh was caught behind tantalisingly close to his fifty, out for 47 off the bowling of a reinvigorated Botham. The loss of his partner seemed to unsettle Taylor, and he too soon fell, stumped for 85 trying to advance down the wicket to Emburey. David Boon was unusually disappointing, clean bowled by Angus Fraser for 12, and in a rare bright period for England they had taken 3 for 12 to leave Australia on 154 for 3.

Dean Jones and Allan Border soon resumed business as usual, batting comfortably throughout the afternoon to see Australia to 3 for 219 at stumps. Jones was not out on 49, and Border not out on 19.

Day Three

The third day began with Australia trailing England by 41, with seven wickets in hand. Border and Jones continued where they had left off the previous evening, with the later posting his half-century soon after the resumption. The morning session was all Australia's, who soon went past England's total in a very one-sided session. A highlight of the destruction was Jones striking a clattering six into the stands off Emburey, before mis-timing to be clean bowled by Ian Botham for 69. This brought in-form Steve Waugh to the crease to join Border who was looking well set. Border soon brought up his fifty, the total passed 300, and then Waugh brought up his fifty. In a rare lapse during an otherwise perfect innings, Border snicked a thin edge to Russell off Foster, out for 80, with he and Waugh having added 88 for the fifth wicket. Foster trapped Australian wicket-keeper Ian Healy LBW for a golden duck the very next ball to be on a hat-trick, but his replacement Trevor Hohns easily blocked the hat-trick ball.

Hohns and Waugh took the Australian total past 400 for the fourth time in the series, with Waugh seemingly moving confidently towards another century. England fought back in the final session though, first removing Hohns, caught by Gower off Cook for a valiant 17 off 64 balls, and then Merv Hughes shortly after. Waugh, with only two bowlers remaining to bat with, seemed hurried to try to reach his century, and after having played masterfully throughout the day, began to rush things, which was to be his undoing. Without advancing the team total after Hughes' dismissal, Waugh fell for 92, caught by Curtis off the bowling of Angus Fraser. Numbers 10 and 11, Lawson and Alderman frustrated the England attack until stumps, not out on 13 and 5 respectively at stumps with Australia 441 for 9.

Day three had begun with the game still fairly evenly poised, it ended with Australia once again in the ascendancy, and taking control of the match.

Day Four

England began day four determined to put a quick end to the wagging of Australia's tail and did so, promptly removing Lawson with the addition of just six runs, Australia all out for 447, a first innings lead of 187. England needed solid partnerships and a good second innings score to fight their way back into the match, but received neither. Graham Gooch and Tim Curtis again opened the batting, but Curtis was out for a second ball duck caught by Boon who took a sharp chance close in at Bat-pad off Terry Alderman. A succession of regular wickets then ensued, England unable to put a partnership together.

Robinson was out LBW to Lawson for 12. Robin Smith caught behind by Healy off Alderman for 1. Gooch went next, caught Alderman bowled Lawson for 13, closely followed by Botham, LBW to Alderman for 4. Gower was caught cutting by Marsh at Gully for 15 off the bowling of Lawson, and England were reeling at 59 for 6. Australia smelt a route and were pressing the attack on all fronts with hostile bowling from an almost unplayable Alderman and an up-tempo Lawson. When either of them tired, England's 'relief' came in the form of pure intimidation from Merv Hughes, and Hohns, who was turning the ball well on a fairly even track.

All seemed lost for England until a defiant Jack Russell, ably supported by spinner John Emburey set about first blunting, and then when the opportunity arose, attacking the Australian bowlers. It was slow going, and often dourly defensive, but Russell and Emburey weathered the Australian attack, and set about adding to the total when they could. By stumps they had crawled along to 123 for 6, Russell not out on 47 and Emburey on 22. A vital partnership of 64 restoring some credibility to an England team threatening to collapse completely.

Day Five

England managed to push on with the job of restoring some pride to their innings on the morning of the fifth day, thanks largely to the heroics of Jack Russell. From his overnight 47 not out, Russell soon pushed past fifty, and his partner Emburey looked as though he wasn't going to surrender his wicket easily either. They batted throughout the morning adding to their overnight partnership of 64. Russell looked confident, and it seemed Australia's bowlers were lost for ideas on how to remove the pair. They looked as though they were willing to bat the day out and save the match. They soon took England past Australia's total, and set about building a lead, but with less than a days play remaining, an English victory looked out of the question. Emburey brought up his fifty, his first of the series. The pair looked to be quite comfortable, however soon after they had taken England past 200, Australia finally got the breakthrough they had sought. Alderman produced a brilliant outswinger which cut off the pitch, collecting the top of Emburey's off-stump, clean bowled for a well made 64.

His replacement Neil Foster batted for over half an hour in making 6, a clear sign England's hopes lay in batting out the day. However he too was eventually bowled by Alderman. Jack Russell brought up a deserved hundred, and whilst his heroics were in vain with no support around him, had the top order scored more the result may have been otherwise.

Foster's replacement, Angus Fraser, likewise frustrated the Australian's who were going for the kill. He batted for 40 minutes in making 3 runs, and allowed Russell to continue pushing the score along. Fraser was out cutting off Trevor Hohns, caught by Geoff Marsh and England were left at 255 for 9. Nick Cook wasn't able to repeat the stalling of his two previous teammates and last only 10 minutes and 11 balls, although he did strike a clean boundary in his 5 runs. When he was caught behind off Merv Hughes, he left Russell stranded on 128 not out and England had been dismissed for 264 runs, leaving Australia a target of 78 with the best part of two sessions to get the runs.

Taylor and Marsh went on the attack, sensing the possibility of a humiliating 10 wicket victory. However it was not to be. They made a solid opening stand of 62, but Marsh mistimed Emburey to be caught by Robinson for 31. That left Boon to come in, and he and Taylor mopped up the last few runs. Boon swept Nick Cook to the square leg boundary for four to bring up the winning runs, and Australia had regained the Ashes by taking an unassailable 3–0 lead with only two tests remaining to be played. Geoff Lawson's match figures of 9 for 153 earned him the man-of-the-match award.

Australia had won the fourth test by 9 wickets to lead the best of six match 1989 Ashes series 3–0.

=== Fifth Test ===
10–14 August
Scorecard

Australia	v	England
602/6d (206.3 overs); Mark Taylor 219 (461); Nick Cook 3/91 (40 overs)		255 (76.5 overs); Robin Smith 101 (150); Terry Alderman 5/69 (19 overs)
		167 (f/o) (55.3 overs); Michael Atherton 47 (127); Merv Hughes 3/46 (12.3 overs)

Australia won by an innings and 180 runs
Trent Bridge, Nottingham
Umpires: Nigel Plews (Eng) and David Shepherd (Eng)
Player of the match: Mark Taylor (Australia)

- Australia won the toss and elected to bat.
- Michael Atherton and Devon Malcolm made their Test debuts for England.

With the Ashes loss in four tests to an Australian side touted as supposedly the worst to ever tour England prior to the start of the series, the England side entered the fifth test looking demoralised and dejected. The English selectors once again chopped and changed their line-up, including the addition of two debutants – Michael Atherton, and Devon Malcolm. Despite the series having already been decided, it was the fifth test at Trent Bridge which truly defined the 1989 Ashes series. Having won the toss and confidently decided to bat, Border's charges piled on the runs once again. The opening stand of 329 between Mark Taylor and Geoff Marsh which lasted for nearly four sessions, the highest opening stand in an Ashes test, in any test in England, and the fifth highest partnership for the first wicket in all tests. Their stand allowed Australia to bat throughout day 2 and well into the third, reaching 600 for the second time in the series before declaring their innings closed with 6 wickets down.

With Terry Alderman again demolishing the demoralised England batting line-up, taking 5 for 69 to restrict them to 255, England were forced to follow on. They returned on the morning of day four with one first innings wicket in hand, and still 354 runs behind Australia. Their last wicket fell early on, and Border enforced the follow on. The second innings were much worse, lasting a disappointing 55 overs, all out for 167, the wickets being shared amongst the Australians.

Day One

The Australians arrived in Nottingham for the Trent Bridge test giddy after regaining the Ashes, and being the first Australian side to win a series in England since the 1975 Ashes series. The weather and pitch looked suited to batting, and so on winning the toss, Allan Border chose to do so. What happened next went down as a memorable moment in Ashes folklore.

England opened the bowling with the relatively inexperienced pair of Devon Malcolm and Angus Fraser, and Australia's opening batsmen Mark Taylor and Geoff Marsh tore them apart. The Nottingham crowd were treated to an exciting display of a mixture of stroke-play and powerful hitting. The pair batted throughout the morning and had soon passed 50. Botham and then Hemmings were brought in to bowl, but were equally ineffective. The Australians both looked set and determined, and rarely mis-timed or beaten.

By lunch the score had gone past 150, with both openers passing their half-centuries. After a well earned break, they resumed where they had left off, scoring freely throughout the afternoon. By tea they had gone past 200, Taylor the first to bring up his century, followed soon after by Marsh. The pair, as might be expected after such a long day, had slowed down in the final session, but by stumps Australia's score stood at 301 for 0. Taylor was not out on 141 and Marsh not out on 125. It was the first time ever in history that no wicket had fallen on the first day of a test match in England.

Day Two

The Australian opening pair started day two where they had left off the day before. Free-flowing strokes around the wicket kept the scoreboard ticking over, and England's bowlers looked lost. They had tried six bowlers – Fraser, Malcolm, Botham, Hemmings, Cook, and batsman Atherton – before the breakthrough finally came mid-morning. Geoff Marsh was eventually caught by Botham off the bowling of Cook for 138. His innings had lasted over 7 hours, facing 382 balls and he struck 15 fours. The innings was to remain his all-time test best.

The England team had finally removed one of the openers, but his partner remained steadfast in his concentration, and was now joined by a determined looking David Boon. Boon, who for much of the dark days of mid-1980s Australian cricket had remained the rock in the top order, had yet to score a century so far in the series, and looked set to try to right that wrong. He and Taylor breezed the Australian total past 350, Taylor bringing up his 150 in the process.

England had failed to capitalise on their breakthrough, and the Boon-Taylor partnership soon resumed the pace and tempo of the previous Taylor-Marsh one. They batted throughout the morning and Australia soon went past 400, with still only one wicket down. The England fielders looked tired and dejected. Mark Taylor soon brought up his personal 200, becoming the first Australian to score a double century in England since 1970. However, not long after, an exhausted looking Taylor tried to dance down the wicket once too often attempting to hit Cook down the ground, and was out excellently stumped by Russell for 219. His innings lasted just over 9 hours, during which he faced 461 balls and struck 23 fours. His dismissal saw Australia at 430 for 2, with the partnership of Boon and Taylor worth 101. It would remain Taylor's highest test score until he made an astonishing 334* during the 1998–99 Australia v Pakistan series.

Taylor's dismissal did not end the misery for England's bowlers however. Captain Allan Border came to the wicket seemingly inspired by the efforts of his top three. He and Boon took the score past 500, before Boon was likewise stumped by Russell off Cook, out for 73, a century still eluding his despite his consistent batting throughout the series. Dean Jones added a rapid 22, but was out caught by Gower off Angus Fraser, and the one highlight of the Australian innings for England came next when the in-form Steve Waugh was out for a duck. Wicket-keeper Ian Healy joined his captain, and the pair saw Australia to 560 for 5 at stumps.

Day Three

Day three began with a dejected England looking as though they knew they had no hope of extracting a victory from the test, and also knowing they would have to bat out at least two days to salvage a draw. But that was yet to come, as Border and Healy resumed Australia's mammoth total. England got the early breakthrough though, dismissing Healy, clean bowled by Fraser, second ball of the day without adding to the overnight total. Off-spinner Trevor Hohns joined captain Border, and the pair batted through the morning taking Australia past 600. Border unselfishly stuck to his declaration target of 600, even though it left his 35 shy of a century on 65, and declared Australia's innings closed shortly before lunch on 602 for 6, the second time in the series Australia had passed 600.

England were forced to face an awkward period before lunch, and duly obliged the tourists by succumbing to the pressure. Martyn Moxon fell to a third ball duck in the first over, caught by Waugh at point slashing at an out-swinger from Terry Alderman. Debutant Mike Atherton went two balls later, fooled by Alderman's now trademark in-swinging yorker which trapped him in front to be out LBW. England ended the first over 2 for 1. Tim Curtis fared little better, out a few overs later for 2, also out LBW to Alderman. Robin Smith and David Gower went someway to stabilising the England innings, but when captain Gower was tempted to play at an off-cutter outside the off stump by Geoff Lawson he got an outside edge and was caught behind for 11. Once again keeper Jack Russell was called upon to try to provide some lower order resistance for a failing England line-up. He did so, this time in the form of providing support for Smith, who started to look comfortable where the others had failed. Smith's stroke-play became audacious, even elegant at times. He soon moved past 50, but lost Russell soon after. The keeper-batsman caught behind by Healy off Lawson for 20. Hemmings likewise provided good support for Smith, chiming in with a useful 38, and helping Smith take the England total past 200 before he was spectacularly clean-bowled by Alderman. Smith soon crept over the line to make a well made century, but he was out 1 run later for 101, caught behind by Healy off Alderman, giving the West Australian yet another 5 wicket haul, his fifth of the series so far. Alderman finished the English first innings with 5 for 69.

The final session was one of minor frustrations for the Australia bowlers, who looked to knock over the England tail. First Fraser with 29, then an injured Ian Botham batting down the order with 11, and finally number 11 Devon Malcolm who along with fellow bowler Cook saw England survive to stumps, finishing the day on 246 for 9.

Day Four

The last England pair continued to frustrate the Australian bowlers for the first few overs of day four, adding an extra 9 runs for the last wicket, but eventually Malcolm was out caught behind off Merv Hughes for 9, and England's first innings came to a close for 255 in 76.5 overs. Still 347 behind the Australian total, Border had no hesitation in making England follow on. Captain Gower decided that a captain's innings leading from the front was necessary, and promoted himself to number one in the order. Despite striking one glorious 4, it backfired spectacularly when he was out for 5 on the fifth ball of the innings, clean bowled by Geoff Lawson. Curtis added 6 and there was to be no heroics from Smith in the second innings, out for 26 to leave England at 67 for 3. Debutant Atherton looked to be finding his feet, despite being on the receiving end of some hostile bowling, and even more hostile sledging from Merv Hughes, and moved awkwardly on towards 50. He and demoted Moxon added a useful 49 for the fourth wicket, before Moxon succumbed to a peach of an in-swinging yorker by Alderman to have his off stump cart-wheeling backwards out of the ground.

Russell could only add 1, clean bowled by Lawson, and when Atherton was caught and bowled by off-spinner Trevor Hohns for 47, a frustrating three shy of a debut half-century, England were again reeling on 120 for 6. Lunch brought little reprieve for England, who seemed consigned to their fate. Fraser could add only 1 before he was undone by the spin of Hohns and clean-bowled. Hemmings had kept the score creeping slowly along with a determined 35 was out LBW to Hughes and when Malcolm was clean bowled by Hughes for 5 a few overs later, leaving England 167 for 9, it was decided the match was lost, and England did not wish to risk injured Botham, who went 'absent hurt', England all out for 167. Mark Taylor's brilliant 219 earned him the man-of-the-match award.

Australia had won the fifth test of the 1989 Ashes series by an innings and 180 runs inside four days to lead the best of 6 test series 4–0.

=== Sixth Test ===
24–29 August
Scorecard

Australia	v	England
468 (132.3 overs); Dean Jones 122 (180); Derek Pringle 4/70 (24.3 overs)		285 (92.1 overs); David Gower 79 (120); Terry Alderman 5/66 (27 overs)
219/4d (63 overs); Allan Border 51* (74); David Capel 1/35 (8 overs)		143/5 (46.1 overs); Robin Smith 77* (99); Terry Alderman 2/30 (13 overs)

Match drawn
The Oval, London
Umpires: Dickie Bird (Eng) and Ken Palmer (Eng)
Player of the match: Dean Jones (Australia)

- Australia won the toss and elected to bat.
- Alan Igglesden and John Stephenson made their Test debuts for England.

Going into the sixth test at the Oval, all England could hope for was to salvage some pride in the form of at least a solitary test win. However the hosts had looked unlikely to challenge the tourists for all but a few sessions during the whole series. England made two more changes, the introduction of debutants Alan Igglesden and John Stephenson, but the picks seemed more likely to have come from the chance to expose them to the top level rather than hope that they might prove competitive against a clearly superior Australian side. Australia remained unchanged since the second test.

Australia won the toss, batted, and compiled over 400 runs for the sixth time in as many tests. Only rain interruptions denied Australia the chance of victory. England's bowlers again looked out of their depth against an in-form Australian top order led by centurion Dean Jones' sparkling 122 from 180 balls. In reply England were once again dismissed for under 300, despite excellent half-centuries to captain David Gower and bowler Gladstone Small.

Australia took their second innings to 219 for 4 declared, thanks to half-centuries from Allan Border and first innings centurion Jones, setting England an unlikely target of 403 in a day. Rain again intervened, but despite the interruptions the Australian bowlers made every effort to squeeze victory out of the shortened match, reducing England to 143 for 5, despite a well made 77 to Robin Smith, when play was eventually abandoned and the match ended in a draw.

Day One

Australia won the toss again, and chose to bat. Openers Marsh and Taylor again got the tourists off to a solid start, but their heroics of the fifth test were not to be repeated, as Marsh was caught by debutant Igglesden off Galdstone Small for 17, the opening stand worth 48. David Boon came to the wicket and looked at ease, as he and Taylor set about building a solid second wicket partnership. The pair batted throughout the morning, and Taylor soon brought up his fifty. The young New South Welshman had been in majestic form throughout the series, and England had no answers for the well-timed left-hander. He pulled and drove with ease once again, to bring up his milestone. Boon likewise approached his half-century, but soon lost his partner Taylor, who rarely edged a ball outside off-stump of the bowling of Igglesden to be caught behind, and give the bowler his first ever test wicket. Taylor had gone for 71, and Australia were 130 for 2. Boon fell shortly after for 46, bringing Dean Jones to the wicket to partner his captain Allan Border. The pair seemed to enjoy each other's company, and once again built a solid 4th wicket partnership, batting throughout the remainder of the first day. Jones was in a hurry and scored freely, all around the wicket, working the field for quick singles and twos, and picking off the bad balls for four. Shortly before stumps he brought up his second century of the tour. At stumps on day one, Australia ended on 325 for 3, with Border not out on 66 and Jones on 114 not out.

Day Two

It must have seemed like déjà vu for England as they started day two, with Australia again poised for a large total. Border and Jones resumed and added a further 20 before Border was caught behind of Capel for 76. Jones was finally removed for 122, and Steve Waugh, who seemed to have gone off the boil slightly following his blistering first three tests, went for a disappointing 14, clean bowled by Igglesden. Rain interrupted temporarily, but play soon resumed, and the South London crowd was then treated with a blistering display of low-order hitting from Queensland-born keeper Ian Healy, who battered 44 off 44 balls. His innings lasted less than an hour and contained six 4s, also taking the Australian total past 400 for the sixth time in as many tests. Eventually he fell, caught behind of the bowling of Derek Pringle, who then proceeded to tear into the tail, collecting the last four wickets. Although Trevor Hohns (30) and Merv Hughes (21) lasted long enough to take the Australian total to 468, the tourists were all out shortly before stumps. Enough play was left to force England to face an awkward few overs, and the Australians made the most of it, dislodging Graham Gooch LBW to Alderman for a third ball duck. England finished the day on 1 for 1, both not out batsmen yet to score.

Day Three

Although rain had threatened day two, it ruined day three. Enough play was had to get through 30-odd overs, but the interruptions were regular, and prevented both the Australian bowlers and the England batsmen from developing any sort of momentum. John Stephenson contributed 25 on debut, and captain David Gower ended the day on 43 not out, England yet again in diabolical trouble at 124 for 6.

Day Four

Day four began with more rain clouds looming, but holding off for the time being. Gower managed to push on from his overnight 43 to reach 76, and 27 from Derek Pringle, 31 to Nick Cook, and a well made 59 to number 9 Gladstone Small got England to 285, and avoid the follow-on. Terry Alderman had taken his sixth 5 wicket haul with figures of 5 for 66.

After a short rain interruption Australia began their second innings, and in a rare failure for the series, Marsh was trapped LBW by Igglesden for 4. It was business as usual for Taylor and Boon though, who soon took the total past 50. By stumps the Australians were 87 for 1, with Taylor not out on 43, Boon not out on 29, and with a lead of 270.

Day Five

Going into day five, the Australians sought to set a quick total, and try to give themselves enough time to bowl England out inside a day. They had accomplished the feat already during the series, but the weather continued to threaten over London. The tourists wanted quick runs, and Taylor attempted to attack from the outset, but was undone after adding just two runs caught behind off Small for 48. Boon was soon run out for 37, also trying to lift the run-rate, and then Border and Jones again combined to go on the attack. Border made 51 not out off 74 balls, and although Jones eventually fell, bowled by Capel for 50 off 69 balls, the pair had added a rapid partnership of 89. Steve Waugh joined his captain, but his stay was short lived, as they soon passed Border's desired target score of 400. The Australian second innings was declared closed on 219 for 4, leaving England an unlikely target of 403 of just over two sessions.

The weather continued to threaten Australia's chances of victory, but when Alderman cheaply removed first Stephenson (LBW for 11), then Gooch (caught and bowled for 10), and Lawson removed Atherton (bowled for 14), the Australians smelt victory. England were reduced further when Gower was caught at cover for 17 by Waugh off Lawson, and at 67 for 4, things seemed dire. Robin Smith came to the rescue, steadying the innings, and a very defensive 17 from Capel bought the hosts enough time to avoid defeat. Capel was eventually caught at slip by Taylor off Lawson, and Russell joined Smith who had brought up his half century. He finished not out on 77. The pair eventually survived to the end of play, taking England to 5 for 143 and earning a draw. Rain had again seemingly denied Australia victory in a match they thoroughly dominated. Jones was named man-of-the-match for his first innings 122 and second innings 50.

The match ended in a draw with Australia winning the best of six 1989 Ashes series 4–0.

== Post-Series ==
Allan Border's tourists became the first Australian side to win an Ashes series in England since Ian Chappell's tourists won the 1975 Ashes series in England. In doing so they became the first Australian side to regain the Ashes in England since Bill Woodfull's side did so in the 1934 Ashes series.

The Australian series victory began a 14-year period of Australian dominance that would see the Australians win the next three Ashes series in England, and four Ashes series in Australia, until England eventually regained the Ashes in the 2005 Ashes series.

It also marked a turning point in the history of the Australian cricket team, which had struggled to come to terms with the impact of World Series Cricket throughout the 1980s, and was at an all-time low. The 1989 Ashes series sparked a rejuvenation of Australian cricket, which would see them rise to replace the West Indies as the world's predominant Test cricket team by the mid-1990s, and break the record for consecutive test match victories by the end of that decade.

In contrast, the one-sided nature of the series led to David Gower standing down as captain, and saw him replaced with Graham Gooch prior to the next series against the West Indies in the Caribbean. The England side went on a down turn, and despite featuring as losing finalists in the 1992 Cricket World Cup three years later, struggled for consistency for much of the next decade.

== Records ==
=== Individual records ===
Most runs	Mark Taylor (Aus)	839
Most wickets	Terry Alderman (Aus)	41
Most catches (excluding wicket keepers)	David Boon (Aus)	9
Highest individual innings	Mark Taylor (Aus)	219 (5th test, 1st innings)
Best innings bowling	Geoff Lawson (Aus)	6/72 (4th test, 1st innings)
Highest match total	Mark Taylor (Aus)	219 (5th test)
Best match bowling	Terry Alderman (Aus)	10 (1st test)

== Team records ==
Best Innings	Australia	602/6d. (5th test, 1st innings)
Worst Innings	England	167 (5th test, 2nd innings)
Tosses Won	Draw	3–3 (out of 6)

== Other records ==
- Mark Taylor's 839 runs for series was the third highest ever Ashes (or any) series total (behind Don Bradman with 974 in 1930 and Wally Hammond with 905 in 1928/29). The record still stands as of 2026.
- Mark Taylor and Geoff Marsh's first wicket partnership of 329 in the fifth test at Trent Bridge, Nottingham was the highest ever score for the first wicket in a test match in England, the first time no wicket had fallen on the first day of a test match in England, and the ninth highest Ashes partnership overall.
- Steve Waugh's series average of 126.50 (total 506 runs) was the fourth highest Ashes series average.
- Terry Alderman's 41 wickets for the series was the fifth equal highest series tally and the joint second highest (behind himself with 42 in 1981) for any Australian bowler in an Ashes series equalling Rodney Hogg's efforts in the 1978/79 series.
