= Igglesden =

Igglesden is a surname. Notable people with the surname include:

- Alan Igglesden (1964–2021), English test cricketer
- Charles Igglesden (1861–1949), English editor of the Kentish Express
- Henry Igglesden (1827–1907), English founder of the Kentish Express
