= Australian cricket team in England in 1989 =

International cricket tour

The Australian cricket team toured England in the 1989 season to play a six-match Test series against England. The tour also included matches in Wales, Scotland, the Netherlands and Denmark. Australia won the series 4–0 with two matches drawn. Australia therefore regained The Ashes.

== Touring party ==
- Allan Border (captain)
- Geoff Marsh (vice captain)
- Terry Alderman
- David Boon
- Greg Campbell
- Ian Healy
- Trevor Hohns
- Merv Hughes
- Dean Jones
- Geoff Lawson
- Tim May
- Tom Moody
- Carl Rackemann
- Mark Taylor
- Mike Veletta
- Steve Waugh
- Tim Zoehrer

== Test series summary ==
- 1st Test at Headingley – Australia won by 210 runs
- 2nd Test at Lord's Cricket Ground – Australia won by 6 wickets
- 3rd Test at Edgbaston – match drawn
- 4th Test at Old Trafford – Australia won by 9 wickets
- 5th Test at Trent Bridge – Australia won by an innings and 180 runs
- 6th Test at The Oval – match drawn

== One Day Internationals (ODIs) ==
The series was drawn 1–1 with one tied match. By losing fewer wickets in the tied game, England won the Texaco Trophy.

=== 1st ODI ===
25 May 1989
Scorecard

England; 231/9 (55 overs)	v	Australia; 136 (47.1 overs)
GA Gooch 52 (111); GF Lawson 3/48 (11 overs)		SR Waugh 35 (74); NA Foster 3/29 (10 overs)

England won by 95 runs
Old Trafford, Manchester
Umpires: JW Holder and NT Plews
Player of the match: PAJ DeFreitas (ENG)

- England won the toss and elected to bat.
- SJ Rhodes (ENG) made his England debut.

=== 2nd ODI ===
27 May 1989
Scorecard

England; 226/5 (55 overs)	v	Australia; 226/8 (55 overs)
AJ Lamb 100* (105); TBA May 2/35 (11 overs)		SR Waugh 43 (61); JE Emburey 2/47 (11 overs)

Match tied
Trent Bridge, Nottingham
Umpires: HD Bird and JH Hampshire
Player of the match: AJ Lamb (ENG)

- England won the toss and elected to bat.

=== 3rd ODI ===
29 May 1989
Scorecard

England; 278/7 (55 overs)	v	Australia; 279/4 (54.3 overs)
GA Gooch 136 (162); TM Alderman 3/36 (11 overs)		GR Marsh 111* (162); NA Foster 2/57 (11 overs)

Australia won by 6 wickets
Lord's, London
Umpires: BJ Meyer and DR Shepherd
Player of the match: GR Marsh (AUS)

- England won the toss and elected to bat.

== Other matches ==
- Australians v League Cricket Conference XI at Dartmouth, 5 May 1989
- Australians v Duchess of Norfolk's XI at Arundel, 7 May 1989
- Sussex v Australians at Hove, 9 May 1989
- Marylebone Cricket Club v Australians at Lord's, 11 May 1989
- Worcestershire v Australians at Worcester, 13–14 May 1989
- Somerset v Australians at Taunton, 17–19 May 1989
- Middlesex v Australians at Lord's, 20–22 May 1989
- Yorkshire v Australians at Leeds, 23 May 1989

=== First-class match: Warwickshire v Australians at Birmingham ===
31 May - 2 June 1989
Scorecard

Australians	v	Warwickshire
444/3d (93.4 overs); Dean Jones 248 (284); Asif Din 1/36 (6.4 overs)		235 (77.3 overs); Geoff Humpage 58 (99); Trevor Hohns 4/87 (27.3 overs)
195/4d (61 overs); Allan Border 69 (141); Tim Munton 2/60 (21 overs)		105/3 (37 overs); Asif Din 38 (28); Greg Campbell 1/15 (7 overs)

Match drawn
Edgbaston Cricket Ground, Birmingham
Umpires: Roy Palmer (Eng) and Nigel Plews (Eng)
Player of the match: Dean Jones (Aus)

- Australians won the toss and batted
- Derbyshire v Australians at Derby, 3-5 Jun 1989
- Lancashire v Australians at Manchester, 14-16 Jun 1989
- Northamptonshire v Australians at Northampton, 17-19 Jun 1989
- Australians v Oxford and Cambridge Universities at The Parks, 28 Jun 1989
- Glamorgan v Australians at Neath, 1-3 Jul 1989
- Australians v Scotland at Glasgow, 15 Jul 1989
- Australians v Minor Counties at Trowbridge, 17 Jul 1989
- Hampshire v Australians at Southampton, 19-21 Jul 1989
- Gloucestershire v Australians at Bristol, 22-23 Jul 1989
- Nottinghamshire v Australians at Nottingham, 2-4 Aug 1989
- Leicestershire v Australians at Leicester, 5-7 Aug 1989
- Kent v Australians at Canterbury, 16-18 Aug 1989
- Essex v Australians at Chelmsford, 19-21 Aug 1989
- Australians v The Netherlands at The Hague, 2 Sep 1989
- Australians v The Netherlands at The Hague, 3 Sep 1989
- Australians v Denmark at Bronsby Stadium, 5 Sep 1989
- Australians v Denmark at Slagelse Stadium, 6 Sep 1989

== Annual reviews ==
- Playfair Cricket Annual 1990
- Wisden Cricketers' Almanack 1990
