= Jack Russell (cricketer, born 1963) =

English cricketer

Jack Russell MBE
Personal information
- Full name: Robert Charles Russell
- Born: 15 August 1963 (age 63); Stroud, Gloucestershire, England
- Height: 5 ft 8.5 in (1.74 m)
- Batting: Left-handed
- Bowling: Right arm off break
- Role: Wicket-keeper

International information
- National side: England
- Test debut (cap 536): 25 August 1988 v Sri Lanka
- Last Test: 24 March 1998 v West Indies
- ODI debut (cap 96): 22 November 1987 v Pakistan
- Last ODI: 25 October 1998 v South Africa

Domestic team information
- Years: Team
- 1981–2004: Gloucestershire

Career statistics
Competition	Test	ODI	FC	LA
Matches	54	40	465	479
Runs scored	1,897	423	16,861	6,626
Batting average	27.10	17.62	30.93	24.09
100s/50s	2/6	0/1	11/89	2/25
Top score	128*	50	129*	119*
Balls bowled	–	–	56	–
Wickets	–	–	1	–
Bowling average	–	–	68.00	–
5 wickets in innings	–	–	0	–
10 wickets in match	–	–	0	–
Best bowling	–	–	1/4	–
Catches/stumpings	153/12	41/6	1,192/128	465/98
- Source: Cricinfo, 20 August 2009

Robert Charles "Jack" Russell (born 15 August 1963) is an English retired international cricketer, now known for his abilities as an artist, as a cricket wicketkeeping coach, and a football goalkeeping coach.

In the 1996 Birthday Honours, he was appointed Member of the Order of the British Empire (MBE) for services to cricket.

== Early life and education ==
Russell was born in Stroud, Gloucestershire, England. His enthusiasm for sport started with his father, John, who played for Chalford Cricket Club, where Russell would field when the team was short, fielding from fine-leg to fine-leg. He became a first class cricketer after developing his skills at Stroud Cricket Club, and at Archway School. He was spotted by Gloucestershire Scout and local man, Frank Birt. Two days before his fourteenth birthday, he saw a catch on television: McCosker, caught Knott, bowled Greig, at Headingley in 1977. Russell himself has commented: "Low-down, one-handed, across first-slip. Brilliant. I thought then that I would like to be able to do that. That's where it started; that was the inspiration [for becoming a wicket keeper].”

The other inspiration cited was the death of his brother, David, of a brain haemorrhage; Russell quickly rededicated himself. Archway School's sports masters, Ricky Rutter and Graham Fryer, guided Russell towards Gloucestershire County Cricket Club; where he came under the wing of County Coach Graham Wiltshire, and, as a result, Russell stayed at Archway for two years of Sixth-Form college. He then headed to Bristol Technical College to study accountancy, but after three months he left to join Gloucestershire full-time in 1982.

== County and Test career ==
It was not until his late teens that it was pointed out that he would turn into an international wicket-keeper, as he was a budding fast bowler that was building up a good reputation at junior level. He was clocked at 75 mph at the age of 14, although the only issue was that the majority of his bowling was waist-high. He then moved onto unorthodox off-breaks, which were deemed illegal right from the start, and so he started to keep wicket for his school.

Russell made his test debut for England against Sri Lanka in 1988, nearly becoming the only player to score a century for England as a nightwatchman.

Russell would be involved in a number of controversial Test selections. He was frequently passed over in favour of Alec Stewart on account of the latter's superior batting ability. Russell, however, was considered the best wicket keeper in the world at the time, and could also be an unorthodox but resolute lower-order batsman. In 1990, he was one of Wisden's five Cricketers of the Year, with Wisden stating:

At the beginning of 1989, Jack Russell had played only one Test for England, and was not considered a good-enough batsman to merit a place in the one-day squad to face the Australians. By the end of the year, he was the only Englishman who could justifiably expect a place in anyone's World XI.

It was his batting that got the fans on their feet – not the high scores, but the determination to stay and grit it out against the Australians. So, with mentor Alan Knott, Russell turned up early for the second Test at Lord's, and for four hours had the MCC ground staff boys bowling plastic balls at him – without Russell batting a stroke, just ducking and diving to miss the short deliveries. That day, he also adopted some suitably pungent language in response to the Aussies' sledging, and after he had scored 64 not out, the Aussies never tried it on him again. In the third Test at Edgbaston, he scored 42, the second highest score of the first innings. But his greatest achievement was to come in the fourth Test at Old Trafford. Amid the controversies of the rebel South African cricket tour and facing near-certain defeat, he held up Aussie celebrations for six hours by scoring his highest-ever score in cricket, 128 not out, to almost save the Test for England. It was also his maiden century in all forms of cricket, an achievement only matched by one other Englishman in the twentieth century – Billy Griffith against West Indies in 1947–48 – but it was largely forgotten in the furore of the South African debacle, and the loss of the series. Russell finished the Ashes series as England's third-most-successful batsman, with 314 runs and an average of 39.25.

The summer of 1989 gave Russell a run in the England side, but his batting rarely reached such heights again. With England commonly struggling in these years, to give the side more balance Alec Stewart often got the gloves ahead of Russell due to his superior batting and increasingly reliable keeping. England's dilemma was epitomised in an unusual incident in the third test of the Ashes in 1991 when Russell dismissed Dean Jones stumped off the bowling of Gladstone Small, at the time a manner of dismissal only commonly pulled off from spin bowlers. In spite of this indication of Russell's skill behind the stumps, with results poor, England dropped him for the next test in order to accommodate another bowler. The Wisden review of the tour observed: "It was an ironic reflection on the gulf between the teams that Jack Russell, the one Englishman other than Gooch who could have been certain of selection for a Combined XI, was unable to hold his place as England's wicket-keeper because of the length and helplessness of the tail".

Russell remained a popular figure, and his exclusion from the England side for the tour of India and Sri Lanka in 1992, along with that of David Gower and (initially) Ian Salisbury, sparked public outrage. It also hardly helped the side, who lost all four Test matches on the tour. He would still thereafter be called up when England needed a good man behind the stumps, and had some successes, helping to steady a nervous run chase during a rare victory against the West Indies at Old Trafford in 1995, Christopher Martin-Jenkins observing on this occasion that "the fighting qualities and underestimated batting skill of Jack Russell" helped England to overcome a "crisis". Russell's ability to stay at the wicket was again demonstrated on 4 December 1995 against South Africa in Johannesburg where he shared a stand of 119 with Michael Atherton to help England save the match. He batted for 4 hours 34 mins scoring just 29 off 235 balls, and of those scoring runs from only 14 of those balls. It is symptomatic of how wicketkeepers' contributions behind the stumps are neglected that it is often forgotten that, in the same match, Russell also broke the Test world record for the most dismissals in a match (a record now held jointly with A. B. de Villiers and Rishabh Pant).

The following summer Russell made his second and last Test century, against India at Lord's, helping again to secure a draw for England, and winning the man of the match award. Yet three test matches later, with England struggling against Pakistan, as Wisden observed: "Once again, Russell was the first casualty of England's bid to level the series. Atherton's statement after Headingley that they would not sacrifice the wicket-keeper showed that a week in sport is about as long as seven days in politics". Curiously at the time Russell had a better batting average in Tests for a designated wicketkeeper over the time period encompassing his career than Stewart, or any England player. But Stewart made his first Test century as a wicketkeeper that winter, and Russell would only thereafter play five more Tests.

Eventually after an unsuccessful final tour of the West Indies in 1998, he decided to retire after being left out of the following winter's Ashes tour squad. Former England wicketkeeper Godfrey Evans commented that Russell "was discarded not because of anything he'd done but because Alec [Stewart] was a better bat and they were trying to cover for the lack of a proper all-rounder. There was a terrible irony about all this: we were the worst Test team in the world and our one player of undeniable world class couldn't get into the side."

Russell turned himself into part of the hub of Gloucestershire's one-day success, and together with captain Mark Alleyne won a couple of ODI caps. In 2002, he set a world record when conceding no byes in Northamptonshire's mammoth 746–9 declared. After an inconsistent season due to persistent back problems, he retired from county cricket in 2004, just short of the age of 41.

== Character ==
Russell was known for his painting, and his protective attitude to his family life. None of his Gloucestershire team-mates were ever invited to his home, and he claimed if they ever asked he would be more than willing if they agreed to be blindfolded; the builders who constructed the extension to it were subjected to the same treatment.

His fitness regime included running every day, and while driving between games Russell would be clad in a sleeping bag with the bottom cut out, so as not to get a chill in his back and legs. He reverted to driving an automatic vehicle so as not to put extra strain on his left leg by consistently using the clutch.

Some of his more notable oddities included a diet to supplement his extreme fitness regime, which consisted largely of tea, biscuits, and baked beans. Like his mentor, Alan Knott, a heavy tea drinker, Russell would often get through 20 cups a day. He used to dip the tea bag in once, add plenty of milk, then hang it on a nail ready for subsequent use. In the final Test of the 1989 Ashes series (against Australia) at the Oval, Derek Pringle counted that he used the same bag for all five days, which roughly equates to 100 cups. For lunch, Russell would eat two Weetabix, soaked for exactly fifteen minutes in cold milk. He was one of the first to eat bananas on the field of play at drinks break. For dinner, steak and chips or chicken without skin was a favourite meal – Russell once spent every night of a Test at a Chinese restaurant in Perth, ordering chicken and cashews: without the cashews.

He also insisted on always wearing the same battered old flowerpot sunhat during his time out in the field, a constant companion from his debut in 1981 to his last game in 2004. Russell lined up the ball with the specially cut back rim, but it ended up rather worn out. Only his wife Aileen was allowed to repair it, while Russell carried an emergency repair kit of cotton thread and rubber. Its state of age and hence apparent disrepair caused more than one argument with the authorities. Russell refused to wear the official coloured one-day sunhat in South Africa, with a compromise only reached when it was agreed the hat was indeed coloured because it was an off-grey. On one occasion in the West Indies, Russell placed it in an oven to dry; a few minutes later the hat was overbaked and caught fire, and was only just rescued from total incineration – the top collapsed like puff pastry on removal.

Russell has stated his desire that his hands be amputated after his death, and preserved in formaldehyde.

== Art ==
Although not studying art at school, he had an interest in art, expressed at an early age through diorama railway modelling. During a rainy early-season county cricket game at Worcestershire, while sitting waiting for the rain to stop, he walked into town and bought a sketch-pad and some pencils.

If Rembrandt can do it, then why can't I...?'. That first day, I strolled along the Severn at the back of the ground, but I was so shy that whenever someone came along, I'd hide the sketch-pad.

When England toured Pakistan in 1987, Russell had two days' cricket in a six-week tour, so kept his mind sane through sketching and photography. On return to the UK, he displayed 40 sketches in a gallery in Bristol; they sold out in two days.

Russell now has his own gallery in Chipping Sodbury, and exhibits in London, displaying a portfolio of sights and scenes of his home area in Gloucestershire, architecture, classic military battlefields, and wildlife. Russell also undertakes commissions, and has painted comedian Eric Sykes (a fellow wicket keeper), Norman Wisdom, Bobby Charlton, Eric Clapton, Henry Allingham, Harry Patch, HRH Duke of Kent, and HRH Prince Philip, Duke of Edinburgh. He has been greatly influenced by other artists including Rembrandt, Turner, Constable, Whistler, John Singer Sargent, Trevor Chamberlain ROI, and David Shepherd OBE.

== Post-retirement ==
In 2007, Russell was appointed goal-keeping coach for football team Forest Green Rovers then playing in the Conference National. After his mentorship from Alan Knott throughout his own career, Russell later provided one-to-one coaching for wicket-keeper Geraint Jones. He also provided coaching and mentorship at Gloucestershire in 2008.

In 2018, he was wicket-keeping coach at Middlesex.
