= John Stephenson (cricketer, born 1965) =

English cricketer (born 1965)

Personal information
- Full name: John Patrick Stephenson
- Born: 14 March 1965 (age 61); Stebbing, Essex, England
- Nickname: Stanley, Svenson, Leo
- Height: 6 ft 1 in (1.85 m)
- Batting: Right-handed
- Bowling: Right-arm medium

International information
- National side: England
- Only Test (cap 541): 24 August 1989 v Australia

Domestic team information
- Years: Team
- 1985–1994: Essex
- 1988/89: Boland
- 1988/89: Impalas
- 1995–2001: Hampshire
- 2002–2004: Essex

Career statistics
| Competition | Test | FC | LA |
|---|---|---|---|
| Matches | 1 | 304 | 319 |
| Runs scored | 36 | 14,773 | 7,252 |
| Batting average | 18.00 | 32.39 | 29.36 |
| 100s/50s | 0/0 | 25/78 | 8/38 |
| Top score | 25 | 202* | 142 |
| Balls bowled | – | 23,018 | 9,216 |
| Wickets | – | 396 | 270 |
| Bowling average | – | 32.55 | 26.40 |
| 5 wickets in innings | – | 11 | 3 |
| 10 wickets in match | – | 1 | 0 |
| Best bowling | – | 7/44 | 6/33 |
| Catches/stumpings | 0/– | 182/– | 122/– |
- Source: CricketArchive, 11 January 2008

John Patrick Stephenson (born 14 March 1965) is an English former first-class cricketer, who is currently CEO of WA Cricket.

The cricket writer, Colin Bateman, commented on Stephenson's Test match appearance, "by the time John Stephenson was picked in 1989, England's selection policy resembled one of those bingo machines in which numbered balls are blown up a tube at random". Bateman added, "Stephenson, an intelligent, useful all-round cricketer, became player No. 29 used by England in a shambolic series – a post-war record".

== Life and career ==
He was educated at Felsted School and Durham University. While an undergraduate he was awarded a palatinate for cricket in 1986. He had a long county cricket career as a right-handed batsman and a right-arm medium bowler for Essex (1985–1994 and 2002–2004) and Hampshire (1995–2001). He also captained Hampshire between 1996 and 1997. He helped Essex win the County Championship in 1986, 1991 and 1992.

Stephenson was a One Test Wonder, playing only one Test match against Australia at The Oval in 1989, opening the batting alongside Essex colleague Graham Gooch. His call up was assisted by a timely century for an England XI against a Netherlands XI a week before his Test Match. Later in his career he was twice picked to tour with the England A team (to Zimbabwe in 1989–90 and West Indies in 1991–92). He enjoyed some success as a bowler on the latter tour, taking 5 for 53 in the third unofficial "Test". He was also part of the England squad which won the Hong Kong Sixes tournament in 1993.

He was appointed Head of Cricket at the MCC in mid-2004, and thereafter appeared only in a handful of MCC matches. He was responsible for MCC's playing and touring programmes, the strategic management of the playing and practice areas at Lord's, and supervision of the MCC Young Cricketers programme. Stephenson left MCC and took up the role of CEO at Essex County Cricket Club in October 2021.

In July 2024, Stephenson was appointed CEO of WA Cricket.

== See also ==
- One Test Wonder

Sporting positions
| Preceded by Mark Nicholas | Hampshire cricket captain 1996–1997 | Succeeded by Robin Smith |
