= Robin Smith (cricketer) =

English cricketer (1963–2025)

Personal information
- Full name: Robin Arnold Smith
- Born: 13 September 1963; Durban, Natal Province, South Africa
- Died: 1 December 2025 (aged 62); Perth, Western Australia, Australia
- Nickname: Judge
- Height: 5 ft 11 in (1.80 m)
- Batting: Right-handed
- Bowling: Leg break
- Relatives: Chris Smith (brother)

International information
- National side: England
- Test debut (cap 530): 21 July 1988 v West Indies
- Last Test: 2 January 1996 v South Africa
- ODI debut (cap 101): 4 September 1988 v Sri Lanka
- Last ODI: 9 March 1996 v Sri Lanka

Domestic team information
- Years: Team
- 1980/81–1984/85: Natal
- 1982–2003: Hampshire (squad no. 1)

Career statistics
Competition	Test	ODI	FC	LA
Matches	62	71	426	443
Runs scored	4,236	2,419	26,155	14,927
Batting average	43.67	39.01	41.51	41.12
100s/50s	9/28	4/15	61/131	27/81
Top score	175	167*	209*	167*
Balls bowled	24	–	1,099	27
Wickets	0	–	14	3
Bowling average	–	–	70.92	5.33
5 wickets in innings	–	–	0	0
10 wickets in match	–	–	0	0
Best bowling	–	–	2/11	2/13
Catches/stumpings	39/–	26/–	233/–	159/–
Medal record
Men's Cricket
Representing England
ICC Cricket World Cup
Runner-up	1992 Australia and New Zealand
- Source: Cricinfo, 5 October 2009

Robin Arnold Smith (13 September 1963 – 1 December 2025) was a South African-born English cricketer. He was a part of the English squad which finished as runners-up at the 1992 Cricket World Cup.

Smith was nicknamed Judge or Judgie for his resemblance to a judge when he grew his hair long. Like his older brother Chris, he was unable to play for the country of his birth because of the exclusion of the apartheid regime from international cricket, but because he had British parents he qualified to play for England.

He played for England in eleven home test series and on six overseas tours from 1988 to 1996. Smith was best known for his ability against fast bowling, with what was regarded as a trademark square-cut that he hit ferociously. He trained to be a psychologist.

== County career ==
In county cricket, Smith played for Hampshire, captaining them from 1998 to 2002, before retiring from first-class cricket in 2003. He helped Hampshire to win the Benson and Hedges Cup in 1988 and 1992, and the NatWest Trophy in 1991, winning the man of the match award in the last two finals.

Until Kevin Pietersen (another English cricketer born in South Africa) was signed by Hampshire from Nottinghamshire in 2005, Smith was Hampshire's most successful England batsman since C. B. Fry.

== International career ==
=== Early days ===
Robin Arnold Smith was born in Durban, South Africa on 13 September 1963. He completed his high school education at Northwood School. The School honoured his career achievements by naming the 1st team cricket oval after him. In his first Test at Headingley in 1988, he shared a century partnership with fellow South African-born batsman Allan Lamb. This was one of very few century partnerships for England during the series against the firepower of the West Indies fast bowlers. The following summer, 1989, Smith was the only successful England batsman in the Ashes series making two centuries. In his second hundred at Trent Bridge, he arrived with England already three wickets down chasing 600, and played some powerful shots – particularly off Mervyn Hughes whose bowling figures were, at one point 4–0–38–0.

=== Prominence ===
Smith's highest test score, 175 against the West Indies in Antigua, was made as England replied to Brian Lara's record-breaking innings of 375. Despite his domination of fast, aggressive bowling, Smith suffered from a well-publicised vulnerability to slower bowlers. Although as ever he performed well against the opposition fast bowlers, his struggles against spin first came to prominence when he struggled against Mushtaq Ahmed in the 1992 test series against Pakistan and, then again in England's tour of India the following winter. In the one-off test against Sri Lanka that followed, he was promoted to open the batting so that he would face less spin bowling, and scored a century, his first test century overseas (all of his other test centuries to that point had come in England). Smith's most well-documented problems against spin, like many batsmen of his generation, came against Shane Warne who caused him significant problems in the 1993 Ashes.

He was one of England's most courageous players. Smith was targeted by the West Indies at Antigua in 1989–90 with fast short pitched bowling giving him no room for his favourite shots. During that innings, he was hit on the finger (subsequently diagnosed as broken) and hit flush on the jaw by a bouncer from Courtney Walsh – but neither blow forced him to retire hurt (although he did retire hurt in the second innings of the match).

Smith was part of England's Cricket World Cup squad in 1992. He scored 167 not out for England against Australia in the 1993 Texaco Trophy at Edgbaston, when Australia won by six wickets. This was the highest score made by an England batsman in an ODI (until Alex Hales scored 171 against Pakistan in 2016), and was the highest score made by any batsman who finished on the losing side in such a game (until Charles Coventry scored 194 against Bangladesh in a losing cause).

Although he had mixed fortunes in terms of individual performance in test matches against Australia, the fortunes of his team in those matches varied strikingly little: England did not win any of the 15 test matches in which he appeared against Australia.

=== Later career ===
Despite this, when Smith was dropped from the England team it was popularly perceived as premature, particularly given his Test batting average of over 43. Backing this up is the ICC's historical rankings of Test batsmen, which placed Smith as the 77th greatest batsman in history, and 17th greatest Englishman (ahead of others such as Alec Stewart and Mike Atherton).

In 1994, before Smith scored 175 in the fifth and final Test against the West Indies, he was accused by the then England coach Keith Fletcher of "having too many fingers in too many pies".

== Later life and death ==
After retiring from county cricket at the end of the 2003 season, Smith relocated to Australia to help run helmet manufacturer Masuri. After suffering from mental health problems and anxiety, he worked for his brother's clothing company and ran his own cricket coaching academy. In 2016, Smith was studying for a degree in psychological science at Swinburne University, Melbourne.

Smith died at his home in Perth, on 1 December 2025 at the age of 62. His death was announced by former teammate Kevan James.

Sporting positions
Preceded by John Stephenson	Hampshire cricket captains 1998–2002	Succeeded by John Crawley
