= Alan Igglesden =

English cricketer (1964–2021)

Personal information
- Full name: Alan Paul Igglesden
- Born: 8 October 1964; Farnborough, Kent, England
- Died: 1 November 2021 (aged 57); Apperley Bridge, West Yorkshire, England
- Batting: Right-handed
- Bowling: Right-arm fast-medium

International information
- National side: England (1989–1993/94)
- Test debut (cap 540): 24 August 1989 v Australia
- Last Test: 17 March 1994 v West Indies
- ODI debut (cap 123): 16 February 1994 v West Indies
- Last ODI: 5 March 1994 v West Indies

Domestic team information
- Years: Team
- 1986–1998: Kent
- 1987/88–1988/89: Western Province
- 1992/93: Boland
- 1999: Berkshire

Career statistics
Competition	Tests	ODIs	FC	LA
Matches	3	4	154	151
Runs scored	6	20	876	185
Batting average	3.00	10.00	8.34	10.27
100s/50s	0/0	0/0	0/0	0/0
Top score	3*	18	41	26*
Balls bowled	555	168	26,579	7,225
Wickets	6	2	503	190
Bowling average	54.83	61.00	26.81	24.60
5 wickets in innings	0	0	23	2
10 wickets in match	0	0	4	0
Best bowling	2/91	2/12	7/28	5/13
Catches/stumpings	1/–	1/–	40/–	29/–
- Source: CricInfo, 1 November 2021

Alan Paul Igglesden (8 October 1964 – 1 November 2021) was an English Test cricketer. He played three Test matches and four One Day Internationals (ODIs) for the England cricket team between 1989 and 1994 as a fast bowler. He played most of his first-class cricket career for Kent County Cricket Club, taking 592 wickets for the club.

== Cricket career ==
Igglesden was born in Farnborough, at that time part of Kent, in 1964. As a teenager, Igglesden played for his home town club, Westerham Cricket Club in Kent, and his pacey seam bowling was instrumental in the club retaining its North Kent League title in 1983. He first played for Kent County Cricket Club's Second XI in 1983 before making his first-class cricket debut for the county in July 1986 against Somerset at Maidstone. He went on to play for Kent until August 1998, making 283 appearances for the Kent First XI and taking 592 first-class and List A wickets. He took 50 first-class wickets in a season for Kent four times and recorded 19 five wicket hauls and two ten wicket matches for the county; in 1989 he took 90 wickets for Kent in 42 matches and was awarded his county cap. He played in South Africa for Western Province and Boland and finished his county career by appearing for Berkshire in the Minor Counties Championship in 1999.

Igglesden made his international debut for England in the final Test of the 1989 Ashes series. His elevation to Test cricketer owed much to a catalogue of injuries to other players and came in the wake of one of the rebel tours to South Africa which denied England the opportunity to pick players who had been involved with the tour. England manager, Micky Stewart, described Igglesden as being England's "seventeenth-choice" pace bowler. Igglesden took three wickets on his debut, and was the England A team's leading bowler on their tour of Zimbabwe in 1989/90, taking 5 for 33 in the third unofficial "Test". But he was then not picked again by England until 1993.

In 1993, Igglesden was picked for the first Test, again against Australia, and it appeared he may have had a few games to prove his worth. In the end, he did not play in a single Test that summer, courtesy of a groin injury and then a side strain. He did appear twice in Tests and in four ODIs against the West Indies in 1993/94, but took only three Test wickets and was not picked again.

== Later life ==
Igglesden suffered a seizure whilst playing for Berkshire in 1999 and, after a routine MRI scan, doctors discovered a non-malignant but inoperable brain tumour. He was treated with radiotherapy and drugs which initially led to a significant reduction in the size of the tumour.

After his retirement from cricket, he became a sports centre manager at Woodhouse Grove School. He has also taught at Sutton Valence School in Kent and later at Apperley Bridge in Yorkshire.

Igglesden was part of a charity supporting brain tumour sufferers, raising over £300,000 for The Brain Tumour Charity as well as fundraising for the Professional Cricketers' Trust. His brain tumour began to grow again in 2009, and Igglesden suffered two major strokes, the first in 2018. He died on 1 November 2021, at the age of 57.
