= Neil Foster =

English cricketer

Personal information
- Full name: Neil Alan Foster
- Born: 6 May 1962 (age 64); Colchester, Essex, England
- Nickname: Fozzy
- Height: 6 ft 4 in (1.93 m)
- Batting: Right-handed
- Bowling: Right-arm fast medium
- Role: Bowler

International information
- National side: England (1983–1993)
- Test debut (cap 502): 11 August 1983 v New Zealand
- Last Test: 17 June 1993 v Australia
- ODI debut (cap 71): 18 February 1984 v New Zealand
- Last ODI: 29 May 1989 v Australia

Domestic team information
- Years: Team
- 1980–1993: Essex
- 1991/92: Transvaal
- 1995: Norfolk

Career statistics
Competition	Test	ODI	FC	LA
Matches	29	48	230	215
Runs scored	446	150	4,343	1,247
Batting average	11.73	11.53	20.68	17.08
100s/50s	0/0	0/0	2/11	0/2
Top score	39	24	107*	62
Balls bowled	6,261	6261	45,833	10,954
Wickets	88	59	908	292
Bowling average	32.85	31.11	24.44	24.41
5 wickets in innings	5	0	50	2
10 wickets in match	1	0	8	0
Best bowling	8/107	3/20	8/99	5/17
Catches/stumpings	7/–	12/–	116/–	49/–
Medal record
Men's Cricket
Representing England
ICC Cricket World Cup
Runner-up	1987 India and Pakistan
- Source: CricInfo, 10 December 2008

Neil Alan Foster (born 6 May 1962) is an English former professional cricketer, who played 29 Test matches and 48 One Day Internationals for England from 1983 to 1993. Domestically Foster played for Essex County Cricket Club from 1980 to 1993, earning his county cap in 1983. He was a fast bowler. He was a part of the English squad which finished as runners-up at the 1987 Cricket World Cup.

== Early life and First Class cricket ==
Born 6 May 1962 at Colchester in Essex, Foster was educated at Philip Morant Comprehensive, Colchester. He played for Essex during their most successful period in their history. Supported by a star-studded team that included other England players such as Graham Gooch, Keith Fletcher, John Lever, Derek Pringle and later Nasser Hussain, Essex with Foster as their spearhead fast bowler won the County Championship on five occasions (1983, 1984, 1986, 1991 and 1992) during his time there. He took 97 first-class wickets at 21.24 in Essex's successful 1991 season, and in total took 908 first-class wickets. A useful tailend batter, he also made two first-class centuries. He also made his highest first-class score, 107 not out against Sussex, in 1991.

== Test cricket ==
Foster came to England's attention during Essex's County Championship campaign of 1983, featuring in an innings where they dismissed Surrey for only 14. He made his Test debut against New Zealand at Lord's in that year, with Jeremy Coney becoming his first wicket and only wicket of that game. Foster made his debut alongside other debutants, Nick Cook and Chris Smith, and it was the first time since 1959 that England had fielded three new players in a home Test.

Foster made his mark on Test cricket at a similar time to other fellow Essex players and captain Graham Gooch. Foster's fast swing bowling suited English conditions, but his best Test bowling figures in a match came against India in Madras in 1984–85 where he took eleven wickets in a match that England won on the way to a series victory. Indeed, he had a significantly better record as a Test bowler in Asia than elsewhere, taking 27 wickets in 6 Tests in India and Pakistan at an average of 22.96. Foster's best bowling figures in a Test innings were however the 8 for 107 he took against Pakistan at Leeds in 1987. England still lost that game heavily, and as of May 2022 Foster's innings figures remain the best taken in Test cricket in an innings defeat. Foster is also the only bowler to get both Javed Miandad (during that performance at Leeds) and Viv Richards out for a duck in a Test.

As a batsman, his highest Test score of 39 was made against Australia in the Fourth Test of the 1989 Ashes series. In 1988, Foster was selected as Wisden Cricketer of the Year alongside Jonathan Agnew, David Hughes, Peter Roebuck and Pakistan international Saleem Malik. Foster played in an era in which England generally struggled in Test cricket, and England only won three of his 29 Tests: his debut Test, that match in Madras, and a later match in 1988 against Sri Lanka.

== One-day international cricket ==
Foster played 48 one-day internationals for England, where he was more often on the winning side (England won 28 of these games). He represented them in the 1987 Cricket World Cup, playing in the final which England lost to Australia. Earlier in the tournament he shared a crucial stand with Allan Lamb and hit the winning runs as England secured an important unexpected victory against the West Indies. He played his last one-day international in the series against Australia at the start of the summer of 1989: England won this series on wickets lost, ahead of embarrassingly imploding in the following Test series, Foster taking 3 for 29 in England's only victory over Australia that summer.

== Rebel tour and retirement ==
During the 1989 Fourth Test, an England rebel tour to South Africa was announced, with Foster one of the touring party with Mike Gatting as captain. At the time Foster had been one of England's leading bowlers, taking more wickets than any other England bowler in the 1989 Ashes series in spite of only playing three Tests. All rebel players were banned for five years from Test cricket.

Foster got a recall from the selectors in 1993, replacing Phillip DeFreitas in the Second Ashes test. It was his first Test for four years. He became the fourth South African rebel to be rehabilitated, after Gatting, John Emburey and Paul Jarvis, and his selection was designed to bring more aggression to the English attack. But on a docile pitch at Foster's least favourite Test ground, his recall was not a success. Foster opened the bowling with Andy Caddick, and the Australians scored 632 for 4 declared. England lost by an innings and 62 runs. Foster played only one more county game before retiring that year.

== Injuries ==
"Back and knee injuries plagued the career of Essex seam bowler Neil Foster so much that the plates in his body once apparently set off an airport metal-detector. In all, he had as many as nine knee operations, and the problems jinxed a fine career.

Foster became a chartered physiotherapist after he retired from professional cricket. He gained his degree in physiotherapy from the University of Hertfordshire.
