= Texaco Trophy =

The Texaco Trophy was the name used for One Day International cricket tournaments held in England from 1984 until 1998.

The series were sponsored by American oil company Texaco replacing the previous sponsorship by the UK's Prudential (between 1972 and 1982). Depending on the number of teams touring England in a given season, there would typically be either one or two series each year, involving the home side and each visiting side. The series usually consisted of three matches, but varied in length between one and five matches.

== Series by year ==
Year	Teams	Matches	Result	Notes
1984	England vs West Indies	3	1–2	
1985	England vs Australia	3	1–2	
1986	England vs India	2	1–1	India awarded series on scoring rate
1986	England vs New Zealand	2	1–1	New Zealand awarded series on scoring rate
1987	England vs Pakistan	3	2–1	
1988	England vs West Indies	3	3–0	
1988	England vs Sri Lanka	1	1–0	
1989	England vs Australia	3	1–1	England awarded series on fewest wickets lost
1990	England vs New Zealand	2	1–1	England awarded series on scoring rate
1990	England vs India	2	0–2	
1991	England vs West Indies	3	3–0	
1992	England vs Pakistan	5	4–1	
1993	England vs Australia	3	0–3	
1994	England vs New Zealand	2	1–0	
1994	England vs South Africa	2	2–0	
1995	England vs West Indies	3	2–1	
1996	England vs India	3	2–0	
1996	England vs Pakistan	3	2–1	
1997	England vs Australia	3	3–0	
1998	England vs South Africa	3	1–2	

== Notable matches ==
In a 1984 match at Old Trafford between England and the West Indies, Vivian Richards scored 189 not out, then the world-record score for a limited-overs international match.

In the second match of the 1993 series against Australia, Robin Smith scored 167 not out, which remained the record score by any England batsman in One Day Internationals until August 2016, when Alex Hales scored 171 against Pakistan at Trent Bridge. England, however, went on to lose the match.

The second match of the 1989 series at Trent Bridge, was a tie with both England and Australia scoring 226 from 55 overs. With the other two matches in the 3-match series split 1–1, England were awarded the series by virtue of having lost fewer wickets in the tied match (they also had a superior overall run-rate.)

== Replacement series ==
- Emirates Triangular (1998)
- NatWest Series (2000–present)
