= Derek Pringle =

English cricketer (born 1958)

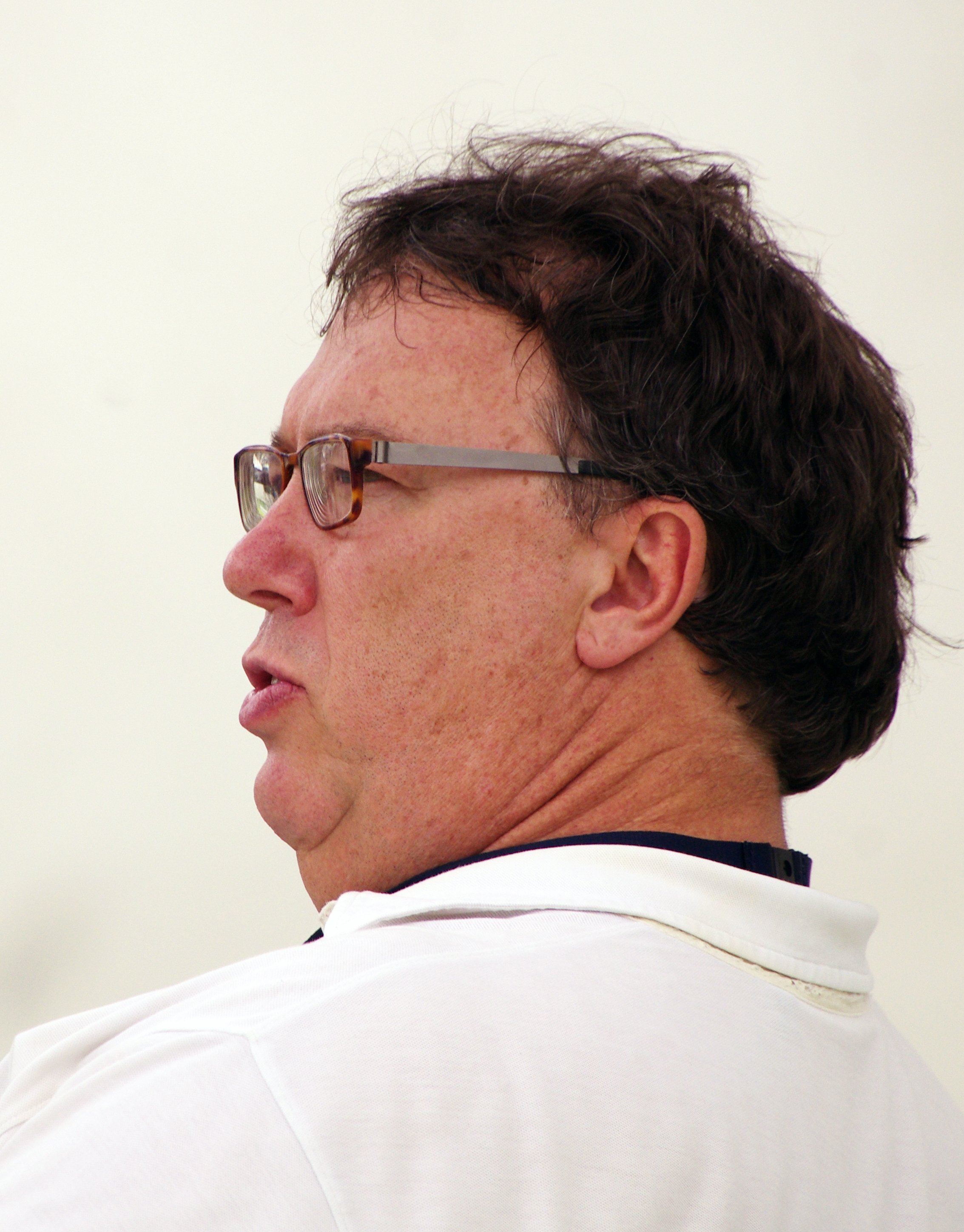
- Derek Pringle (2014)

Personal information
- Full name: Derek Raymond Pringle
- Born: 18 September 1958 (age 68); Nairobi, Kenya
- Height: 195 cm (6 ft 5 in)
- Batting: Right-handed
- Bowling: Right-arm medium
- Role: All rounder
- Relatives: Donald Pringle (father)

International information
- National side: England
- Test debut: 10 June 1982 v India
- Last Test: 6 August 1992 v Pakistan
- ODI debut: 17 July 1982 v Pakistan
- Last ODI: 21 May 1993 v Australia

Domestic team information
- Years: Team
- 1978–1993: Essex
- 1979–1982: Cambridge University

Career statistics
Competition	Test	ODI	FC	LA
Matches	30	44	295	317
Runs scored	695	425	9,243	4,873
Batting average	15.10	23.61	28.26	25.92
100s/50s	0/1	0/0	10/48	0/29
Top score	63	49*	128	81*
Balls bowled	5,287	2,379	45,139	15,410
Wickets	70	44	761	383
Bowling average	35.97	38.11	26.58	27.14
5 wickets in innings	3	0	25	5
10 wickets in match	0	0	3	0
Best bowling	5/95	4/42	7/18	5/12
Catches/stumpings	10/–	11/–	154/–	87/–
Medal record
Men's Cricket
Representing England
ICC Cricket World Cup
Runner-up	1987 India and Pakistan
Runner-up	1992 Australia and New Zealand
- Source: CricketArchive, 7 September 2008

Derek Raymond Pringle (born 18 September 1958) is a Kenyan-born English former Test and One Day International cricketer for England, and is now a cricket journalist. He was a part of the English squads which finished as runners-up at the 1987 Cricket World Cup and as runners-up at the 1992 Cricket World Cup.

== Life and career ==
Pringle was born in Nairobi, Kenya. His father Donald Pringle, who had moved there to work as a landscaper, played cricket for Kenya and represented East Africa at the 1975 Cricket World Cup; he died in a car accident a few months later, days after his son's 17th birthday.

Pringle was educated at St. Mary's School (Nairobi), Felsted School and Fitzwilliam College, Cambridge. He played for Essex between 1978 and 1993. He was a member of the successful Essex sides of the 1980s and early 1990s, alongside cricketers such as Graham Gooch, Mark Waugh, Nasser Hussain, John Lever and Neil Foster, which in that period won the County Championship six times. As an undergraduate, Pringle played for Cambridge University. In 1982, while captain of the university, he was selected for England Pringle went on to play 30 Tests, the last of which was in 1992, scoring 695 runs and taking 70 wickets. He also played in 44 One-Day Internationals between 1982 and 1993. He appeared in two World Cups and was a member of England's 1992 World Cup Final team. He has published his memoir/autobiography 'Pushing the Boundaries - Cricket in the 80s' in November 2018.

=== International career ===
Pringle's career can probably be best summed up in phases.

Phase 1 – Early days in Botham's shadow Picked for the first time in 1982, he played several Test matches that summer with Ian Botham in the same side but averaged just 11 with the bat and 40 with the ball. The selectors felt that faster bowling was more likely to trouble the 1982 tourists (India and Pakistan) than spin. Pringle toured Australia in 1982–83 but failed to hold his place in 1983.

Pringle was recalled to the England team for the start of 1984, but was powerless to prevent a series of Test defeats by the all-conquering touring West Indies cricket team. He did however take his first Test five-wicket haul in the first Test match at Birmingham, and could claim to be the only English player to be man of the match in a victory over the West Indies that summer, in the second one-day international at Nottingham.

Phase 2 – England's all-rounder By the summer of 1986, Botham had been banned for three months for smoking cannabis. Pringle was therefore elevated to fulfil Botham's role. 1986 was probably one of the worst years for English Test cricket. Pringle played in the first three-match series of the summer, bowling adequately but having his batting exposed by the Indian spin attack, particularly Maninder Singh. He did however make his only Test half-century (an innings of 63) in the first match of this series at Lord's, adding 147 in a partnership with Graham Gooch.

With Botham returning for the last Test of the year at the Oval, Pringle was dropped and did not make the 1986–87 Australian tour. He did not return to the side until the following winter's tour to India and Pakistan for the 1987 World Cup, as Botham had decided not to tour. Pringle's style of bowling proved to be unsuccessful on dead Asian pitches; he went for 83 runs against West Indies in Gujranwala. Although he played the next two games, against Pakistan and Sri Lanka, he was then dropped for the rest of the tournament.

By the turn of the year he had lost his place to another aspiring all-rounder, David Capel from Northampton, who played in the Bicentenary Test in Sydney as well as the Test series in New Zealand. Again recalled for the home series against West Indies in 1988, Pringle took immediate action by taking five wickets in the Texaco Trophy series and making a crucial 39 in the second game at Headingley, which proved to be the difference between the two teams. Again Pringle was man of the match. Arguably that game was his highest point for England.

Pringle again bowled adequately in the first two Tests (Ian Botham being out for the season after his back operation) but, batting at number six, was exposed against the firepower of the West Indies pace attack. David Capel replaced him for Manchester, but a poor performance from Capel saw Pringle recalled again for Headingley where he took five wickets (his best Test figures, 5/95). He took three more at the Oval in the fifth Test, and briefly captained the team from the evening of the third day after Graham Gooch sustained a serious finger injury attempting to take a catch at first slip from Desmond Haynes. England went on to lose the game.

The "in-out" nature of Pringle's selection continued again in 1989. Botham and Pringle played together in the Texaco Trophy, but Botham sustained a facial injury facing Glamorgan bowler Steve Barwick. On a very flat pitch at Headingley, Pringle was one of four bowlers put to the sword by the Australian batsmen. He was dropped until the final Test of the series at the Oval, where he took four wickets in the Australian first innings and was England's most successful bowler. For the following winter tour to the West Indies David Capel was named as all rounder, and Chris Lewis, initially called into the squad as a replacement for Ricardo Ellcock, thereafter became England's new all-rounder in Test matches, although Pringle occasionally continued to turn out in one-day internationals.

Phase 3 – "Pring the swing" As so often happened around this time, England's youth policy was not long-lasting; Pringle was back in the England team by the beginning of the 1991 season, again against the West Indies. In the interim he had made a clear change to his bowling style, slightly slowing down and swinging the ball. In this new style he proved highly effective throughout that series. On a lively Headingley pitch, his style took wickets and proved hard to score against, and he shared in a crucial second-innings partnership of 98 for the seventh wicket with his captain Graham Gooch (Pringle's share being 27), helping England to their first victory in a home Test match against the West Indies for 22 years. He also took five wickets in the first innings at Lord's, giving him an unusual hat-trick of three five-wicket hauls in Test match cricket against the West Indies, one coming on each of three successive West Indies tours of England. Pringle also shared in a ninth-wicket partnership of 92 with Chris Lewis in the second innings at Birmingham; however this was his team's largest partnership of the match and this time Pringle finished on the losing side. Pringle was forced to withdraw with tonsillitis from the final Test of the series, which England won, meaning that his replacement Botham finally had the experience Pringle had enjoyed earlier in the summer of being on the winning side in a Test match against the West Indies.

For the following winter tour of 1991–92, Pringle bowled tightly in the Test Series in New Zealand and was a star in the following World Cup. Opening the bowling in every game, he produced tidy figures in every match, particularly in the World Cup Final in which England were beaten by Pakistan. His figures of 3/22 remain (as of 2022) the best bowling figures ever taken by an England male player in a List A cricket World Cup final.

The English home season of 1992 saw Pringle take his best one-day international figures, 4/42, also against Pakistan in an England victory at Lord's. In the subsequent Test series, Botham and Pringle initially played together in the Test side, but neither lasted long. Botham played his last Test at Lord's, and Pringle was dropped until the Headingley Test match. Headingley was the ground where he took more of his Test wickets than any other, and again, Pringle was instrumental in England's win versus Pakistan, and the selectors persisted with him for the Oval. By this stage he was beginning to be easier to play on flat pitches but an excellent opponent when there was anything in the pitch. On a very true, fast, bouncy surface at the Oval, Pringle looked highly playable, and his final bow on a Test match field saw him having his off stump flattened by Wasim Akram. He was not chosen to tour India in 1992–93, but did make the Texaco Trophy side for 1993 against Australia. Failing to make the Test side, he retired shortly afterwards.

=== Career after and outside cricket ===
Pringle eventually became a cult figure late in his career. His always popular warm-up routine before coming on to bowl involved him lying on his back and apparently wrestling with an invisible octopus. He once damaged his back when his chair collapsed, forcing him to withdraw from a Test match, although the story usually (but wrongly) told is that he sustained the injury whilst writing a letter.

After his playing days he became a cricket correspondent, firstly with The Independent and then The Daily Telegraph. In 2004 Pringle was threatened with deportation by the Mugabe administration in Zimbabwe during an England cricket tour of the country.

He has eclectic tastes in fashion and music in comparison to his former team-mates. Pringle's interests include archaeology, photography, writing, real ale, and more obscure musical trends. He picked a track, (The Soft Boys with "I Wanna Destroy You"), for Rough Trade Records' 30th anniversary compilation album.

Pringle also appeared as an extra in the film Chariots of Fire.

He was a Technical Advisor to the Oman cricket team in 2015, helping them qualify for their first ever World T20 Tournament the following year.

== See also ==
- List of Test cricketers born in non-Test playing nations
