= Paul Jarvis =

English cricketer

Personal information
- Full name: Paul William Jarvis
- Born: 29 June 1965 (age 61); Redcar, Yorkshire, England
- Batting: Right-handed
- Bowling: Right-arm fast-medium

Career statistics
Competition	Test	ODI
Matches	9	16
Runs scored	132	31
Batting average	10.15	5.16
100s/50s	0/0	0/0
Top score	29*	16*
Balls bowled	1,912	879
Wickets	21	24
Bowling average	45.95	28.00
5 wickets in innings	0	1
10 wickets in match	0	0
Best bowling	4/107	5/35
Catches/stumpings	2/–	1/–
- Source: , 1 January 2006

Paul William Jarvis (born 29 June 1965) is an English former cricketer, who played in nine Tests and sixteen ODIs for England from 1988 to 1993.

Cricket writer Colin Bateman remarked: "Jarvis always had much potential as a well-coordinated pace bowler who skiddied the ball through with considerable venom".

Jarvis retired from the game in 2000, and worked in a firm which helps current players find agent representation. In 2009, he was appointed Director of Cricket at Framlingham College in Suffolk. He coached the England Ladies cricket team in 2011. He now owns his own boutique hotel and coffee shop in Wiltshire.

== Domestic career ==
A right-arm skiddy quick bowler and tail-end right-handed batsman, Jarvis made his Yorkshire debut at the age of 16 years and 75 days – at that time the youngest player ever to represent his county – and was tipped for Test stardom, but he failed to establish himself as a permanent member of the England team. He played for Yorkshire from 1981 to 1993, winning his first team cap in 1986, after taking 11 for 92 against Middlesex. He was the youngest player to take a hat-trick in the Sunday League in 1982 and in the County Championship in 1985, but as Yorkshire tired of his constant injury problems, he was released to play for Sussex from 1994 to 1998. He had 51 victims in 1994 in his first season there, winning his second county cap, but was again plagued by injury thereafter. His experiences at Somerset from 1999 to 2002 were similar, but he could still be a potent force in one-day cricket on his day, as he proved by taking 5 for 55 in the 1999 NatWest Trophy final against Gloucestershire. He played for Wellington in New Zealand in the 1996/97 season, and spent several winters playing club cricket variously in Australia, New Zealand and South Africa.

In 215 first-class matches he took 654 wickets, with a best of 7–55, at an average of 28.92, and scored 3,373 runs at 16.78, with a best score of 80 for Yorkshire against Northants in 1992. He played in four youth Test matches for England in 1982 and 1983. His career was hampered by a succession of injuries to his slender 5' 10" frame, but his whippy athletic bowling won him 81 wickets in 1987, and his match-winning 4 for 43 in the final of the Benson and Hedges Cup helped win him selection on England's winter tour of Pakistan, New Zealand and Australia.

== International career ==
His Test debut came in Lancaster Park in Christchurch against New Zealand, but although he took six wickets in his first two matches on sluggish pitches, he was dropped for the final test. He returned against the strong West Indies team in the home series of 1988, recording his Test best figures with both ball and bat, with 4 for 107 and scoring 29 not out, at Lord's. A back injury forced him out of the series, and he was out of Test cricket for a year before returning against Australia for two tests in the calamitous 1989 Ashes series. After only one wicket (which was a "drag on" to the stumps, Geoff Marsh being the unfortunate batsman) at Edgbaston, he was dropped once more and chose to go on the 1989/90 rebel tour of South Africa, which saw him banned for three years from the England Test team. When asked why he went on the tour, Jarvis replied: "to pay off my mortgage in one go".

The rebel ban was lifted after South Africa's return to Test cricket, and Jarvis was chosen to tour India and Sri Lanka in 1992–93. He bowled with good pace, and took four wickets in two Tests in a losing cause, as well as securing the man of the match award for taking 5 for 35 against India in Bangalore. He was dropped for the final Test against India; returned to take 3 for 76 against Sri Lanka in Colombo; then never played Test cricket again.

While Jarvis's decision to tour South Africa (announced on the final day of the Old Trafford Test against Australia in 1989) was widely seen at the time as a disaster for English fast bowling strength, his Test career up to that point indicated that he was by no means certain of a place in the team—more through selectorial whim than his own performance. His fledgling Test career had come up against some strong opposition (West Indies and Australia) and he did not have chance to "fill his boots" (as others did) against weaker opposition.
