= Greg Campbell (cricketer) =

Australian cricketer (born 1964)

Personal information
- Full name: Gregory Dale Campbell
- Born: 10 March 1964 (age 62); Launceston, Tasmania, Australia
- Height: 175 cm (5 ft 9 in)
- Batting: Right-handed
- Bowling: Right-arm fast-medium
- Role: Bowler

International information
- National side: Australia (1989–1990)
- Test debut (cap 347): 8 June 1989 v England
- Last Test: 15 March 1990 v New Zealand
- ODI debut (cap 106): 26 December 1989 v Sri Lanka
- Last ODI: 30 April 1990 v Bangladesh

Domestic team information
- Years: Team
- 1986/87–1991/92: Tasmania

Career statistics
Competition	Test	ODI	FC	LA
Matches	4	12	44	25
Runs scored	10	6	347	23
Batting average	2.50	3.00	8.46	3.83
100s/50s	0/0	0/0	0/0	0/0
Top score	6	4*	41	7
Balls bowled	951	613	8,385	1,292
Wickets	13	18	120	28
Bowling average	38.69	22.44	33.46	29.64
5 wickets in innings	0	0	5	0
10 wickets in match	0	0	0	0
Best bowling	3/79	3/17	6/80	3/17
Catches/stumpings	1/–	4/–	10/–	4/–
- Source: ESPNCricinfo, 12 December 2005

Gregory Dale Campbell (born 10 March 1964) is a former Australian cricketer who played in four Test matches and 12 One Day Internationals in 1989 and 1990. Campbell was a right arm fast bowler, and batted as a right-handed tail ender. He is the uncle of former Australian captain Ricky Ponting. Campbell's sister, Lorraine, is married to Graeme Ponting, and Ricky Ponting is their first child.

Campbell made his debut in the Sheffield Shield for Tasmania in the 1986–87 season, playing just one match for the season, before missing all of the matches in the following season. However, in the 1988–89 season, Campbell gained attention when he took 36 wickets for the season, giving him selection on the 1989 Ashes tour against England. Due to injuries hitting other bowlers, Campbell made his Test debut in the First Test at Headingley in place of Carl Rackemann. However, he was dropped from the Test team for the remainder of the tour due to his lack of performance in that Test, taking 1/124. He took 30 wickets in the tour games at an average of 27.

On his return to Australia, he had another good domestic season in 1989–90, taking 35 wickets, and earning him sporadic Test appearances, playing a Test each against Sri Lanka, Pakistan and New Zealand. He claimed 12 Test wickets in those matches at an average of 31.58. He achieved his best match figures with 5/143 against Sri Lanka at Bellerive Oval, his home ground, as well as an innings best of 3/79 against Pakistan at the Adelaide Oval. He had little batting ability, as evidenced by his average.

Campbell was also selected to the ODI team in the 1989/90 season, making his debut against Sri Lanka at the Melbourne Cricket Ground in the first match of the triangular ODI tournament. After taking 0/36 on debut, he was expensive in the following match at the WACA Ground, conceding 54 runs, and was dropped. He was recalled for the final two matches against Sri Lanka and Pakistan respectively, taking much better figures of 3/31 and 2/46 at the Adelaide Oval and Sydney Cricket Ground to ensure selection for the finals series. He performed well again in the finals, with 3/39 and 1/21 to help Australia win the series 2–0. This established him in the ODI team, playing in all group matches in the following triangular tournament in New Zealand. He took his career best of 3/17 against New Zealand at Jade Stadium, Christchurch, before another haul of 3/37 in the final at Eden Park, Auckland helped Australia to another victory.

However knee and wrist injuries hindered him in the next two seasons, and then a serious back injury led to Tasmania releasing him. He moved to Queensland in 1992–93 but was unable to secure a place in their side. He is currently the chief executive officer of Cricket PNG, based in Port Moresby, Papua New Guinea.
