= Nigel Plews =

English cricket umpire

Nigel Trevor Plews (5 September 1934 – 19 October 2008) was a cricket umpire from England, who stood in first-class and international level matches. He was born in Nottingham.

Plews was unusual for a top-level English umpire, in that he was one of only four umpires who have stood in Tests in England since World War II who did not play first-class cricket. He stood in 11 Test matches between 1988 and 1995.

He took up umpiring full-time after retiring from a 25-year career with the Nottingham city police force, where he was a detective sergeant – he was nicknamed "Serge" on the field – in the Fraud Squad.

He also stood in 16 One Day International matches and officiated at 11 Tests before retiring. Plews died of renal cancer on 19 October 2008.

== See also ==
- List of Test cricket umpires
- List of One Day International cricket umpires
