= 1986–87 Ashes =

1986–87 Ashes series
- Part of English cricket team in Australia in 1986–87
- Date: 14 November 1986 – 15 January 1987
- Location: Australia
- Result: England won the five-match series 2–1
- Player of the series: Chris Broad (Eng)
Teams
- Australia: England
Captains
- Allan Border: Mike Gatting
Most runs
- Dean Jones (511) Allan Border (473) Geoff Marsh (429): Chris Broad (487); David Gower (404); Mike Gatting (393)
Most wickets
- Bruce Reid (20) Peter Sleep (10) Steve Waugh (10) Merv Hughes (10): John Emburey (18); Graham Dilley (16); Phil Edmonds (15)

The 1986–87 Ashes series was a series of five Test cricket matches that were contested between England and Australia for The Ashes. The series was played at five venues across Australia, starting on 14 November 1986 in Brisbane and concluding on 15 January 1987 in Sydney. England were the defending holders of the Ashes going into the series, having reclaimed the urn in 1985.

England, under the leadership of Mike Gatting, successfully retained the Ashes after winning the Boxing Day Test match in Melbourne.

== Venues ==
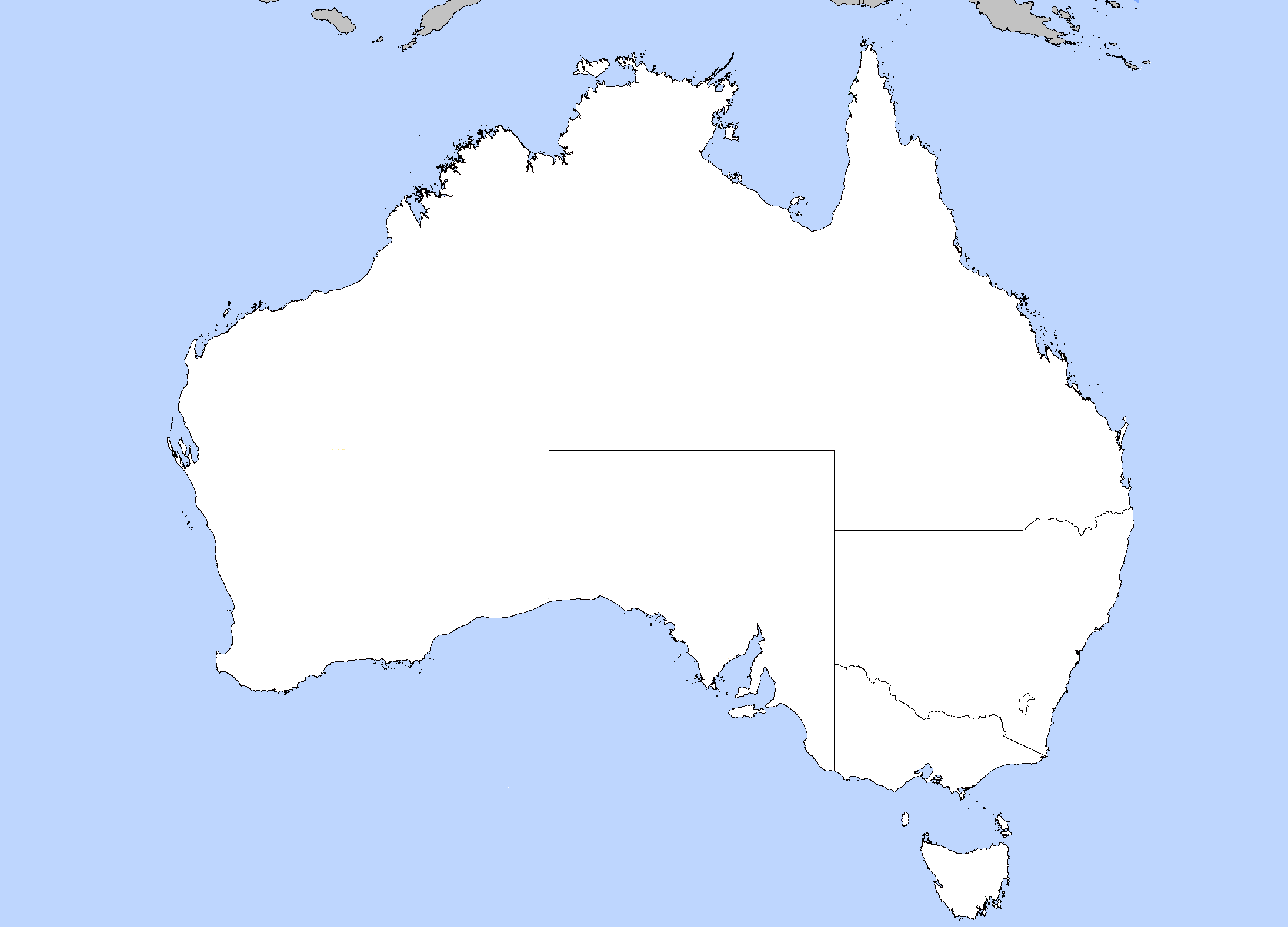

The ordering of the venues was slightly different to the previous Australian Ashes series, with a swap between Perth and Brisbane.

== Lead-up to Test series ==
England played warm-up matches against Queensland, South Australia and Western Australia. They lost to Queensland by 5 wickets, beat South Australia by 5 wickets, and drew against Western Australia, but would almost certainly would have lost without rain intervention. One noticeable trend was the susceptibility of the England batsmen against left-arm pace - a vulnerability which came back to haunt them in the later tour match against New South Wales between the 1st and 2nd Tests, in which another left-arm pacer Mike Whitney also took a five-for.

When the Australian squad for the First Test was announced, it included two left-arm pace bowlers - Bruce Reid and Chris Matthews, both representing Western Australia. Earning a recall were Victorian paceman Merv Hughes and NSW quick Geoff Lawson, who had been sidelined for nearly a year with back problems. Besides the captain Allan Border (Queensland), other players selected in the squad had been part of the recently concluded tour to India: NSW all-rounders Greg Matthews and Steve Waugh, Queensland batsman Greg Ritchie, Tasmanian batsman David Boon, Victorian batsman Dean Jones, Western Australian opener Geoff Marsh and wicketkeeper Tim Zoehrer. Boon usually batted at 3 or 4 for Tasmania, but had been opening the batting for Australia for just over a year by now, with centuries home and away against India despite being out of position, so he was designated to continue what had become a reliable opening partnership with Marsh.

== Test series ==
=== 1st Test ===
14–19 November 1986
Scorecard

England	v	Australia
456 (134 overs); IT Botham 138 (174); SR Waugh 3/76 (21 overs)		248 (104.4 overs); GRJ Matthews 56* (115); GR Dilley 5/68 (25.4 overs)
3/77 (22.3 overs); BC Broad 35* (82); MG Hughes 2/28 (5.3 overs)		282 (f/o) (116.5 overs); GR Marsh 110 (311); JE Emburey 5/80 (42.5 overs)

England won by 7 wickets
The Gabba, Brisbane
Umpires: AR Crafter (Aus) and MW Johnson (Aus)
Player of the match: IT Botham (Eng)

- Australia won the toss and elected to field.
- 17 November was taken as a rest day.
- Chris Matthews (Aus), Phillip DeFreitas and Jack Richards (Eng) made their Test debuts.
- Ian Botham (Eng) scored his 14th (and final) Test century.
- Graham Dilley (Eng) took his first five-wicket haul in Tests in Australia's first innings.
- Geoff Marsh (Aus) scored his third Test century.
- John Emburey (Eng) took his fifth five-wicket haul in Tests in Australia's second innings and reached 100 Test wickets.

England's achievement in winning this match, especially against the backdrop of their early tour form, surprised many observers, one of the visiting journalists famously observing that Mike Gatting's side had only three major problems: "They can't bat, they can't bowl, and they can't field". For Australia, with such high hopes against the "old enemy", the loss was depressing and indicated yet again that Australia's young side still had a long way to go before they could be competitive.

==== Day one ====
Before the start of play it was announced that Geoff Lawson would be Australia's 12th man, leaving the hosts with one of their most inexperienced pace attacks in many years; Chris Matthews was making his Test debut while Merv Hughes and Bruce Reid had only played 9 Tests between them. Allan Border won his sixth successive toss and opted to field, hoping the grassy pitch and muggy conditions would assist his bowlers.

Bill Athey and Chris Broad negotiated the first half-hour, scoring 15 runs for the opening stand before Reid had Broad caught behind with some extra bounce for 8. England captain Mike Gatting came in next, promoting himself up the order to shield the out-of-form David Gower from having to bat too early in the innings. In just over two hours of play, Gatting and Athey added 101 to England's total, with Gatting's innings of 61 containing 11 fours. He was just starting to accelerate his scoring rate when he was bowled off his pads by an inswinger from Hughes.

When play ended shortly after tea due to rain and bad light, England's score was 198 for 2 - Athey had anchored the innings with a chancy but hard-fought 76 while Allan Lamb was on 40.

==== Day two ====
The second day's play belonged to England's brilliant all-rounder Ian Botham. Australia again started the day promisingly, removing Lamb first ball and then Athey three overs later without any addition to the overnight score. Gower, still fresh at the crease and yet to score, offered a sharp chance that was dropped by C. Matthews at third slip off Hughes, which in hindsight proved to be turning point of the match. Botham promptly took charge and batted with uncharacteristic restraint, giving Gower much-needed space to settle into the innings and rediscover his form. The pair took England's score past 300 before Gower fell for 51.

Richards and Emburey departed cheaply before Phil DeFreitas combined with Botham in a 92-run partnership to push England's score past 400. In the over that Botham reached his hundred, he took 22 runs off Hughes. By the time he was dismissed on 138, with Hughes sprinting in to catch him at long leg off Steve Waugh, England were just shy of 450. Botham had batted for 249 minutes and hit 17 boundaries - 13 fours and four sixes.

Australia started their first innings with just over an hour of the day's play remaining. Geoff Marsh and David Boon combined for an opening stand of 27 before Boon departed for 10, hooking a catch to Broad off DeFreitas. Wicketkeeper Tim Zoehrer was sent in as nightwatchman before play was ended with Australia's score at 33 for 1.

==== Day three ====
Marsh and Zoehrer navigated the first hour of play with little trouble, adding over 60 runs to Australia's score before Zoehrer was adjudged lbw to Graham Dilley for 38. Dean Jones struggled to get going and was trapped in front by DeFreitas for 8. Marsh reached his half-century and had batted well for nearly three-and-a-half hours before he slashed at a wide delivery from Dilley and was caught behind by Richards.

Surprisingly, Border, batting on his home deck, also struggled against the England bowling attack, eking out seven runs before charging Phil Edmonds and mishitting a catch to DeFreitas at backward point. The two Gregs - Ritchie and Matthews - worked hard to ensure no further wickets were lost, Australia's score reading 188 for 5 at the tea break.

England took the new ball as soon as it became available shortly after play resumed, and in his first over with it Dilley struck, getting Ritchie caught by Edmonds fielding at gully, then in his next over removing Waugh caught behind for a duck. Australia were now in a precarious position at 204 for 7, still over 50 runs away from avoiding the follow-on with the tail exposed. The two Matthews - Greg and Chris - managed to add 35 runs before Botham removed C. Matthews and Hughes in quick succession, and then Dilley sealed Australia's fate by claiming Reid's scalp with the score on 248. With the rest day looming, Gatting had no hesitation in enforcing the follow-on. Australia survived one over, still trailing England's first innings by 207 runs.

To further compound Australia's humiliation, 12th man Lawson had injured his right ankle during the day, falling awkwardly after trying to hurdle the Gabba fence.

==== Day four ====
England achieved an early breakthrough when Boon again departed for a low score, trapped in front by Botham for 14. Jones joined Marsh at the crease and demonstrated keen attacking intent, scoring 18 at nearly a run a minute before he advanced too far down the wicket to John Emburey and stranded himself. Emburey's patience and craft also wore down Border who on 23, pushed forward with bat and pad and lobbed a simple catch to Lamb at silly mid-off. Ritchie showed willingness to occupy time and combined with Marsh for a 113-run fourth-wicket stand, the highlight of his innings being a towering six into the Clem Jones Stand, before falling lbw to DeFreitas for 45.

Off his first ball, Greg Matthews scored a boundary to put Australia ahead before Marsh reached a well-deserved century, his third in ten Tests and his first in Australia. With 15 minutes remaining, Dilley claimed the important wicket of Matthews, squaring up the batsman with an awkward delivery and taking a return catch off the leading edge. Waugh avoided a pair and safely negotiated the tricky final few minutes with Marsh to take Australia's score to 243 for 5 at stumps, having edged ahead by 35 runs. Marsh, who finished the day unbeaten on 108, had spent over seven hours at the crease and hit 12 fours.

==== Day five ====
England began the final day's play knowing if Marsh could be removed early, Australia's chances of winning, let alone escaping with a draw, would be all but lost. After half an hour England achieved the desired breakthrough when Marsh, attempting an off-drive off DeFreitas, inside-edged the ball onto the stumps, ending a fine innings of 110. Waugh followed soon after, misjudging a well-flighted delivery by Emburey and yorking himself, and handing the England vice-captain his 100th Test wicket. Emburey, who was making good use of the strong breeze blowing across the ground, made short work of the tail. He finished the innings with bowling figures of 5 for 80 having also conceded fewer than 2 runs per over. England was left with 75 runs to win and, despite losing three wickets along the way, achieved a well-deserved victory shortly after the lunch break. It was England's first Test win of the year, and only the third time they had won in Brisbane.

=== 2nd Test ===
28 November–3 December 1986
Scorecard

England	v	Australia
8/592d (170.1 overs); Chris Broad 162 (313); Bruce Reid 4/115 (40 overs)		401 (134.4 overs); Allan Border 125 (282); Graham Dilley 4/79 (24.4 overs)
8/199d (53.3 overs); Mike Gatting 70 (129); Steve Waugh 5/69 (21.3 overs)		4/197 (97 overs); Dean Jones 69 (157); Phil Edmonds 1/25 (27 overs)

Match drawn
WACA Ground, Perth
Umpires: RA French (Aus) and PJ McConnell (Aus)
Player of the match: BC Broad (Eng)

- England won the toss and elected to bat.
- 1 December was taken as a rest day.

England were unchanged from the 1st Test, whereas Australia made a change to their fast bowling attack: Lawson, who had been 12th man at Brisbane, replaced Hughes in the team.

England again batted first and racked up a large total, Chris Broad and Jack Richards both making maiden test centuries and Bill Athey falling only four runs short. David Gower also made a hundred. But this time Australia did manage to avoid the follow-on, narrowly, largely thanks to a century from Allan Border and 71 from Steve Waugh, batting as nightwatchman (at this stage of his career he was considered an all-rounded who batted in the late middle order, not the top-order batsman he subsequently became.) Batting became more difficult in the second innings, England crashing to 199/8 declared (Waugh taking 5/69), but the target of 391 runs on the last day was too great for Australia to consider chasing - especially after losing Boon to the first ball of the day. Australia lost three more wickets, but although scoring was slow, all the other batsmen proved durable, and the game petered out into a draw - but not before England had lost Ian Botham from the bowling attack, with a torn side muscle. As of 2025 this is the last occasion on which England avoided defeat in a Test match at Perth.

=== 3rd Test ===
12–16 December 1986
(5–day match)
Scorecard

Australia	v	England
514/5d (171 overs); David Boon 103 (274); Phil Edmonds 2/134 (52 overs)		455 (148.4 overs); Chris Broad 116 (263); Bruce Reid 4/64 (28.4 overs)
201/3d (90 overs); Allan Border 100* (253); Phillip DeFreitas 1/36 (16 overs)		39/2 (23 overs); Chris Broad 15* (69); Greg Matthews 1/10 (8 overs)

Match drawn
Adelaide Oval, Adelaide
Umpires: Tony Crafter and Steve Randell
Player of the match: Allan Border (AUS)

- Australia won the toss and elected to bat.
- GC Dyer (AUS) and JJ Whitaker (ENG) made their Test debuts.

The injury to Botham forced a change to the England line-up: he was replaced by James Whitaker, a specialist batsman. Australia, meanwhile, made three changes. Zoehrer was injured, and replaced by Greg Dyer behind the stumps: and a double change to the bowling attack saw Hughes return in place of Lawson, who had been ineffective at Perth, and leg-spinner Peter Sleep replacing fast bowler Chris Matthews.

The absence of Botham affected England more than the absence of Tim Zoehrer affected Australia - not least because the all-rounder's replacement by a specialist batsman in the team had left the team with only four bowlers, including only two seamers, Gatting resorting to bowling his occasional medium pace as fifth bowler: and this time Australia seized the advantage, the whole top order supporting David Boon's hundred. However hundreds from Broad and Gatting, lost time and a relatively tame pitch (on which Border scored another century, in Australia's second innings) ensured another draw. With England 1-0 up, holding the Ashes and two tests to play, Australia left Adelaide needing to win both remaining Tests to reclaim the Ashes.

=== 4th Test ===
26–28 December 1986
(5–day match)
Scorecard

Australia	v	England
141 (54.4 overs); Dean Jones 59 (136); Ian Botham 5/41 (16 overs)		349 (120.5 overs); Chris Broad 112 (255); Bruce Reid 4/78 (28 overs)
194 (73.4 overs); Geoff Marsh 60 (142); Phil Edmonds 3/45 (19.4 overs)

England won by an innings and 14 runs
Melbourne Cricket Ground, Melbourne
Umpires: AR Crafter and RA French
Player of the match: GC Small (ENG)

- England won the toss and elected to field.
- The match was scheduled for five days but completed in three.

For England, Botham was declared fit to play, although not bowling at his usual pace, and thus he reclaimed his place in the team from Whitaker. Graham Dilley sustained an injury and was replaced by Gladstone Small. Australia, meanwhile, restored Zoehrer in place of Dyer, retained Hughes and Reid from the bowling attack, but dropped batsman Greg Ritchie (consistent but unspectacular with the bat - no dismissals for under 30 but no scores over 46) for another bowler, Craig McDermott.

Australia, in losing this match, marked their 14th Test in succession without a victory. By any statistical analysis, Australia had reached their all-time historic "low" when the match ended. Australia's first innings saw three English five-fors before tea on the first day - five wickets each for Small and Botham (who also picked up three catches), and five catches for Richards behind the stump, England subsequently passing Australia's total early on the second day with only one wicket down. Chris Broad became the third English batsman, after Jack Hobbs and Wally Hammond, to score hundreds in three consecutive Ashes Tests, after which Australia collapsed a second time to lose by an innings. Allan Border later criticised the Australian selectors for picking a team with only four specialist batsmen – Border said he wanted to pick Greg Ritchie but was overruled.

=== 5th Test ===
10–15 January 1987
(5–day match)
Scorecard

Australia	v	England
343 (144.5 overs); Dean Jones 184* (421); Gladstone Small 5/75 (33 overs)		275 (94 overs); David Gower 72 (144); Peter Taylor 6/78 (26 overs)
251 (117 overs); Steve Waugh 73 (172); John Emburey 7/78 (46 overs)		264 (114 overs); Mike Gatting 96 (161); Peter Sleep 5/72 (35 overs)

Australia won by 55 runs
Sydney Cricket Ground, Sydney
Umpires: Peter McConnell and Steve Randell
Player of the match: Peter Taylor (AUS)

- Australia won the toss and elected to bat.
- 13 January was taken as a rest day.
- PL Taylor (AUS) made his Test debut.

England, wanting to recall Dilley now that he was fit again, but also wanting to keep Small because of his five-for at Melbourne, solved the problem by dropping Phillip DeFreitas to make way. Australia, with the Ashes lost, made several changes: they dropped their opener David Boon, who apart from his century at Adelaide had had a terrible series, and also dropped the off-spinning all-rounder Greg Matthews, recalling two specialist batsmen in their place: Ritchie, who had missed out at Melbourne, and Dirk Wellham. With no specialist opener selected to replace Boon, Ritchie was pushed up the order to fill the vacancy (a move which was to prove unsuccessful). McDermott also lost his place to debutant Peter Taylor.

This match will always be remembered as "Taylor's match". When the team for the Test was announced, the Australian selectors had included the name of Peter Taylor from NSW. Thinking that a mistake in names had been made, the Australian media besieged the home of the talented young NSW opener Mark Taylor, thinking that he had been selected to play his first Test - especially since the dropping of Boon had left no replacement opener in the squad. Although history shows that Mark Taylor had a substantial Test career later on, the selectors had made no mistake in the name. NSW off-spinner Peter Taylor had impressed some selectors (especially Greg Chappell) with his all-round abilities during the previous season's Sheffield Shield final. He was noted as an off-spinner who really spun the ball and a number of the wickets he took during the test match were attributed to his 'loop' (the deceptive flight of a heavily spun cricket ball) and bounce from his unusual but high bowling action. Considering Peter Taylor's limited first-class experience, the selection was risky. The selection was unexpected to the point that the media quickly dubbed him "Peter Who?", and he became something of a celebrity leading up to the match. Spectators voiced their opinion too on the first day of the match. "Aussie Selectors couldn't pick Bill Lawry's Nose" declared one banner. However, Taylor later received the man of the match award.

The Australian first innings was dominated by Jones' 184 not out – his first century of the season and only his second Test century. Jones was lucky not to be out for 5, as video replays seemed to indicate that he had been caught behind. Australia managed 343 in the first innings, with Jones featuring in some very important late-wicket partnerships: the second highest score of the innings was Border's 34, while Small justified his retention by taking another five-wicket haul.

Given the dominance of England's batting throughout the season and the limited nature of Australia's bowling, both sides were surprised as England stuttered to 3/17 in their first innings, with Merv Hughes providing the venom he had been promising. Hughes, still inexperienced at this point, was one of the players the selectors stuck with despite his poor form. England recovered somewhat through the strokeplay of Gower and an unexpected 69 from John Emburey (who kept falling over when playing the sweep shot). But it was debutant Peter Taylor taking 6/78 off 26 overs that ran through the middle order, including the dangerous Ian Botham.

Australia's second innings began badly again, then recovered slightly while Jones and Border were batting, then slumped again to 7/145. Steve Waugh (73) partnered Peter Taylor (42) in a 98 run partnership that, in the end, proved to be match-winning. Waugh, still potentially "the next big thing" and in front of his home crowd, was an attractive stroke-maker while Taylor, on the other hand, had little natural strokeplay but relied upon his concentration. John Emburey, the English off-spinner, was taking every advantage of the wearing pitch with 7/78 off 46 overs.

With 320 to win on a wearing pitch, England applied themselves against the inexperienced Australian attack and aimed for victory. Gatting, out for 0 in the first innings, took England to 5/233, but was out caught and bowled by all-rounder Steve Waugh for 96. With the pitch getting worse, England put off thoughts of victory and worked to draw the match. John Emburey batted for over an hour for his 22, but was clean bowled in the penultimate over to a Peter Sleep leg-spinner that kept low. This gave Australia its first victory in 14 Tests, by a margin of 55 runs. Peter Sleep finished with 5/72 – his only 5 wicket haul in Tests.

== Statistics ==
=== Leading runscorers ===
Name	Innings	Not Outs	Runs	H / S	Average	100s	50s	S / R
(Australia) Dean Jones	10	1	511	184*	56.77	1	3	41.24
(England) Chris Broad	9	2	487	162	69.57	3		43.63
(Australia) Allan Border	10	1	473	125	52.55	2	1	40.18
(Australia) Geoff Marsh	10	0	429	110	42.9	1	2	35.69
(England) David Gower	8	1	404	136	57.71	1	2	62.63

Abbreviations: H / S – Highest score in an innings; S / R – Strike rate: runs per 100 balls faced

=== Leading wicket-takers ===
Name	Balls	Runs	Wickets	Average	BBI	5w/i	10w/m	S/R
(Australia) Bruce Reid	1192	527	20	26.35	4/64			59.6
(England) John Emburey	1895	663	18	36.83	7/78	2		105.27
(England) Graham Dilley	1057	511	16	31.93	5/68	1		66.06
(England) Phil Edmonds	1570	538	15	35.86	3/45			104.66
(England) Gladstone Small	472	180	12	15	5/48	2		39.33

Abbreviations: BBI – Best Bowling figures in an Innings; 5w/i – 5 wickets in an innings; 10w/m – 10 wickets in a match; S / R – Strike Rate = Balls per Wickets
