= Bicentennial Test =

The Bicentennial Test
- Date: 29 January 1988 – 2 February 1988
- Location: Australia
- Result: Match Drawn
Teams
- England: Australia
Captains
- Mike Gatting: Allan Border
Most runs
- 139 Chris Broad: 196 David Boon
Most wickets
- 3 Graham Dilley 3 Eddie Hemmings: 4 Peter Taylor; 3 Steve Waugh

The Bicentennial Test was a single Test cricket match played between Australia and England at the Sydney Cricket Ground in celebration of the bicentenary of permanent colonial settlement in Australia. The match took place from 29 January to 2 February 1988 and was drawn. It did not count as part of The Ashes series, in the same way as the Centenary Tests in 1977 and 1980 also were excluded from the Ashes lists.

The match was played in the middle of an England tour to New Zealand, where the team later played three Test matches, all of them also drawn. In late 1987, the England team had toured Pakistan, and Australia had hosted Tests and One Day Internationals against New Zealand. Australia also hosted a single test against Sri Lanka after the Bicentennial test in Perth in February 1988.

Following the test, a one-day international was also played as part of the bicentennial celebrations, which Australia won.

== The teams ==
Sydney's reputation for favouring spin bowling led both sides to pick two specialist spin bowlers and to favour medium-pace or fast-medium bowling over out-and-out speed.

England were captained by Mike Gatting, fresh from his finger-wagging confrontation with umpire Shakoor Rana, and lacked several of the big name players of recent years, such as Graham Gooch, David Gower, Allan Lamb, and Ian Botham.

The team was, in batting order:

- Chris Broad
- Martyn Moxon
- Tim Robinson
- Mike Gatting (captain)
- Bill Athey
- David Capel
- John Emburey
- Bruce French (wicketkeeper)
- Neil Foster
- Eddie Hemmings
- Graham Dilley

Australia were captained by Allan Border. The team, in batting order, was:

- Geoff Marsh
- David Boon
- Dean Jones
- Allan Border (captain)
- Mike Veletta
- Steve Waugh
- Peter Sleep
- Greg Dyer (wicketkeeper)
- Peter Taylor
- Tony Dodemaide
- Craig McDermott

== The match ==
England won the toss and batted. Broad shared stands of 93 with Moxon, who made 40, and 99 with Robinson, who made 43, on his way to a century on the first day. Wickets fell more steadily across the second day, including Broad for 139. Broad reacted angrily to his dismissal, and flattened the leg stump with his bat as he departed: he was fined the maximum permitted (£500) by the tour manager. England's final total of 425 contained no other scores of more than 50: the next highest after Broad was French with 47.

On the third day, Australia batted poorly and lost wickets regularly to shots more suited to one-day cricket. Jones made 56, but when bad light ended play two hours early, the side was 164 for seven wickets, 62 runs short of the follow-on. In tense cricket on the fourth morning, they failed to reach that figure by 12 runs, and Gatting enforced the follow-on. With the pitch getting slower and easier, Marsh and Boon put up a first-wicket partnership of 162 and after Marsh went for 56, Boon batted on and on across the final day, eventually reaching 184 not out, his then-highest Test score, as Australia got to 328 for two to save the match. They were helped by the loss of more play to bad light (when Gatting recalled fast bowler Dilley to the attack), injuries to both Dilley and Foster and lack of penetration among the other England bowlers.

The match was watched by 103,831 people, well below the forecast figure.

=== Match statistics ===
29 January–2 February 1988
Scorecard

England	v	Australia
425 (172.5 overs); Chris Broad 139 (361); Peter Taylor 4/84 (34 overs)		214 (96.1 overs); Dean Jones 56 (125); Eddie Hemmings 3/53 (22 overs)
		328/2 (135 overs) (f/o); David Boon 184* (431); David Capel 1/38 (17 overs)

Match drawn
Sydney Cricket Ground
Umpires: Tony Crafter (Aus) and Peter McConnell (Aus)
Player of the match: David Boon (Aus)

- England won the toss and elected to bat

== See also ==
- Bicentenary Celebration match
