= 1986–87 Australian Tri-Series =

International cricket tournament

1986–87 World Series
- Date: 17 January 1987 – 11 February 1987
- Location: Australia
- Result: Won by England; 2–0 in final series
Teams
Australia	England	West Indies
Captains
Allan Border	Mike Gatting	Viv Richards
Most runs
Most wickets

The 1986–87 World Series was a One Day International (ODI) cricket tri-series where Australia played host to England and West Indies. Australia and England reached the Finals, which England won 2–0. England and West Indies contested the tri-series for the first time since the 1979-80 season.

== Points table ==
Team	P	W	L	T	NR	Pts	RR
Australia	8	5	3	0	0	10	4.404
England	8	4	4	0	0	8	3.936
West Indies	8	3	5	0	0	6	3.483

== Uniforms ==
Australia
Australia kit

England
England kit

West Indies
West Indies kit

== Result summary ==
17 January 1987
Scorecard

West Indies; 154 (46.3 overs)	v	England; 156/4 (43.1 overs)
DL Haynes 48 (75); GR Dilley 4/23 (8.3 overs)		BC Broad 49 (113); RA Harper 2/43 (10 overs)

England won by 6 wickets
Brisbane Cricket Ground, Woolloongabba, Brisbane
Umpires: MW Johnson and PJ McConnell
Player of the match: GR Dilley (ENG)

- England won the toss and elected to field

18 January 1987
Scorecard

Australia; 261/4 (50 overs)	v	England; 250/9 (50 overs)
DM Jones 101 (101); GR Dilley 2/40 (10 overs)		CWJ Athey 111 (152); BA Reid 2/34 (10 overs)

Australia won by 11 runs
Brisbane Cricket Ground, Woolloongabba, Brisbane
Umpires: MW Johnson and PJ McConnell
Player of the match: DM Jones (AUS)

- Australia won the toss and elected to bat
- PL Taylor (AUS) made his ODI debut.

20 January 1987 (D/N)
Scorecard

Australia; 181/6 (50 overs)	v	West Indies; 182/3 (48.2 overs)
AR Border 64* (120); MD Marshall 2/40 (9 overs)		DL Haynes 67 (121); GRJ Matthews 1/27 (10 overs)

West Indies won by 7 wickets
Melbourne Cricket Ground, Melbourne
Umpires: AR Crafter and RA French
Player of the match: DL Haynes (WI)

- West Indies won the toss and elected to field

22 January 1987 (D/N)
Scorecard

Australia; 233/8 (50 overs)	v	England; 234/7 (49.5 overs)
DM Wellham 97 (144); JE Emburey 3/42 (9 overs)		AJ Lamb 77* (102); SP O'Donnell 3/39 (8 overs)

England won by 3 wickets
Sydney Cricket Ground, Sydney
Umpires: AR Crafter and RA French
Player of the match: AJ Lamb (ENG)

- Australia won the toss and elected to bat
- Allan Lamb hit 18 runs from the final over to secure the victory.

24 January 1987
Scorecard

England; 252/6 (50 overs)	v	West Indies; 163 (45.5 overs)
CWJ Athey 64 (110); CA Walsh 2/55 (10 overs)		IVA Richards 43 (64); AL Logie 43 (56); JE Emburey 4/37 (10 overs)

England won by 89 runs
Adelaide Oval, Adelaide
Umpires: BE Martin and SG Randell
Player of the match: BC Broad (ENG)

- West Indies won the toss and elected to field

25 January 1987
Scorecard

West Indies; 237/5 (50 overs)	v	Australia; 221/9 (50 overs)
RB Richardson 72 (134); SR Waugh 2/41 (7 overs)		GR Marsh 94 (137); CA Walsh 3/46 (10 overs)

West Indies won by 16 runs
Adelaide Oval, Adelaide
Umpires: RC Bailhache and AR Crafter
Player of the match: GR Marsh (AUS)

- Australia won the toss and elected to field

26 January 1987
Scorecard

Australia; 225/6 (50 overs)	v	England; 192 (48.1 overs)
AR Border 91 (122); PAJ DeFreitas 4/35 (10 overs)		BC Broad 46 (95); MW Gatting 46 (54); PL Taylor 3/29 (7.1 overs)

Australia won by 33 runs
Adelaide Oval, Adelaide
Umpires: AR Crafter and SG Randell
Player of the match: SR Waugh (AUS)

- Australia won the toss and elected to bat

28 January 1987 (D/N)
Scorecard

Australia; 194 (50 overs)	v	West Indies; 158 (46.1 overs)
DM Wellham 39 (60); MD Marshall 2/29 (10 overs)		IVA Richards 70 (96); SP O'Donnell 4/19 (10 overs)

Australia won by 36 runs
Sydney Cricket Ground, Sydney
Umpires: RA French and MW Johnson
Player of the match: SP O'Donnell (AUS)

- Australia won the toss and elected to bat

30 January 1987 (D/N)
Scorecard

England; 147 (48.2 overs)	v	West Indies; 148/4 (48.3 overs)
JE Emburey 34 (53); MD Marshall 3/30 (9.2 overs)		IVA Richards 58 (84); NA Foster 2/25 (9 overs)

West Indies won by 6 wickets
Melbourne Cricket Ground, Melbourne
Umpires: RC Bailache and SG Randell
Player of the match: IVA Richards (WI)

- England won the toss and elected to bat
- Michael Holding played his last ODI game.

1 February 1987
Scorecard

Australia; 248/5 (50 overs)	v	England; 139 (47.3 overs)
DM Jones 93 (100); MW Gatting 3/59 (9 overs)		IT Botham 45 (87); SR Waugh 3/26 (10 overs)

Australia won by 109 runs
Melbourne Cricket Ground, Melbourne
Umpires: RA French and BE Martin
Player of the match: SR Waugh (AUS)

- England won the toss and elected to field

3 February 1987
Scorecard

England; 177/9 (50 overs)	v	West Indies; 148 (48 overs)
BC Broad 76 (143); MD Marshall 3/31 (10 overs)		PJL Dujon 34 (57); JE Emburey 3/26 (9 overs)

England won by 29 runs
Devonport Oval, Devonport, Tasmania
Umpires: AR Crafter and SG Randell
Player of the match: BC Broad (ENG)

- West Indies won the toss and elected to field

6 February 1987 (D/N)
Scorecard

West Indies; 192 (49 overs)	v	Australia; 195/8 (49.1 overs)
TRO Payne 60 (119); PL Taylor 3/36 (10 overs)		TJ Zoehrer 50 (59); IVA Richards 3/29 (7 overs)

Australia won by 2 wickets
Sydney Cricket Ground, Sydney
Umpires: RA French and PJ McConnell
Player of the match: TJ Zoehrer (AUS)

- West Indies won the toss and elected to bat

== Final series ==
England won the best of three final series against Australia 2–0.

8 February 1987
Scorecard

Australia; 171/8 (44 overs)	v	England; 172/4 (36 overs)
DM Jones 67 (107); GR Dilley 3/32 (9 overs)		IT Botham 71 (52); GRJ Matthews 3/27 (9 overs)

England won by 6 wickets
Melbourne Cricket Ground, Melbourne
Umpires: PJ McConnell and SG Randell

- England won the toss and elected to field
- The match was reduced before play started to 44 overs per side

11 February 1987 (D/N)
Scorecard

England; 187/9 (50 overs)	v	Australia; 179/8 (50 overs)
BC Broad 53 (87); PL Taylor 2/29 (10 overs)		SP O'Donnell 40* (27); IT Botham 3/26 (10 overs)

England won by 8 runs
Sydney Cricket Ground, Sydney
Umpires: AR Crafter and RA French
Player of the match: IT Botham (ENG)

- England won the toss and elected to bat
