= Martyn Moxon =

English cricketer

Personal information
- Full name: Martyn Douglas Moxon
- Born: 4 May 1960 (age 66); Stairfoot, Barnsley, Yorkshire, England
- Nickname: Frog
- Height: 6 ft 1 in (1.85 m)
- Batting: Right-handed
- Bowling: Right-arm medium
- Role: Batsman

International information
- National side: England
- Test debut (cap 520): 24 July 1986 v New Zealand
- Last Test: 10 August 1989 v Australia
- ODI debut (cap 79): 23 January 1985 v India
- Last ODI: 19 March 1988 v New Zealand

Domestic team information
- Years: Team
- 1980–1997: Yorkshire
- 1982/83–1983/84: Griqualand West

Career statistics
Competition	Test	ODI	FC	LA
Matches	10	8	317	256
Runs scored	455	174	21,161	7,813
Batting average	28.43	21.75	42.83	34.41
100s/50s	0/3	0/1	45/116	7/51
Top score	99	70	274*	141*
Balls bowled	48	–	2,650	1,500
Wickets	0	–	28	34
Bowling average	–	–	52.89	35.85
5 wickets in innings	–	–	0	1
10 wickets in match	–	–	0	0
Best bowling	–	–	3/24	5/31
Catches/stumpings	10/–	5/–	218/–	88/–
- Source: CricketArchive, 19 August 2007

Martyn Douglas Moxon (born 4 May 1960) is a former English cricketer, who played in ten Test matches and eight One Day Internationals for England and for Yorkshire County Cricket Club between 1980 and 1997. In May 2007, Moxon was confirmed as Director of Professional Cricket at Yorkshire, a role which he left in December 2021.

== International career ==
Moxon earned 10 caps through his Test career that was delayed by injury. He was due to play against the West Indies in 1984, but a broken arm meant that his debut was delayed until the 1986 series against New Zealand. In the intervening time, Moxon was chosen for the 1984/5 tour of India and Sri Lanka, but the premature death of his father forced him to miss early matches, by which time, Tim Robinson had cemented his place as Graeme Fowler's opening partner. Moxon did make his one-day-international debut later in the tour, making 70 on his debut at Nagpur, which remained his highest ODI score.

When his Test debut finally did come, he took his chance well. As Graham Gooch's sixth opening partner of the Test and ODI summer (after Graeme Fowler, Robinson, Wilf Slack, Mark Benson, and Bill Athey, with Wayne Larkins also initially being called into a Test squad before pulling out due to injury), Moxon took on a New Zealand side that boasted Richard Hadlee. Wisden Cricket Monthly described Moxon as batting with "little panache, but a lot of polish" during a maiden innings of 74, which was ended when a Hadlee off cutter squeezed through his gate. In the second innings at Lord's and during the second Test at Trent Bridge, Moxon was unable to build on his promising start, and was left out of the side for The Oval, having scored 111 runs in his first four innings, at an average of 27.75.

The winter touring party for the trip to Australia in 1986/7 was far from settled in advance. Chris Broad was recalled after a two-year absence, Wilf Slack brought back having missed all but one Test during the summer, and Bill Athey was included as an 'auxiliary' batsman. The choice of two left-handers at the top of England's order highlighted the fact that Australia's big threat came from the battery of left arm seamers available to them, led by Bruce Reid. In the event, Slack, out of form, played no International cricket on the tour while Athey and Broad flourished as an opening pair, Broad going on to be named as the International Cricketer of the Season, and England retaining the Ashes. Moxon had to wait until the last Test of 1987 for a recall. Such were England's selection uncertainties that Tim Robinson had been recalled again in the intervening time.

Moxon was described by Cricinfo as "the unluckiest of the eight men to make 99 in a Test but never a century". This observation is made because early in Moxon's innings when he made 99, in the second test against New Zealand in 1987–88 (Moxon's sixth test in total), he swept three runs seemingly off the middle of the bat only for the umpire to signal leg byes, costing Moxon the runs that would have taken him to a century. He appeared also to be building an innings in the next test, but rain washed out the last two days with Moxon stuck on 81 not out.

In June 1988, Moxon was recalled to the test side at Lord's in place of Mike Gatting to bat at number 3. By this time, television commentators such as Tom Graveney had begun to spot a discernible hole in Moxon's technique: when playing forward his left knee would not come forward quite far enough creating a small "gate". Malcolm Marshall exploited this in the Old Trafford test of that series, bowling Moxon "through the gate". England lost both Test matches heavily and lost the series.

His final test match came the following summer, for an England again being heavily beaten. Australia batted first at Trent Bridge, rival opening batters Geoff Marsh and Mark Taylor batting through the whole of the first day without being dismissed. Finally getting into bat just before lunch on the third day, Moxon suffered somewhat by the comparison and was dismissed by Terry Alderman (who was having a prolific summer against English batters) for 0 in the first over. In the second innings Moxon was demoted down the order. Although he at least got on the score sheet, making 18, England were heavily beaten again and Moxon never played for England again, although he captained an England 'A' tour of Australia in 1992–3.

Moxon played in a struggling era for English cricket, the team not winning any of the Test matches in which he played, and only 2 of his 8 ODIs. As of May 2022, only one England player (Bruce French, who played alongside Moxon in most of Moxon's tests) played more Tests for England without finishing on the winning side.

== County cricket ==
Moxon's county career spanned seventeen seasons with Yorkshire, where he scored over 21,000 first-class runs. He began his career with two centuries in his first two home County Championship matches, and it was not long before his elegant driving saw him earmarked for England honours. He established a reliable opening partnership with Ashley Metcalfe, and later captained the county with dignity.

Very much in the mould of Geoffrey Boycott, with whom he opened for Yorkshire at the start of his county career, Moxon was one of the Cricketers of the Year named by Wisden in 1993. The previous year had been a momentous one for the county and Moxon as captain since the club had fielded its first black or Asian player, and only its second overseas player (after Craig White), Sachin Tendulkar.

His career also coincided with a struggling period for Yorkshire, although he did help them to win the Benson and Hedges Cup in 1987, being named man of the match in their semi-final victory over Surrey.

== Retirement from playing ==
Upon retirement, he went on to become Director of Coaching at Yorkshire, before moving on to coach Durham in 2001. Upon his resignation on 1 March 2007, he returned to Yorkshire County Cricket Club as the club's Director of Professional Cricket. In 2014 he oversaw Yorkshire's first County Championship title since 2001.

In November 2021, during the Yorkshire Cricket racism controversy, Moxon took leave from his role as director of cricket at the county citing stress.

On 3 December 2021 it was announced that Moxon, along with 16 other Yorkshire staff, would leave his role
