= English cricket team in Australia in 1986–87 =

International cricket tour

England in Australia in 1986/87
	Australia	England
- Dates: 11 October 1986 – 14 February 1987
Captains	Allan Border	Mike Gatting

Test series
- Result: England won the 5-match series 2–1
Most runs	Dean Jones (511)	Chris Broad (487)
Most wickets	Bruce Reid (20)	John Emburey (18)

The England cricket team toured Australia during the 1986–87 cricket season for a five-match Test series to contest The Ashes. While in Australia, England also played a number of tour matches against state and representative teams, and competed in two One-Day International (ODI) tournaments. Under the captaincy of Mike Gatting, England retained the Ashes with a 2–1 series win.

== Lead-up to the series ==
Both England and Australia begun this series at a low ebb. England had lost 5–0 against the West Indies the previous year, then lost 2–0 and 1–0 to India and New Zealand respectively during the English summer. Australia, during the same period, had lost two series against New Zealand (2–1 and 1–0) and drew two series against India. While Australia had emerged with a drawn series from their tour of India, they had struggled against India at home the previous season and India had been unlucky not to have won the Boxing Day Test in Melbourne.

Considering the losses that both teams had sustained, it was only natural that many felt this series was merely a battle for Test cricket's Wooden spoon. Australia had managed a tie in Madras and many commentators felt that Australia's batting had strengthened somewhat. The performances of Victorian batsmen Dean Jones and the new opening pair of David Boon and Geoff Marsh had been noted. Young NSW all-rounder, Stephen Waugh, was also beginning to make his presence felt, although certainly not to the level that many expected him. The bowling was still problematic, although Bruce Reid had begun to perform well.

== England squad ==
The England squad that flew out to Australia on 9 October 1986 had a number of significant absentees from the previous series win; Graham Gooch was absent for personal reasons, while Tim Robinson and Richard Ellison had been dropped following poor performances against West Indies. More than half the players in the squad, including the appointed captain Mike Gatting, were on their first tour of Australia.

- Mike Gatting (c) (Middlesex)
- John Emburey (vc) (Middlesex)
- Bill Athey (Gloucestershire)
- Ian Botham (Somerset)
- Chris Broad (Nottinghamshire)
- Phillip DeFreitas (Leicestershire)
- Graham Dilley (Kent)
- Phil Edmonds (Middlesex)
- Neil Foster (Essex)
- Bruce French (wk) (Nottinghamshire)
- David Gower (Leicestershire)
- Allan Lamb (Northamptonshire)
- Jack Richards (wk) (Surrey)
- Wilf Slack (Middlesex)
- Gladstone Small (Warwickshire)
- James Whitaker (Leicestershire)

Support staff included Peter Lush (Tour manager), Micky Stewart (Team Manager), Laurie Brown (Physio) and Peter Austen (Scorer).

== Tour matches ==
England began its tour at Brisbane in October 1986, losing the first game to Queensland by 5 wickets. Dirk Tazelaar, a tall, left arm bowler, took 4/34 in the first innings. England's batsmen were generally lacking form, though Ian Botham struck 86 off 67 balls, including eleven fours and four sixes – one six shattering a window at long-off. England's fielding was poor, with many catches dropped despite some effective bowling.

A morale boosting 5-wicket victory against South Australia followed. Allan Lamb and tour debutant James Whitaker hit centuries while spinner John Emburey found form. It also marked the end of a depressing run of fourteen losses for the England team (including Test and tour matches). Parkinson, another left-arm fast bowler, took 5/87 in England's first innings. Experts began to question England's vulnerability against left-arm fast bowling.

The next match, in Perth, resulted in an embarrassing performance against Western Australia. Rain ensured the match ended in a draw, but England would have easily lost had the rain stayed away. Five catches were dropped in the first innings as Australian opener Geoff Marsh scored 124 in 345 minutes. Two left-arm quicks, Chris Matthews and Bruce Reid, took four wickets each as England collapsed for 152. Marsh then batted 246 minutes for his 63 in the second innings as Western Australia looked for a declaration. The match ended with England 6 for 153. David Gower, a very important member of the England lineup, had been dismissed for a "duck" in both innings. Captain Mike Gatting, vice captain Allan Lamb and backup opener Wilf Slack had also been dismissed for zero once each during the match.

Australia therefore approached the first Test as clear favourites. Martin Johnson of The Independent wrote that the English team "had only three things wrong with them – can't bat, can't bowl, can't field". Australia selected two left-arm fast bowlers – Bruce Reid and Chris Matthews (both from Western Australia) – to take advantage of the clear problem the English batsmen had with this sort of bowling.

== Test series ==
=== 1st Test ===
14–19 November 1986
Scorecard

England; 456 (134 overs) & 3/77 (22.3 overs)	v	Australia; 248 (104.4 overs) & 282 (f/o) (116.5 overs)

England won by 7 wickets
The Gabba, Brisbane

=== 2nd Test ===
28 November–3 December 1986
Scorecard

England; 8/592d (170.1 overs) & 8/199d (53.3 overs)	v	Australia; 401 (134.4 overs) & 4/197 (97 overs)

Match drawn
WACA Ground, Perth

=== 3rd Test ===
12–16 December 1986
Scorecard

Australia; 5/514d (171 overs) & 3/201d (90 overs)	v	England; 455 (148.4 overs) & 2/39 (23 overs)

Match drawn
Adelaide Oval, Adelaide

=== 4th Test ===
26–28 December 1986
Scorecard

Australia; 141 (54.4 overs) & 194 (73.4 overs)	v	England; 349 (120.5 overs)

England won by an innings and 14 runs
Melbourne Cricket Ground, Melbourne

=== 5th Test ===
10–15 January 1987
Scorecard

Australia; 343 (144.5 overs) & 251 (117 overs)	v	England; 275 (94 overs) & 264 (114 overs)

Australia won by 55 runs
Sydney Cricket Ground, Sydney

== One-day Tournaments ==
=== Benson & Hedges Perth Challenge ===
The Benson & Hedges Perth Challenge was a one-off one-day international tournament held at the WACA Ground, Perth in late December 1986 and early January 1987. It was part of the celebrations marking Australia's defence of the America's Cup yachting competition which was taking place simultaneously in nearby Fremantle.

Australia, England, Pakistan and the West Indies were the competitors. The games were played over a league basis and in coloured clothing, with Pakistan beating the West Indies in the first match under the new WACA floodlights. In England's victory over Australia, Ian Botham hit 26 runs off one over. England then inflicted a defeat over the then-dominant West Indies before beating Pakistan in a "dress rehearsal" of the final. Australia had a miserable tournament, losing all three games and being bowled out for a mere 91 in its game against the West Indies. Australian batsman Dean Jones did have a fine tournament, however, hitting back-to-back centuries. In the final, England comfortably beat Pakistan with 9.5 overs to spare.

Team	Played	Won	Lost	Tied	N/R	Pts	RR
England	3	3	0	0	0	6	4.924
Pakistan	3	2	1	0	0	4	4.685
West Indies	3	1	2	0	0	2	4.193
Australia	3	0	3	0	0	0	4.020

==== Final ====
7 January 1987
Scorecard

Pakistan; 166/9 (50 overs)	v	England; 167/5 (40.1 overs)
Javed Miandad 77 (127); Gladstone Small 3/28 (10 overs)		Mike Gatting 49 (72); Wasim Akram 3/27 (10 overs)

England won by 5 wickets
WACA Ground, Perth
Umpires: Tony Crafter (Aus) and Dick French (Aus)
Player of the match: Javed Miandad (Pak)

- England won the toss and elected to field.

=== World Series Cup ===
The 1987 World Series Cup triangular tournament featured Australia, England and the West Indies, with games played at five venues:

- Melbourne
- Sydney
- Adelaide
- Brisbane
- Devonport

Each team played a total of eight games to reach the best of three final. Australia had a significantly better time than they had in the Perth Challenge, winning five of their eight qualifying games to top the group, ahead of England, with the West Indies eliminated. However, England rounded off their successful tour with a convincing 2–0 victory in the final series.

Team	Played	Won	Lost	Tied	N/R	Pts	RR
Australia	8	5	3	0	0	10	4.404
England	8	4	4	0	0	8	3.936
West Indies	8	3	5	0	0	6	3.483
Player of the Series: IVA Richards (WIN)

==== Finals ====
8 February 1987
Scorecard

Australia; 171/8 (44 overs)	v	England; 172/4 (36 overs)
DM Jones 67 (107); GR Dilley 3/32 (9 overs)		IT Botham 71 (52); GRJ Matthews 3/27 (9 overs)

England won by 6 wickets
MCG, Melbourne
Umpires: PJ McConnell (Aus) and SG Randell (Aus)

- England won the toss and elected to field.

11 February 1987
Scorecard

England; 187/9 (50 overs)	v	Australia; 179/8 (50 overs)
BC Broad 53 (87); PL Taylor 2/29 (10 overs)		SP O'Donnell 40* (27); IT Botham 3/26 (10 overs)

England won by 8 runs
SCG, Sydney
Umpires: AR Crafter (Aus) and RA French (Aus)
Player of the match: IT Botham (Eng)

- England won the toss and elected to bat.
- England won the best of 3-match series 2–0
  Player of the Series: IT Botham (Eng)

== Historical context of the series ==
Despite his promising debut, Australian off-spinner Peter Taylor never dominated a Test match in the same way again. Apart from a score of 54 not out against Pakistan a few years later and 87 against New Zealand in 1990, Taylor's overall Test record was mediocre.

Chris Broad also suffered from lack of consistency after this series. Despite his wonderful run of centuries, he never again dominated a bowling attack the way he did during this tour. He scored 116 against Pakistan in the infamous December 1987 Test, then 139 against Australia again in the Bicentenary Test match. However, Broad eventually finished with just 1661 Test runs at an average of 39.54. His final Test was during the 1989 Ashes series, where he scored 18 and 20 at Lord's.

A number of other England players failed to live up to their potential from this series. Gladstone Small played only 17 Tests and took 55 wickets for an average of 34 runs. Young wicketkeeper Jack Richards found that the selectors preferred Bruce French when he returned to England. Richards retired before he turned 30, having played only 8 Tests. His 133 at Perth was his only Test century.

Philip DeFreitas, in his debut tour, eventually turned into an effective bowler for England, though he was never able to live up to the "Black Botham" tag that some had given him. Graham Dilley was another who served England well until his final Test in 1989.

A number of Australians were able to learn from this series and were able to transform themselves into better players as a result. David Boon's Test career was written off after this series. Dean Jones lived up to his promise, while Steve Waugh, after a long period of time, finally began to deliver on his ability and was one of Australia's most important players in the 1990s. Australia's bowlers, notably Geoff Lawson, Merv Hughes and Craig McDermott, all returned to form and were integral parts of future teams that defeated England in 1989, 1990–91, 1993, and 1994–95. Bruce Reid's performances improved markedly, but back injuries limited his Test career.

After this, England would not win an Ashes series for 18 years.

== See also ==
- Cricket
- The Ashes

== Bibliography ==
- Grand Slam: England in Australia, 1986–87 by Christopher Martin-Jenkins, ISBN 0-671-65512-4
- England in Australia, 1986–87 by John Thicknesse, from the Wisden Cricketers' Almanack 1988, ISBN 0-947766-10-3
