= English cricket team in Australia in 1987–88 =

International cricket tour

The England national cricket team visited Australia in January 1988 and played one Test match at the Sydney Cricket Ground against the Australia national cricket team. The Test match was drawn and the teams also played a Limited Overs International (LOI) at the Melbourne Cricket Ground, won by Australia. England were in Australia as part of the country's Bicentenary celebrations of 1988. The Ashes were not at stake in the one-off Bicentennial Test.

== Bicentennial Test ==
29 January–2 February 1988
Scorecard

England	v	Australia
425 (172.5 overs); Chris Broad 139 (361); Peter Taylor 4/84 (34 overs)		214 (96.1 overs); Dean Jones 56 (125); Eddie Hemmings 3/53 (22 overs)
		328/2 (135 overs) (f/o); David Boon 184* (431); David Capel 1/38 (17 overs)

Match drawn
Sydney Cricket Ground
Umpires: Tony Crafter (Aus) and Peter McConnell (Aus)
Player of the match: David Boon (Aus)

- England won the toss and elected to bat

== One-Day International Match ==
4 February 1988 (D/N)
Scorecard

Australia; 235/6 (48 overs)	v	England; 213/8 (48 overs)
GR Marsh 87 (122); JE Emburey 2/53 (10 overs)		MW Gatting 37 (47); MR Whitney 2/37 (10 overs)

Australia won by 22 runs
Melbourne Cricket Ground, Melbourne
Umpires: RC Bailhache and AR Crafter
Player of the match: GR Marsh (AUS)

- Australia won the toss and elected to bat.
- The match was reduced to 48 overs per side.
- PW Jarvis and NV Radford (both ENG) made their ODI debuts.
