= 1986 Ashes series =

1986 Ashes series may refer to:

- The Ashes series contested whilst the English cricket team in Australia in 1986–87
- The Ashes series contested during the 1986 Kangaroo tour of Great Britain and France
