= Phillip DeFreitas =

English cricketer

Personal information
- Full name: Phillip Anthony Jason DeFreitas
- Born: 18 February 1966 (age 60); Scotts Head, Dominica
- Nickname: Daffy
- Height: 6 ft 0 in (1.83 m)
- Batting: Right-handed
- Bowling: Right arm fast-medium
- Role: Bowling All-rounder

International information
- National side: England (1986-1997)
- Test debut (cap 522): 14 November 1986 v Australia
- Last Test: 11 June 1995 v West Indies
- ODI debut (cap 91): 1 January 1987 v Australia
- Last ODI: 24 May 1997 v Australia

Domestic team information
- Years: Team
- 1985–1988: Leicestershire
- 1988–1993: Lancashire
- 1993–1996: Boland
- 1994–1999: Derbyshire
- 2000–2005: Leicestershire

Career statistics
Competition	Test	ODI	FC	LA
Matches	44	103	372	479
Runs scored	934	690	10,991	5,181
Batting average	14.82	16.04	22.75	18.56
100s/50s	0/4	0/1	10/54	0/13
Top score	88	67	123*	90
Balls bowled	9,838	5,712	72,073	23,007
Wickets	140	115	1,248	539
Bowling average	33.57	32.82	27.89	27.92
5 wickets in innings	4	0	61	7
10 wickets in match	0	0	6	0
Best bowling	7/70	4/35	7/21	5/13
Catches/stumpings	14/–	26/–	127/–	101/–
Medal record
Men's Cricket
Representing England
ICC Cricket World Cup
Runner-up	1987 India and Pakistan
Runner-up	1992 Australia and New Zealand
- Source: Cricinfo, 20 August 2009

Phillip Anthony Jason "Daffy" DeFreitas (born 18 February 1966) is an English former cricketer. He played county cricket for Leicestershire, Lancashire and Derbyshire, as well as appearing in 44 Test matches and 103 ODIs. Cricket writer Colin Bateman noted that "DeFreitas was an explosive hitter when the mood took him, an aggressive pace bowler, inclined to pitch everything short and a spectacular fielder". He was a part of the English squad which finished as runners-up at the 1987 Cricket World Cup and as runners-up at the 1992 Cricket World Cup.

DeFreitas is the only player in the history of the County Championship to take a five-wicket haul against each of the 18 first-class counties.

== Early career ==
DeFreitas went to Willesden High School, in Willesden, London, where he played football and cricket. He had trials at Luton Town F.C., but although offered an apprenticeship, wanted to play cricket.

== Domestic career ==
DeFreitas made his first-class debut for Leicestershire in 1985 against Oxford University and recorded the startling bowling analysis of 3.4–2–3–3 as the students collapsed to a humiliating 24 all out. The following year he had a wonderful season, taking what was to remain a career high of 94 wickets and scoring his maiden century (at number 9) against Kent, and he was selected for the successful Ashes tour in 1986/87.

In the course of his 21 seasons in first-class cricket, DeFreitas had a somewhat nomadic county career, playing for Leicestershire from his debut in 1985 until 1988, then Lancashire from 1989 to 1993, and Derbyshire from 1994 to 1999. In 2000, he returned to Leicestershire, averaging over 45 with the bat that season, and captained the side in 2003 and part of 2004. He also played for the South African side, Boland, in 1993/94 and 1994/95.

With Lancashire he was part of the team that won both the Benson and Hedges Cup and the NatWest Bank Trophy in 1990, and he was man of the match in the final of the latter.

DeFreitas announced in April 2005 that he would retire from cricket at the end of that season. This meant that had England not beaten the Australians that summer, there would be no remaining Englishmen in first-class cricket who had played in a victorious Ashes side, but this did not happen. On hearing the news, Mike Gatting, who had captained that 1986/87 team, told the BBC: "He's one of those guys you want in the game. It's sad he's going to retire but he's been good for the game."

Before retiring DeFreitas achieved the milestone of scoring 10,000 first-class runs and taking 1,000 first-class wickets in his career.

== International career ==
Making his Test debut in the 1st Test of the 1986–87 Ashes at Brisbane. He made an immediate impact in an important partnership with Ian Botham. England went onto win the series against Australia, and DeFreitas was also the top wicket taker as England won the World Series Cup later that winter. He would later play in four more Ashes series, but never again finished on the winning side in an Ashes series.

He remained part of England's Test plans until the advent of Dominic Cork in the mid-1990s, but was generally much less successful abroad than at home. His two best Test series were in 1991 against West Indies and, in 1994, against New Zealand, when he took 22 and 21 wickets respectively. DeFreitas was the first victim of Shane Warne's 1994 hat trick at the MCG. His top Test score of 88 was achieved during the same tour, during which he hammered Craig McDermott for 42 runs off three overs with the new ball, helped England to a win against Australia in Adelaide, and earned him the Man of the Match award.

DeFreitas was named as a Wisden Cricketer of the Year in 1992. This followed that 1991 series against the West Indies, when he had taken match figures of 8–93 in England's first victory in a home Test against the West Indies for 22 years (at Leeds), made his first Test half century, and a test at Lord's against Sri Lanka in which he recorded his best figures in a Test match innings, 7-70. He recorded his best match figures in a Test match in 1994, 9–165, against New Zealand (also making 51 not out in the same match at Trent Bridge).

DeFreitas also played in the 1987 Cricket World Cup. During his first match in the tournament against West Indies played in Pakistan, while attempting to bowl DeFreitas had to stop in the middle of his run-up in order to vomit. He had not been feeling well and the searing heat had made the affliction worse. Anxious not to lose his place, he had not mentioned his illness to the captain, preferring to try and see the day through instead. He managed this without compromising his teammates. DeFreitas went onto play for England in the final against Australia, taking England close to victory with some late hitting before falling short.

DeFreitas had the honour of being the 100th player in test cricket to take 100 wickets. He played his 44 Tests over nine years, and was hampered in fulfilling his early promise by injury, inconsistency, and varied selection policies; in 1988, for instance, he was dropped from the England test team three times in a single summer. In one-day internationals, DeFreitas seldom let England down – but bowled more economically than penetratively until his second Australian tour. In the World Series Cup that season, DeFreitas was often punished by the powerful Australian top order particularly Dean Jones. He performed creditably despite a persistent groin strain in the Cricket World Cup of 1992 but form was beginning to desert him by this stage. He was notoriously thrashed all over the ground by Sanath Jayasuriya in the 1996 World Cup quarter final – by no means alone – in a game where England were thrashed and ended up making their tournament exit. As of 2022, DeFreitas remains one of only four England players – along with Botham, Graham Gooch and Allan Lamb – to have played in more than one Cricket World Cup final.

He played his last full international for England, a one-day international, in 1997 against Australia.

== Personal life ==
As well as making irregular television appearances, DeFreitas became a cricket master at Oakham School in January 2009, under the school's director of cricket, Frank Hayes. As of 2009 he taught at Magdalen College School, Oxford.

DeFreitas sought and in October 1995 obtained legal redress when a July 1995 article appearing in the Wisden Cricket Monthly questioned the commitment of players of foreign origin to the England cricket team. DeFreitas, England and then Derbyshire colleague Devon Malcolm, and others, the writer opined, were not "unequivocal Englishmen". According to subsequent recollection this recalled typecasting of Malcolm and Gladstone Small by politician Norman Tebbit in 1990. DeFreitas recalled that the writer "suggested [we] were interlopers. That was so out of order, so wrong". DeFreitas and Malcolm, issued writs for defamation; DeFreitas settled outside of court while Malcolm accepted libel damages through the High Court.

His autobiography, "Daffy: My Life in Cricket", was published on 16 June 2012. DeFreitas is also a fan of English football side Manchester City.
