= Bruce French (cricketer) =

English cricketer

Personal information
- Full name: Bruce Nicholas French
- Born: 13 August 1959 (age 67); Market Warsop, Nottinghamshire, England
- Nickname: Frog
- Batting: Right-handed
- Role: Wicket-keeper
- Relatives: Neil French (brother); Jake Ball (nephew)

International information
- National side: England (1985–1988)
- Test debut (cap 517): 19 June 1986 v India
- Last Test: 3 March 1988 v New Zealand
- ODI debut (cap 80): 27 January 1985 v India
- Last ODI: 19 March 1988 v New Zealand

Domestic team information
- Years: Team
- 1976–1995: Nottinghamshire

Career statistics
Competition	Test	ODI	FC	LA
Matches	16	13	360	296
Runs scored	308	34	7,160	2,026
Batting average	18.11	6.80	18.89	15.00
100s/50s	0/1	0/0	2/25	0/0
Top score	59	9*	123	49
Balls bowled	–	–	90	–
Wickets	–	–	1	–
Bowling average	–	–	70.00	–
5 wickets in innings	–	–	0	–
10 wickets in match	–	–	0	–
Best bowling	–	–	1/37	–
Catches/stumpings	38/1	13/3	817/100	275/36
- Source: CricketArchive, 17 July 2016

Bruce Nicholas French (born 13 August 1959) is a former English cricketer, who played in sixteen Test matches and 13 One Day Internationals for the England cricket team from 1985 to 1988. A wicket-keeper/batsman, French played his first Test against India at Headingley, Leeds in 1986, and his last Test against New Zealand in Wellington in March 1988.

French played his county cricket exclusively for Nottinghamshire. Cricket writer, Colin Bateman, described French as "a wicketkeeper of the highest calibre". His nephew Jake Ball also played test cricket for England.

== Life and career ==
French served as understudy to Paul Downton on two tours, before making his Test debut against India in 1986. He had a run in the side until a finger injury gave Jack Russell his opportunity behind the stumps.

French's best performance with the bat at Test level came against Pakistan in the 1987 Test at Old Trafford, when he scored 59 in a rain-affected drawn match. In his sixteen Test matches, French scored 309 runs at an average of 18.11, took thirty eight catches and made one stumping.

His England Test career was unusual in that not once in his sixteen matches did he finish on the winning side. This was a lean time for a mediocre England team whose star players, David Gower, Ian Botham and Graham Gooch, were either struggling or absent; the majority of the Tests in which French played ended in draws. The only Tests England won during the timeframe of French's Test career were against Australia during the 1986–7 Ashes series, when, because of the poor form of the specialist batsmen in tour matches ahead of the Ashes tests, the selectors decided to drop him for Jack Richards, who had a reputation as a stronger batsman. When recalled for the next two Tests against Pakistan the following summer, he partly answered his critics, making runs as nightwatchman in both games.

He had at least finished on the winning side when England were victorious in the World Series Cup at the end of that tour of Australia. French played in both finals of this tournament against Australia. French was also part of a successful Nottinghamshire county side, which won the County Championship and NatWest Trophy in 1987, French helping Richard Hadlee in a crucial stand of 75 in the final of the latter. He was also part of the sides that won the 1981 County Championship, the 1991 Refuge Assurance League, and the Benson and Hedges Cup in 1989. In the final of the latter he shared another crucial but smaller stand in a successful run chase, this time with Eddie Hemmings.

French had a mixed experience on his tours. These included being bitten by a dog, being hit by a spectator-thrown ball whilst practising, and then knocked down by a car as he arrived at hospital for treatment. French also saved two young girls from drowning while on a Test tour in Pakistan, when he came across them by chance. He also missed a home test in 1987 after contracting chickenpox. He also missed part of a Lord's Test against New Zealand in 1986 after being struck by a delivery from his Nottinghamshire team-mate Hadlee while batting, his place behind the stumps, with the permission of New Zealand captain Jeremy Coney, being taken successively by Bill Athey, Bob Taylor (who briefly thus came out of retirement), and Bobby Parks.

French joined the 1990 rebel tour to South Africa, a decision which confirmed that his test playing days were over. Retrospectively French said of this decision: "They wanted a wicketkeeper. I had been out of the game for a year through injury and Jack Russell had come into the England side. It looked difficult to get back. I thought I would earn more from the tour than playing international cricket."

French enjoys mountaineering, and had a spell coaching wicket-keeping for the England cricket team. He coached Matt Prior, the English wicket-keeper, and has been regarded as an excellent coach of high skills and knowledge.
