= Jack Richards (cricketer, born 1958) =

English cricketer (born 1958)

Personal information
- Full name: Clifton James Richards
- Born: 10 August 1958 (age 68); Penzance, Cornwall, England
- Height: 5 ft 11 in (180 cm)
- Batting: Right-handed
- Bowling: Right-arm medium
- Role: Wicket-keeper

Domestic team information
- Years: Team
- 1976–1988: Surrey
- 1983/84: Orange Free State

Career statistics
Competition	Test	ODI
Matches	8	22
Runs scored	285	154
Batting average	21.92	11.84
100s/50s	1/0	0/1
Top score	133	50
Catches/stumpings	20/1	16/1
- Source: CricInfo, 1 January 2006

Clifton James Richards (born 10 August 1958) is an English former first-class cricketer, who played in eight Tests and 22 ODIs for England from 1981 to 1988. He was a wicket-keeper and a useful lower-middle order batsman, who made 133 for England against Australia at the WACA, Perth in 1987.

The cricket correspondent Colin Bateman remarked, "England's most gifted wicketkeeper-batsman since Alan Knott. Always competitive, often outspoken and sometimes disruptive, Richards was alert and agile with the gloves although prone to the odd lapse".

== Life and career ==
Richards was born in Cornwall, learning his cricket at Penzance.

He was a neat and efficient wicketkeeper, taller than most at 5' 11", whose excellent footwork and agility' allied to his effective middle-order batting, made him a genuine England contender. His first tour for England was to India and Sri Lanka as Bob Taylor's understudy in 1981–82. In 1986, when topping 1000 runs in the summer, he played two ODIs against New Zealand.

That winter he was picked to tour Australia as Bruce French's deputy. Pressed into action at Brisbane in an England side bereft of runs, he did enough to secure his place (despite a duck in his only innings). The tour was a success, with England winning the Ashes under Mike Gatting, and Richards to the fore. In his second Test, at Perth, he hammered 133 in exactly four hours, and ended the series with 264 runs at 37.71. Less obtrusively he also enjoyed success in the series behind the stumps, taking 15 catches and 1 stumping, including five catches in the first innings as England clinched the Ashes at Melbourne. After the test series he was also part of the England team which won the Benson & Hedges one-day challenge. Despite losing his place at the end of that tour to French, he was also part of the England team that won the one-day Sharjah cup that spring. He played in the ODIs against Pakistan at the start of 1987, although the selectors preferred French for the Test matches that summer, Richards only playing in the third Test at Leeds when French was unavailable.

Given that the selectors had up to this point favoured him for one-day internationals, of which he had played 21 compared to 6 Tests, he might have been expecting to appear in the 1987 ICC Cricket World Cup that autumn. But the selectors instead recalled Paul Downton.

Richards, as French's No. 2, was selected for the Australian and New Zealand legs of a long winter], but would play only one more one-day international, at Melbourne, the scene of a previous triumph. This time he finished on the losing side.

Richards made two more Test appearances the following summer against the West Indies, but England lost both matches and he failed to make an impact with his batting, previously his strength. Despite a record-breaking benefit at Surrey, he retired even though he was just 30 at the time.

After quitting professional cricket, Richards went to work in Rotterdam as an operations manager at the Van Weelde international shipping company, owned and run by former captain of the Dutch national cricket team Robert van Weelde. He now lives in Belgium with his Dutch wife, running a successful Rotterdam shipping firm in neighbouring Holland and director of an international recruitment and crewing agency.

He was the manager of the Belgian Under-16s rugby union team, and still is the president of the Antwerp Cricket Club. He was also the head coach for the Belgium national cricket team.
