= Tim Zoehrer =

Australian cricketer

Personal information
- Born: 25 September 1961 (age 65)
- Batting: Right-handed
- Bowling: Legbreak googly

International information
- National side: Australia (1986–1994)
- Test debut (cap 337): 21 February 1986 v New Zealand
- Last Test: 10 January 1987 v England
- ODI debut (cap 93): 05 February 1986 v India
- Last ODI: 16 January 1994 v South Africa

Domestic team information
- Years: Team
- 1980/81–1993/94: Western Australia

Career statistics
Competition	Test	ODI
Matches	10	22
Runs scored	246	130
Batting average	20.50	10.83
100s/50s	0/1	0/1
Top score	52*	50
Catches/stumpings	18/1	21/2
- Source: Cricinfo, 12 December 2005

Timothy Joseph Zoehrer (born 25 September 1961) is a former Australian cricket player. He played as a wicket-keeper and is of Austrian descent.

He played ten Test matches between 1986 and 1987, touring New Zealand and India. He also played 22 One Day Internationals

== Early career ==
He began his career in the 1980–81 season with Western Australia in the Sheffield Shield as an understudy to Rod Marsh.

Zoehrer made his first class debut for Western Australia in November 1980, aged 19 years old, in a game against the touring India side.

Rod Marsh was the first choice Australian keeper but Zoehrer was able to play for his state when Marsh was on international duty. He became a state regular following Marsh's retirement in 1984.

After Marsh's retirement he became the number one state keeper and eventually the Australian Test keeper.

== International wicket-keeper ==
In late January 1986 Zoehrer was picked as Australia's wicketkeeper for the 1986 tour of New Zealand, replacing Wayne Phillips, who continued to play as batter. Zoehrer had played 29 first class games. He soon made his international debut for Australia in an ODI against India in February 1986, scoring 11 runs (the amount by which Australia won the game).

Zoehrer kept in all three tests in New Zealand, scoring 18 in the first, 30 and 13 in the second, and 9 and 1 in the third, which Australia lost. He scored 71 in a tour game. During the third test, Zoehrer fell injured with an eye infection during New Zealand's second innings and Phillips took over as keeper. He flew home early to treat the infection and Phillips took over for the ODIs.

Zoehrer recovered and was selected as Australia's keeper on the 1986 tour to Sharjah and the 1986 tour of India, although Australia also selected a back up, Greg Dyer. Zoehrer scored 52 in the second test.

=== 1986-87 season including The Ashes ===
Zoehrer played in four tests during the 1986-87 Ashes, missing the third test due to injury. He was a regular in Australia's ODI team.

Chris Broad, who batted for England that summer, later recalled "Tim Zoehrer did not bother us on the field: we would laugh at his histrionics as he tried to cover up his inadequacies behind the stumps with a load of bluster. He bothered Greg Matthews far more than us: time and again Greg would wander away, muttering about Zoehrer’s efforts. Greg thought that his New South Wales colleague Greg Dyer should be playing and he used to give Zoehrer some terrible volleys."

Frances Edmonds, wife of Phil Edmonds who also played for England, wrote, Zoehrer "has a reputation on the circuit for giving it quite a touch of the verbals, or sledging," although she says there was a good natured competition between her husband and Zoehrer where both would send each other limericks critical of the other.

Zoehrer won Man of the Match scoring 50 in an ODI against the West Indies, batting as opener.

Zoehrer's attitude on the field saw Border defend him publicly. Later on however Border would write, "Tim might do well to improve his attitude to the game. There is the suspicion that he doesn’t do enough work in practice. The ‘greats’ I’ve watched like Knott and Marsh both worked a great deal on their skills... Tim Zoehrer seems to slacken off to a certain extent. He has been given a fantastic opportunity, keeping wicket for his country, and I'd like to see him doing a little more work."

Zoehrer was selected in the squad to tour Sharjah in 1987. However he was dropped in favour of Greg Dyer for the 1987 World Cup, although he was listed as a reserve player. David Gower reflected, " Bobby Simpson and Allan Border decided that a certain type of character was required to play for Australia, hence the more flamboyant and slightly rebellious people like Greg Ritchie, Tim Zoehrer, Craig McDermott and Greg Matthews all got thrown out."

=== Back up wicket-keeper ===
Zoehrer claims he was replaced as first-choice keeper after a personality clash with Australian coach and newly appointed selector, Bob Simpson. He was replaced firstly by Greg Dyer and then Ian Healy. Zoehrer did, though, tour England twice, in 1989 and 1993, as Healy's deputy. Zoehrer was selected as a reserve for the 1987 Cricket World Cup. He played his final One Day International in 1994, at Perth vs South Africa, seven years after his previous appearance again as a replacement for a rested Healy.

== Western Australia career ==
Zoehrer was a successful and popular keeper for Western Australia with a state record of 360 dismissals and also took 38 first-class wickets with his leg break bowling. In both of his tours of England he topped the first class bowling averages for the Australians on tour, taking 1 wicket for 9 runs in 1989 and 12 wickets at an average of 20.8 in 1993. However he never bowled at Test or One Day International level. He was controversially replaced by former NSW's Adam Gilchrist at the beginning of the 1994–95 season and never played first class or list-A cricket again.

Zoehrer later played and coached cricket in the Netherlands and wrote an autobiography, "The Gloves Are Off". In it he claimed that he was dropped from the Australian team in Sharjah in 1987 after abusing Bob Simpson in front of the rest of the team; Zoehrer thought Simpson had accused him of stealing a bottle of whiskey:

I gave Simpson the biggest mouthful of abuse ever given by a player to an Australian official. I called him everything from being two-faced to yellow-bellied.... I had been stewing all day over being branded a thief. I demanded Simpson be fined for not having the balls to ask me to my face whether I stole the Scotch, instead of asking my team-mates if it was true. You could have heard a pin drop.

In the book Zoehrer also claimed he had a physical altercation with Damien Martyn, after Martyn abused Zoehrer's wife Michelle. "I saw red, grabbed Martyn by the throat and was about to hit him when [Tom] Moody grabbed my arm and pulled me away," wrote Zoehrer. "Martyn had no reason to act the way he did because Michelle had never done anything to offend him."

== Australian rules football career ==
Zoehrer played professional Australian rules football with Western Australian Football League (WAFL) club East Fremantle in 1982.
