= Greg Matthews =

Australian cricketer

Personal information
- Full name: Gregory Richard John Matthews
- Born: 15 December 1959 (age 66); Newcastle, New South Wales, Australia
- Nickname: Mo, Moey
- Height: 180 cm (5 ft 11 in)
- Batting: Left-handed
- Bowling: Right-arm off-spinner
- Role: Batting all rounder

International information
- National side: Australia
- Test debut (cap 322): 26 December 1983 v Pakistan
- Last Test: 6 January 1993 v West Indies
- ODI debut (cap 78): 8 January 1984 v West Indies
- Last ODI: 18 January 1993 v West Indies

Domestic team information
- Years: Team
- 1982/83–1997/98: New South Wales

Career statistics
Competition	Test	ODI	FC	LA
Matches	33	59	190	122
Runs scored	1,849	619	8,872	1,366
Batting average	41.08	16.72	38.91	18.71
100s/50s	4/12	0/1	13/49	0/3
Top score	130	54	184	61*
Balls bowled	6,271	2,808	39,103	5,584
Wickets	61	57	516	119
Bowling average	48.22	35.15	31.80	31.85
5 wickets in innings	2	0	22	2
10 wickets in match	1	0	5	0
Best bowling	5/103	3/27	8/52	4/22
Catches/stumpings	17/–	23/–	149/0	42/0
- Source: CricketArchive, 6 April 2010

Gregory Richard John Matthews (born 15 December 1959) is a New South Wales and Australian former cricket all rounder (off-spin bowler and left-handed batsman). He was popular with fans as "a tough, useful, determined little cricketer; a steady, flat, off-spin bowler; a staunch, correct left-hand bat; and a brilliant fielder.... also a cocky, slightly zany character."

When Australian cricket was in the doldrums in the 1980s "his dashing batsmanship and growing ability as a spin bowler suddenly elevated Matthews to a position of a national hero". He made centuries in times of crisis against New Zealand and India in 1985–86, took ten wickets in the Tied Test at Madras and batted well against England in 1986–87.

Thereafter his career declined as the "effervescent and unorthodox" Matthews did not fit in with the rest of the Australian Test team. As Australia rose to dominance in the 1990s Matthews proved to be "not good enough in either of the game's main departments to make a lasting impact as a Test all-rounder" and despite a century against England in 1990–91 he played only irregularly and was finally dropped in 1993. He continued to play with success for New South Wales until he retired in 1997.

== Early life ==
During his youth Matthews attended Ermington Public School and played for the Rydalmere Cricket Club, where he won the Under 11s Northern Districts Cricket Association Cricketer of the Year Award in 1970–71 and 1971–72. Coach Gordon Nolan was crucial to his early development.

Prior to his cricket career taking off, Matthews played Colts (under 20s) Rugby for the Eastwood Rugby Club and was a pro for the Cumbrian side Whitehaven Cricket Club for three seasons, starring in the club's 1981 league championship victory. At the conclusion of a successful season for Eastwood there was speculation that cricket may be put aside for Rugby, but he opted to play cricket.

=== 1982/83: State Selection ===
Matthews made his first-class debut over the 1982–83 summer. Scoring 123 and taking 3–48 for the state colts against Queensland saw him selected in the New South Wales side to play Western Australia in November 1982, replacing John Dyson, who was on test duty.

He took 3–41 for NSW in a day-night game against a touring New Zealand side.

Some enterprising runs from Matthews in a game against Queensland helped NSW get in the Sheffield Shield final. Matthews played in the final, won by NSW—their first Sheffield Shield in 17 years.

He spent the 1983 winter playing club cricket in England.

=== 1983/84: National Selection ===
Matthews was made 12th man for NSW's first game of the 1983–84 season—a delayed McDonald's Cup one day final. However, poor bowling by Murray Bennett in that game saw Matthews take Bennett's place.

He took three wickets in a shield game against WA, then scored 86 with 13 boundaries against the touring Pakistan side. He injured his hand while fielding in a game against Victoria. However, Matthews was then picked to play in the Australian team against Pakistan. He was chosen along with state teammate Murray Bennett.

Matthews had recently applied to go on the dole but was ruled out on a technicality when it was discovered that he was playing in a McDonald's Cup match that week. "I don't care what money I get, man", Matthews said. "It's the buzz of playing for Australia that's got me. I'm not worried about how much they pay ... I'd do it all for nothing just to wear that green cap." However, there was some sad news for Matthews. "My old coach from the Rydalmere junior days, Gordon Nolan, is dead and I owe so much to him that I wish I could have contacted him this morning as both our dreams came true."

Matthews was also picked to play in the Prime Ministers XI.

== Early Test Career ==
Early in his cricketing career Matthews was regarded "as a bowler who fielded energetically and could bat a bit" and a "complete extrovert, dressing to shock". He was usually referred to as Greg, but his teammates nicknamed him 'Mo', "short for 'misère', which he always called when we played five hundred". Matthews enjoyed clubbing and ignored the midnight curfew imposed by New South Wales fast bowler Geoff Lawson as "these were his socialising hours and the time he came to life", and his mantra was "'live each day as if it's your last'".

Matthews took 2/95 and 2/48 in his first test match, running out Zaheer Abbas in the first innings and bowling him in the second. With the bat he made 75, joining Graham Yallop (268) on 354/7 and adding 185 together for the eighth wicket.

Australian captain Kim Hughes said he "thought that Matthews's innings was a remarkable performance as he is fiercely competitive which is typically Australian. His batting was great and his overall performance was outstanding." However, there was controversy when Matthews was dismissed; he was given out lbw by umpire Tony Crafter and when he walked off he indicated that he thought the ball had come off his bat. (Matthews later apologised to the umpire for the very public display of dissent.)

The Test was drawn and Matthews was kept for the Fifth Test, preferred to Murray Bennett as the spinner. He was Greg Chappell's batting partner when he was dismissed for 182 in his final Test innings. Chappell later said Matthews was the strangest cricketer he ever played with. "He came from a different background, spoke a different language, a surfie's language", recalled Chappell. "'Bro', 'cool' being a major part of his language. He didn't meet the stereotype of what an Australian cricketer looked like, spoke like, sounded like. And yet he had a love of the game that was as strong as anyone I ever played with or against."

Matthews' performance in the tests impressed captain Kim Hughes. "He's very competitive, wants to bowl and bat", Hughes said. "If we had 12 players with the same approach it would be great."

Matthews was picked to play in Australia's one day team for the World Series Cricket competition that summer and was praised for his fielding, but failed to perform with the bat and ball and was dropped after two games.

Matthews responded with a good performance against Tasmania in the Sheffield Shield.

=== 1983/84 Tour of West Indies ===
Matthews was selected as one of two spinners on the 1983–84 tour to the West Indies.

He played in two early tour games but was out-bowled by the other spinner Tom Hogan who was preferred in the first four tests.

Matthews bowled well against Barbados and scored 54 against Windward Islands as an opener.

Australia lost the third and fourth tests. Matthews was picked in the fifth test.

He was a makeshift opener in the second innings as Steve Smith was injured. Kim Hughes seemed reluctant to use Matthews as a bowler in a game which Australia lost.

Matthews was omitted from the one day squad to tour India in 1984 and he was not offered a contract from the ACB for the following summer.

=== 1984/85 Summer ===
Matthews was unable to force his way back into a test team for the first three tests against the West Indies. But 88 against Queensland helped see him selected in the side for the 4th test.

Matthews dismissed Viv Richards (208) and Clive Lloyd (91) with his 2/67 in a draw that ended their 11 match winning streak.

He was not one of the three spinners chosen for the Fifth Test on his home ground at Sydney where Australia won by an innings.

However, Matthews finished the summer strongly in the Sheffield Shield. He scored 87 and took 5–32 against Queensland, then scored his maiden century, 103 against Victoria. When asked about a possible return to the Australian side, Matthews said, "I think as little as possible about it. I used to lie awake thinking about it a lot but I don't want the disappointment of not going and besides, NSW has a lot to do."

Matthews was told he was recalled to the Australian side to tour Sharjah for a one-day tournament, then took part in the Sheffield Shield final, where NSW beat Qld by one wicket. He capped off the season with news he had been picked in the squad to tour England for the 1985 Ashes. "I just didn't think I would make it", said a delighted Matthews.

=== 1985 Sharjah Tour ===
Matthews toured Sharjah with the Australian one day team.

=== 1985 Ashes ===
Matthews then went to England in 1985, where he proved popular in the county matches. Australia seemed determined to play an all rounder and Matthews was in competition with Simon O'Donnell.

In the One Day Internationals Matthews batted at number eight and hit the winning runs at Old Trafford (22 not out) and Lord's (29 not out) as Australia won the Texaco Trophy 2–1.

In the Third Test at Trent Bridge he mixed with the crowd and read a newspaper in the stands; "Matthews of the petit-punk hair and puppet movements...has a happy knack of winding up crowds".

Matthews produced some solid batting performances in the county games. He was selected in the Fourth Test because Graeme Wood was injured and again volunteered to open the innings, but also ran out Allan Lamb from extra cover.

At the end of the tour Matthews had now played in five Test matches, but had only made 139 runs (19.85) and taken 7 wickets (45.28) and was far from establishing his place in the Australia team.

Allan Border said "Greg never really came on as much as we expected. But he's still young and has time on his side."

== Breakthrough as International Cricketer: Australia vs New Zealand 1985–86 ==
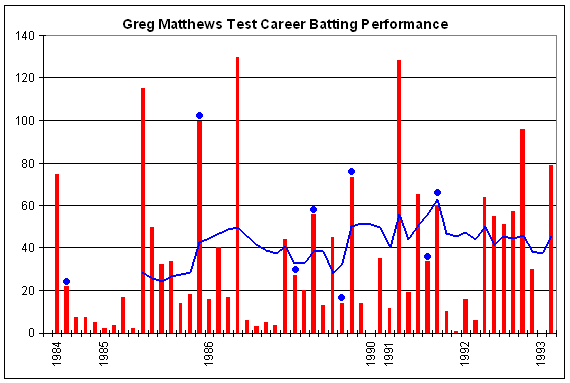
Greg Matthews' Test career batting performance.

Greg Matthews joined me at the wicket to start an innings which was to 'make' him as a Test cricketer...I think we had all regarded him as a bowler who fielded energetically and could bat a bit. We'd misjudged him, and that century put the true all-rounder stamp on him.

Allan Border

Matthews started the 1985–86 summer well with 184 against Tasmania. He then took 5–22 against Victoria.

"I'm a little older now, I'm more hungry for success and have a little more experience on my side in how I conduct myself", he said.

Matthews was picked to play the First Test against New Zealand at the Woolloongabba. The selection choice came down to Matthews and Simon O'Donnell—Matthews was picked, with O'Donnell 12th man.

This test saw Australia lose their third Test in a row by an innings as Richard Hadlee took 15/123. Matthews was Australian's best bowler (3/110) and joined the Australian captain Allan Border at 67/5 in the second innings with 307 runs required to make New Zealand bat again. He made his first Test century—115 off 229 balls with 10 fours and a six—and most of the 197 runs added with Border (152), a record sixth wicket stand for Australia against New Zealand.

"I was really disappointed at getting out", he said. "I felt as if I'd let the team down with just four overs to go and I'd wanted to see it through. Allan and I were confident we could play through tomorrow. We certainly felt that we could save the game."

This was backed up with 111 for NSW against New Zealand then 50 and 32 in the Second Test at Sydney, which Australia won by 4 wickets.

In the third test he scored 34 and 14 as Australia lost. He was second in the Australian series batting averages after the captain with 247 runs (41.16).

Allan Border was greatly pleased with Matthews performances that summer saying "Once he didn't feel part of the team, he fell he was a different sort of a character and others reacted that way to him. Now he feels accepted – his idiosyncrasies are not him being smart, we have found, and he now feels part of us."

== Australia vs India 1985–86 ==
New Zealand was only the third country to beat Australia at home after England and the West Indies and India looked set to become the fourth. They made scores of 520, 445, 59/2 and 600/4 in the Tests and Matthews suffered with the other Australian bowlers, taking only two wickets (118.00) in the series.

In the Second Test at Melbourne he came in at 109/5 and made 100 not out adding 46 for the last wicket with his New South Wales teammate Dave Gilbert (4)—who came in when Matthews was 59—to hoist the Australian total up to 262. Lacklustre Indian batting and late rain saved the match after Allan Border (163) and Gilbert (10 not out) made another rear-guard action in the second innings. Though they outplayed Australia in all three Tests this was the nearest India came to winning a Test and the series.

== Benson and Hedges World Series Cup 1985–86 ==
After the two Test series there was a triangular World Series Cup One Day series between Australia, New Zealand and India, who were the current World Champions, and Australia and India made it into the best out of three finals. Matthews was part of the Australian squad throughout the summer.

Matthews played a key role in several Australian victories including 46 in a game against India and 1–27 against New Zealand.

In the First WSC Final Matthews was run out for 7 in Australia's 170/8, but returned an economical 9–0–27–3 to bowl out India for 159 to win by 11 runs.

"Matthews is a confidence player, never says die and has developed tremendously as a player", Border said after the game. "I ask special players their opinions as the game progresses, but would never have thought of confiding in Matthews a short time ago."

In the Second WSC Final he took 10–0–37–2 to restrict India to 187 and saw Australia win the game by 7 wickets and the Finals 2–0 without the need for a third game. Matthews was voted Player of the Finals and it was a considerable boost to Australian confidence as the team completed a lap of honour round the Melbourne Cricket Ground.

Matthews was selected on Australia's tours of New Zealand and Sharjah. For the latter he was to be one of Australia's selectors, a sign of how integral he had become.

"National selector – that's a big wrap, man", he said at the time. "It's a bit of added responsibility and I hope that I can handle it. I'm really happy that the people who are virtually my employers think I can handle the extra responsibility that goes with being a selector."

== New Zealand vs Australia 1985–86 ==
Australia toured New Zealand in 1985–86 and lost their second series against them in the same season despite several improvements.

When they arrived Matthews said "Greg Matthews had a fantastic summer. He kept things going in the field, never said die and was full of enthusiasm. He certainly helped me: he has been a big plus for Australia."

Matthews began the tour well with 57 in a tour game. He was still nursing a shoulder injury from the WSC series but was picked in the first test team. "He is just too important to leave out", said Border.

In the First Test, Matthews (130) came in at 166/4 and added 213 for the fifth wicket with Greg Ritchie (92), a record for Australia vs New Zealand and Matthews' highest Test score. Matthews had eggs pelted at him during his innings.

Rain ensured a draw in both the first two Tests and in the Second Matthews had the unusual bowling analysis of 3–3–0–1 when he caught and bowled Bruce Edgar in New Zealand's second innings of 16/1.

Matthews scored 66 in a one-day game in Napier.

Australia lost the Third Test when they collapsed to 103 in the second innings and lost by 8 wickets. Matthews had taken his then best Test bowling of 4/61, dismissing Bruce Edgar (24), Ken Rutherford (0) and Martin Crowe (0) with the score on 73.

This gave him 8 wickets (29.50), his best series bowling so far, but he had taken only 23 wickets (43.69) in 14 Tests to add to his 725 runs (32.95).

The Australian captain Allan Border threatened to resign if Australia did not win the four game One Day International series and then saw New Zealand go 2–0 up. Fortunately Australia won the last two games and Matthews was Man of the Match in the Fourth ODI at Eden Park, where he made 54, took 9–1–33–3 and held onto three catches in Australia's 44-run win. This allowed Border to announce that the team had improved enough for him not to resign, much to the advantage of Australian cricket.

Throughout the series, Matthews was constantly booed by the crowd. "I suppose I am paying the price for my style of individuality after they watched me on TV in the series at home", he said.

"He gives everything, he is flamboyant but not a ratbag", said Border. "I know Matthews is disappointed—he hasn't enjoyed the tour, he has been given a hard time by some elements here. He likes meeting people but has been prevented from mingling socially."

"If he finds the crowd harsh here then he must remember he asked for it." said Jeremy Coney. "But crowds just can't be neutral about him", he said. Some applaud his behaviour and others didn't. His behaviour polarises the crowds here and he must expect some sort of reaction from those who don't like it. I just feel neutral about him—when he is batting I want to get rid of him, when he is bowling I want to hit him around the park."

=== 1986 Sharjah Tour ===
Matthews position in the side was confirmed when he took part in the short one day tournament in Sharjah. Matthews was the third selector.

There was more good news for Matthews when he returned home: he won NSW Cricketer of the Year.

== India vs Australia 1986–87 and The Second Tied Test ==
Australia toured India at the start of the 1986–87 season. He and Ray Bright were the only spinners.

Matthews had an excellent tour. He took five wickets in the first tour game, and made 99 against Bombay.

He played the First Test at Madras, a huge concrete bowl which radiated the intense heat, which rose to 50 °C with 90% humidity. Allan Border won the toss and Australia declared on 574/7 on the third day when Matthews was out for 44. In the Indian innings he took 5/103, his first five-wicket haul in Test cricket and best Test figures, as he dismissed Sunil Gavaskar (caught and bowled), Krishnamachari Srikkanth, Ravi Shastri, Chandrakant Pandit and Kapil Dev as India were bowled out for 397. Australia batted again and Matthews made 27 not out in Australia's 170/5, which set India 348 runs to win on the last day. Matthews dismissed Srikkanth, Mohinder Amarnath and Pandit as India collapsed from 200/2 to 291/6. His 40th over was the last that could be played in the match, bowling to Ravi Shastri, with India's last man Maninder Singh at the bowler's end. India needed four runs to win from the 6-ball over with only one wicket remaining;

- 1st ball: To Shastri: no run. Four runs required off five balls.
- 2nd ball: Shastri took two runs, retaining the strike. Two runs required off four balls.
- 3rd ball: Shastri pushed the ball to square leg for a single. The scores are now tied, with one run required for victory, but the Indian number 11 was now on strike.
- 4th ball: To Singh: no run. One run required off two balls.
- 5th ball: The ball hit Singh on his back leg and umpire Vikram Raju gives him out leg before wicket after a loud appeal.

India were all out for 347, Matthews having taken 5/146 (10/249 in the match) in the second Second Tied Test in cricket history. It was the second and last time that he would take five wickets in a Test innings and the only time that he took ten wickets in a Test match. Dean Jones (210) and Kapil Dev (119) were each selected as a 'man of the match'. Greg Matthews was later made 'all-rounder of the match'.

Matthews later reflected, "It was an incredible relief that we didn't lose because we certainly didn't deserve to. Obviously it was an emotional high that's very hard to express in words. But I wouldn't say it was the high point of my career, simply because we didn't win.

The Second Test began with three days of rain and Matthews did not bat or bowl.

The Third Test was a draw, Matthews taking 4/158 to dismiss Gavaskar, Srikkanth, Amarnath and Mohammad Azharuddin in India's only innings. He took 14 wickets (29.07) and made 91 runs (45.50) in the series, his most successful with the ball.

== Australia vs England 1986–87 ==
Matthews returned to Australia as with improved all-rounder credentials and the Test team's first choice spinner. Despite high hopes of regaining The Ashes against an England team that "can't bat, can't bowl and can't field" Australia found itself in trouble again. Allan Border won the toss at the Gabba put England in to bat and watched them make 456. Greg Matthews was the most senior of bowlers, and had played as many Tests (17) as the others combined; Bruce Reid (8), Steve Waugh (8), Merv Hughes (1) and Chris Matthews (0). Still, he made a gritty 56 not out in the first innings, but Australia could not avoid the follow-on and lost by 7 wickets.

In the Second Test at the WACA England made 592/7 declared and Matthews batted for 190 minutes for his 45 and 14 not out to see out the draw. There was some talk Matthews would become 12th man for the third test but he kept his place.

The Third Test at Adelaide finally saw Australia on top, but Border declared their innings on 514/5 with Matthews on 73 not out and Waugh on 79 not out after complaining about their slow scoring rate. In any case England had no trouble drawing the match on a slow, flat wicket, though Matthews did bowl the England captain Mike Gatting for a first ball duck.

The Fourth Test at Melbourne was a debacle as the Australian batsmen threw their wickets away to Ian Botham (5/41) and Gladstone Small (5/48) and losing inside three days; Matthews made 14 and 0. Although he had made 217 runs (53.75) Matthews had taken only two wickets (147.50) and could hardly justify his place in the bowling line up. Neil Harvey wrote in a column that "If [the selectors] ever pick Greg Matthews again the game is not fair. Matthews shouldn't have been in the side in Adelaide or Melbourne and that was proved when his captain didn't ask him to bowl a single over last Friday and Saturday. His appointment in the fourth Test ahead of Greg Ritchie was a disgraceful selection. He's got to be dropped from the Sydney Test".

He only played one game in the Benson and Hedges One Day Challenge. With The Ashes out of reach the selectors dropped David Boon and Craig McDermott for the Fifth Test, and made Matthews 12th man. The test was won thanks to the debutant spinner Peter Taylor and Peter Sleep.

Matthews did keep his place in the Australian one day squad. Highlights of the summer included 3–32 against the West Indies, 2–24 against England and 3–27 against England. Allan Border made a point of praising Matthews for his bowling in the one day matches at the end of the summer.

This ensured Matthew's selection on another short tour to Sharjah to play one day games against India, England and Pakistan. He and Peter Taylor would be the spinners. Matthews ended the Australian summer with a century for NSW against Victoria.

Around this time Matthews revealed he turned down two approaches to tour South Africa despite being offered $200,000 because "I didn't think $200,000 would make me happy and I had other things in life to do." He defended his former teammates who had decided to go and opposed the sporting boycott.

=== 1987 Tour to Sharjah ===
The tour did not go well for Matthews who was fined $1,000 for disciplinary reasons. He was dropped from the squad to go to India and Pakistan for the 1987 World Cup in favour of Tim May, in what was described as "a shock omission".

It was later revealed Matthews had an off-field argument over a barbecued steak in Sharjah and was fined $1,000 by Ian McDonald and Bobby Simpson. Steve Waugh thought he "was being punished largely for previous infractions and perceived attitude problems ... and straight away you could sense that a couple of guys felt their careers might be over". Bobby Simpson was Matthews' personal manager and the Australian coach and though he had been supportive in his early career, but now wanted a more disciplined team and Matthews did not fit in.

Instead of playing in the World Cup, Matthews went to Zimbabwe with New South Wales. He then represented Australia in the World All-Rounders Cricket Championship.

== Test Exile:1987–1990 ==
Matthews would remain out of favour with the Australian Test selectors for four years. Despite his 10-wicket haul in the Tied Test his bowling was not of Test standard and his batting average 36.82 was not enough to keep him in the team by itself when David Boon, Allan Border, Dean Jones and Steve Waugh were occupying the middle order.

=== 1987–88 ===
Matthews performed strongly for New South Wales over the 1987–88 season, including a career best 6–97 with the ball against Victoria. However, Australian selectors preferred Peter Taylor, Tim May and Peter Sleep for their spin options.

Matthews was selected in the Prime Ministers XI to play the touring New Zealand side.

=== 1988–89: One Day Recall ===
Matthews began the 1988–89 domestic summer strongly and there was some talk he would be able to get back in the test team.

He was recalled to the Australian one day team for the WSC finals series in 1988–89, as a third spinner. However, he bowled poorly, going for 0–62 off 7 overs. "I felt sorry for him in a lot of ways", said Allan Border, "because I gave him a pretty tough task, bowling in that first 15 overs, and then he had to bowl towards the end when their guys were wacking out."

Matthews was overlooked for the 1989 Ashes in favor of Tim May and Trevor Hohns. However, when May fell injured, Matthews was picked in an Australian one day squad to tour India. "I am just glad to be part of the scene again", he said. "I'm stoked."

=== 1989–90 ===
Matthews struggled in the early part of the 1989–90 season and was made 12th man for NSW for some games. He eventually worked his way back into the side and had a strong season, highlights including 10–76 against Tasmania. His excellent bowling in the Sheffield Shield final against Queensland helped New South Wales to victory. "It's always nice to take wickets, the seven against Tasmania was a career best and a big turn on, and five in the final is a big turn on also", said Matthews. "They are all important."

== Australia vs England 1990–91: Test recall ==
Matthews continued to play well for New South Wales, and his 5–56 against Tasmania was his fourth five-wicket haul in five games.

=== Test recall ===
He was picked in an Australian XI to play the touring English in Hobart then was picked in the squad for the first test.

Peter Taylor had not proved to be a long-term success and Matthews was the only Australian spinner in the side, apart from Allan Border. There was some talk Matthews would be made 12th man but Border favoured a spinner.

"I think the best balance is to play a spinner, which means that one of the quickies would have to miss out", Border said, adding that he was particularly impressed by Matthews' bowling in the Sheffield Shield final the previous summer. "He was a class above any one else I've faced for a long, long time – and that's anyone in the world."

He made 35 batting at number seven and took 1/30, but Australia won by eight wickets.

He was omitted in favour of Peter Taylor for the one day team. However, when Taylor fell injured Matthews was called up in his place and played a number of games. Highlights included 3–54 against England. He was eventually dropped from the one day team when Taylor got better.

Matthews kept his place in the test side. He took 3/40 in the Second Test at Melbourne and 2/26 in the Third Test at Sydney, where he also hit 128 with 17 boundaries to lift Australia from 292/5 to 512/9.

He was overlooked for Peter Taylor in Australia's one day side. However, he took six wickets for New South Wales against England.

In the Fourth Test at Adelaide he made 65 and 34 not out and 60 not out at Perth in the Fifth.

Australia won the series 3–0 and Matthews made 353 runs (70.60), his best Test series with the bat, though he only took 7 wickets (60.28). This effort earned Matthews selection on the 1991 tour of the West Indies.

He was Australia's most successful spin bowler that summer.

== 1990–91 West Indies ==
Matthews began the West Indies tour well with 95 not out and 4–57 against Jamaica.

However, he failed to take any wickets in the first test and Allan Border began to think about replacing him with Steve Waugh.

"If you are going to play a bowler you don't think is going to take any wickets, what's the point?" asked Border. "You might as well go the other way and play Steve Waugh because he's more likely to get a wicket or two. Greg took seven wickets at home and two or three of them came in the second innings in Sydney, when England was slogging. In the first innings, when we wanted to bowl them out, Greg couldn't. It's been a while since our spinner has really played a part in a Test match."

Matthews was picked in the second test but was out-bowled by Allan Border.

"Greg can be a bit too attacking for his own good", Border said. "He tends to toss the ball up a bit too much for this sort of wicket. Every time he threw the ball up, it disappeared, either along the ground or over the top. That's why he tends to go for more runs than he should.... Next time he gets into this situation, he should think of just trying to bowl maidens and letting them have a crack. On this sort of wicket, you've got to be firing in your stock ball and to let the batsman come at you a bit more."

Since returning to the test team in early November, Matthews had taken nine wickets at more than 76 runs a piece while conceding 690 runs.

"The way they've treated Greg, you wonder if he's going to get any wickets and maybe it's time to try Peter", said Border.

Matthews was dropped for the rest of the tests. Steve Waugh played in two and Peter Taylor in the fifth.

In addition to this, Matthews encountered embarrassment due to his association with the writer, Roland Fishman. Fishman had written a biography of Matthews in 1986 and accompanied him on the West Indies tour to write a book, Calypso Cricket. The result was highly controversial, speaking about previously taboo items such as the sex lives of players.

"I feel devastated", said Matthews. "He talks about loyalty and friendship to me." Matthews said the author had gone "behind his back" and had written an exaggerated account: "What price loyalty and friend ship? I trusted him because he is a friend of mine. I feel betrayed."

== 1991–92 series ==
At the beginning of the 1991–92 series, Matthews said he thought he and Peter Taylor were the top spinners in Australia.

"I would like to think I still stand in the top two at worst", he said. "There was only Peter and myself in Adelaide as far as slow bowlers were concerned and we were the only two that went to the West Indies. Although I did not get a lot of wickets in the series last year, I like to think I contributed with bat and ball. I didn't have a lot of opportunities in the West Indies, which was a bummer. With the start of the new season, that's all gone. We are probably both on level terms and I guess whoever performs the best will be given the first opportunity."

Matthews scored some useful runs in the FAI Cup Final, with NSW beating WA. He was fined $5,000 for excessive appealing during a Shield game against WA.

Matthews scored 139 against Victoria, one of his best ever innings with the bat. He took four wickets in the same game. NSW coach Steve Rixon said Matthews "is the pick of the bunch at the moment ... he is the main man as far as spin bowlers go."

However, the selectors preferred Peter Taylor and Shane Warne for the tests.

Matthews domestic form was excellent. In one game against Queensland he made 85 not out and 67 not out and took 6–63 and 5–70, making him only the seventh player to take more than ten wickets and score more than 100 runs in a Shield game. He was included in the initial 20-man squad for the 1992 World Cup. He took 5–61 against South Australia, 6–89 against Tasmania, and ten wickets against WA.

"Greg's spin bowling has been outstanding this season", said NSW captain Geoff Lawson. "Greg hasn't had that many bats so his 500-odd runs could easily have been 700 in the season. It is a surprise that he hasn't played for Australia because he has clearly been the best all-rounder around and his catching has been superb as well."

He was the first Australian player that century to score over 500 runs and take more than 50 wickets in one Sheffield Shield season. These efforts saw him voted NSW Cricketer of the year and earned him selection on the 13-man Australian squad to tour Sri Lanka in 1992.

"I have always believed I have been a good ambassador for Australia—that's what I enjoy most about touring—representing my country at the highest level", Matthews said. "There has never been a time in my career since I was picked for Australia eight years ago that I thought I couldn't get back into the Test team."

== 1992 Tour of Sri Lanka ==
Matthews was picked again for the tour of Sri Lanka and here he did better.

In the First Test at Colombo he was Man of the Match as he made 6 and 64, took 3/93 and 4/76 and caught Ranjith Madurasinghe off Shane Warne to give Australia a 16 run win.

He followed this up with 55, 51, 57 and 96 to draw the two following Tests and Australia won the series. Matthews topped the batting aggregates for the series with 329 runs. However, Allan Border said "Greg's role is to bowl and get wickets. He'll come under the hammer if he goes back to Australia and doesn't take wickets."

== 1992–93 season ==
Matthews began the 1992–93 summer controversially when he was fined 25% of his 1992 players contract for appearing in a magazine crushing a packet of Benson and Hedges cigarettes. He was talking about giving up smoking but Benson and Hedges were a major sponsor of Australian cricket. Matthews' fining was criticised by several anti-smoking activists.

Cricket wise he scored 65 helping NSW beat WA.

Matthews was kept on as Australia's spinner for the First Test against the West Indies at the Gabba in 1992–93. "His performance over the past 12 months has been sensational", said Border. "He cops a lot of flak because his strike rate is not as high as some bowlers' but he's a 100 per cent man. It does come down to him taking wickets but I think he can do a job for us."

Matthews scored 30 useful runs and dismissed Brian Lara in a controversial stumping decision. However, his bowling was unable to help Australia dismiss the West Indies on the last day (he only took one wicket) and the game ended in a draw.

Matthews was picked in the Australian one day team. However, Shane Warne was drafted into the Australian 12 for the second test and although Matthews took 4–25 against South Australia for NSW in a Sheffield Shield game prior to the test Warne was preferred to Matthews for the final eleven. Warne's 7–52 in the second innings helped Australia win the game and saw him become Australia's first choice spinner.

Matthews was kept on in the Australian 12 for the third test at the Sydney Cricket Ground and played alongside Warne in the final eleven, replacing Mike Whitney.

"That wicket seems to be just what the doctor ordered for us," Border said. "It looks like it's going to play very well but hopefully assist the spinners. That's basically what we wanted to happen and I'm really happy with it. There's no safety-first stuff and we are going to go straight for the jugular."

He made 79, but was hit for 2/169 as Brian Lara made 277 in the tourists 606.

With Shane Warne in the side Australia no longer needed Matthews as a spinner, he could not get a place on his batting alone and he never played for the Australian test team again.

He did keep his place in the one day team that summer. However, his place was threatened by the re emergence of Tim May as an international spinner. "They've both done a good job but I think Tim May is forcing the issue, he looks to be in really good form", said Border. "In Greg's favour is that he bats and fields better than Tim but we've got to make sure Tim is the man to take a few wickets in that middle section a la Peter Taylor. You'd have to say that Greg is better than Tim all-round, but that's probably not what we want from the position. We want the spin bowler to be an attacking one. Getting wickets in that middle session is almost as import ant as getting 0–20. I'd rather the wickets than 0–20." Matthews ended up being preferred to May for the one day final series. He bowled well but when it came time to pick the team for the fourth test, Matthews was overlooked in favour of May. May's excellent bowling in that test ensured he was picked over Matthews as Australia's off spinner for the tour of New Zealand.

Matthews bowled well domestically that summer—he took 5–61 against Tasmania, 8–56 against WA. and six wickets against Victoria. His innings of 78 in the Sheffield Shield final was the turning point in the game helping NSW beat Queensland. However, Matthews was overlooked for the Australian tour of England in favour of Warne and May.

Matthews later hinted at politics being behind his lack of test cricket.

== 1993–94 season ==
Shane Warne and Tim May were very successful on the 1993 Ashes tour, and making breaking back into the Australian team hard for Matthews.

At the beginning of the 1993–94 season he pulled out of the NSW one day team for personal reasons and was sacked from the Sheffield Shield side, the first time he had been dropped from NSW in a decade. However, he was soon back in the side and took 4–82 and 7–99 against Tasmania.

Matthews travelled to Perth with the NSW team to play WA. Several players went out to a nightclub; Matthews stayed on his own and got in a fight, winding up in hospital. "To be out at 4am in the morning is not a good example for young cricketers", said NSW managed Neil Marks. Matthews had bruising inside his skull and spent several days in hospital. He decided not to pursue legal action. Matthews was unable to force his way back into the NSW team that season; they still won the Sheffield Shield.

== 1994–95 season ==
Matthews endured more controversy over the winter firing a toy pistol at a shop assistant. He was overlooked by NSW selectors at the beginning of the 1994–95 season. However, his club form was good and NSW struggled at the beginning of the season, so Matthews was recalled. Matthews had a reasonable summer, his form improving towards the end.

== 1995–96 season ==
Matthews continued to be an integral member of the NSW side during the 1995–96 season. "Cricket's my thing", Matthews said. "I just love playing it. What can I tell you—it's just my thing... The mind is very willing and the body is still pretty strong."

By this stage Matthews was well known for a series of TV ads he did for Advance Hair Studio.

== 1996–97 season ==
Greg Matthews was appointed captain of NSW for the 1996–97 season. Coach Geoff Lawson later said that the selectors had taken a huge gamble in making him captain, which "unequivocally didn't pay off ... I thought on the field he'd be a very astute tactical leader. He proved me very wrong in that regard. I know him as well as anybody. I went for him in the final washup and it was a huge error".

== 1997–98 season ==
In September 1997 Matthews became the New South Wales representative of the Australian Cricketers' Association, which had been formed in August on the 1997 tour of England.

1997–98 was his last summer of first-class cricket. His last first-class game was against New Zealand; Matthews scored 71.

== Later career ==
Matthews continued to play in the Sydney Grade Cricket competition for the University of Sydney team and had a bowling average of 11.04 for the 2008 season. On 24 January 2009, he bowled Australia opener Phil Jaques for 5 with his first ball when Sydney University was playing Sutherland. In 2009 he co-hosted SBS televisions coverage of The Ashes series alongside former Test players Stuart MacGill and Damien Martyn. In 2012 he began to coach part-time for The Sydney Grammar Cricket Club at all-age groups.

== Advertising ==
By the 1985–86 season, Matthews's eccentric personality was seen as making him a very saleable commodity. With the Australian cricket coach Bobby Simpson as his manager, he soon became a wealthy man, endorsing a range or products, until he and Simpson fell out. He later set up cricket coaching clinics with Steve Waugh and Brad McNamara in 1991–92. However, the distraction of having agents and pushing products unsettled his career, and he was "not so good that he can succeed in high company with giving his game everything he has". In the mid-1990s, Matthews was employed as a high-profile spokesman for hair regrowth company, Advanced Hair Studio, featuring in a series of advertisements in which he popularised the catchphrase, "Advanced Hair, yeah, yeah!" Fellow cricketers Graham Gooch, Martin Crowe and Shane Warne later went on to spruik for the same company.
