= James Whitaker (cricketer) =

English cricketer

Personal information
- Full name: John James Whitaker
- Born: 5 May 1962 (age 64); Skipton, West Riding of Yorkshire, England
- Batting: Right-handed
- Bowling: Right-arm off break
- Role: Batsman

International information
- National side: England
- Only Test (cap 524): 12 December 1986 v Australia
- ODI debut (cap 95): 2 April 1987 v India
- Last ODI: 7 April 1987 v Pakistan

Domestic team information
- Years: Team
- 1983–1999: Leicestershire

Career statistics
Competition	Test	ODI	FC	LA
Matches	1	2	315	282
Runs scored	11	48	17,198	7,770
Batting average	11.00	48.00	38.56	32.37
100s/50s	0/0	0/0	38/80	6/47
Top score	11	44*	218	155
Balls bowled	–	–	178	26
Wickets	–	–	2	0
Bowling average	–	–	134.00	–
5 wickets in innings	–	–	0	–
10 wickets in match	–	–	0	–
Best bowling	–	–	1/29	–
Catches/stumpings	1/–	1/–	172/–	66/–
- Source: Cricinfo, 1 January 2012

John James Whitaker (born 5 May 1962) is an English former cricketer, who played in one Test and two ODIs for England in 1986–7.

== Life and career ==
Whitaker was educated at Uppingham School and spent his whole career with Leicestershire County Cricket Club, and captained them from 1996 until he retired in 1999. In 1986, Whitaker was the leading English batsman in the national batting averages with 1,526 runs at 66 apiece, and was named one of the Wisden Cricketers of the Year for 1987. He was selected to go on the 1986-87 Ashes tour. He started the tour well, scoring a hundred against South Australia in a tour match, and played one Test in Adelaide when Ian Botham was out injured. However, his form fell away sharply. Whitaker also played two one-day internationals in 1987 for the England side which won the Sharjah Cup.

Whitaker was one of his county's most successful first-class captains, leading Leicestershire to their second County Championship in 1996, scoring 1046 runs at 58.11 that season, and also making his highest first-class score, 218, that year, in a match against Yorkshire. Whitaker also started the 1998 season, when Leicestershire also emerged as county champions, as captain, although he played little that season due to injury, the team being led on the field by Chris Lewis and Phil Simmons.

He later became the coach and director of cricket at the club, before leaving in 2005. On 18 January 2008, Geoff Miller took over from David Graveney as the national selector, heading up a four-man panel which included Peter Moores, Whitaker and Ashley Giles. He was England's chairman of selectors from 2013 to 2018.

== See also ==
- One Test Wonder
