= Gladstone Small =

English cricketer (born 1961)

Personal information
- Full name: Gladstone Cleophas Small
- Born: 18 October 1961 (age 65); St. George, Barbados
- Height: 5 ft 10 in (1.78 m)
- Batting: Right-handed
- Bowling: Right-arm fast-medium
- Role: Bowler

International information
- National side: England
- Test debut (cap 521): 7 August 1986 v New Zealand
- Last Test: 1 February 1991 v Australia
- ODI debut (cap 92): 1 January 1987 v Australia
- Last ODI: 20 August 1992 v Pakistan

Domestic team information
- Years: Team
- 1979–1999: Warwickshire
- 1985/86: South Australia

Career statistics
Competition	Test	ODI	FC	LA
Matches	17	53	315	390
Runs scored	263	98	4,409	1,072
Batting average	15.47	6.53	14.36	8.50
100s/50s	0/1	0/0	0/7	0/0
Top score	59	18*	70	40*
Balls bowled	3,927	2,793	24,392	18,434
Wickets	55	58	852	462
Bowling average	34.01	33.48	28.62	26.47
5 wickets in innings	2	0	29	5
10 wickets in match	0	0	2	0
Best bowling	5/48	4/31	7/15	5/18
Catches/stumpings	9/–	7/–	95/–	7/–
Medal record
Men's Cricket
Representing England
ICC Cricket World Cup
Runner-up	1987 India and Pakistan
Runner-up	1992 Australia and New Zealand
- Source: Cricinfo, 24 September 2005

Gladstone Cleophas Small (born 18 October 1961) is an English former cricketer who played in 17 Test matches and 53 One Day Internationals (ODIs) for the England cricket team. He was a part of the English squads which finished as runners-up at the 1987 Cricket World Cup and as runners-up at the 1992 Cricket World Cup.

Small was primarily a pace bowler, he was selected for the 1986–87 Ashes series in Australia, taking two five-wicket hauls that helped England win the series.

Small has Klippel–Feil syndrome, a genetic condition of the neck.

He is a Trustee of the Hornsby Professional Cricketers' Fund charity.

== Early life ==
Small was born in Barbados, and moved to England shortly after his fourteenth birthday, which at the time was past the normal cut-off for a change of cricketing nationality. However, he applied for eligibility to play cricket for England, and the Marylebone Cricket Club (MCC) accepted his application.

Small has Klippel–Feil syndrome, a rare congenital condition whereby the vertebrae in the neck are fused.

His life story was made into a documentary by director Pogus Caesar in 1995, and broadcast on Carlton Television for the Respect television series.

He is a graduate of Manchester Metropolitan University.

== Domestic career ==
Small was integral to the Warwickshire side of 1994, also featuring Dermot Reeve and Brian Lara, which won three major trophies, the County Championship, the Benson & Hedges Cup and the Axa Equity & Law League. He also played in the final when Warwickshire won the NatWest Trophy in 1989 and 1993, and contributed when they won the 1997 Axa Life League and the 1995 County Championship (albeit in fewer matches). He played his last first-class match in 1997 and his last one-day match in 1999. Later, he became a director of the Professional Cricketers' Association.

Small encountered early problems in his career with the no ball rule, on one occasion recording ten in a single over. But he overcame the issue to become a useful bowler for Warwickshire, and earned a Test debut for England against New Zealand at Trent Bridge in 1986, retaining his place for the following match.

== International career ==
Small was selected that winter for the 1986–87 Ashes series. Initially overlooked for the Test matches, Small was called up as a last-minute replacement for Graham Dilley in the fourth Test at Melbourne, and rose to the challenge, taking 5-48 (his best figures in a Test match innings) in Australia's first innings and claiming two wickets in the second. He was given the Man of the Match award, and this was to be the highlight of his career. His success as an outswing bowler is demonstrated by the fact that all of these seven dismissals were out caught. Again he retained his place for the following match at Sydney, where he recorded another five-wicket haul. He topped the England bowling averages this series with 12 wickets at 15 runs each. This would be the last time England would win an Ashes series before 2005.

Small was in England's squad for both the 1987 and 1992 Cricket World Cups, playing in the 1987 final, and the semi-final (although not the final) in 1992. He took his best one-day international bowling of 4-31, again winning the Man of the Match award, in an England victory over the West Indies at his home county ground in Birmingham in 1988. He was also part of the England side which improbably beat a powerful West Indies team in Jamaica in 1990, England's first Test victory against the West Indies for sixteen years. Small took five wickets in this match. Later on this tour he took his best match figures in a Test match, 8-183, at Barbados, although England lost this match narrowly due to a devastating spell from Curtly Ambrose, and went on to lose the series. Small took 17 wickets at 29.70 in this series, the most wickets of any England bowler except for Devon Malcolm, and the Wisden review of the series noted that Small "bowled with dedicated skill and control".

An unpretentious lower-order batsman, Small helped save a Test match when making his highest Test score, 59, against Australia in the sixth test at the Oval in 1989. His innings helped England save the follow on, a landmark which when achieved received an exaggerated ovation from England fans, who had seen their team humiliated during the rest of the series (this being Small's only match in the series). Indeed, owing to injury and the selectors' inconsistency, this was one of only two Tests he played in the three years after his success in the 1986–87 Ashes. He was in the runs again the following year, making 44 not out as England beat New Zealand to record a rare series win, but was dropped from the Test side thereafter.

Small was selected again for the 1990–91 Ashes series, although on this occasion Small and the team were less successful, and he played no more Test cricket thereafter. He was involved in an unusual incident in the third test of this series when wicketkeeper Jack Russell dismissed Dean Jones stumped off his bowling, at the time a manner of dismissal only common off spin bowlers. He played his last full international (a one-day international) in 1992, although the following year he hit the winning run as England won the Hong Kong Sixes tournament, also featuring in the squad that retained the title the following year.
