= Greg Dyer =

Australian cricketer

Personal information
- Full name: Gregory Charles Dyer
- Born: 16 March 1959 (age 67); Parramatta, New South Wales, Australia
- Batting: Right-handed
- Role: Wicket-keeper

International information
- National side: Australia
- Test debut (cap 339): 12 December 1986 v England
- Last Test: 12 February 1988 v Sri Lanka
- ODI debut (cap 94): 24 September 1986 v India
- Last ODI: 4 February 1988 v England

Domestic team information
- Years: Team
- 1983/84–1988/89: New South Wales

Career statistics
Competition	Test	ODI	FC	LA
Matches	6	23	51	45
Runs scored	131	174	1,671	408
Batting average	21.83	15.81	28.81	20.40
100s/50s	0/1	0/0	1/10	0/1
Top score	60	45*	106	52*
Catches/stumpings	22/2	24/4	123/18	39/9
Medal record
Men's Cricket
Representing Australia
ICC Cricket World Cup
Winner	1987 India and Pakistan
- Source: CricketArchive, 14 January 2013

Gregory Charles Dyer (born 16 March 1959) is a former New South Wales and Australian wicketkeeper. Dyer played in six Tests and 23 ODIs from 1986 to 1988, including playing in the victorious 1987 World Cup Final. He toured India in 1986 as a back-up keeper.

Dyer replaced Tim Zoehrer for only a few Tests as his international career was cut short by the emergence of Ian Healy, along with a controversial incident in a Test match against New Zealand in 1987–88. Dyer claimed to have caught New Zealand batsman Andrew Jones who was duly given out, although television replays showed the ball had touched the ground before being caught by Dyer. He was subsequently dropped from the team two matches later and retired from first-class cricket shortly thereafter.

He shares an Australian One Day International 7th-wicket partnership record with Steve Waugh.

In 2011, Dyer became the president of the Australian Cricketers' Association.

== Career ==
Dyer played for NSW and Australian Under 19 teams, and for NSW colts. He became New South Wales' preferred back up keeper for Steve Rixon when Rixon was injured or was busy on international duty. Notably, Dyer played several games in 1984-85 when NSW won the Sheffield Shield.

When Rixon signed to tour in South Africa, Dyer became New South Wales' first choice wicketkeeper. He was a crucial part of the team which won the Shield again in 1985–86.

=== 1986 tour of India ===
Australia's wicketkeeper over the 1985-86 summer was Wayne Phillips, but his form dropped away and Tim Zoehrer was appointed in his place. Dyer was unofficially announced next in line when selected as a reserve keeper on the 1986 tour to India.

Dyer performed strongly in tour games but Zoehrer was first choice keeper for the three Test matches.

He played in some one day games, making his ODI debut in the third game. In the fourth ODI he came to the wicket when Australia was 6-136 and he and Steve Waugh put on a 102 run stand off 76 balls. He played in the 5th and 6th ODI.

Dyer also scored a century against Delhi in a tour game.

=== 1986-87 Test debut ===
Dyer made his Test debut during the third Test of the 1986-87 Ashes when Zoehrer was injured. Dyer broke his nose during the game but kept playing. He was not required to bat in the game, which was a run-heavy draw.

Zoehrer's aggressive on field behaviour over the summer was causing media controversy and Dyer was increasingly spoken of as a more viable option. After the 1987 tour to Sharjah, Zoehrer was omitted from the squad to tour India for the World Cup; he was replaced by Dyer.

=== 1987 World Cup ===
Dyer was a key part of the Australian team which won the 1987 World Cup.

Following this triumph, Dyer was appointed captain of NSW for the 1987–88 season.

=== 1987-88 summer ===
Dyer began the 1987-88 summer as Australia's first choice keeper as they took on New Zealand. In the first Test, Dyer took six catches and scored 8 runs with the bat, as Australia earned a then-rare victory. In the second Test, a draw, Dyer scored 60.

==== Catching controversy ====
In the third Test, New Zealand were 1-119 when Dyer claimed a catch off Andrew Jones from the bowling of Craig McDermott. TV replays showed that Dyer had fumbled the ball. This decision later proved extremely costly for New Zealand because Australia only just narrowly escaped with a draw in the game. (Dyer scored 21 and 4 with the bat.)

"Dyer has to live with his conscience for the rest of his life – no way can I blame the umpires," said New Zealand's cricket manager.

Dyer later made a statement saying:

I have not commented earlier because I was in the middle of a Test match and was trying to concentrate on it and also because I, and the Australian team management, felt it would have been inappropriate to comment on umpiring decisions... Given that the ball initially hit my left glove and ended in my right glove, I made a gesture of query to the umpires. However, I honestly believed at the time of the incident, as did my captain and my teammates, that the ball had not touched the ground. One angle of slow motion TV replay apparently indicates that the ball had in fact touched the ground. In the circumstances I can understand Andrew Jones being upset, but I would like Andrew, along with all other interested parties, to know that I acted in good faith.

Australian captain Allan Border said, "I had no doubt whatsoever it was taken and I got a shock later when I saw the replays. Greg was very upset."

Dyer kept his spot in the team for the one-off Bicentennial Test between Australia and England in February 1988. Dyer took three catches and scored a duck in a drawn game. His last Test for Australia was the one-off Test against Sri Lanka. Dyer took six catches and scored 38 in a comfortable Australian win.

=== Dropped from Australian team ===
New South Wales finished third at the end of the season under Dyer's leadership. In March 1988, Dyer was dropped from the Australian team to tour Pakistan that winter in favour of Ian Healy. This was considered a shock selection at the time because Healy was relatively inexperienced at first class level.

He was reappointed captain of NSW for the 1988-89 summer. He was sacked mid season, replaced as wicketkeeper by Phil Emery and as captain by Geoff Lawson.
