= Graham Dilley =

English cricketer

Personal information
- Full name: Graham Roy Dilley
- Born: 18 May 1959; Dartford, Kent, England
- Died: 5 October 2011 (aged 52); Leicester, England
- Nickname: Dill, Picca
- Height: 6 ft 4 in (1.93 m)
- Batting: Left-handed
- Bowling: Right arm fast
- Role: Bowler

International information
- National side: England
- Test debut (cap 483): 14 December 1979 v Australia
- Last Test: 11 July 1989 v Australia
- ODI debut (cap 51): 28 November 1979 v West Indies
- Last ODI: 21 May 1988 v West Indies

Domestic team information
- Years: Team
- 1977–1986: Kent
- 1985/86: Natal
- 1987–1992: Worcestershire

Career statistics
Competition	Test	ODI	FC	LA
Matches	41	36	234	207
Runs scored	521	114	2,339	675
Batting average	13.35	11.40	14.71	11.25
100s/50s	0/2	0/0	0/4	0/0
Top score	56	31*	81	37*
Balls bowled	8,192	2,043	34,418	10,438
Wickets	138	48	648	279
Bowling average	29.76	26.89	26.84	22.92
5 wickets in innings	6	0	34	2
10 wickets in match	0	0	3	0
Best bowling	6/38	4/23	7/63	5/29
Catches/stumpings	10/–	4/–	75/–	40/–
- Source: Cricinfo, 17 November 2008

Graham Roy Dilley (18 May 1959 – 5 October 2011) was an English international cricketer, whose main role was as a fast bowler. He played first-class cricket for Kent County Cricket Club and Worcestershire County Cricket Clubs, and appeared in 41 Test matches and 36 One Day International (ODIs) for the England cricket team.

Dilley is perhaps best remembered for his tail-end batting with Ian Botham in England's second innings against Australia at Headingley in 1981, reaching his highest Test score of 56 in an eighth-wicket partnership of 117 runs.

== Early life ==
Dilley was born and raised in Dartford, Kent and was educated at Dartford High School. He played his early cricket for Dartford Cricket Club at Hesketh Park and trained as a diamond cutter at Hatton Garden before embarking on a cricketing career with Kent County Cricket Club. He first played for the Kent Second XI in 1976, aged 17.

He was married and divorced twice and had four children, including Chris Pennell, who has played rugby union for England and Worcester Warriors, whilst his youngest son, Jonathan, has played cricket for both Gloucestershire and Worcestershire Second XIs. Kent cricketer Graham Johnson was a brother-in-law.

== Early cricket career ==
A fast bowler, Dilley made his first-class cricket debut for Kent at the age of 18 in 1977, against Cambridge University. He failed to take a wicket, and was not selected again until the following season when was again wicketless against the touring Pakistanis. Seven wickets in his third first-class match, against Middlesex, followed, although he took only one wicket in two further matches later in the season. He was, however, selected for England Young Cricketers against their West Indian counterparts.

In 1979, Dilley played 31 senior games for Kent, including taking four wickets for the cost of 41 runs (4/41) in a World Cup warm-up match against the New Zealanders. He finished with 49 first-class wickets at an average of 23.48 runs per wicket.

== England selection ==
The England selectors, looking for a young fast bowler for that winter's tour of Australia, took the bold decision to include the 20-year-old Dilley in the squad. He made his international debut in a One Day International against West Indies on 24 November 1979 at Sydney during the 1979/80 Australian Tri-Series, a triangular tournament that also featured Australia. Dilley opened the bowling and took his first wicket in his third over.

A fortnight later, Dilley appeared in his first Test match, making him the youngest cricketer to play for England in 30 years. England captain Mike Brearley showed confidence in his young bowler and he again opened the bowling. He took two wickets on debut. Australia finished their innings on 244 all out. In England's reply Dilley scored an unbeaten 38 runs, the second-highest score of the innings as England were all out for 228. He batted for 206 minutes, facing 57 balls. The game featured a memorable item on the second-innings scorecard:

Lillee c Willey b Dilley 19

Although he also played in the second Test, he was replaced by John Lever for the third and final match of the series. Dilley took only seven wickets on that tour – "£7,000 for seven wickets" as the tour manager Alec Bedser commented.

In 1980, Dilley was not selected until the third Test against West Indies, at Old Trafford. Rain intervened, as it was to do in the fourth and fifth Tests as well, and all were drawn, but Dilley's eleven wickets, in the three innings he was able to bowl in, made sure of his place to face the same opponents in the Caribbean that winter. He took ten wickets on the tour, enough to retain his place for the 1981 Ashes series.

Nothing that he had done before, from the moment he made his Test debut as the youngest Englishman for 30 years, until the day he retired from competitive cricket – not even the five for 68 he took in Brisbane in the winter of 1986–87 that catalysed a victory in match and Ashes series – would ever topple Headingley from the pinnacle of his achievements. It remains one of the most celebrated passages in the history of British sport.

— Mike Selvey, writing in 2011

Dilley began the 1981 Ashes series strongly, taking 12 wickets in the first two Tests, and was retained for the third Test at Headingley. This game is best remembered for England's sensational victory after following on, and for the heroics of Ian Botham and Bob Willis, but Dilley played his part as well, albeit as a batsman. Coming to the crease in the second innings with England at 135/7, 92 runs in arrears, Dilley had no orders from his captain, Mike Brearley, when he joined Botham at the crease. Botham said, "Right then, let's have a bit of fun", and the two men put on 117 in just 80 minutes before Dilley (56 runs from 75 balls) was bowled by Terry Alderman. England eventually established a lead of 130, and Dilley then held a boundary catch to dismiss Rod Marsh in Australia's second innings, England going on to dismiss Australia for 111, winning by 18 runs.

Despite his part in the win at Headingley, Dilley did not play in the fourth Test, nor in the two that followed, being replaced variously by John Emburey, Paul Allott and Mike Hendrick. He did get picked for the subsequent 1981/2 India tour, having pulled out of Graham Gooch's rebel tour of South Africa, something he later regretted for financial reasons.

=== Injury and recovery ===
Despite being in and out of the team, Dilley's future as an international player seemed reasonably bright by 1983, and he played a full part in England's 1983 Cricket World Cup campaign. Following the tournament, a neck injury forced him out of the game for a year, and although he returned to county cricket in 1985, there was some doubt as to his long-term prospects. A decent performance that winter for Natal in South Africa helped in his rehabilitation and in 1986 Dilley took 63 first-class wickets and earned a recall to the England team.

Between 1986 and 1988, Dilley took 83 Test wickets at an average of 26.43 runs per wicket. Generally regarded as England's foremost strike bowler, he developed significant pace and outswing from a long, wide run up, approaching the wicket at an angle of almost 45 degrees. Perhaps his most significant success came in 1986/87 when he took 5/68 in the first innings of the first Test at Brisbane to help his team to a victory that set them on their way to an Ashes win. Later on that tour, Dilley helped England to further success in winning the Benson & Hedges Challenge and the World Series Cup, taking his best one-day international figures of 4/23 in a match against the West Indies (a performance which won him the man of the match award). He also won the man of the match award for another one-day international performance against the West Indies that winter in which he took 4/46.

In the drawn series against New Zealand the following winter Dilley produced his career-best Test match innings bowling figures, taking 6/38 including the first five wickets to fall at Christchurch. He was fined £250 in the same match for swearing at the umpire, comments which were clearly picked up by the stump microphone. He took a further five-wicket haul at Auckland, and finished the series with 15 wickets at an average of 14.

== Later career ==
For the 1987 season, Dilley moved to Worcestershire. His new county were about to begin the most successful period in their history, winning four trophies in the next three years. Despite further injury problems, he proved a key bowler as Worcestershire won the 1988 and 1989 County Championships; it was during this period that he wrote, with team-mate Graeme Hick, an account of one of the title-winning seasons, entitled Hick'n'Dilley Circus.

Dilley recorded his best match figures in a Test match at Lord's in 1988, match figures of 9/128 (comprising 5/55 and 4/73) against the West Indies, although England lost the match. However, Dilley's international career was beginning to wind down by the end of that season, and his final Test was at Edgbaston in the 1989 Ashes series. He made certain that he would not be picked again by accompanying Mike Gatting on the rebel tour to South Africa that winter. Unusually he finished on the winning team only twice in his 41 Test matches (the Headingley test of 1981 and that at Brisbane in 1986), the 1980s being a lean time for English cricket.

He continued to play for his county and in the 1991 season came sixth in the first-class bowling averages in domestic cricket (among bowlers who had taken a minimum of twenty wickets), taking 37 wickets at 22.24, also helping Worcestershire to win the Benson and Hedges Cup.

However recurring injury problems led to his retirement at the end of the 1992 season.

== Post-retirement ==
Dilley's move to Worcestershire denied him the financial security of a benefit season. After retirement from playing, he found employment as a coach, firstly for the England women's cricket team, and then accompanying the men's team on their tour to India in 2001/02. He also worked in a coaching capacity for Zimbabwe and Scotland. His last position was as head coach for Loughborough University Centre of Cricketing Excellence, where he was director of cricket for 11 years. At Loughborough he coached, among others, Monty Panesar, James Anyon, Ruel Brathwaite, James Adams and Rob Taylor.

== Death ==
Dilley died in a hospice at Leicester on 5 October 2011, aged 52, just one week after being diagnosed with oesophageal cancer. A memorial service was held in Worcester Cathedral on 9 November 2011.
