= Bill Athey =

English cricketer

Personal information
- Full name: Charles William Jeffrey Athey
- Born: 27 September 1957 (age 69); Middlesbrough, North Riding of Yorkshire, England
- Height: 5 ft 11 in (1.80 m)
- Batting: Right-handed
- Bowling: Right-arm medium
- Role: Batsman

International information
- National side: England
- Test debut (cap 487): 28 August 1980 v Australia
- Last Test: 26 July 1988 v West Indies
- ODI debut (cap 56): 20 August 1980 v West Indies
- Last ODI: 16 March 1988 v New Zealand

Career statistics
Competition	Test	ODI
Matches	23	31
Runs scored	919	848
Batting average	22.97	31.40
100s/50s	1/4	2/4
Top score	123	142*
Balls bowled	0	1
Wickets	–	0
Bowling average	–	–
5 wickets in innings	–	–
10 wickets in match	–	–
Best bowling	–	–
Catches/stumpings	13/–	16/–
Medal record
Men's Cricket
Representing England
ICC Cricket World Cup
Runner-up	1987 India and Pakistan
- Source: CricInfo, 12 September 2010

Charles William Jeffrey Athey (born 27 September 1957) is a retired English first-class cricketer, who played for England, and first-class cricket for Gloucestershire, Yorkshire and Sussex; he also played a solitary one-day game for Worcestershire. His bulldog spirit was exemplified by the Union Jack tattooed on his arm. He played in 23 Test matches between 1980 and 1988, but scored more than 50 runs only five times in 41 innings. In 1990, Athey joined the rebel tour to South Africa. He was a part of the English squad which finished as runners-up at the 1987 Cricket World Cup.

== Domestic career ==
He made his debut for his native Yorkshire in 1976, before moving to Gloucestershire in 1984. He captained the side in 1989, and scored four hundreds in successive innings while there. In 1993, he moved to Sussex, and passed the increasingly rare landmark of 25,000 first-class runs when he made an unbeaten century against Somerset in 1997.

At the end of that season he joined Worcestershire as coach, having 'retired' from playing, though in spite of his status he did play several times for the Second XI and once (in 1999) in a National League game. He left New Road at the end of 2000. He played 467 first-class matches and batted 784 times with 71 not outs. He scored 25,453 first-class runs, with a best of 184, at an average of 35.69, with 55 centuries and 126 fifties. He took 429 catches, and 2 stumpings on his rare ventures behind the stumps. In 459 List A one-day matches, he scored 13,240 runs, with a top score of 142 not out at an average of 33.86, scoring 12 centuries, 89 fifties, and taking 171 catches and one stumping. He also played Minor Counties cricket for Suffolk.

== International career ==
He was a middle order batsman by inclination, but found greatest success at Test level as an opener. Selected for the 1986/87 tour of Australia as middle order cover, he ended up opening in all five Tests with Chris Broad. His top score was 96 in Perth. In the 1987 summer, he was initially meant to revert to the middle order, but an injury to Broad meant that he opened in the first Test with Tim Robinson. However, in the second Test he reverted to number three, and made his only Test hundred at Lord's.

He missed only one of twenty Test matches from 1986 to 1988. Nevertheless, his 23 Test appearances were spread over eight years. He made his debut in the Centenary Test at Lord's in 1980, and eight years later appeared in the Bicentennial Test in Sydney, along with fellow survivors John Emburey and Mike Gatting.

Although never thought of as a one-day player, Athey hit two centuries in One Day Internationals, and top-scored for England before being run out in their Cricket World Cup final defeat against Australia at Calcutta in 1987. He was suspended for playing in South Africa in 1990, but the suspension was remitted two years later when South Africa rejoined the world game.

== After cricket ==
Athey now works at Dulwich College school in South London, as the First XI Cricket Coach. He also takes the Second XI football team, and is house master of Old Blew, one of the four Dulwich College boarding houses.

Athey also played football and was on the books of Brentford Reserves in the early 1980s. He also played football for Ringmer FC whiles playing cricket for Sussex in the 90's

== Personal life ==
Politically, Athey is a Conservative, and once appeared on stage at a Conservative Party conference in the 1980s alongside England teammate John Emburey.
