= Peter Taylor (Australian cricketer) =

Australian cricketer

Personal information
- Full name: Peter Laurence Taylor
- Born: 22 August 1956 (age 70); North Sydney, New South Wales, Australia
- Height: 183 cm (6 ft 0 in)
- Batting: Left-handed
- Bowling: Right-arm offbreak
- Role: All rounder

International information
- National side: Australia (1987–1992)
- Test debut (cap 340): 10 January 1987 v England
- Last Test: 26 December 1991 v India
- ODI debut (cap 96): 18 January 1987 v England
- Last ODI: 18 March 1992 v West Indies

Domestic team information
- Years: Team
- 1985/86–1988/89: New South Wales
- 1990/91–1991/92: Queensland

Career statistics
Competition	Test	ODI
Matches	13	83
Runs scored	431	437
Batting average	26.93	19.86
100s/50s	0/2	0/1
Top score	87	54*
Balls bowled	2,227	3,937
Wickets	27	97
Bowling average	39.55	28.24
5 wickets in innings	1	0
10 wickets in match	0	0
Best bowling	6/78	4/38
Catches/stumpings	10/–	34/–
Medal record
Men's Cricket
Representing Australia
ICC Cricket World Cup
Winner	1987 India and Pakistan
- Source: CricInfo, 12 December 2005

Peter Laurence Taylor (born 22 August 1956) is a former Australian cricketer who played in 13 Test matches and 83 One Day Internationals between 1987 and 1992. He became a Test match selector for Australia in the late 1990s. Taylor was a part of the Australian team that won their first world title during the 1987 Cricket World Cup.

== Domestic career ==
His initial selection for Australia in 1986–87 came after only a handful of games for NSW was a huge shock. It was initially thought that his more known New South Wales colleague Mark Taylor had been selected. He was dubbed Peter Who? by the media. Taylor played for New South Wales in the Sheffield Shield between 1985 and 1990 and played two seasons for Queensland (1990–92).

== International career ==
He justified his selection with a stunning 6/78 on debut against England at Sydney. He however was unable to repeat such a feat again in his test career (12 more matches between 1987 and 1992).

However Taylor became the staple spin-bowler of the Australian One Day team of the late 1980s and early 1990s. He was able to bowl his off-spin with economy and pick up vital wickets in matches. He was also a good fielder and an able lower order batsman. He played 83 times taking 97 wickets between 1987 and 1992, appearing in both the 1987 and the 1992 World Cups.

Taylor was noted for his deliberate approach to the wicket and the rhythmical nature of his bowling action that involved him first swinging his bowling arm, joining hands as he swung forwards then completing a loop of his joined hands before delivering the ball. He was noted as a heavy spinner of a cricket ball and comparisons were made with Ashley Mallett, also a former Australian spin bowler.

== Notes ==
- Benaud, Richie (1991). Border & Co: A Tribute To Cricket's World Champions. Hamlyn Australia. ISBN 0-947334-31-9.
