= Australian cricket team in the West Indies in 1983–84 =

International cricket tour

| | West Indies | Australia |
- Dates: 18 February – 28 April 1984
| Captains | CH Lloyd | KJ Hughes |

Test series
- Result: West Indies won the 5-match series 3–0
| Most runs | DL Hayes (468) | AR Border (521) |
| Most wickets | J Garner (31) | GF Lawson (12) |

One Day International series
- Results: West Indies won the 4-match series 3–1
| Most runs | DL Hayes (340) | AR Border (146) |
| Most wickets | J Garner (7) | JN Maguire (4) |

The Australian cricket team toured the West Indies in the 1983–84 season to play a five-match Test series against the West Indies.

The West Indies won the series 3–0 with two matches drawn, and therefore retained the Sir Frank Worrell Trophy.

Wisden said that Australia "were outplayed in every department of the game, sometimes embarrassingly so." The West Indies did not lose a single second innings wicket in any of the five Tests and were only once dismissed for fewer than 300. Australia made more than 300 only once.

The series was enormously successful for Allan Border who was top scorer in half his ten Test innings and scored more than twice as many as anyone else in the team. It also saw the establishment of Wayne Phillips as Australia's first-choice wicketkeeper after Roger Woolley initially looked like taking the job. However veteran Australian players such as Geoff Lawson, Rodney Hogg, Kim Hughes and David Hookes performed poorly.

== Australian squad ==
Australia had just defeated Pakistan 2–0 at home during the 1983–84 season. However this was the first tour the team had undertaken since the retirement of Greg Chappell, Dennis Lillee and Rod Marsh.

The original squad selected were as follows:

- Batsmen – Kim Hughes (captain), Allan Border (vice-captain), Greg Ritchie, Steve Smith, Kepler Wessels, Graham Yallop, David Hookes, Wayne Phillips (also backup wicketkeeper)
- Fastbowlers – Terry Alderman, Geoff Lawson, Rodney Hogg, Carl Rackemann, John Maguire
- Spinners – Tom Hogan, Greg Matthews
- Wicketkeepers – Roger Woolley
- Support team – Col Egar (manager), Geoff Dymock (assistant manager), Errol Allcot
- Selectors – Hughes, Border, Dymock

The selection of the side was generally uncontroversial – all the players had been in good form over the Australian summer, and those that did not play test cricket had played one day games for Australia. Smith toured Sri Lanka while Ritchie had played three tests in Pakistan.

Western Australian all rounder Ken MacLeay had been thought a possible tourist but his form had fallen away during the summer. Spinner Murray Bennett was considered unlucky to not be picked, having been in the Australian squad against Pakistan that summer. Jeff Thomson was overlooked despite an excellent domestic season.

Former test bowler turned journalist Bill O'Reilly thought Bob Holland, then Australia's leading leg spinner, should have been taken because of the success of leg spinners on West Indian wickets. Holland had a better domestic record than Matthews that summer but was not as skilled with the bat. (The bowling of Bennett and Holland would later deliver Australia a rare test victory over the West Indies the subsequent Australian summer.)

Ian Chappell thought Australia's selectors should have gambled on a leg spinner, Peter Sleep, instead of Tom Hogan.

David Hookes had not played for the Australian test side for a while but was in the one day team and had toured the West Indies before, and his experience was thought to be useful considering the retirements of Chappell, Lillee and Marsh.

Roger Woolley, the first choice wicketkeeper, was the first Tasmanian based player to be picked for Australia since Laurie Nash in 1931. Rod Marsh had been Australia's wicketkeeper since the 1970–71 summer, so Woolley had the chance to establish himself in that role long term. His main rival for the position had been New South Wales' Steve Rixon. Australian selectors had indicated their preference for Woolley by sending him on the tour to Sri Lanka in 1983, and he had scored 532 first class runs at an average of 44.5 that summer. Woolley:

For the next three months I've a job to do as a batsman keeper. That's all I'm thinking about for the time being.... I was worried about Queenslander Ray Phillips this season – he had taken a lot of catches and I hadn't. Strangely, we were not getting wickets that way and my tally, along with the other Tasmanian fieldmen, was down. But 1 felt the Sri Lankan tour has brought me along and my batting was improving with the responsibility of being Sheffield Shield captain.

The "comeback story" of the Australian squad was bowler Terry Alderman, who had damaged his shoulder in November 1982 while tackling a spectator who had charged on to the ground.

=== Replacements ===
Graham Yallop had injured his knee during a one-day international in Australia in 1984 and it was unsure if he would be able to tour so Dean Jones was placed on standby. Rod McCurdy was announced as a backup if any bowlers were injured. Steve Smith and Greg Ritchie injured themselves during the one-day finals and David Boon and Graeme Wood were placed on standby for them. Both Smith and Ritchie recovered to fly out with the squad.

Yallop never made the tour and Jones took his place. Kepler Wessels was injured in the West Indies and Graeme Wood flew out to take his place. McCurdy did not tour.

=== Pre Tour Contractual Dispute ===
The tour was marked by a contractual dispute between the players and the Australian Cricket Board. The ACB were worried about players going on "rebel" cricket tours to South Africa. This was resolved after some amendments to the contract.

=== Criticism of Kim Hughes ===
There was also the issue of Ian Chappell's constant criticisms of Kim Hughes' captaincy. Hughes had been given the captaincy over Rod Marsh, whom many – particularly Chappell – thought was the superior candidate. At a testimonial dinner for Marsh in February 1984, Chappell, paraphrasing a country and western song, claimed that "Hughes got the goldmine, Marsh the shaft". This resulted in Hughes refusing to participate in pre-game interviews with Chappell at the end of the 1983–84 Australian summer. Hughes:

It was a terribly embarrassing thing in front of a full roll-up of the team. It was more so when 30 or 40 more people came up to me after the dinner and said they disagreed with Ian Chappell's remarks and said that in their opinion I had been doing a good job. I've always said that if you don't have anything good to say about a person you don't say anything at all. I don't have to put up with people who make remarks about me... I have conducted myself, in my belief, beyond reproach. I might be a 'nice guy' but I was certainly embarrassed with my team there at the testimonial and I won't put up with it. If Channel Nine wants Ian Chappell to handle their interviews that's their business, but I won't be any part of it.

Peter McFarline wrote "a good tour as batsman and captain in the next 90 days should silence his detractors for some time to come." Dean Jones later recalled:

It was an awful time to play for Australia. Greg Chappell, Rod Marsh and Dennis Lillee had just retired from Test cricket and South African cricket officials, like Dr Ali Bacher, were lingering around trying to induce players to play in South Africa on an unauthorised tour. I was the first player to reject Bacher's $200,000 tax-free offer and my teammates hated me for it. Players had their own agendas. Our team culture was pathetic and most players were very selfish.

Hughes was upbeat at the beginning of the tour:

We are not going to win Tests against their pace attack by just playing shots – we must physically defend our wickets right from one to 11. The experienced ones know the need – and newcomers like Steve Smith and Dean Jones have learned quickly. You only have to recall Dean Jones, without a helmet, advancing down the wicket to confront Michael Holding to see the spirit in the side... A big factor is that I think we are a fitter line-up than the Windies after their Australian tour. And how much longer can Clive Lloyd keep going too?... We go as underdogs – I think that's an advantage... We haven't won a series overseas since 1975 and this is a tough challenge for us. But there is no doubting the cricket ability in the squad – but we must cope with conditions arising out of living away from home. They know they have to consider a total of 350 to 400 runs every time we go to the crease.

== Early games ==
=== Australia vs Leeward Islands, Warner Park, Basseterre, St Kitts ===
The first tour game was against Leeward Islands. It was held on the island of St Kitts, where Australia had not played since 1965. The team flew from Sydney via San Francisco, New York, and Antigua before arriving in St Kitts - a 46 hour trip. They arrived 30 hours before play was to start. David Hookes was selected despite having not played cricket for a month. Viv Richards and Andy Roberts were left out of the Leeward Islands team but Richie Richardson and Eldine Baptiste were selected. Australia rested fast bowlers Rodney Hogg and Geoff Lawson and Greg Matthews was 12th man with Tom Hogan the spinner.

Australia won the toss, elected to bat and scored 7-429, with good innings from Wessels (126 retired hurt), Hughes (61), Border (74) and Hookes (66), Eldine Baptiste taking 4-95. Hughes and Wessels put on 125 runs in 95 minutes and Border and Hookes 134 in 75 minutes. A local called Johnny Gomez acted as 12th man dressed in a tuxedo and hat wheeling a silver drinks tray on to the ground. Greg Ritchie and Wayne Phillips, who were rooming together, arrived 75 minutes late for the second day's play.

Australia dismissed Leeward Islands for 305 (Julien 123, Baptiste 57) with Rackemann taking 6-105 off 35 overs, and Alderman 3-52. Rackemann was hit in the groin taking a catch off Julien and collapsed to the ground in pain, but Hughes insisted he keep bowlind and he did. Tom Hogan did not bowl particularly well and it was thought Greg Matthews would keep his spot for the first test. Australia declared at 7-250, Wessells making 86 (he and Phillips put on 114 for the opening partnership although Phillips only scored 23 and did not bat well.

Australia dismissed Leeward for 170, with Rackemann, Alderman and Maguire taking three wickets each. Hughes called it "a tremendous start" to the tour. McFarline said "Hogan bowled without penetration and too full while Woolley's work, especially on the leg side, was sloppy. But he has not kept to these bowlers for some time and will need some time to adjust."

Phillips and Ritchie were fined by their teammates and presented with a T shirt which said "missing in action... St Kitts 1984".

=== Australia vs Guyana ===
The Australians then flew six hours to Guyana to play a tour game against the local side, a one day international, and a test match. There was some apprehension that protests might be made over the presence of Wessels, South African born and raised, as the Guyanese government had objected to the presence of Robin Jackman, a South African connected player who toured with the English side in 1981. However Wessels was allowed into the country.

Kim Hughes missed this game due to a torn hamstring strain so Allan Border captained the side and Dean Jones replaced Hughes. Steve Smith, who had been rested for the first tour game, replaced Wessels. Guyana picked two spinners, Roger Harper and Clyde Butts, as did Australia (Hogan, Matthews). Australia batted first and scored 6-467 before declaring; all Australia's batters made runs except Wayne Phillips (1): Smith (105), Ritchie (64 off 69 balls), Border (113), Hookes (61) and Jones (58). Guyana declared at 8-417 (Andy Jackman 125, Mohamed 68, Hogg 5-144, Hogan 2-66). Roger Woolley dropped Jackman when the batter was on 2.

Australia scored 5-276 in their second innings, Smith making another century (116) with runs to Phillips (62) and Jones (60). Smith was dropped six times during his innings. Border declared leading Guyana to score 327 on the final day - they were 6-144 at one stage but held on to be 8-260 at stumps (Roger Harper 86, Hogan 5-95). Woolley broke a finger and could not keep in Guyana's second innings. Smith was awarded Man of the Match)

The game was marred by conflict between Geoff Lawson and a local umpire over a decision and minor injuries to Woolley and Lawson; Peter McFarline also questioned the uninspiring captaincy of Allan Border.

The early good form of the Australian squad plus injuries to Malcolm Marshall and Michael Holding led to some optimistic forecasts. Cricketer writer Peter McFarline wrote that "the Australians, to a man, are confident they can win both [the first test and one day international], even though the odds against them in local eyes are substantial."

== 1st ODI ==
29 February 1984
Scorecard

| Australia; 231/5 (50 overs) | v | West Indies; 233/2 (48 overs) |
| SB Smith 60 (110); HA Gomes 3/34 (10 overs) | | DL Haynes 133* (147); CG Rackemann 1/54 (10 overs) |

West Indies won by 8 wickets
Albion Sports Complex, Albion, Guyana
Umpires: CE Cumberbatch and DJ Narine
Player of the match: DL Haynes (WIN)

- Australia won the toss and elected to bat.
- MA Small (WIN) made his ODI debut.

For the first one-day international of the tour, Australia picked Wayne Phillips as keeper and selected Dean Jones over David Hookes. They took in no specialist spinner. Clive Lloyd missed the game due to injury. The game was played at Albion in front of a crowd of 18,000 people, 5,000 more than capacity. The players were taken there from Georgetown via army helicopters.

Australia batted first and Wessels (44) and Smith (60) put on 106 for the opening partnership. Australia fell to 4-159 before Ritchie (46) and Dean Jones (43 off 43 balls) lead a recover to 5-231. Larry Gomes took 3-34 and Viv Richards 1-38.

The West Indies comfortably chased this total down for the loss of two wickets, headed by Haynes (133) and Richardson (61. Haynes was dropped on 51 and Richardson on 28 and 36. Newspaper reports singled out Greg Ritchie and Rodney Hogg in particular for poor fielding.

During the game spectators watched by climbing on the scoreboard; the scoreboard collapsed but no one was seriously injured.

Carl Rackemann suffered a muscle injury to the lower part of his back during his ten overs and it was thought he might have to be sent home.

== First Test ==
2–7 March 1984
(5-day match)
Scorecard

| Australia | v | West Indies |
| 279 (102.2 overs); GM Ritchie 78 (152); J Garner 6/75 (27.2 overs) | | 230 (78.4 overs); DL Haynes 60 (174); TG Hogan 4/56 (25 overs) |
| 273/9d (97 overs); WB Phillips 76 (202); J Garner 3/67 (24 overs) | | 250/0 (61 overs); CG Greenidge 120* (189) |

Match drawn
Bourda, Georgetown, Guyana
Umpires: DM Archer and DJ Narine

- Australia won the toss and elected to bat.
- 5 March was taken as a rest day.
- SB Smith (AUS) made his Test debut.

For the first test Australia went with six batters, a keeper, a spinner and three fast bowlers. Steve Smith, after his strong early tour form, was selected to make his test debut as opener with Kepler Wessels. Wayne Phillips would have been dropped but received a reprieve when Woolley's thumb did not heal and was picked as a wicketkeeper. Greg Ritchie and David Hookes occupied the batting slots that had been taken by Greg Chappell and Graham Yallop over the Australian summer (Hookes was picked over Jones because of the former's experience). Tom Hogan was spinner over Greg Matthews on the basis of the game against Guyana; Lawson, Hogg and Alderman constituted the pace attack (Alderman's first test since he was injured in 1982 and due to Rackemann's unavailability). Dean Jones was 12th man.

The West Indies were without Michael Holding and Malcolm Marshall, meaning the selectors decided to play a spinner, Roger Harper. Both Kim Hughes and Clive Lloyd said before the game that the most likely result would be a draw.

Australia batted first and at one stage were 9–182 (Ritchie 72) but then Rodney Hogg and Tom Hogan came together and decided to ignore Kim Hughes' instructions to hit out; they combined for a partnership of 97, a record tenth wicket stand for Australia against the West Indies, and took the total to 279.

The West Indies were then dismissed for 230 (Haynes 60, Hogan 4-56). There was an incident when Geoff Lawson had an labw decision off Haynes turned down and he snatched his hat off umpire Denis Narine.When Australia batted again they were 5-60 but efforts from Border (54) and Phillips (76) took them to 273. Hughes declared after batting 90 minutes on the last day, setting the West Indies 323 to win.

Haynes and Greenidge batted well and made 171 off the first 45 overs, leaving them 152 runs to get off the last 20 overs. However they decided not to go for it, and the innings ended on 0-250. Clive Lloyd later said 'It was difficult to play shots when the ball was keeping low - i was just not worthwhile having a go in those conditions." The total of 250-0 is still the only Test innings in which all who batted scored a century (Gordon Greenidge 120* and Desmond Haynes 103*). Man of the Match was Tom Hogan.

Geoff Lawson was later fined £150 by the Australian team management for the hat snatching incident.

=== Trinidad & Tobago Game - Kim Hughes controversy ===
Australia then flew to Trinidad & Tobago, where they played a tour game against the local side. Dean Jones missed the game due to haemmeroids and Carl Rackemann was still unavailable due to injury.

Trinidad & Tobago batted first and scored 336 (Rajah 100, Maguire 4-67). Australia made 373 in reply (Wessels 89, Hughes 73). Batting second the local side were 8-170 but Ranjy Nana and Harold Joseph put on 50 off 29 balls and took the total to 222 (Hogan 4-74). Since rain washed out the third day's play, Australia were set 189 runs to win off 23 overs.

Australian captain Kim Hughes was upset the local captain did not declare and set a winnable total. He opened the batting with Greg Matthews and made only two scoring shots (a six and a four) in a 75-minute innings of 10. He refused to take singles. Greg Matthews followed in a similar fashion, as did Wayne Phillips, who took off his pads for the last over and lay down for the last ball. "What I have seen today is one of the sad days for me in cricket," said former West Indian captain Gerry Gomez. "The performance of Kim Hughes and the Australian team today represented what I consider a travesty of the game of cricket." At a press conference after the game Hughes said "Why should touring sides carry the bag for local teams without imagination. I am not really interested in the welfare of Trinidad cricket. I am interested in the welfare of West Indian crowds."

Peter McFarline wrote:

Hughes, who has worked hard to give a new direction to the Australian team since taking over as captain... has lost many supporters... it is a pity the majority of members of this touring side just cannot come to terms with the reality of playing cricket in another country with different styles, beliefs, cultures and characteristics from the ones they are used to... This team fondly believe they are a collection of professional players. On the strength of their performance on Monday, under the leadership of Hughes, they are still strictly amateurs."

Hughes was fined $200 by team management.

== 2nd ODI ==
14 March 1984
Scorecard

| West Indies; 190/6 (37 overs) | v | Australia; 194/6 (36.4 overs) |
| IVA Richards 67 (73); GF Lawson 2/40 (9 overs) | | KC Wessels 67 (95); J Garner 1/24 (9.4 overs) |

Australia won by 4 wickets
Queen's Park Oval, Port of Spain, Trinidad
Umpires: LH Barker and S Mohammed
Player of the match: KC Wessels (AUS)

- Australia won the toss and elected to field.
- The match was reduced from 50 overs to 37 overs per side.

However the Australian team bounced back in the second one-day international, beating the West Indies in a rain-shortened game.

Australia won the toss and sent in the West Indies who made 6-190. The best of the bowlers was John Maguire. Australia made this total in the last over, helped by Wessels (67) and the fact the West Indies bowlers gave away so many extras (29).

== Second Test ==
16–21 March 1984
(5-day match)
Scorecard

| Australia | v | West Indies |
| 255 (92.1 overs); AR Border 98* (314); J Garner 6/60 (28.1 overs) | | 468/8d (126 overs); PJL Dujon 130 (187); TM Alderman 2/91 (35 overs) |
| 299/9 (112.1 overs); AR Border 100* (269); IVA Richards 2/65 (25 overs) |

Match drawn
Queen's Park Oval, Port of Spain, Trinidad
Umpires: DM Archer and CE Cumberbatch
Player of the match: AR Border (AUS)

- West Indies won the toss and elected to field.
- 19 March was taken as a rest day.
- DM Jones (AUS) and MA Small (WIN) made their Test debuts.

The second test match saw Smith pulled out due to injury, replaced by Dean Jones, who made his test debut. Wayne Phillips was kept as keeper but also had to open. Viv Richards led the West Indies in the place of the injured Clive Lloyd. Jones later recalled:

On the night of my first Test in Trinidad, I was struck down with the worst virus. My roommate was Geoff Lawson. He rightly said he didn't want me in his room for fear of catching the virus. Our manager at the time, Colin Egar, said the ACB wouldn't pay for another room. So I slept in the corridor outside my room for three nights until I was well. Can you believe a Test cricketer sleeping in the corridor during his first Test?

Australia batted first and the top order collapsed again, falling to 5-85 before Allan Border (98) and Dean Jones (48) combined to put on a stand of 100, helping take the total to 255 (Garner 6-60). Jones later described his first innings score of 48 as his "best knock" in test cricket.

In response the West Indies are one stage were 4-129 but recovered due to Richards (76), Logie (97) and Dujon (130) to declare at 8-468. Australia's top order collapsed again to 5-115 then 9-238 but Allan Border (100) partnered with Terry Alderman (21) to ensure they escaped with a draw. This effort by Border is one of his greatest feats with the bat. Border hit the last ball of the match for a boundary to bring up his century.

Hughes addressed the Trinidad controversy after the game saying "In hindsight, I should have added something when I said I didn't care for Trinidad cricket. I should have added 'If that's the way they play the game here'. If people have got the wrong impression from what I said, then I am sorry."

=== Australia vs Barbados ===
Kepler Wessels injured his knee while fielding during the test match and was sent home; he flew from Barbados to Sydney where he was operated on. Graeme Wood was flown out as a replacement and arrived on 21 March, playing in the next tour game against Barbados (Hughes insisted he be acclimatised if he was to play the third test). Phillips played as a batter while Woolley kept.

Australia, using only two bowling specialists (Maguire and Rackemann) batted first and declared at 6-332 (Ritchie 99, Wood 76), Roger Woolley scoring a half-century off 43 balls.

Barbados was dismissed for 302, Matthews, Maguire and Rackemann each taking three wickets. Australia made 4-356 in their second innings, headed by David Hookes' 103 and half centuries to Smith and Hughes, before declaring (his declaration enabled Hookes to make a century). Hookes and Phillips put on 113 runs in 68 minutes.

Barbados were set 387 to win in 20 overs and 222 minutes. At the end of play it was 5-233. Peter McFarline wrote "Greg Ritchie made everyone laugh with his famous impersonations in the final oval of the match."

== Third Test ==
30 March–4 April 1984
(5-day match)
Scorecard

| Australia | v | West Indies |
| 429 (149.5 overs); WB Phillips 120 (197); J Garner 3/110 (33.5 overs) | | 509 (145.4 overs); DL Haynes 145 (222); RM Hogg 6/77 (32.4 overs) |
| 97 (43.5 overs); KJ Hughes 25; MD Marshall 5/42 (15.5 overs) | | 21/0 (3.4 overs); DL Haynes 11* |

West Indies won by 10 wickets
Kensington Oval, Bridgetown, Barbados
Umpires: DM Archer and LH Barker
Player of the match: MD Marshall (WIN)

- West Indies won the toss and elected to field.
- 2 April was taken as a rest day.

The turning point of the tour came with the third test. Dean Jones made way for Steve Smith, back in the side from injury, with Phillips still as keeper but pushed back down the order. Graeme Wood replaced an injured Kepler Wessels as opener. Wessels flew back to Australia.

Australia batted extremely well in the first innings. Wood (68) and Ritchie (57) took Australia to 1-114. There was a minor collapse, going to 6-263 but Wayne Phillips scored 120, including four sixes, taking the total to 429. At the end of day three the West Indies were 3–301 in reply and it seemed the game was headed for a draw. (Richardson and Greenidge, who both scored centuries, had been dropped early on in their respective innings.) Peter McFarline thought Phillips had batted Australia to a "position from where it cannot lose the match".

However Clive Lloyd then hit 76 off 77 balls, taking the West Indies to 509 and giving them a lead. By the end of day four Australia were 4-68; they lost the next four wickets quickly the following day, all out of 95. The West Indies won by ten wickets.

Graeme Wood fractured his finger during the game and had to return home from the tour.

== Fourth Test ==
7–11 April 1984
(5-day match)
Scorecard

| Australia | v | West Indies |
| 262 (96.5 overs); AR Border 98 (202); MA Holding 3/42 (19.5 overs) | | 498 (145.4 overs); IVA Richards 178 (229); CG Rackemann 5/161 (42.4 overs) |
| 200 (65.5 overs); Extras 36; KJ Hughes 29 (73); DW Hookes 29 (44); J Garner 5/63 (20.5 overs) |

West Indies won by an innings and 36 runs
Antigua Recreation Ground, St. John's, Antigua and Barbuda
Umpires: DM Archer and AE Weekes
Player of the match: IVA Richards (WIN)

- Australia won the toss and elected to bat.
- 10 April was taken as a rest day.
- The match was scheduled for five days but completed in four.

For the fourth test Australia brought in Roger Woolley as wicketkeeper letting Phillips play as a specialist batter. Rodney Hogg was injured and missed the game. Australia used its third opening combination for the series, Philips and Ritchie.

Australia batted first. At one stage they were 4-78 then Border (98) and Hookes (51) took the score to 4-202 and the final total was 262. Richardson (154) and Richards (178) put on a 308 run partnership in 377 minutes taking the West Indies to 2-351. The Australian bowlers managed to restrict the West Indies to 498 (Rackeman 5-161). At one stage Rackemann bowled 24 overs unchanged. Roger Woolley dropped Richardson off Lawson's bowling when the batter was only 38 and the West Indies 2-100.

Australia had to bat for two days to save the match. They were dismissed for 200 (Garner 5-63), no Australian batter scoring more than 29 and the top score being 36 sundries. This meant the West Indies retained the Sir Frank Worrell Trophy.

=== Australia vs Windward Islands ===
Australia went to St Lucia and played against Windward Islands. Hogg, Lawson and Phillips were rested. Australia batted first and Steve Smith scored 127 of 167 deliveries, taking part in a 122 run opening stand in 103 minutes with Greg Matthews (54); the total was 362. Hughes was dropped on 5 and 9 but only made 22.

Windward Islands made 337 in response, Hookes taking 3-114. The innings was highlighted by the antics of local batter Linton Lewis. Australia made 6-344 in their second innings (Jones 95, Hookes 74) before declaring. Dean Jones opened after Greg Matthews was injured. Windward Island were 3-190 when the game ended.

== 3rd ODI ==
Further centuries from Desmond Haynes saw the West Indies comfortably win the third and fourth one day internationals.

19 April 1984
Scorecard

| Australia; 206/9 (45 overs) | v | West Indies; 208/3 (41.4 overs) |
| AR Border 90 (141); MD Marshall 4/34 (10 overs) | | DL Haynes 102* (142); JN Maguire 2/57 (10 overs) |

West Indies won by 7 wickets
Mindoo Phillip Park, Castries, Saint Lucia
Umpires: S Mohammed and PC Whyte
Player of the match: DL Haynes (WIN)

- West Indies won the toss and elected to field.
- The match was reduced before from 50 overs to 45 overs per side.
- TRO Payne (WIN) made his ODI debut.

== 4th ODI ==
26 April 1984
Scorecard

| Australia; 209/7 (50 overs) | v | West Indies; 211/1 (47.4 overs) |
| GM Ritchie 84 (129); J Garner 3/47 (10 overs) | | DL Haynes 104* (102); JN Maguire 1/16 (6 overs) |

West Indies won by 9 wickets
Sabina Park, Kingston, Jamaica
Umpires: LH Barker and JR Gayle
Player of the match: DL Haynes (WIN)

- West Indies won the toss and elected to field.

== Fifth Test ==
28 April–2 May 1984
(5-day match)
Scorecard

| Australia | v | West Indies |
| 199 (78 overs); AR Border 41 (104); MD Marshall 3/37 (18 overs) | | 305 (94.4 overs); CG Greenidge 127 (193); JN Maguire 4/57 (16.4 overs) |
| 160 (67.4 overs); AR Border 60* (191); MD Marshall 5/51 (23 overs) | | 55/0 (11.2 overs); CG Greenidge 32* (44) |

West Indies won by 10 wickets
Sabina Park, Kingston, Jamaica
Umpires: DM Archer and LH Barker
Player of the match: CG Greenidge (WIN)

- West Indies won the toss and elected to field.
- 1 May was taken as a rest day.
- The match was scheduled for five days but completed in four.

For the fifth test, Australia tried to bolster the bowling by using Greg Matthews as a fifth bowler and playing Phillips as a wicketkeeper again. It did not work and the West Indies won by ten wickets. Steve Smith was injured and could not bat in Australia's second innings.

== Conclusion ==
The tour had been a disastrous one for Australia, despite some encouraging early performances. The only players who could have been said to return with their reputations enhanced were Allan Border and Wayne Phillips; Peter McFarline spoke well of Geoff Lawson and Tom Hogan. McFarline said "Woolley's tour with the gloves has been as poor as I have seen in this class of cricket. It resulted in Wayne Phillips, a man of talent but not yet with the capacity to understand that talent, being placed in the position of keeping as well as opening the batting."

Phillips' relative success as wicketkeeper encouraged the Australian selectors to persist with him in that position for the next two summers with ultimately disastrous consequences for Phillips' career and the Australian team.

Australia's senior players were seen to have let them down: Hughes, Hookes, Rackemann, Hogg. Kim Hughes' failures with the bat were instrumental in him resigning the captaincy in November 1984. Allan Border later remembered:

By the end of the tour Kim was really feeling the pinch. At one stage we were in Jamaica, at Montego Bay, and we'd had the day off and been on the beach. We came back to the team hotel and there's Kim, half cut watching the Donald Duck show or something with his hair all braided and with those coloured balls hanging off. I thought then: 'Kim, you've lost the plot."'

Ian Chappell, a long time critic of Hughes' captaincy, later wrote:

Hughes has suffered a string of defeats as Australia's captain on foreign soil but this latest one makes his job of trying to drag the side up by his bootstraps an impossible one, and I think the ACB has to offer the job to Allan Border.

Dean Jones said the team had poor culture:

An example of the bad culture within our team came when one of our front-line bowlers got very upset when he didn't get the new ball. He was furious that he was selected to bowl first change. This particular bowler took our first wicket for the match. When everyone ran in to congratulate him, he threw a haymaker punch at our captain, Kim Hughes. When asked to explain his actions by Hughes, the bowler's response was, I got a wicket for ya, and walked back to his mark. Oh yes, things were very different than.

However at the time there were many positive reports about the Australian team culture. Peter McFarline called the squad "the fittest tourists for many years, perhaps ever." It was the first tour by physiotherapist Errol Alcott, who became an integral part of the side.
