= New Zealand cricket team in the West Indies in 1984–85 =

International cricket tour

The New Zealand national cricket team toured the West Indies from March to May 1985 and played a four-match Test series against the West Indies cricket team, which the West Indies won 2–0. New Zealand were captained by Geoff Howarth; the West Indies, by Viv Richards.

== Test series summary ==
=== First Test ===
29 March–3 April 1985
(5–day match)
Scorecard

West Indies	v	New Zealand
307 (106.3 overs); CG Greenidge 100 (235); EJ Chatfield 4/51 (28 overs)		262 (100.3 overs); JJ Crowe 64 (96); MA Holding 4/79 (29 overs)
261/8d (72 overs); DL Haynes 78 (176); IVA Richards 78 (89); EJ Chatfield 6/73 (22 overs)		187/6 (81 overs); JV Coney 44 (110); MD Marshall 4/65 (26 overs)

Match drawn
Queen's Park Oval, Port of Spain, Trinidad
Umpires: DM Archer and CE Cumberbatch
Player of the match: IVA Richards (WIN) and EJ Chatfield (NZ)

- West Indies won the toss and elected to bat.
- 1 April was taken as a rest day.
- KR Rutherford (NZ) made his Test debut.

=== Second Test ===
6–11 April 1985
(5–day match)
Scorecard

West Indies	v	New Zealand
511/6d (152.5 overs); RB Richardson 185 (346); RJ Hadlee 2/83 (25.5 overs)		440 (151.5 overs); MD Crowe 188 (462); MD Marshall 4/110 (33 overs)
268/6d (95 overs); CG Greenidge 69 (167); RJ Hadlee 2/32 (16 overs)

Match drawn
Bourda, Georgetown, Guyana
Umpires: LH Barker and DJ Narine
Player of the match: MD Crowe (NZ)

- West Indies won the toss and elected to bat.
- 9 April was taken as a rest day.
- CG Butts (WIN) made his Test debut.

=== Third Test ===
26 April–1 May 1985
(5–day match)
Scorecard

New Zealand	v	West Indies
94 (47.4 overs); RJ Hadlee 29 (55); MD Marshall 4/40 (15 overs)		336 (93.1 overs); IVA Richards 105 (147); RJ Hadlee 3/86 (26 overs)
248 (80.3 overs); JV Coney 83 (176); MD Marshall 7/80 (25.3 overs)		10/0 (1.4 overs); DL Haynes 5* (2)

West Indies won by 10 wickets
Kensington Oval, Bridgetown, Barbados
Umpires: DM Archer and LH Barker
Player of the match: MD Marshall (WIN)

- West Indies won the toss and elected to field.
- 29 April was taken as a rest day.

=== Fourth Test ===
4–8 May 1985
(5–day match)
Scorecard

West Indies	v	New Zealand
363 (116.4 overs); DL Haynes 76 (131); RJ Hadlee 4/53 (28.4 overs)		138 (55.5 overs); JG Wright 53 (145); WW Davis 4/19 (13.5 overs)
59/0 (17 overs); CG Greenidge 33* (52)		283 (f/o) (102.4 overs); JJ Crowe 112 (206); MD Marshall 4/66 (28.4 overs)

West Indies won by 10 wickets
Sabina Park, Kingston, Jamaica
Umpires: DM Archer and JR Gayle
Player of the match: MD Marshall (WIN)

- New Zealand won the toss and elected to field.
- 7 May was taken as a rest day.
- The match was scheduled for five days but completed in four.

== One Day Internationals (ODIs) ==
The West Indies won the series 5-0.

=== 1st ODI ===
20 March 1985
Scorecard

West Indies; 231/8 (46 overs)	v	New Zealand; 208/8 (46 overs)
IVA Richards 70 (85); JV Coney 3/63 (10 overs)		JJ Crowe 52 (85); MA Holding 3/33 (10 overs)

West Indies won by 23 runs
Antigua Recreation Ground, St. John's, Antigua
Umpires: AE Weekes and PC Whyte
Player of the match: RA Harper (WIN)

- New Zealand won the toss and elected to field.
- The match was reduced to 46 overs per side.
- RT Hart (NZL) made his ODI debut.

=== 2nd ODI ===
27 March 1985
Scorecard

New Zealand; 51/3 (22 overs)	v	West Indies; 55/4 (17 overs)
MD Crowe 20* (65); WW Davis 3/7 (6 overs)		IVA Richards 27 (40); GB Troup 2/22 (5 overs)

West Indies won by 6 wickets
Queen's Park Oval, Port of Spain, Trinidad
Umpires: CE Cumberbatch and S Mohammed
Player of the match: WW Davis (WIN)

- West Indies won the toss and elected to field.
- The match was reduced to 22 overs per side.
- KR Rutherford (NZL) made his ODI debut.

=== 3rd ODI ===
14 April 1985
Scorecard

West Indies; 259/5 (50 overs)	v	New Zealand; 129 (48.1 overs)
DL Haynes 145* (157); GB Troup 1/28 (7 overs)		BL Cairns 33 (28); J Garner 2/16 (6 overs)

West Indies won by 130 runs
Albion Sports Complex, Albion, Guyana
Umpires: LH Barker and DJ Narine
Player of the match: DL Haynes (WIN)

- New Zealand won the toss and elected to field.

=== 4th ODI ===
17 April 1985
Scorecard

New Zealand; 116 (42.2 overs)	v	West Indies; 117/0 (24.2 overs)
RJ Hadlee 41 (102); J Garner 4/10 (6 overs)		DL Haynes 85* (86)

West Indies won by 10 wickets
Queen's Park Oval, Port of Spain, Trinidad
Umpires: CE Cumberbatch and S Mohammed
Player of the match: J Garner (WIN)

- West Indies won the toss and elected to field.

=== 5th ODI ===
23 April 1985
Scorecard

West Indies; 265/3 (49 overs)	v	New Zealand; 153/8 (49 overs)
DL Haynes 116 (138); EJ Chatfield 2/61 (10 overs)		IDS Smith 37 (28); WW Davis 3/32 (8 overs)

West Indies won by 112 runs
Kensington Oval, Bridgetown, Barbados
Umpires: DM Archer and LH Barker
Player of the match: DL Haynes (WIN)

- New Zealand won the toss and elected to field.
- The match was reduced to 49 overs per side.
