= English cricket team in the West Indies in 1985–86 =

International cricket tour

English cricket team in West Indies in 1985-86
	England	West Indies
- Dates: 18 February – 16 April 1986
Captains	David Gower	Viv Richards

Test series
- Result: West Indies won the 5-match series 5–0
Most runs	David Gower (370)	Desmond Haynes (469)
Most wickets	John Emburey (14)	Joel Garner (27); Malcolm Marshall (27)
- Player of the series: Malcolm Marshall (WI)

One Day International series
- Results: West Indies won the 4-match series 3–1
Most runs	Graham Gooch (181)	Richie Richardson (204)
Most wickets	Neil Foster (6)	Malcolm Marshall (11)

The England national cricket team toured the West Indies from February to April 1986 and played a five-match Test series against the West Indies cricket team which the West Indies won 5–0. England were captained by David Gower; the West Indies by Viv Richards. In addition, the teams played a four-match One Day International (ODI) series which the West Indies won 3–1.

== Background ==
England had just beaten Australia 3–1 in the 1985 Ashes. As with the 1980–81 tour, Guyana’s government rigidly refused to admit cricketers who had ever played in apartheid South Africa, so England did not visit there. Antigua Sports Minister Lester Bird wished leading rebel player Graham Gooch to apologise and to promise he would never return to South Africa until apartheid was dismantled. To compensate two Tests were scheduled for Queen's Park Oval in Trinidad, but for a time it was feared that the government there would follow Guyana and Bird and exclude or demand apologies from those linked to South Africa.

== Tour ==
The tour began poorly for England, losing by seven wickets to the Windward Islands despite a 77 from Mike Gatting and five wickets from Phil Edmonds. They almost lost their next game, against the Leeward Islands. After batting well in the first innings (Gatting, Gooch, Robinson and Lamb all scoring half centuries) England collapsed in the second and were lucky to escape with a draw.

Things improved when they beat Jamaica, chiefly due to the batting of Gatting and Lamb and the bowling of Edmonds.

Gatting had been England's in-form batsman, but in the first one-day game his nose was broken. England collapsed and the West Indies won easily.

Gatting was unable to play in the first test, which the West Indies won easily. Richard Ellison took a five wicket haul and Peter Willey scored a second innings 71, forcing the West Indies to bat again, but England were unable to resist the West Indies fast bowlers, especially debutant Patrick Patterson, and the game was over inside three days.

England's next game, against Trinidad and Tobago, was a draw.

They bounced back to win their next game, a one-day international against the West Indies due to a century from Graham Gooch.

For the Second Test England decided to go with four specialist batsmen and lost the game. England's star players (especially Ian Botham) continued to struggle, while Richie Richardson made a century and Malcolm Marshall took eight wickets. Assisted by John Emburey's bowling and a last wicket stand from Richard Ellison and Greg Thomas, England managed to take the match into a fifth day and take three of the mere five second-innings West Indies wickets they would take all series, but these were meagre achievements.

The tour went downhill even further when they lost to Barbados by three wickets.

The West Indies easily won the next one day international. They won the 3rd test by an innings and 30 runs. Then they won the 4th ODI by eight wickets.

The West Indies won the 4th test by ten wickets. They won the 5th handsomely as well, Viv Richards scoring a century in 56 balls, which was at the time the fastest in terms of balls faced in Test match history.

== Touring party ==
England
Name	Style	Domestic team
Captain and Batsman
David Gower	LHB, OB	Leicestershire
Wicketkeepers
Paul Downton	RHB	Middlesex
Bruce French	RHB	Nottinghamshire
Batsmen
Mike Gatting	RHB, RM	Middlesex
Graham Gooch	RHB, RM	Essex
Allan Lamb	RHB, RM	Northamptonshire
Tim Robinson	RHB, RM	Nottinghamshire
Wilf Slack	LHB, RM	Middlesex
David Smith	LHB, RM	Worcestershire
All-Rounders
Ian Botham	RHB, RFM	Somerset
Peter Willey	RHB, OB	Leicestershire
Spin Bowlers
Phil Edmonds	RHB, SLA	Middlesex
John Emburey	RHB, OB	Middlesex
Fast Bowlers
Richard Ellison	LHB, RFM	Kent
Neil Foster	RHB, RFM	Essex
Les Taylor	RHB, RFM	Leicestershire
Greg Thomas	RHB, RF	Glamorgan

== Test series ==
=== 1st Test ===
21–23 February
Scorecard

England	v	West Indies
159 (45.3 overs); Graham Gooch 51 (88); Patrick Patterson 4/30 (11 overs)		307 (107.5 overs); Gordon Greenidge 58 (95); Richard Ellison 5/78 (33 overs)
152 (42.5 overs); Peter Willey 71 (104); Joel Garner 3/22 (9 overs)		5/0 (1 over); Desmond Haynes 4* (6)

West Indies won by 10 wickets
Sabina Park, Kingston, Jamaica
Umpires: David Archer (WI) and Johnny Gayle (WI)
Player of the match: Patrick Patterson (WI)

- England won the toss and elected to bat.
- David Smith, Greg Thomas (both Eng), Carlisle Best and Patrick Patterson (both WI) all made their Test debuts.

=== 2nd Test ===
7–12 March
Scorecard

England	v	West Indies
176 (44.4 overs); David Gower 66 (79); Malcolm Marshall 4/38 (15 overs)		399 (104.4 overs); Richie Richardson 102 (140); John Emburey 5/78 (27 overs)
315 (104.2 overs); David Gower 47 (74); Courtney Walsh 4/74 (27 overs)		95/3 (30.3 overs); Gordon Greenidge 45 (55); John Emburey 2/36 (10 overs)

West Indies won by 7 wickets
Queen's Park Oval, Port of Spain, Trinidad
Umpires: David Archer (WI) and Clyde Cumberbatch (WI)
Player of the match: Malcolm Marshall (WI)

- West Indies won the toss and elected to field.
- Wilf Slack (Eng) and Thelston Payne (WI) made their Test debuts.

=== 3rd Test ===
21–25 March
Scorecard

West Indies	v	England
418 (126.1 overs); Richie Richardson 160 (278); Greg Thomas 4/70 (16.1 overs)		199 (52.4 overs); Tim Robinson 43 (71); Joel Garner 4/69 (17 overs)
		189 (59 overs) (f/o); David Gower 66 (73); Malcolm Marshall 4/42 (14 overs)

West Indies won by an innings and 30 runs
Kensington Oval, Bridgetown, Barbados
Umpires: David Archer (WI) and Lloyd Barker (WI)
Player of the match: Richie Richardson (WI)

- England won the toss and elected to field.
- Monday 24 March was a rest day.

=== 4th Test ===
3–5 April
Scorecard

England	v	West Indies
200 (65.4 overs); David Smith 47 (79); Joel Garner 4/43 (18 overs)		312 (90.1 overs); Viv Richards 87 (110); Ian Botham 5/71 (24.1 overs)
150 (38 overs); David Smith 32 (48); Joel Garner 3/15 (9 overs)		39/0 (5.5 overs); Richie Richardson 22* (15)

West Indies won by 10 wickets
Queen's Park Oval, Port of Spain, Trinidad
Umpires: Clyde Cumberbatch (WI) and Sadique Mohammed (WI)
Player of the match: Viv Richards (WI)

- West Indies won the toss and elected to field.

=== 5th Test ===
11–16 April
Scorecard

West Indies	v	England
474 (134.3 overs); Desmond Haynes 131 (283); Neil Foster 2/86 (28 overs)		310 (107.4 overs); David Gower 90 (104); Joel Garner 4/67 (21.4 overs)
246/2d (43 overs); Viv Richards 110* (58); John Emburey 1/83 (14 overs)		170 (79.1 overs); Graham Gooch 51 (143); Roger Harper 3/10 (12 overs)

West Indies won by 240 runs
Antigua Recreation Ground, St John's, Antigua
Umpires: Clyde Cumberbatch (WI) and Lloyd Barker (WI)
Player of the match: Viv Richards (WI)

- England won the toss and elected to field.
- Monday 14 April was a rest day.

== One Day Internationals (ODIs) ==
West Indies won the series 3–1.

=== 1st ODI ===
18 February 1986
Scorecard

England; 145/8 (46 overs)	v	West Indies; 146/4 (43.5 overs)
GA Gooch 36 (72); MD Marshall 4/23 (10 overs)		CG Greenidge 45 (80); GA Gooch 1/0 (2 overs)

West Indies won by 6 wickets
Sabina Park, Kingston, Jamaica
Umpires: DM Archer and AJ Gaynor
Player of the match: MD Marshall (WIN)

- West Indies won the toss and elected to field.
- The match was reduced to 46 overs per side.
- LB Taylor and JG Thomas (both ENG) and BP Patterson (WIN) made their ODI debuts.

=== 2nd ODI ===
4 March 1986
Scorecard

West Indies; 229/3 (37 overs)	v	England; 230/5 (37 overs)
IVA Richards 82 (39); NA Foster 1/42 (10 overs)		GA Gooch 129* (118); J Garner 3/62 (9 overs)

England won by 5 wickets
Queen's Park Oval, Port of Spain, Trinidad
Umpires: CE Cumberbatch and S Mohammed
Player of the match: GA Gooch (ENG)

- England won the toss and elected to field.
- The match was reduced to 37 overs per side.
- WN Slack and DM Smith (both ENG), and CA Best (WIN) made their ODI debuts.

=== 3rd ODI ===
19 March 1986
Scorecard

West Indies; 249/7 (46 overs)	v	England; 114 (39 overs)
RB Richardson 62 (74); IVA Richards 62 (53); NA Foster 3/39 (9 overs)		RT Robinson 23 (42); MD Marshall 3/14 (6 overs)

West Indies won by 135 runs
Kensington Oval, Bridgetown, Barbados
Umpires: DM Archer and LH Barker
Player of the match: IVA Richards (WIN)

- England won the toss and elected to field.
- The match was reduced to 46 overs per side.

=== 4th ODI ===
31 March 1986
Scorecard

England; 165/9 (47 overs)	v	West Indies; 166/2 (38.2 overs)
RT Robinson 55 (107); MD Marshall 4/37 (9 overs)		DL Haynes 77* (114); NA Foster 1/27 (6 overs)

West Indies won by 8 wickets
Queen's Park Oval, Port of Spain, Trinidad
Umpires: CE Cumberbatch and S Mohammed
Player of the match: J Garner (WIN)

- West Indies won the toss and elected to field.
- The match was reduced to 47 overs per side.
