= 1985 Benson & Hedges Cup =

- Administrator: Test and County Cricket Board
- Cricket format: Limited overs cricket (55 overs per innings)
- Champions: Leicestershire (3rd title)
- Participants: 20
- Matches: 47
- Most runs: 430 Graham Gooch (Essex)
- Most wickets: 19 Neil Foster (Essex)

The 1985 Benson & Hedges Cup was the fourteenth edition of cricket's Benson & Hedges Cup.

The competition was won by Leicestershire County Cricket Club.

== Fixtures and results ==
=== Group stage ===
==== Group A ====
Team	Pld	W	L	NR	A	Pts	BowSR
Northamptonshire	4	2	0	2	0	6	40.958
Derbyshire	4	2	1	1	0	5	35.542
Nottinghamshire	4	2	1	1	0	5	39.760
Gloucestershire	4	2	2	0	0	4	40.938
Scotland	4	0	4	0	0	0	42.586

==== Group B ====
Team	Pld	W	L	NR	A	Pts	BowSR
Worcestershire	4	3	1	0	0	6	40.897
Leicestershire	4	3	1	0	0	6	48.480
Yorkshire	4	2	2	0	0	4	30.789
Lancashire	4	1	3	0	0	2	48.375
Warwickshire	4	1	3	0	0	2	52.958

==== Group C ====
Team	Pld	W	L	NR	A	Pts	BowSR
Essex	4	4	0	0	0	8	30.389
Middlesex	4	2	2	0	0	4	38.621
Surrey	4	2	2	0	0	4	43.778
Sussex	4	2	2	0	0	4	46.577
Oxford and Cambridge Universities	4	0	4	0	0	0	76.600

==== Group D ====
Team	Pld	W	L	NR	A	Pts	BowSR
Hampshire	4	4	0	0	0	8	28.605
Kent	4	3	1	0	0	6	33.194
Glamorgan	4	2	2	0	0	4	31.417
Somerset	4	1	3	0	0	2	39.448
Minor Counties	4	0	4	0	0	0	53.765

=== Quarter-finals ===
5, 6, 7 June 1985
(scorecard)

Derbyshire; 167/9 (55 overs)	v	Essex; 4/1 (1.4 overs)
Kim Barnett 60; Neil Foster 2/26 (11 overs)		Chris Gladwin 3* Michael Holding 1/1 (1 over)

No result
County Ground, Chelmsford
Umpires: Barrie Meyer & Alan Whitehead

- Match was scheduled for one day but extended to three. No play on first reserve day. Match was replaced with a 20-over match on second reserve day.

7 June 1985
(scorecard)

Essex; 150/4 (20 overs)	v	Derbyshire; 132/6 (20 overs)
Graham Gooch 72*; Alan Warner 2/41 (4 overs)		Bill Fowler 28; John Lever 2/23 (4 overs)

Essex won by 18 runs
County Ground, Chelmsford
Umpires: Barrie Meyer & Alan Whitehead
Player of the match: Graham Gooch (Essex)

- Match was reduced before play started to 20 overs per side.

5 June 1985
(scorecard)

Leicestershire; 243/4 (55 overs)	v	Hampshire; 239 all out (54.5 overs)
Chris Balderstone 60; Malcolm Marshall 1/38 (11 overs)		Robin Smith 81; Jonathan Agnew 3/38 (10.5 overs)

Leicestershire won by 4 runs
County Ground, Southampton
Umpires: David Constant & David Evans
Player of the match: Peter Willey (Leicestershire)

- Reserve day used. No play on first day.

5, 6, 7 June 1985
(scorecard)

Northamptonshire; 158/2 (34 overs)	v	Kent
Geoff Cook 78; Graham Dilley 1/21 (8 overs)

No result
County Ground, Northampton
Umpires: Dickie Bird & John Jameson

- Two reserve days used. Northamptonshire were 158/2 (34 overs) at the close of the first day's play. No play on either reserve day. Kent went through on better record in qualifying.

5, 6, 7 June 1985
(scorecard)

Worcestershire; 220 all out (54 overs)	v	Middlesex; 45/1 (13 overs)
David Smith 57; Wayne Daniel 3/26 (10 overs)		Wilf Slack 20*

No result
New Road, Worcester
Umpires: Ken Palmer & David Shepherd

- Two reserve days used. Worcestershire were 220 all out at the close of the first day's play. Middlesex were 45/1 (13 overs) at the close of the first reserve day's play. No play on the second reserve day. Middlesex went through on better record in qualifying.

=== Semi-finals ===
19, 20 June 1985
(scorecard)

Essex; 202/8 (55 overs)	v	Middlesex; 140 all out (46 overs)
Graham Gooch 58; John Emburey 4/36 (11 overs)		Wilf Slack 60; Stuart Turner 3/27 (11 overs)

Essex won by 62 runs
County Ground, Chelmsford
Umpires: Mervyn Kitchen & Alan Whitehead
Player of the match: John Emburey (Middlesex)

- Reserve day used. Essex were 114/4 (33 overs) at the close of the first day's play

19 June 1985
(scorecard)

Kent; 101 all out (45.5 overs)	v	Leicestershire; 102/2 (21.5 overs)
Eldine Baptiste 15; Les Taylor 3/16 (8.5 overs)		Ian Butcher 55; Kevin Jarvis 1/34 (6 overs)

Leicestershire won by 8 wickets
Grace Road, Leicester
Umpires: Barrie Leadbeater & David Shepherd
Player of the match: Paddy Clift (Leicestershire)

=== Final ===
20 July 1985
(scorecard)

Essex; 213/8 (55 overs)	v	Leicestershire; 215/5 (52 overs)
Graham Gooch 57; Les Taylor 3/26 (11 overs)		Peter Willey 86*; Graham Gooch 2/40 (10 overs)

Leicestershire won by 5 wickets
Lord's, London
Umpires: Dickie Bird & Ken Palmer
Player of the match: Peter Willey (Leicestershire)

== See also ==
Benson & Hedges Cup
