= English cricket team in the West Indies in 1980–81 =

International cricket tour

English cricket team in the West Indies in 1980/81
	West Indies	England
- Dates: 23 January 1981 – 15 April 1981
Captains	Clive Lloyd	Ian Botham

Test series
- Result: West Indies won the 5-match series 2–0
Most runs	Clive Lloyd (383); Viv Richards (340); Desmond Haynes (234)	Graham Gooch (460); David Gower (376); Geoffrey Boycott (295)
Most wickets	Colin Croft (24); Michael Holding (17)	Ian Botham (15); Graham Dilley (10)
- Player of the series: Clive Lloyd

The England national cricket team toured the West Indies from January to April 1981 and played a five-match Test series against the West Indies cricket team which the West Indies won 2–0. England were captained by Ian Botham; the West Indies by Clive Lloyd. The second Test of the tour was cancelled, after Robin Jackman's visa was revoked by the Guyanese government, for playing and coaching in South Africa. In the third Test, England's opening batsman Geoff Boycott was dismissed for a duck, after six balls bowled by Michael Holding. It has been described as the greatest over in Test cricket.

In addition, the teams played a two-match Limited Overs International (LOI) series which the West Indies won 2–0.

== Test series summary ==
=== First Test ===
13–18 February 1981
(5-day match)
Scorecard

West Indies	v	England
426/9d (147 overs); DL Haynes 96 (199); JE Emburey 5/124 (52 overs)		178 (78 overs); DI Gower 48 (140); CEH Croft 5/40 (22 overs)
		169 (f/o) (99 overs); G Boycott 70 (229); MA Holding 3/38 (18 overs)

West Indies won by an innings and 79 runs
Queen's Park Oval, Port of Spain, Trinidad
Umpires: CE Cumberbatch and D Sang Hue
Player of the match: CEH Croft (WIN)

- England won the toss and elected to field.
- 16 February was taken as a rest day.
- PR Downton (ENG) and EH Mattis (WIN) made their Test debuts.

=== Second Test ===
28 February–5 March 1981
(5-day match)
Scorecard

West Indies	v	England

Match cancelled
Bourda, Georgetown, Guyana
Umpires: CE Cumberbatch and CF Vyfhuis

- The match was cancelled when the Guyanese Government cancelled the visa of Robin Jackman who had previously played and coached in apartheid South Africa.
- 3 March was planned as a rest day.

=== Third Test ===
13–18 March 1981
(5-day match)
Scorecard

West Indies	v	England
265 (90.1 overs); CH Lloyd 100 (167); IT Botham 4/77 (25.1 overs)		122 (47.5 overs); GA Gooch 26 (35); IT Botham 26 (40); CEH Croft 4/39 (13.5 overs)
379/7d (109 overs); IVA Richards 182* (256); IT Botham 3/102 (29 overs)		224 (91.2 overs); GA Gooch 116 (210); CEH Croft 3/65 (19 overs)

West Indies won by 298 runs
Kensington Oval, Bridgetown, Barbados
Umpires: DM Archer and D Sang Hue
Player of the match: CH Lloyd (WIN)

- England won the toss and elected to field.
- 16 March was taken as a rest day.
- RO Butcher and RD Jackman (both ENG) made their Test debuts.

=== Fourth Test ===
27 March–1 April 1981
(5-day match)
Scorecard

England	v	West Indies
271 (90.2 overs); P Willey 102* (158); CEH Croft 6/74 (25 overs)		468/9d (155 overs); IVA Richards 114 (226); IT Botham 4/127 (37 overs)
234/3 (93 overs); G Boycott 104* (257); CEH Croft 2/39 (16 overs)

Match drawn
Antigua Recreation Ground, St. John's, Antigua and Barbuda
Umpires: DM Archer and S Mohammed
Player of the match: P Willey (ENG)

- England won the toss and elected to bat.
- 30 March was taken as a rest day.
- There was no play on the fourth day.

=== Fifth Test ===
10–15 April 1981
(5-day match)
Scorecard

England	v	West Indies
285 (83 overs); GA Gooch 153 (213); MA Holding 5/56 (18 overs)		442 (163.1 overs); CH Lloyd 95 (168); GR Dilley 4/116 (28.4 overs)
302/6d (128 overs); DI Gower 154* (403); MA Holding 2/58 (28 overs)

Match drawn
Sabina Park, Kingston, Jamaica
Umpires: CE Cumberbatch and D Sang Hue
Player of the match: GA Gooch (ENG)

- West Indies won the toss and elected to field.
- 13 April was taken as a rest day.

== One Day Internationals (ODIs) ==
=== 1st ODI ===
4 February 1981
Scorecard

West Indies; 127 (47.2 overs)	v	England; 125 (48.2 overs)
EH Mattis 62 (126); GA Gooch 2/12 (6 overs)		IT Botham 60 (108); CEH Croft 6/15 (9 overs)

West Indies won by 2 runs
Arnos Vale Playing Field, Kingstown, Saint Vincent and the Grenadines
Umpires: DM Archer and S Mohammed
Player of the match: CEH Croft (WIN)

- England won the toss and elected to field.
- EH Mattis (WIN) made his ODI debut.

=== 2nd ODI ===
26 February 1981
Scorecard

England; 137 (47.2 overs)	v	West Indies; 138/4 (39.3 overs)
MW Gatting 29 (50); CEH Croft 3/9 (6.2 overs)		DL Haynes 48 (77); JE Emburey 2/22 (10 overs)

West Indies won by 6 wickets
Albion Sports Complex, Albion, Guyana
Umpires: DJ Narine and CF Vyfhuis
Player of the match: HA Gomes (WIN)

- West Indies won the toss and elected to field.
