= List of England ODI cricketers =

Since their first match in 1971, 282 players have represented England in One Day Internationals (ODIs). A One Day International is an international cricket match between two representative teams, each having ODI status, as determined by the International Cricket Council (ICC). An ODI differs from Test matches in that the number of overs per team is limited, and that each team has only one innings. The first such match involved England and was played on 5 January 1971 between England and Australia. Where more than one player won his first ODI cap in the same match, those players are listed alphabetically by surname.

England have played 833 ODIs, resulting in 414 victories, 379 defeats, 9 ties and 31 no results.

== Key ==
General

- ‡ – Captain
- † – Wicket-keeper
- First – Year of ODI debut for England
- Last – Year of latest ODI for England
- Mat – Number of ODI appearances for England

Batting

- Runs – Runs scored in career
- HS – Highest score
- Avg – Runs scored per dismissal
- * – Batsman remained not out

Bowling

- Balls – Balls bowled in career
- Wkt – Wickets taken in career
- BBI – Best bowling in an innings
- Ave – Average runs per wicket

Fielding

- Ca – Catches taken
- St – Stumpings effected

== Players ==
Statistics are correct as of 29 October 2026.

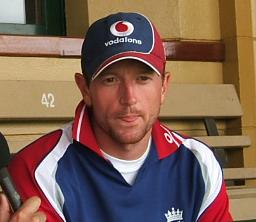
Paul Collingwood played in 197 ODI matches, the third most of any England player, after Eoin Morgan (225) and Jos Buttler (204).

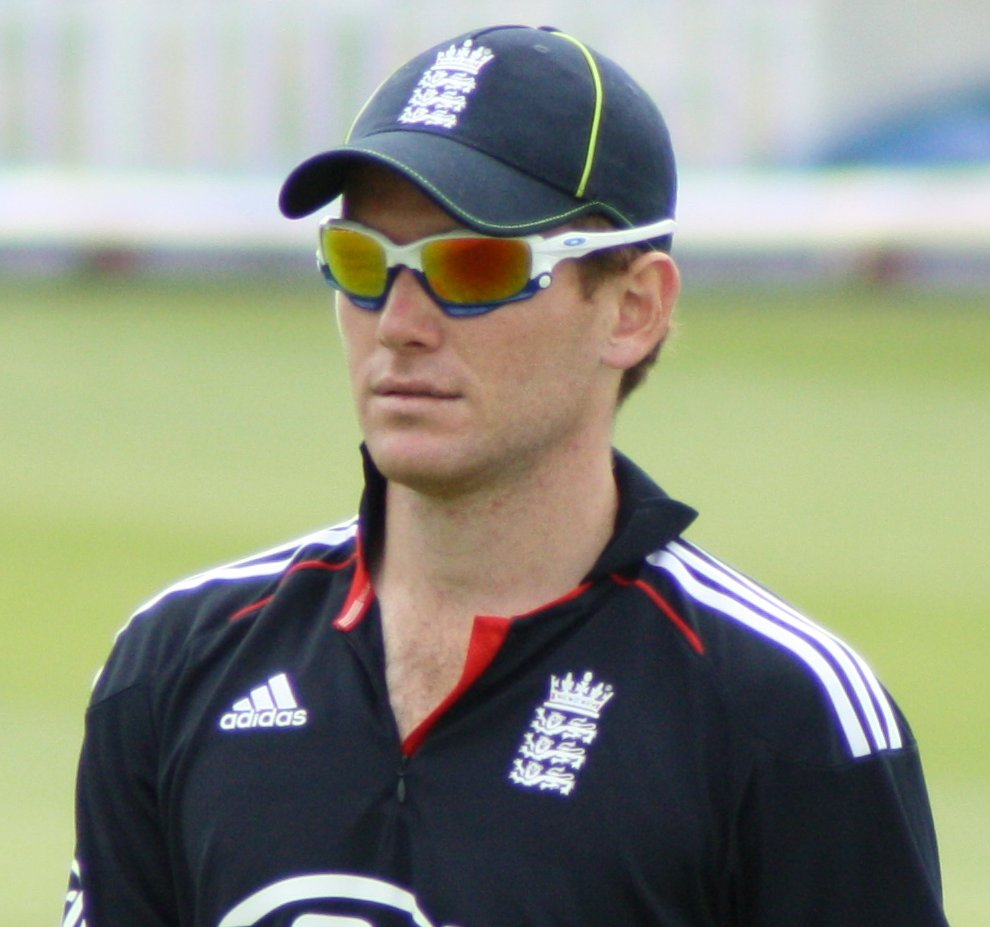
Eoin Morgan scored 6,957 runs, the second most of any England player, and one of only two English players to reach 200 ODI caps.

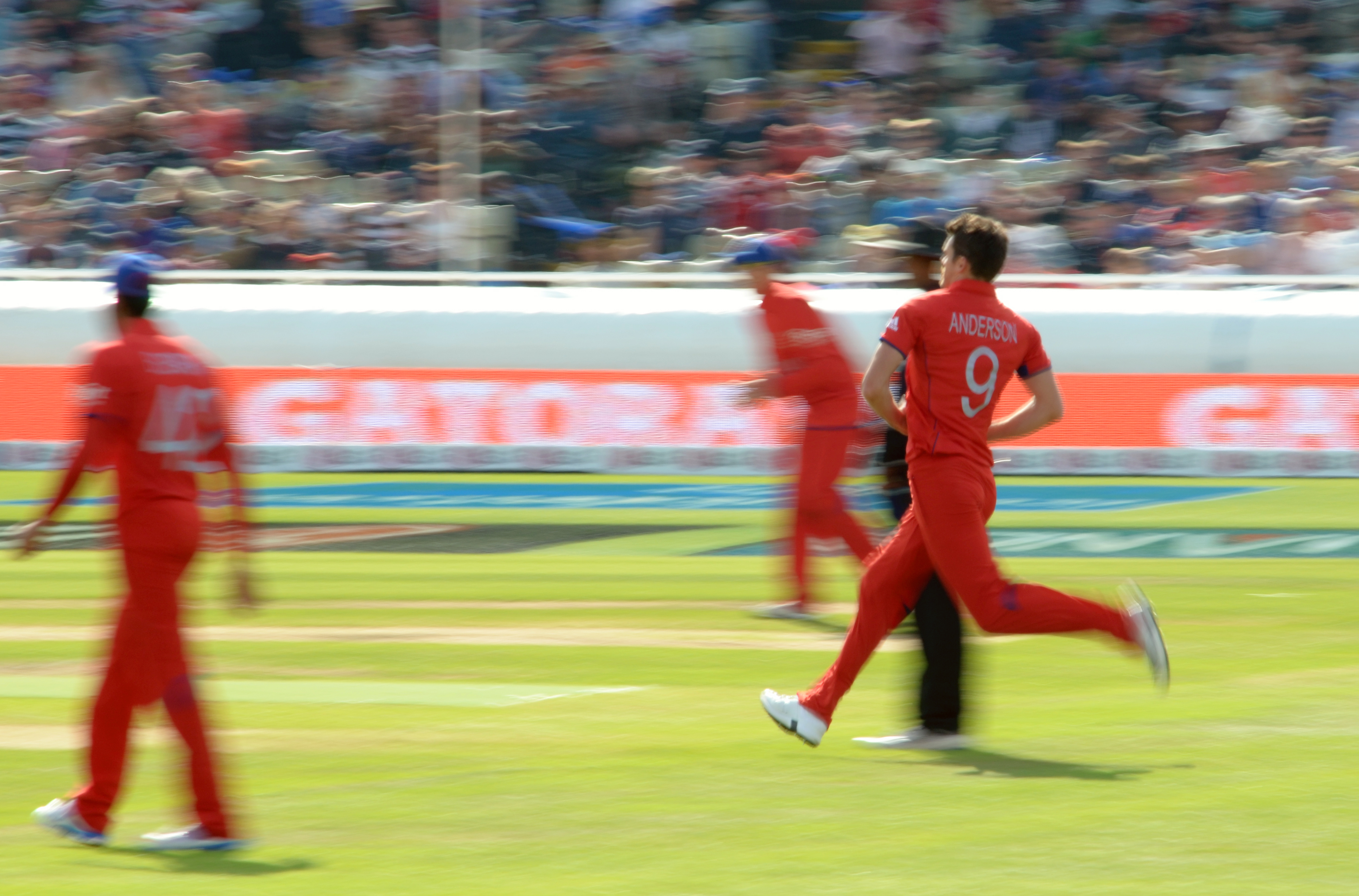
James Anderson took 269 wickets, the most of any England player.

England ODI cricketers
| Cap | Name | First | Last | Mat | Runs | HS | Avg | Balls | Wkt | BBI | Ave | Ca | St | Ref(s) |
| Cap | Name | First | Last | Mat | Batting | | | Bowling | | | | Fielding | | Ref(s) |
|---|---|---|---|---|---|---|---|---|---|---|---|---|---|---|
| 1 | Geoffrey Boycott ‡ | 1971 | 1981 | 36 | 1,082 | 105 | 36.06 | 168 | 5 | 2/14 | 21.00 | 5 | 0 | |
| 2 | Colin Cowdrey | 1971 | 1971 | 1 | 1 | 1 | 1.00 | 0 | – | – | – | 0 | 0 | |
| 3 | Basil D'Oliveira | 1971 | 1972 | 4 | 30 | 17 | 10.00 | 204 | 3 | 1/19 | 46.66 | 1 | 0 | |
| 4 | John Edrich ‡ | 1971 | 1975 | 7 | 223 | 90 | 37.16 | 0 | – | – | – | 0 | 0 | |
| 5 | Keith Fletcher ‡ | 1971 | 1982 | 24 | 757 | 131 | 39.84 | 0 | – | – | – | 4 | 0 | |
| 6 | John Hampshire | 1971 | 1972 | 3 | 48 | 25* | 24.00 | 0 | – | – | – | 0 | 0 | |
| 7 | Ray Illingworth ‡ | 1971 | 1973 | 3 | 5 | 4 | 2.50 | 130 | 4 | 3/50 | 21.00 | 1 | 0 | |
| 8 | Alan Knott ‡† | 1971 | 1977 | 20 | 200 | 50 | 20.00 | 0 | – | – | – | 15 | 1 | |
| 9 | Peter Lever | 1971 | 1975 | 10 | 17 | 8* | 17.00 | 440 | 11 | 4/35 | 23.72 | 2 | 0 | |
| 10 | Ken Shuttleworth | 1971 | 1971 | 1 | 7 | 7 | 7.00 | 56 | 1 | 1/29 | 29.00 | 1 | 0 | |
| 11 | John Snow | 1971 | 1975 | 9 | 9 | 5* | 4.50 | 538 | 14 | 4/11 | 16.57 | 1 | 0 | |
| 12 | Dennis Amiss | 1972 | 1977 | 18 | 859 | 137 | 47.72 | 0 | – | – | – | 2 | 0 | |
| 13 | Geoff Arnold | 1972 | 1975 | 14 | 48 | 18* | 16.00 | 714 | 19 | 4/27 | 17.84 | 2 | 0 | |
| 14 | Brian Close ‡ | 1972 | 1972 | 3 | 49 | 43 | 16.33 | 18 | 0 | – | – | 1 | 0 | |
| 15 | Tony Greig ‡ | 1972 | 1977 | 22 | 269 | 48 | 16.81 | 916 | 19 | 4/45 | 32.57 | 7 | 0 | |
| 16 | Bob Woolmer | 1972 | 1976 | 6 | 21 | 9 | 5.25 | 321 | 9 | 3/33 | 28.88 | 3 | 0 | |
| 17 | Barry Wood | 1972 | 1982 | 13 | 314 | 78* | 31.40 | 420 | 9 | 2/14 | 24.88 | 6 | 0 | |
| 18 | Frank Hayes | 1973 | 1975 | 6 | 128 | 52 | 25.60 | 0 | – | – | – | 0 | 0 | |
| 19 | Graham Roope | 1973 | 1978 | 8 | 173 | 44 | 21.62 | 0 | – | – | – | 2 | 0 | |
| 20 | Derek Underwood | 1973 | 1982 | 26 | 53 | 17 | 5.88 | 1,278 | 32 | 4/44 | 22.93 | 6 | 0 | |
| 21 | Mike Denness ‡ | 1973 | 1975 | 12 | 264 | 66 | 29.33 | 0 | – | – | – | 1 | 0 | |
| 22 | Mike Hendrick | 1973 | 1981 | 22 | 6 | 2* | 1.20 | 1,248 | 35 | 5/31 | 19.45 | 5 | 0 | |
| 23 | Chris Old | 1973 | 1981 | 32 | 338 | 51* | 18.77 | 1,755 | 45 | 4/8 | 22.20 | 8 | 0 | |
| 24 | Mike Smith | 1973 | 1975 | 5 | 70 | 31 | 14.00 | 0 | – | – | – | 1 | 0 | |
| 25 | Bob Taylor † | 1973 | 1984 | 27 | 130 | 26* | 13.00 | 0 | – | – | – | 26 | 6 | |
| 26 | Bob Willis ‡ | 1973 | 1984 | 64 | 83 | 24 | 10.37 | 3,595 | 80 | 4/11 | 24.60 | 22 | 0 | |
| 27 | John Jameson | 1973 | 1975 | 3 | 60 | 28 | 20.00 | 12 | 0 | – | – | 0 | 0 | |
| 28 | David Lloyd | 1973 | 1980 | 8 | 285 | 116* | 40.71 | 12 | 1 | 1/3 | 3.00 | 3 | 0 | |
| 29 | Robin Jackman | 1974 | 1983 | 15 | 54 | 14 | 6.75 | 873 | 19 | 3/41 | 31.47 | 4 | 0 | |
| 30 | Brian Luckhurst | 1975 | 1975 | 3 | 15 | 14 | 5.00 | 0 | – | – | – | 0 | 0 | |
| 31 | Fred Titmus | 1975 | 1975 | 2 | 11 | 11 | 11.00 | 56 | 3 | 3/53 | 17.66 | 1 | 0 | |
| 32 | Graham Barlow | 1976 | 1977 | 6 | 149 | 80* | 29.80 | 0 | – | – | – | 4 | 0 | |
| 33 | Ian Botham ‡ | 1976 | 1992 | 116 | 2,113 | 79 | 23.21 | 6,271 | 145 | 4/31 | 28.54 | 36 | 0 | |
| 34 | Graham Gooch ‡ | 1976 | 1995 | 125 | 4,290 | 142 | 36.98 | 2,066 | 36 | 3/19 | 42.11 | 45 | 0 | |
| 35 | John Lever | 1976 | 1982 | 22 | 56 | 27* | 8.00 | 1,152 | 24 | 4/29 | 29.70 | 6 | 0 | |
| 36 | David Steele | 1976 | 1976 | 1 | 8 | 8 | 8.00 | 6 | 0 | – | – | 0 | 0 | |
| 37 | Derek Randall | 1976 | 1985 | 49 | 1,067 | 88 | 26.67 | 2 | 1 | 1/2 | 2.00 | 25 | 0 | |
| 38 | Mike Brearley ‡ | 1977 | 1980 | 25 | 510 | 78 | 24.28 | 0 | – | – | – | 12 | 0 | |
| 39 | Peter Willey | 1977 | 1986 | 26 | 538 | 64 | 23.39 | 1,031 | 13 | 3/33 | 50.69 | 4 | 0 | |
| 40 | Geoff Miller | 1977 | 1984 | 25 | 136 | 46 | 8.50 | 1,268 | 25 | 3/27 | 32.52 | 4 | 0 | |
| 41 | Paul Downton † | 1977 | 1988 | 28 | 242 | 44* | 16.13 | 0 | – | – | – | 26 | 3 | |
| 42 | Phil Edmonds | 1977 | 1987 | 29 | 116 | 20 | 10.54 | 1,534 | 26 | 3/39 | 37.11 | 6 | 0 | |
| 43 | Mike Gatting ‡ | 1977 | 1993 | 92 | 2,095 | 115* | 29.50 | 392 | 10 | 3/32 | 33.60 | 22 | 0 | |
| 44 | Brian Rose | 1977 | 1977 | 2 | 99 | 54 | 49.50 | 0 | – | – | – | 1 | 0 | |
| 45 | Geoff Cope | 1977 | 1978 | 2 | 1 | 1* | – | 112 | 2 | 1/16 | 17.50 | 0 | 0 | |
| 46 | David Gower ‡ | 1978 | 1991 | 114 | 3,170 | 158 | 30.77 | 5 | 0 | – | – | 44 | 0 | |
| 47 | Clive Radley | 1978 | 1978 | 4 | 250 | 117* | 83.33 | 0 | – | – | – | 0 | 0 | |
| 48 | Roger Tolchard † | 1979 | 1979 | 1 | – | – | – | 0 | – | – | – | 1 | 0 | |
| 49 | David Bairstow † | 1979 | 1984 | 21 | 206 | 23* | 14.71 | 0 | – | – | – | 17 | 4 | |
| 50 | Wayne Larkins | 1979 | 1991 | 25 | 591 | 124 | 24.62 | 15 | 0 | – | – | 8 | 0 | |
| 51 | Graham Dilley | 1979 | 1988 | 36 | 114 | 31* | 11.40 | 2,403 | 48 | 4/23 | 26.89 | 4 | 0 | |
| 52 | John Emburey ‡ | 1980 | 1993 | 61 | 501 | 34 | 14.31 | 3,425 | 76 | 4/37 | 30.86 | 19 | 0 | |
| 53 | Graham Stevenson | 1980 | 1981 | 4 | 43 | 28* | 43.00 | 192 | 7 | 4/33 | 17.85 | 2 | 0 | |
| 54 | Chris Tavaré | 1980 | 1984 | 29 | 720 | 83* | 27.69 | 12 | 0 | – | – | 7 | 0 | |
| 55 | Vic Marks | 1980 | 1988 | 34 | 285 | 44 | 13.57 | 1,838 | 44 | 5/20 | 25.79 | 8 | 0 | |
| 56 | Bill Athey | 1980 | 1988 | 31 | 848 | 142* | 31.40 | 6 | 0 | – | – | 16 | 0 | |
| 57 | Alan Butcher | 1980 | 1980 | 1 | 14 | 14 | 14.00 | 0 | – | – | – | 0 | 0 | |
| 58 | Roland Butcher | 1980 | 1981 | 3 | 58 | 52 | 19.33 | 0 | – | – | – | 0 | 0 | |
| 59 | Geoff Humpage † | 1981 | 1981 | 3 | 11 | 6 | 5.50 | 0 | – | – | – | 2 | 0 | |
| 60 | Jim Love | 1981 | 1981 | 3 | 61 | 43 | 20.33 | 0 | – | – | – | 1 | 0 | |
| 61 | Geoff Cook | 1981 | 1983 | 6 | 106 | 32 | 17.66 | 0 | – | – | – | 2 | 0 | |
| 62 | Jack Richards † | 1981 | 1988 | 22 | 154 | 50 | 11.84 | 0 | – | – | – | 16 | 1 | |
| 63 | Paul Allott | 1982 | 1985 | 13 | 15 | 8 | 3.00 | 819 | 15 | 3/41 | 36.80 | 2 | 0 | |
| 64 | Allan Lamb ‡ | 1982 | 1992 | 122 | 4,010 | 118 | 39.31 | 6 | 0 | – | – | 31 | 0 | |
| 65 | Eddie Hemmings | 1982 | 1991 | 33 | 30 | 8* | 5.00 | 1,752 | 37 | 4/52 | 34.97 | 5 | 0 | |
| 66 | Derek Pringle | 1982 | 1993 | 44 | 425 | 49* | 23.61 | 2,379 | 44 | 4/42 | 38.11 | 11 | 0 | |
| 67 | Norman Cowans | 1982 | 1985 | 23 | 13 | 4* | 2.60 | 1,282 | 23 | 3/44 | 39.69 | 5 | 0 | |
| 68 | Trevor Jesty | 1983 | 1983 | 10 | 127 | 52* | 21.16 | 108 | 1 | 1/27 | 93.00 | 5 | 0 | |
| 69 | Ian Gould † | 1983 | 1983 | 18 | 155 | 42 | 12.91 | 0 | – | – | – | 15 | 3 | |
| 70 | Graeme Fowler † | 1983 | 1986 | 26 | 744 | 81* | 31.00 | 0 | – | – | – | 4 | 2 | |
| 71 | Neil Foster | 1984 | 1989 | 48 | 150 | 24 | 11.53 | 2,627 | 59 | 3/20 | 31.11 | 12 | 0 | |
| 72 | Chris Smith | 1984 | 1984 | 4 | 109 | 70 | 27.25 | 36 | 2 | 2/8 | 14.00 | 0 | 0 | |
| 73 | Nick Cook | 1984 | 1984 | 3 | – | – | – | 144 | 5 | 2/18 | 19.00 | 2 | 0 | |
| 74 | Andy Lloyd | 1984 | 1984 | 3 | 101 | 49 | 33.66 | 0 | – | – | – | 0 | 0 | |
| 75 | Richard Ellison | 1984 | 1986 | 14 | 86 | 24 | 10.75 | 696 | 12 | 3/42 | 42.50 | 2 | 0 | |
| 76 | Tim Robinson | 1984 | 1988 | 26 | 597 | 83 | 22.96 | 0 | – | – | – | 6 | 0 | |
| 77 | Jonathan Agnew | 1985 | 1985 | 3 | 2 | 2* | – | 126 | 3 | 3/38 | 40.00 | 1 | 0 | |
| 78 | Chris Cowdrey | 1985 | 1985 | 3 | 51 | 46* | 25.50 | 52 | 2 | 1/3 | 27.50 | 0 | 0 | |
| 79 | Martyn Moxon | 1985 | 1988 | 8 | 174 | 70 | 21.75 | 0 | – | – | – | 5 | 0 | |
| 80 | Bruce French † | 1985 | 1988 | 13 | 34 | 9* | 6.80 | 0 | – | – | – | 13 | 3 | |
| 81 | Norman Gifford ‡ | 1985 | 1985 | 2 | 0 | 0 | 0.00 | 120 | 4 | 4/23 | 12.50 | 1 | 0 | |
| 82 | Colin Wells | 1985 | 1985 | 2 | 22 | 17 | 11.00 | 0 | – | – | – | 0 | 0 | |
| 83 | Rob Bailey | 1985 | 1990 | 4 | 137 | 43* | 68.50 | 36 | 0 | – | – | 1 | 0 | |
| 84 | Pat Pocock | 1985 | 1985 | 1 | 4 | 4 | 4.00 | 60 | 0 | – | – | 0 | 0 | |
| 85 | Les Taylor | 1986 | 1986 | 2 | 1 | 1* | – | 84 | 0 | – | – | 0 | 0 | |
| 86 | Greg Thomas | 1986 | 1987 | 3 | 1 | 1* | 1.00 | 156 | 3 | 2/59 | 48.00 | 0 | 0 | |
| 87 | Wilf Slack | 1986 | 1986 | 2 | 43 | 34 | 21.50 | 0 | – | – | – | 0 | 0 | |
| 88 | David Smith | 1986 | 1990 | 2 | 15 | 10* | 15.00 | 0 | – | – | – | 0 | 0 | |
| 89 | Mark Benson | 1986 | 1986 | 1 | 24 | 24 | 24.00 | 0 | – | – | – | 0 | 0 | |
| 90 | Chris Broad | 1987 | 1988 | 34 | 1,361 | 106 | 40.02 | 6 | 0 | – | – | 10 | 0 | |
| 91 | Phillip DeFreitas | 1987 | 1997 | 103 | 690 | 67 | 16.04 | 5,712 | 115 | 4/35 | 32.82 | 26 | 0 | |
| 92 | Gladstone Small | 1987 | 1992 | 53 | 98 | 18* | 6.53 | 2,793 | 58 | 4/31 | 33.48 | 7 | 0 | |
| 93 | David Capel | 1987 | 1990 | 23 | 327 | 50* | 19.23 | 1,038 | 17 | 3/38 | 47.35 | 6 | 0 | |
| 94 | Neil Fairbrother | 1987 | 1999 | 75 | 2,092 | 113 | 39.47 | 6 | 0 | – | – | 33 | 0 | |
| 95 | James Whitaker | 1987 | 1987 | 2 | 48 | 44* | 48.00 | 0 | – | – | – | 1 | 0 | |
| 96 | Jack Russell † | 1987 | 1998 | 40 | 423 | 50 | 17.62 | 0 | – | – | – | 41 | 6 | |
| 97 | Paul Jarvis | 1988 | 1993 | 16 | 31 | 16* | 5.16 | 879 | 24 | 5/35 | 28.00 | 1 | 0 | |
| 98 | Neal Radford | 1988 | 1988 | 6 | 0 | 0* | 0.00 | 348 | 2 | 1/32 | 115.00 | 2 | 0 | |
| 99 | Monte Lynch | 1988 | 1988 | 3 | 8 | 6 | 2.66 | 0 | – | – | – | 1 | 0 | |
| 100 | Kim Barnett | 1988 | 1988 | 1 | 84 | 84 | 84.00 | 0 | – | – | – | 0 | 0 | |
| 101 | Robin Smith | 1988 | 1996 | 71 | 2,419 | 167* | 39.01 | 0 | – | – | – | 26 | 0 | |
| 102 | Steve Rhodes † | 1989 | 1995 | 9 | 107 | 56 | 17.83 | 0 | – | – | – | 9 | 2 | |
| 103 | Angus Fraser | 1989 | 1999 | 42 | 141 | 38* | 12.81 | 2,392 | 47 | 4/22 | 30.04 | 5 | 0 | |
| 104 | Alec Stewart ‡† | 1989 | 2003 | 170 | 4,677 | 116 | 31.60 | 0 | – | – | – | 159 | 15 | |
| 105 | Nasser Hussain ‡ | 1989 | 2003 | 88 | 2,332 | 115 | 30.28 | 0 | – | – | – | 40 | 0 | |
| 106 | Chris Lewis | 1990 | 1998 | 53 | 374 | 33 | 14.38 | 2,625 | 66 | 4/30 | 29.42 | 20 | 0 | |
| 107 | Devon Malcolm | 1990 | 1994 | 10 | 9 | 4 | 3.00 | 526 | 16 | 3/40 | 25.25 | 1 | 0 | |
| 108 | Michael Atherton ‡ | 1990 | 1998 | 54 | 1,791 | 127 | 35.11 | 0 | – | – | – | 15 | 0 | |
| 109 | John Morris | 1990 | 1991 | 8 | 167 | 63* | 23.85 | 0 | – | – | – | 2 | 0 | |
| 110 | Martin Bicknell | 1990 | 1991 | 7 | 96 | 31* | 24.00 | 413 | 13 | 3/55 | 26.69 | 2 | 0 | |
| 111 | Phil Tufnell | 1990 | 1997 | 20 | 15 | 5* | 15.00 | 1,020 | 19 | 4/22 | 36.78 | 4 | 0 | |
| 112 | Graeme Hick | 1991 | 2001 | 120 | 3,846 | 126* | 37.33 | 1,236 | 30 | 5/33 | 34.20 | 64 | 0 | |
| 113 | Richard Illingworth | 1991 | 1996 | 25 | 68 | 14 | 11.33 | 1,501 | 30 | 3/33 | 35.30 | 8 | 0 | |
| 114 | Mark Ramprakash | 1991 | 2001 | 18 | 376 | 51 | 28.65 | 132 | 4 | 3/28 | 27.00 | 8 | 0 | |
| 115 | David Lawrence | 1991 | 1991 | 1 | – | – | – | 66 | 4 | 4/67 | 16.75 | 0 | 0 | |
| 116 | Dermot Reeve | 1991 | 1996 | 29 | 291 | 35 | 24.25 | 1,147 | 20 | 3/20 | 41.00 | 12 | 0 | |
| 117 | Richard Blakey † | 1992 | 1993 | 3 | 25 | 25 | 12.50 | 0 | – | – | – | 2 | 1 | |
| 118 | Dominic Cork | 1992 | 2002 | 32 | 180 | 31* | 10.00 | 1,772 | 41 | 3/27 | 33.36 | 6 | 0 | |
| 119 | Ian Salisbury | 1993 | 1994 | 4 | 7 | 5 | 7.00 | 186 | 5 | 3/41 | 35.40 | 1 | 0 | |
| 120 | Paul Taylor | 1993 | 1993 | 1 | 1 | 1 | 1.00 | 18 | 0 | – | – | 0 | 0 | |
| 121 | Andy Caddick | 1993 | 2003 | 54 | 249 | 36 | 12.45 | 2,937 | 69 | 4/19 | 28.47 | 9 | 0 | |
| 122 | Graham Thorpe ‡ | 1993 | 2002 | 82 | 2,380 | 89 | 37.18 | 120 | 2 | 2/15 | 48.50 | 42 | 0 | |
| 123 | Alan Igglesden | 1994 | 1994 | 4 | 20 | 18 | 10.00 | 168 | 2 | 2/12 | 61.00 | 1 | 0 | |
| 124 | Matthew Maynard | 1994 | 2000 | 14 | 156 | 41 | 14.18 | 0 | – | – | – | 4 | 0 | |
| 125 | Steve Watkin | 1994 | 1994 | 4 | 4 | 4 | 2.00 | 221 | 7 | 4/49 | 27.57 | 0 | 0 | |
| 126 | Darren Gough | 1994 | 2006 | 158 | 609 | 46* | 12.42 | 8,422 | 234 | 5/44 | 26.29 | 24 | 0 | (Note: Darren Gough has also played One Day International cricket for ICC World ODI XI. Only his record for England is given above.) |
| 127 | Shaun Udal | 1994 | 2005 | 11 | 35 | 11* | 11.66 | 612 | 9 | 2/37 | 44.44 | 1 | 0 | |
| 128 | Joey Benjamin | 1994 | 1995 | 2 | 0 | 0 | 0.00 | 72 | 1 | 1/22 | 47.00 | 0 | 0 | |
| 129 | Craig White | 1994 | 2003 | 51 | 568 | 57* | 15.77 | 2,364 | 65 | 5/21 | 26.55 | 12 | 0 | |
| 130 | John Crawley † | 1994 | 1999 | 13 | 235 | 73 | 21.36 | 0 | – | – | – | 1 | 1 | |
| 131 | Peter Martin | 1995 | 1998 | 20 | 38 | 6 | 6.33 | 1,048 | 27 | 4/44 | 29.85 | 1 | 0 | |
| 132 | Alan Wells | 1995 | 1995 | 1 | 15 | 15 | 15.00 | 0 | – | – | – | 0 | 0 | |
| 133 | Neil Smith | 1996 | 1996 | 7 | 100 | 31 | 20.00 | 261 | 6 | 3/29 | 31.66 | 1 | 0 | |
| 134 | Mike Watkinson | 1996 | 1996 | 1 | – | – | – | 54 | 0 | – | – | 0 | 0 | |
| 135 | Ali Brown | 1996 | 2001 | 16 | 354 | 118 | 22.12 | 6 | 0 | – | – | 6 | 0 | |
| 136 | Mark Ealham | 1996 | 2001 | 64 | 716 | 45 | 17.46 | 3,227 | 67 | 5/15 | 32.79 | 9 | 0 | |
| 137 | Ronnie Irani | 1996 | 2003 | 31 | 360 | 53 | 14.40 | 1,283 | 24 | 5/26 | 41.20 | 6 | 0 | |
| 138 | Robert Croft | 1996 | 2001 | 50 | 345 | 32 | 14.37 | 2,466 | 45 | 3/51 | 38.73 | 11 | 0 | |
| 139 | Dean Headley | 1996 | 1999 | 13 | 22 | 10* | 11.00 | 594 | 11 | 2/38 | 47.27 | 3 | 0 | |
| 140 | Nick Knight | 1996 | 2003 | 100 | 3,637 | 125* | 40.41 | 0 | – | – | – | 44 | 0 | |
| 141 | Graham Lloyd | 1996 | 1998 | 6 | 39 | 22 | 9.75 | 0 | – | – | – | 2 | 0 | |
| 142 | Alan Mullally | 1996 | 2001 | 50 | 86 | 20 | 5.73 | 2,699 | 63 | 4/18 | 27.42 | 8 | 0 | |
| 143 | Adam Hollioake ‡ | 1996 | 1999 | 35 | 606 | 83* | 25.25 | 1,208 | 32 | 4/23 | 31.84 | 13 | 0 | |
| 144 | Chris Silverwood | 1996 | 2001 | 7 | 17 | 12 | 4.25 | 306 | 6 | 3/43 | 40.66 | 0 | 0 | |
| 145 | Ashley Giles | 1997 | 2005 | 62 | 385 | 41 | 17.50 | 2,856 | 55 | 5/57 | 37.61 | 22 | 0 | |
| 146 | Ben Hollioake | 1997 | 2002 | 20 | 309 | 63 | 20.60 | 642 | 8 | 2/37 | 66.50 | 6 | 0 | |
| 147 | Dougie Brown | 1997 | 1998 | 9 | 99 | 21 | 24.75 | 324 | 7 | 2/28 | 43.57 | 1 | 0 | (Note: Dougie Brown has also played One Day International cricket for Scotland. Only his record for England is given above.) |
| 148 | Matthew Fleming | 1997 | 1998 | 11 | 139 | 33 | 15.44 | 523 | 17 | 4/45 | 25.52 | 1 | 0 | |
| 149 | Chris Adams | 1998 | 2000 | 5 | 71 | 42 | 17.75 | 0 | – | – | – | 3 | 0 | |
| 150 | Darren Maddy | 1998 | 2000 | 8 | 113 | 53 | 18.83 | 0 | – | – | – | 1 | 0 | |
| 151 | Ian Austin | 1998 | 1999 | 9 | 34 | 11* | 6.80 | 475 | 6 | 2/25 | 60.00 | 0 | 0 | |
| 152 | Mark Alleyne | 1999 | 2000 | 10 | 151 | 53 | 21.57 | 366 | 10 | 3/27 | 28.00 | 3 | 0 | |
| 153 | Vince Wells | 1999 | 1999 | 9 | 141 | 39 | 20.14 | 220 | 8 | 3/30 | 23.62 | 7 | 0 | |
| 154 | Andrew Flintoff ‡ | 1999 | 2009 | 138 | 3,293 | 123 | 31.97 | 5,496 | 168 | 5/19 | 23.61 | 46 | 0 | (Note: Andrew Flintoff has also played One Day International cricket for ICC World ODI XI. Only his record for England is given above.) |
| 155 | Chris Read † | 2000 | 2006 | 36 | 300 | 30* | 17.64 | 0 | – | – | – | 41 | 2 | |
| 156 | Vikram Solanki | 2000 | 2006 | 51 | 1,097 | 106 | 26.75 | 111 | 1 | 1/17 | 105.00 | 3 | 0 | |
| 157 | Graeme Swann | 2000 | 2013 | 79 | 500 | 34 | 13.88 | 3,809 | 104 | 5/28 | 27.76 | 29 | 0 | |
| 158 | Marcus Trescothick ‡† | 2000 | 2006 | 123 | 4,335 | 137 | 37.37 | 232 | 4 | 2/7 | 54.75 | 49 | 0 | |
| 159 | Paul Franks | 2000 | 2000 | 1 | 4 | 4 | 4.00 | 54 | 0 | – | – | 1 | 0 | |
| 160 | Paul Grayson | 2000 | 2001 | 2 | 6 | 6 | 3.00 | 90 | 3 | 3/40 | 20.00 | 1 | 0 | |
| 161 | Michael Vaughan ‡ | 2001 | 2007 | 86 | 1,982 | 90* | 27.15 | 796 | 16 | 4/22 | 40.56 | 25 | 0 | |
| 162 | Paul Collingwood ‡ | 2001 | 2011 | 197 | 5,092 | 120* | 35.36 | 5,186 | 111 | 6/31 | 38.68 | 108 | 0 | |
| 163 | Owais Shah | 2001 | 2009 | 71 | 1,834 | 107* | 30.56 | 193 | 7 | 3/15 | 26.28 | 21 | 0 | |
| 164 | James Foster † | 2001 | 2002 | 11 | 41 | 13 | 13.66 | 0 | – | – | – | 13 | 7 | |
| 165 | Matthew Hoggard | 2001 | 2006 | 26 | 17 | 7 | 4.25 | 1,306 | 32 | 5/49 | 36.00 | 5 | 0 | |
| 166 | James Kirtley | 2001 | 2004 | 11 | 2 | 1 | 1.00 | 549 | 9 | 2/33 | 53.44 | 5 | 0 | |
| 167 | Jeremy Snape | 2001 | 2002 | 10 | 118 | 38 | 29.50 | 529 | 13 | 3/43 | 31.00 | 5 | 0 | |
| 168 | Ryan Sidebottom | 2001 | 2010 | 25 | 133 | 24 | 13.30 | 1,277 | 29 | 3/19 | 35.82 | 6 | 0 | |
| 169 | Alex Tudor | 2002 | 2002 | 3 | 9 | 6 | 9.00 | 127 | 4 | 2/30 | 34.00 | 1 | 0 | |
| 170 | Ian Blackwell | 2002 | 2006 | 34 | 403 | 82 | 14.92 | 1,230 | 24 | 3/26 | 36.54 | 8 | 0 | |
| 171 | Gareth Batty | 2002 | 2009 | 10 | 30 | 17 | 5.00 | 440 | 5 | 2/40 | 73.20 | 4 | 0 | |
| 172 | James Anderson | 2002 | 2015 | 194 | 273 | 28 | 7.58 | 9,584 | 269 | 5/23 | 29.22 | 53 | 0 | |
| 173 | Steve Harmison | 2002 | 2009 | 58 | 91 | 18* | 8.27 | 2,899 | 76 | 5/33 | 32.64 | 10 | 0 | |
| 174 | Rikki Clarke | 2003 | 2006 | 20 | 144 | 39 | 11.07 | 469 | 11 | 2/28 | 37.72 | 11 | 0 | |
| 175 | Anthony McGrath | 2003 | 2004 | 14 | 166 | 52 | 16.60 | 228 | 4 | 1/13 | 43.75 | 4 | 0 | |
| 176 | Jim Troughton | 2003 | 2003 | 6 | 36 | 20 | 9.00 | 0 | – | – | – | 1 | 0 | |
| 177 | Richard Johnson | 2003 | 2003 | 10 | 16 | 10 | 5.33 | 402 | 11 | 3/22 | 21.72 | 0 | 0 | |
| 178 | Robert Key | 2003 | 2004 | 5 | 54 | 19 | 10.80 | 0 | – | – | – | 0 | 0 | |
| 179 | Kabir Ali | 2003 | 2006 | 14 | 93 | 39* | 15.50 | 673 | 20 | 4/45 | 34.10 | 1 | 0 | |
| 180 | Andrew Strauss ‡ | 2003 | 2011 | 127 | 4,205 | 158 | 35.63 | 6 | 0 | – | – | 57 | 0 | |
| 181 | Geraint Jones † | 2004 | 2006 | 49 | 815 | 80 | 24.69 | 0 | – | – | – | 68 | 4 | (Note: Geraint Jones has also played One Day International cricket for Papua New Guinea. Only his record for England is given above.) |
| 182 | Sajid Mahmood | 2004 | 2009 | 26 | 85 | 22* | 7.72 | 1,197 | 30 | 4/50 | 38.96 | 1 | 0 | |
| 183 | Alex Wharf | 2004 | 2005 | 13 | 19 | 9 | 9.50 | 584 | 18 | 4/24 | 23.77 | 1 | 0 | |
| 184 | Ian Bell | 2004 | 2015 | 161 | 5,416 | 141 | 37.87 | 88 | 6 | 3/9 | 14.66 | 54 | 0 | |
| 185 | Kevin Pietersen ‡ | 2004 | 2013 | 134 | 4,422 | 130 | 41.32 | 400 | 7 | 2/22 | 52.85 | 39 | 0 | (Note: Kevin Pietersen has also played One Day International cricket for ICC World ODI XI. Only his record for England is given above.) |
| 186 | Simon Jones | 2004 | 2005 | 8 | 1 | 1 | 1.00 | 348 | 7 | 2/43 | 39.28 | 0 | 0 | |
| 187 | Matt Prior † | 2004 | 2011 | 68 | 1,282 | 87 | 24.18 | 0 | – | – | – | 71 | 8 | |
| 188 | Jon Lewis | 2005 | 2007 | 13 | 50 | 17 | 8.33 | 716 | 18 | 4/36 | 27.77 | 0 | 0 | |
| 189 | Chris Tremlett | 2005 | 2011 | 15 | 50 | 19* | 7.14 | 784 | 15 | 4/32 | 47.00 | 4 | 0 | |
| 190 | Liam Plunkett | 2005 | 2019 | 89 | 646 | 56 | 20.83 | 4,137 | 135 | 5/52 | 29.70 | 26 | 0 | |
| 191 | Glen Chapple | 2006 | 2006 | 1 | 14 | 14 | 14.00 | 24 | 0 | – | – | 0 | 0 | |
| 192 | Jamie Dalrymple | 2006 | 2007 | 27 | 487 | 67 | 19.48 | 840 | 14 | 2/5 | 47.57 | 12 | 0 | |
| 193 | Ed Joyce | 2006 | 2007 | 17 | 471 | 107 | 27.70 | 0 | – | – | – | 6 | 0 | (Note: Ed Joyce has also played One Day International cricket for Ireland. Only his record for England is given above.) |
| 194 | Tim Bresnan | 2006 | 2015 | 85 | 871 | 80 | 19.79 | 4,221 | 109 | 5/48 | 34.98 | 20 | 0 | |
| 195 | Alex Loudon | 2006 | 2006 | 1 | 0 | 0 | 0.00 | 36 | 0 | – | – | 0 | 0 | |
| 196 | Alastair Cook ‡ | 2006 | 2014 | 92 | 3,204 | 137 | 36.40 | 0 | – | – | – | 36 | 0 | |
| 197 | Stuart Broad ‡ | 2006 | 2016 | 121 | 529 | 45* | 12.30 | 6,109 | 178 | 5/23 | 30.13 | 27 | 0 | |
| 198 | Michael Yardy | 2006 | 2011 | 28 | 326 | 60* | 20.37 | 1,332 | 21 | 3/24 | 51.19 | 10 | 0 | |
| 199 | Paul Nixon † | 2007 | 2007 | 19 | 297 | 49 | 21.21 | 0 | – | – | – | 20 | 3 | |
| 200 | Monty Panesar | 2007 | 2007 | 26 | 26 | 13 | 5.20 | 1,308 | 24 | 3/25 | 40.83 | 3 | 0 | |
| 201 | Mal Loye | 2007 | 2007 | 7 | 142 | 45 | 20.28 | 0 | – | – | – | 0 | 0 | |
| 202 | Ravi Bopara | 2007 | 2015 | 120 | 2,695 | 101* | 30.62 | 1,860 | 40 | 4/38 | 38.07 | 35 | 0 | |
| 203 | Dimitri Mascarenhas | 2007 | 2009 | 20 | 245 | 52 | 22.27 | 822 | 13 | 3/23 | 48.76 | 4 | 0 | |
| 204 | Luke Wright | 2007 | 2014 | 50 | 707 | 52 | 20.20 | 1,038 | 15 | 2/34 | 58.93 | 18 | 0 | |
| 205 | Phil Mustard † | 2007 | 2008 | 10 | 233 | 83 | 23.30 | 0 | – | – | – | 9 | 2 | |
| 206 | Tim Ambrose † | 2008 | 2008 | 5 | 10 | 6 | 2.50 | 0 | – | – | – | 3 | 0 | |
| 207 | Samit Patel | 2008 | 2013 | 36 | 482 | 70* | 32.13 | 1,187 | 24 | 5/41 | 45.45 | 7 | 0 | |
| 208 | Eoin Morgan ‡† | 2009 | 2022 | 225 | 6,957 | 148 | 39.75 | 0 | – | – | – | 78 | 0 | (Note: Eoin Morgan has also played One Day International cricket for Ireland. Only his record for England is given above.) |
| 209 | Joe Denly | 2009 | 2020 | 16 | 446 | 87 | 34.30 | 102 | 1 | 1/24 | 101.00 | 7 | 0 | |
| 210 | Adil Rashid | 2009 | 2026 | 165 | 972 | 69 | 16.20 | 8,237 | 244 | 5/27 | 31.79 | 54 | 0 | |
| 211 | Jonathan Trott | 2009 | 2013 | 68 | 2,819 | 137 | 51.25 | 183 | 2 | 2/31 | 83.00 | 14 | 0 | |
| 212 | Graham Onions | 2009 | 2009 | 4 | 1 | 1 | 1.00 | 204 | 4 | 2/58 | 46.25 | 1 | 0 | |
| 213 | Steven Davies † | 2009 | 2011 | 8 | 244 | 87 | 30.50 | 0 | – | – | – | 8 | 0 | |
| 214 | Craig Kieswetter † | 2010 | 2013 | 46 | 1,054 | 107 | 30.11 | 0 | – | – | – | 53 | 12 | |
| 215 | James Tredwell | 2010 | 2015 | 45 | 163 | 30 | 11.64 | 2,104 | 60 | 4/41 | 27.76 | 14 | 0 | |
| 216 | Ajmal Shahzad | 2010 | 2011 | 11 | 39 | 9 | 6.50 | 588 | 17 | 3/41 | 28.82 | 4 | 0 | |
| 217 | Chris Woakes | 2011 | 2023 | 122 | 1,524 | 95* | 23.81 | 5,734 | 172 | 6/45 | 30.19 | 50 | 0 | |
| 218 | Steven Finn | 2011 | 2017 | 69 | 136 | 35 | 8.00 | 3,550 | 102 | 5/33 | 29.37 | 15 | 0 | |
| 219 | Jade Dernbach | 2011 | 2014 | 24 | 19 | 5 | 2.71 | 1,234 | 31 | 4/45 | 42.19 | 5 | 0 | |
| 220 | Scott Borthwick | 2011 | 2011 | 2 | 18 | 15 | 9.00 | 54 | 0 | – | – | 0 | 0 | |
| 221 | Ben Stokes ‡ | 2011 | 2023 | 114 | 3,463 | 182 | 41.22 | 3,110 | 74 | 5/61 | 42.39 | 54 | 0 | |
| 222 | James Taylor ‡ | 2011 | 2015 | 27 | 887 | 101 | 42.23 | 0 | – | – | – | 7 | 0 | |
| 223 | Jonny Bairstow † | 2011 | 2023 | 107 | 3,868 | 141* | 42.97 | 0 | – | – | – | 55 | 3 | |
| 224 | Stuart Meaker | 2012 | 2012 | 2 | 2 | 1 | 1.00 | 114 | 2 | 1/45 | 55.00 | 0 | 0 | |
| 225 | Danny Briggs | 2012 | 2012 | 1 | – | – | – | 60 | 2 | 2/39 | 19.50 | 0 | 0 | |
| 226 | Jos Buttler ‡† | 2012 | 2026 | 204 | 5,678 | 162* | 39.15 | 0 | – | – | – | 242 | 39 | |
| 227 | Joe Root | 2013 | 2026 | 199 | 8,010 | 166* | 50.37 | 1,818 | 32 | 3/52 | 56.46 | 95 | 0 | |
| 228 | Gary Ballance | 2013 | 2015 | 16 | 297 | 79 | 21.21 | 0 | – | – | – | 8 | 0 | (Note: Gary Ballance has also played One Day International cricket for Zimbabwe. Only his record for England is given above.) |
| 229 | Michael Carberry | 2013 | 2014 | 6 | 114 | 63 | 19.00 | 6 | 0 | – | – | 2 | 0 | |
| 230 | Boyd Rankin | 2013 | 2014 | 7 | 5 | 4 | 5.00 | 319 | 10 | 4/46 | 24.10 | 0 | 0 | (Note: Boyd Rankin has also played One Day International cricket for Ireland. Only his record for England is given above.) |
| 231 | Chris Jordan | 2013 | 2022 | 35 | 184 | 38* | 12.26 | 1,660 | 46 | 5/29 | 36.08 | 19 | 0 | |
| 232 | Moeen Ali | 2014 | 2023 | 138 | 2,355 | 128 | 24.27 | 5,988 | 111 | 4/46 | 47.84 | 48 | 0 | |
| 233 | Michael Lumb | 2014 | 2014 | 3 | 165 | 106 | 55.00 | 0 | – | – | – | 1 | 0 | |
| 234 | Stephen Parry | 2014 | 2014 | 2 | – | – | – | 114 | 4 | 3/32 | 23.00 | 0 | 0 | |
| 235 | Harry Gurney | 2014 | 2014 | 10 | 15 | 6* | 7.50 | 455 | 11 | 4/55 | 39.27 | 1 | 0 | |
| 236 | Alex Hales | 2014 | 2019 | 70 | 2,419 | 171 | 37.79 | 0 | – | – | – | 27 | 0 | |
| 237 | Zafar Ansari | 2015 | 2015 | 1 | – | – | – | 0 | – | – | – | 0 | 0 | |
| 238 | Jason Roy | 2015 | 2023 | 116 | 4,271 | 180 | 39.91 | 0 | – | – | – | 46 | 0 | |
| 239 | James Vince | 2015 | 2023 | 25 | 616 | 102 | 28.00 | 42 | 1 | 1/18 | 38.00 | 10 | 0 | |
| 240 | David Willey | 2015 | 2023 | 73 | 663 | 51 | 24.55 | 3,227 | 100 | 5/30 | 29.70 | 27 | 0 | |
| 241 | Mark Wood | 2015 | 2025 | 70 | 168 | 43* | 12.92 | 3,506 | 80 | 4/33 | 40.82 | 14 | 0 | |
| 242 | Sam Billings † | 2015 | 2022 | 28 | 703 | 118 | 33.42 | 0 | – | – | – | 19 | 1 | |
| 243 | Reece Topley | 2015 | 2024 | 30 | 35 | 15* | 11.66 | 1,392 | 47 | 6/24 | 26.74 | 7 | 0 | |
| 244 | Liam Dawson | 2016 | 2026 | 14 | 138 | 68 | 15.33 | 684 | 19 | 4/49 | 31.00 | 4 | 0 | |
| 245 | Jake Ball | 2016 | 2018 | 18 | 38 | 28 | 9.50 | 947 | 21 | 5/51 | 46.66 | 5 | 0 | |
| 246 | Ben Duckett | 2016 | 2026 | 44 | 1,974 | 167 | 45.90 | 0 | – | – | – | 14 | 0 | |
| 247 | Toby Roland-Jones | 2017 | 2017 | 1 | 37 | 37* | – | 42 | 1 | 1/34 | 34.00 | 0 | 0 | |
| 248 | Tom Curran | 2017 | 2021 | 28 | 303 | 47* | 37.87 | 1,308 | 34 | 5/35 | 37.94 | 5 | 0 | |
| 249 | Craig Overton | 2018 | 2022 | 7 | 68 | 32 | 22.66 | 308 | 5 | 2/23 | 58.20 | 4 | 0 | |
| 250 | Sam Curran | 2018 | 2026 | 48 | 758 | 95* | 23.68 | 1,856 | 47 | 5/48 | 41.36 | 16 | 0 | |
| 251 | Olly Stone | 2018 | 2024 | 10 | 24 | 9* | 8.00 | 394 | 9 | 4/85 | 44.33 | 2 | 0 | |
| 252 | Jofra Archer | 2019 | 2026 | 42 | 221 | 38* | 17.00 | 2,189 | 71 | 6/40 | 26.42 | 10 | 0 | |
| 253 | Ben Foakes † | 2019 | 2019 | 1 | 61 | 61* | – | 0 | – | – | – | 2 | 1 | |
| 254 | Dawid Malan | 2019 | 2023 | 30 | 1,450 | 140 | 55.76 | 15 | 1 | 1/5 | 17.00 | 11 | 0 | |
| 255 | Tom Banton | 2020 | 2026 | 14 | 566 | 126 | 43.53 | 0 | – | – | – | 10 | 0 | |
| 256 | Matt Parkinson | 2020 | 2021 | 5 | 7 | 7* | – | 208 | 5 | 2/28 | 40.60 | 1 | 0 | |
| 257 | Saqib Mahmood | 2020 | 2026 | 18 | 31 | 12 | 10.33 | 895 | 27 | 4/42 | 28.88 | 3 | 0 | |
| 258 | Liam Livingstone ‡ | 2021 | 2025 | 39 | 932 | 124* | 31.06 | 968 | 25 | 3/16 | 39.28 | 15 | 0 | |
| 259 | Brydon Carse | 2021 | 2025 | 30 | 264 | 36 | 17.60 | 1,301 | 34 | 5/61 | 40.44 | 10 | 0 | |
| 260 | Zak Crawley ‡ | 2021 | 2026 | 9 | 205 | 58* | 25.62 | 0 | – | – | – | 8 | 0 | |
| 261 | Lewis Gregory | 2021 | 2021 | 3 | 117 | 77 | 58.50 | 114 | 4 | 3/44 | 24.25 | 0 | 0 | |
| 262 | Phil Salt † | 2021 | 2025 | 33 | 988 | 122 | 31.87 | 0 | – | – | – | 16 | 0 | |
| 263 | John Simpson † | 2021 | 2021 | 3 | 20 | 17 | 10.00 | 0 | – | – | – | 9 | 0 | |
| 264 | David Payne | 2022 | 2022 | 1 | – | – | – | 54 | 1 | 1/38 | 38.00 | 0 | 0 | |
| 265 | Matthew Potts | 2022 | 2025 | 11 | 45 | 15* | 45.00 | 402 | 12 | 4/38 | 33.33 | 4 | 0 | |
| 266 | Luke Wood | 2022 | 2025 | 3 | 15 | 10 | 15.00 | 108 | 1 | 1/54 | 113.00 | 0 | 0 | |
| 267 | Harry Brook ‡ | 2023 | 2026 | 48 | 1,782 | 202 | 40.50 | 0 | – | – | – | 24 | 0 | |
| 268 | Will Jacks | 2023 | 2026 | 33 | 930 | 94 | 35.76 | 751 | 18 | 5/22 | 41.77 | 17 | 0 | |
| 269 | Rehan Ahmed | 2023 | 2026 | 11 | 101 | 27 | 11.22 | 486 | 15 | 4/54 | 29.66 | 2 | 0 | |
| 270 | Gus Atkinson | 2023 | 2026 | 20 | 200 | 38 | 22.22 | 886 | 25 | 3/50 | 36.96 | 4 | 0 | |
| 271 | Sam Hain | 2023 | 2023 | 2 | 106 | 89 | 53.00 | 0 | – | – | – | 0 | 0 | |
| 272 | Tom Hartley | 2023 | 2023 | 2 | 12 | 12* | – | 60 | 0 | – | – | 0 | 0 | |
| 273 | George Scrimshaw | 2023 | 2023 | 1 | – | – | – | 52 | 3 | 3/66 | 22.00 | 0 | 0 | |
| 274 | Jamie Smith † | 2023 | 2025 | 19 | 392 | 64 | 21.77 | 0 | – | – | – | 9 | 0 | |
| 275 | Jacob Bethell | 2024 | 2026 | 24 | 712 | 110 | 33.90 | 346 | 9 | 2/33 | 47.77 | 4 | 0 | |
| 276 | Jordan Cox † | 2024 | 2026 | 8 | 165 | 76 | 23.57 | 0 | – | – | – | 4 | 1 | |
| 277 | Dan Mousley | 2024 | 2024 | 3 | 69 | 57 | 34.50 | 12 | 0 | – | – | 1 | 0 | |
| 278 | Jamie Overton | 2024 | 2026 | 19 | 314 | 68 | 22.42 | 710 | 22 | 3/22 | 30.22 | 12 | 0 | |
| 279 | John Turner | 2024 | 2024 | 2 | 2 | 2* | – | 66 | 2 | 2/42 | 34.00 | 0 | 0 | |
| 280 | Sonny Baker | 2025 | 2026 | 4 | 1 | 1* | 1.00 | 174 | 6 | 3/65 | 40.50 | 2 | 0 | |
| 281 | Josh Tongue | 2026 | 2026 | 5 | 1 | 1* | 0.50 | 215 | 5 | 3/79 | 49.00 | 0 | 0 | |
| 282 | Henry Crocombe | 2026 | 2026 | 2 | 8 | 8 | 8.00 | 55 | 2 | 1/27 | 42.00 | 0 | 0 | |
