= Jim Thomson (Scottish cricketer) =

Scottish cricketer (1940–2022)

Personal information
- Full name: James Thomson
- Born: 13 February 1940; Kilmarnock, Ayrshire, Scotland
- Died: 21 September 2022 (aged 82); Ayr, Scotland
- Batting: Right-handed
- Bowling: Slow left-arm orthodox

Domestic team information
- Years: Team
- 1962–1985: Scotland

Career statistics
Competition	First-class	List A
Matches	3	2
Runs scored	1	2
Batting average	1.00	2.00
100s/50s	0/0	0/0
Top score	1*	2*
Balls bowled	678	96
Wickets	7	1
Bowling average	42.42	47.00
5 wickets in innings	0	0
10 wickets in match	0	0
Best bowling	4/116	1/30
Catches/stumpings	2/–	1/–
- Source: Cricinfo, 31 July 2022

James Thomson (13 February 1940 – 21 September 2022) was a Scottish cricketer.

Thomson was born in February 1940 at Kilmarnock. A club cricketer for Kilmarnock, Thomson made his debut for Scotland in first-class cricket against Ireland at Greenock in 1962. There followed a gap of 22 years before his next appearance in first-class cricket for Scotland, which came against Ireland at Glasgow in 1984; this is the 15th longest gap between first-class appearances in the history of first-class cricket. He made a third and final first-class appearance, also against Ireland, the following year at Dublin.

Considered to be Scotland's premium slow left-arm bowler, he took seven wickets in his three first-class matches at an average of 42.42, with best figures of 4 for 116. Thomson made two appearances for Scotland in List A one-day cricket in the 1985 Benson & Hedges Cup against Derbyshire at Aberdeen and Nottinghamshire at Glasgow.
