= Simon Beattie (cricketer) =

Australian cricketer

Personal information
- Born: 10 December 1958 (age 67); Junee, New South Wales, Australia
- Batting: Right-handed
- Bowling: Right-arm medium
- Role: All-rounder

Domestic team information
- Years: Team
- 1982/83: Queensland
- Source: Cricinfo, 1 October 2020

Simon Beattie (born 10 December 1958) is an Australian cricketer. He played in one first-class match for Queensland in 1982/83. He was the last Warwick cricketer to represent Queensland in First-class cricket until Mark Steketee debuted in 2015.

Beattie began his cricket career in Warwick where he played representative cricket for a long time and was regarded as an all-rounder, although his bowling was stronger and he was seen as a bowler in state level cricket. He played for Sandgate-Redcliffe in Brisbane Grade Cricket for two years, making his first-grade debut in the 1982/83 season, commuting from Warwick to Brisbane for training and games.

He was selected for Queensland for one First-class game in the 1982/83 season due to multiple Queensland First XI players being selected in the Australian Test squad and he was described as a "strike bowler" when selected, however during the match he did not take a wicket and had his toe broken by Joel Garner while batting. He did not play First-class cricket again but in 1986 he was selected in a Queensland Country side which played the touring England Test team and he dismissed Chris Broad, Wilf Slack, and David Gower despite it being his first cricket match of the season as he was returning from a football injury.

Beattie also played rugby league for Warwick and played in two premierships for the Warwick Cowboys in 1987 and 1988 playing centre and he received an offer to play rugby league in England which he declined, instead remaining in Warwick where he lived until moving to Brisbane in 2014.

== See also ==
- List of Queensland first-class cricketers
