= Robin Jackman =

English cricketer (1945–2020)

Personal information
- Full name: Robin David Jackman
- Born: 13 August 1945; Simla, British India
- Died: 25 December 2020 (aged 75); Cape Town, Western Cape, South Africa
- Nickname: Jackers
- Height: 5 ft 9 in (1.75 m)
- Batting: Right-handed
- Bowling: Right-arm fast-medium

International information
- National side: England
- Test debut (cap 490): 13 March 1981 v West Indies
- Last Test: 26 August 1982 v Pakistan
- ODI debut (cap 29): 13 July 1974 v India
- Last ODI: 26 February 1983 v New Zealand

Domestic team information
- Years: Team
- 1966–1982: Surrey
- 1971/72: Western Province
- 1972/73–1976/77: Rhodesia
- 1979/80: Zimbabwe-Rhodesia

Career statistics
Competition	Test	ODI	FC	LA
Matches	4	15	399	288
Runs scored	42	54	5,685	1,564
Batting average	7.00	6.75	17.71	12.61
100s/50s	0/0	0/0	0/17	0/0
Top score	17	14	92*	46
Balls bowled	1,070	873	68,209	14,491
Wickets	14	19	1,402	439
Bowling average	31.78	31.47	22.80	21.10
5 wickets in innings	0	0	67	6
10 wickets in match	0	0	8	0
Best bowling	4/110	3/41	8/40	7/33
Catches/stumpings	0/–	4/–	177/–	51/–
- Source: CricketArchive, 16 December 2017

Robin David Jackman (13 August 1945 – 25 December 2020) was an English cricketer, who played in four Test matches and 15 One Day Internationals for the England cricket team between 1974 and 1983. He was a seam bowler and useful tail-end batsman. During a first-class career lasting from 1966 to 1982, he took 1,402 wickets. He was a member of the Surrey side that won the County Championship in 1971, and also played for Western Province in South Africa in 1971–72, and for Rhodesia between 1972–73 and 1979–80.

== Early life ==
Jackman was born in the northern Indian hill town of Shimla on 13 August 1945 where his father, a major with the 2nd Gurkha Rifles, was stationed. The family returned to Britain in 1946. As a child, Jackman initially had ambitions to become an actor until his uncle, the comedy actor Patrick Cargill, dissuaded Jackman from pursuing the career due to its low success rate. "In that case", replied the young Jackman, "I'll play cricket for Surrey and England instead."

In his developing years, Jackman was a batsman who could bowl off-spin. His father pulled him out of school at the age of 17, for he saw a future for his son as a professional cricketer. The young Jackman applied for a trial at Surrey and joined the club in 1964. It took him a couple of years to break into the first team, and during this time he switched to becoming a seam bowler. At 5 ft 9in tall, he was comparatively short for a seamer, and some felt he would struggle to prove himself at first-class county level, but Jackman worked hard to extract the absolute maximum from his talent, spending winters practising in South Africa.

== Career ==
He made his first-class debut in 1966 against Cambridge University and picked up three wickets in the first over of the second innings. He became a regular fixture in the Surrey first team during the 1968 season and was awarded a county cap in 1970. Within a couple of years he had become the mainstay of Surrey's bowling attack and claimed 50 wickets or more for nine successive seasons through the 1970s, often on unresponsive wickets, whilst his lower order batting also made frequent important contributions to the team. He became known for his wholehearted effort, his long, trundling run-up and side-on delivery action, and for his theatrically fierce and loud appealing for wickets.

Jackman was given the occasional outing by England in one-day internationals from 1974, but Geoff Arnold, Bob Willis, Chris Old and others kept him out of the Test side. At last, in 1980, it seemed likely that he might get a Test call-up as he finished the season with 121 first-class wickets (20 more than any other bowler), aided by the much improved pitches at The Oval and having a very ferocious new ball partner in Sylvester Clarke. His performances provoked regular calls for his inclusion in the England Test team, given that he was way ahead of any other seamer in English cricket and was thoroughly deserving of being one of Wisden's five Cricketers of the Year in the following spring's Almanack. But the England selectors, choosing a squad to tour West Indies in the winter of 1980/81, showed reluctance to pick a seamer who was by now 35 years old, and only placed him on the reserve list. It was felt that his last chance of Test Cricket had disappeared.

However, when Bob Willis had to withdraw from the tour with an injury after the first Test, Jackman was called up as his replacement and flew to Guyana to join the England squad for the second Test in Georgetown. The Guyanese government then revoked Jackman's visa because of his links with the then apartheid South Africa (Jackman was married to a South African woman and had spent several winters playing for Western Province and Rhodesia). Jackman had, in fact, warned the TCCB of his connections when he was put on the reserve list for the tour, but was told that it would not be a problem. When the Guyanese government learnt of Jackman's South African connections, they refused to allow him to play in the Test. The England team management countered that either their team as a whole should be accepted or they would withdraw from the match. The Second Test, due to be played at the Georgetown Cricket Club (GCC), was duly cancelled.

However, the governments of other Caribbean nations decided the tour could continue, and Jackman finally earned his first Test cap for England at Kensington Oval in Bridgetown, Barbados in the Third Test, where he removed Gordon Greenidge to a catch in the slips for his first wicket on the way to collecting 3–65. He appeared in the final Test as well and then had to wait just over a year before gaining two further outings, both against Pakistan, finishing with 14 wickets from four Test appearances. Inclusion on an Ashes tour to Australia followed but, despite England's lacklustre attack, he was not picked until the one-day internationals.

The final seasons of Jackman's Surrey career were to be among his most successful, and he played a leading role in the county reaching the final of the NatWest Trophy in 1982, where they trounced Warwickshire by nine wickets. After playing in an ODI for England against New Zealand in February 1983, he announced his retirement, just one short of 400 career First Class matches, in which he took 1,402 wickets. As a lower order batter, usually going in at 10, he also scored 17 domestic half-centuries with a career highest score of 92 not out.

He was then offered a coaching position in South Africa and he and his wife decided to relocate there permanently. Jackman later moved into broadcasting, and for many in South Africa he was 'the voice of cricket' during the transformative years in which the nation moved back into the international arena after so long in international isolation because of the apartheid regime. His voice sounded more gravelly but no less distinguished after he was treated for cancerous tumours on his vocal cords in 2012. Jackman then became a TV commentator on various international cricket tournaments; latterly, he was on the commentary team for the Indian Premier League. He did regular commentary for the South Africa-based pay-television channel SuperSport.

Cricket writer Colin Bateman commented that "few players have made a more dramatic impact on international cricket that Robin Jackman, although his actual test playing career was brief". Bateman added "a magnificent trier with a theatrical appeal, Jackman was a fine county fast-medium bowler who finally had his England chance". His England captain, Ian Botham, wrote "He was a captain's dream because he would run in all day and hardly bowl a bad ball. He had terrific ability too, which is reflected in his superb career figures. He was unlucky not to have played in more Test matches but there were a lot of good quick bowlers around at the time."

The cricket writer Alan Gibson gave Jackman the nickname of the "Shoreditch sparrow" during his playing career. However, Jackman had no obvious connection with the London district of Shoreditch.

== Personal life ==
Jackman met his future wife Yvonne when in South Africa in 1969. They would go on to marry in England, living in Bisley, Surrey for many years prior to relocating to South Africa after his retirement from playing cricket. The couple had two daughters. The couple celebrated their 50th wedding anniversary in November 2020. He died at his home in Cape Town on 25 December 2020, after lung and heart complications and testing positive for COVID-19 4 days earlier.

== Bibliography ==
- Jackman, Robin and Bryden, Colin (2012). Jackers: A Life in Cricket. Pitch Publishing Ltd. ISBN 978-1908051967.
