= Pat Whyte =

West Indian cricket umpire

Personal information
- Born: 13 January 1945 (age 81); Antigua

Umpiring information
- ODIs umpired: 4 (1983–1988)
- Source: Cricinfo, 31 May 2014

Patrick Cleofoster Whyte (born 13 January 1945) is a former West Indian cricket umpire. He stood in four ODI games between 1983 and 1988.

== See also ==
- List of One Day International cricket umpires
