= Thelston Payne =

Barbadian cricketer (1957–2023)

Personal information
- Full name: Thelston Rodney O'Neale Payne
- Born: 13 February 1957; Foul Bay, Saint Philip, Barbados
- Died: 10 May 2023 (aged 66); Bridgetown, Barbados
- Batting: Left-handed
- Role: Wicket-keeper

International information
- National side: West Indies
- Only Test (cap 187): 7 March 1986 v England
- ODI debut (cap 44): 19 April 1984 v Australia
- Last ODI: 28 March 1987 v New Zealand

Domestic team information
- Years: Team
- 1978–1990: Barbados

Career statistics
| Competition | Tests | ODIs | FC | LA |
|---|---|---|---|---|
| Matches | 1 | 7 | 68 | 38 |
| Runs scored | 5 | 126 | 3,391 | 795 |
| Batting average | 5.00 | 31.50 | 36.85 | 29.44 |
| 100s/50s | 0/0 | 0/1 | 6/25 | 1/3 |
| Top score | 5 | 60 | 140 | 100* |
| Catches/stumpings | 5/0 | 6/0 | 103/8 | 30/3 |
- Source: CricketArchive, 19 October 2010

Thelston Rodney O'Neale Payne (13 February 1957 – 10 May 2023) was a Barbadian cricketer who played one Test match and seven One Day Internationals for the West Indies.

== Test career ==
Payne played first-class cricket from 1978–79 to 1989–90, turning out in 68 first class matches, mostly for Barbados. He was usually second-choice wicket-keeper to Jeff Dujon in the West Indies team, but got his Test chance in the 1985–86 series against England in the West Indies, when Dujon was injured. He held five catches in the West Indies' seven-wicket win, but scored only five runs.

== ODI career ==
In his seven ODIs, he was always in and out of the team, and he only played in two successive matches – in the 1986–87 World Series Cup. That was his penultimate ODI – his last was against New Zealand two months later, during which he held a catch off Richard Hadlee's bat, but did not get to bat because Gordon Greenidge and Desmond Haynes wrapped up the target without losing a wicket. He was part of the West indies squad in the World Championship of Cricket in 1985.

== Death ==
Payne died from pancreatic cancer in Bridgetown, on 10 May 2023, at the age of 66.
