= David Smith (cricketer, born 1956) =

English cricketer (born 1956)

Personal information
- Full name: David Mark Smith
- Born: 9 January 1956 (age 70); Balham, London, England
- Batting: Left-handed
- Bowling: Right-arm medium

Career statistics
Competition	Test	ODI
Matches	2	2
Runs scored	80	15
Batting average	20.00	15.00
100s/50s	0/0	0/0
Top score	47	10*
Catches/stumpings	0/–	0/–
- Source: CricInfo, 1 January 2006

David Mark Smith (born 9 January 1956) is an English former cricketer, who played in two Test matches and two One Day Internationals for England from 1986 to 1990.

Standing 6 feet 4 inches tall, Smith was a dominating opening batsman, particularly renowned for his skill and bravery in facing fast bowling. His volatile nature saw him sacked and re-employed three times by Surrey.

== Life and career ==
He began his county career at Surrey in 1973, spending over a decade there before moving to Worcestershire in 1984, and was then selected for the England tour to the West Indies in 1985–86. After failing in his debut Test in Kingston, he top scored in both innings against the formidable West Indies attack in the second Test, before missing the rest of the tour with a back injury.

After a brief return to Surrey, he moved to Sussex in 1989, and that winter was again summoned to the Caribbean after an injury to Graham Gooch. Unfortunately for Smith, he broke his thumb in his first tour match, and did not play in any of the Tests.

In the 1993 NatWest Trophy final he scored 124, only to see his side lose a remarkable match to Warwickshire. After retiring from the team, he joined the Sussex coaching staff.

In a career of 319 first-class games, he scored 15,265 runs at an average of 36.17, with a highest score of 213. He scored 28 centuries and 76 half-centuries and held 204 catches.
