= Les Taylor (cricketer) =

English cricketer (born 1953)

Personal information
- Full name: Leslie Brian Taylor
- Born: 25 October 1953 (age 73); Earl Shilton, Leicestershire, England
- Batting: Right-handed
- Bowling: Right-arm fast-medium

Career statistics
Competition	Test	ODI	FC
Matches	2	2	218
Runs scored	1	1	1,061
Batting average	–	–	9.38
100s/50s	0/0	0/0	0/1
Top score	1*	1*	60
Balls bowled	381	84	31,480
Wickets	4	0	581
Bowling average	44.50	–	25.21
5 wickets in innings	0	–	18
10 wickets in match	0	–	1
Best bowling	2/34	–	7/28
Catches/stumpings	1/–	0/–	53/–
- Source: Cricinfo, 25 March 2026

Leslie Brian Taylor (born 25 October 1953) is an English former cricketer who played in two Test matches against Australia in 1985. His first-class cricket was played for Leicestershire and in South Africa for Natal.

The cricket writer Colin Bateman wrote: "His seam bowling was not pretty but it was hostile and effective, while his flailing batting was pure entertainment". His career was interrupted by a series of injuries.

== Life and career ==
A former miner, Taylor's first-class cricket career started somewhat belatedly at the age of 23.

A solidly-built fast-medium bowler and a reliable county performer over many years, Taylor's chance of Test selection seemed to have gone when he received a three-year ban for joining the Graham Gooch-led rebel tour to South Africa in 1982, where he was the leading bowler with 11 wickets at 18.72 to his name.

After his two Test appearances in 1985, Taylor won selection to the winter tour to the West Indies, but was dubbed "Lord Lucan" by certain members of the press due to his lack of matches on tour and a passing visual resemblance to the "missing" aristocrat. Taylor appeared in just one One Day International on the tour, but was picked for a second on his return home in the series against India.

The highlight of his brief and modest international career was taking the wicket of Murray Bennett at the Oval in 1985. The wicket confirmed England's victory in the sixth test and thus their victory in the Ashes series that year. This proved to be the last time England would win a home Ashes series for twenty years.

His batting ability was such than on one occasion with his county needing only 20 runs to avoid the follow-on, Taylor arrived at the batting crease to face the rampaging Sylvester Clarke. David Gower, the Leicestershire captain, shook his head. "I just can't do it," he said, and promptly declared.

By the time he had retired from first-class cricket in 1990, Taylor had taken 581 wickets at 25.21 apiece.

Taylor went on to work for Royal Mail as a postman many years after his retirement from cricket.
