= Wilf Slack =

English cricketer

Personal information
- Full name: Wilfred Norris Slack
- Born: 12 December 1954; Troumaca, St Vincent
- Died: 15 January 1989 (aged 34); Banjul, The Gambia
- Nickname: Wilf, Slacky
- Height: 5 ft 10 in (1.78 m)
- Batting: Left-handed
- Bowling: Right-arm medium
- Role: Batsman

International information
- National side: England
- Test debut (cap 516): 7 March 1986 v West Indies
- Last Test: 19 June 1986 v India
- ODI debut (cap 87): 4 March 1986 v West Indies
- Last ODI: 19 March 1986 v West Indies

Domestic team information
- Years: Team
- 1977–1988: Middlesex
- 1981–1983: Windward Islands

Career statistics
Competition	Test	ODI	FC	LA
Matches	3	2	237	183
Runs scored	81	43	13,950	4,639
Batting average	13.50	21.50	38.96	30.32
100s/50s	0/1	0/0	25/75	3/31
Top score	52	34	248*	122*
Balls bowled	–	–	1,519	1,766
Wickets	–	–	21	45
Bowling average	–	–	32.76	30.04
5 wickets in innings	–	–	0	1
10 wickets in match	–	–	0	0
Best bowling	–	–	3/17	5/32
Catches/stumpings	3/–	0/–	174/–	36/–
- Source: CricketArchive, 27 November 2008

Wilfred Norris Slack (12 December 1954 – 15 January 1989) was an English cricketer, who played in three Test matches and two One Day Internationals for England in 1986.

A left-handed opening batsman, Slack was a victim of mysterious blackouts while playing, and he died, apparently of a heart attack, while batting in The Gambia, aged 34.

== Early life ==
Slack's family migrated from the Windward Islands to High Wycombe in Buckinghamshire, England, when he was 11 years old.

He was a left-handed opener and played county cricket for Middlesex between 1977 and 1988. He also played for his native Windward Islands in their opening seasons of the West Indies domestic competition in 1981–82 and 1982–83, at the request of Michael Findlay, the former West Indian wicket-keeper to whom he was distantly related.

He attended Wellesbourne School in High Wycombe. Later he spent time playing cricket for Frieth and High Wycombe cricket clubs, progressing into the Buckinghamshire team in 1976, at the age of 21, becoming the minor county's leading run-scorer for the season, with 748. The Middlesex coach, Don Bennett, marked him as first-class county material, and he was signed by them the next year.

== Middlesex career ==
Slack made his Middlesex debut in 1977, but failed to establish himself in the side, in part because he played out of position, in the middle order.

When Mike Brearley, Middlesex captain and batsman, was recalled to the England side in 1981, Slack was called on to replace Brearley and open the batting for Middlesex against Kent at Lord's; he scored his maiden first-class century, 181 not out. The unbroken stand of 367 by Slack and his partner (Graham Barlow) was a Middlesex record. In the following game he made 248 not out, against Worcestershire; both were scored in the second innings. He finished the season with 1,303 Championship runs at 48.25. This auspicious opening with Barlow foreshadowed their profitable partnership, one of the best opening pairs in the County Championship circuit of that era, until Barlow retired in 1986, which along with domestic problems affected Slack's form. Slack completed 1,000 runs in a season eight times. Slack was part of a successful Middlesex side, winning the County Championship in 1982 and 1985, the 1983 Benson & Hedges Cup and the 1984 NatWest Trophy. In 1985 he bettered his effort of four years earlier by making 1,900 runs at 54.28, and was rewarded with a tour of Sri Lanka with the England B side. Slack enjoyed success on this tour, making 96 in the first unofficial 'Test', 85 in the third unofficial 'Test', and 122 not out in the last unofficial 'one day international'.

Simon Hughes wrote of him in A Lot of Hard Yakka: "Wilf Slack, a reserved Windward Islander who never betrayed any nerves despite the daily task of standing up to some of the fastest bowlers in the world, rarely said anything when he came back into the dressing-room. He’d sit down, quietly unbuckle his pads, and carefully lay them to rest in his case, then stare glumly into space for a while. He was deeply religious, which was possibly an explanation for such contemplation". Besides holding nearly 200 catches, many at bat-pad, he was always eager to bowl his military-medium pace, especially in limited-overs matches.

== International career ==
Whilst in Sri Lanka, Slack was rushed to the West Indies during England's 1985–86 tour to replace the injured Mike Gatting. Slack made just two runs in the two innings of his Test debut at Port-of-Spain. As a result, he was dropped for the next two Tests, but returned in the Fifth Test in Antigua to make a tidy 52, partnering Graham Gooch in an opening stand of 127. He also played two one-day internationals on this tour, sharing another stand of 89 with Gooch in the first (his full international debut), second top-scoring (behind Gooch) to help England to their only international victory on this tour.

His third and final Test came at Headingley against India in 1986. He again failed to impress but had a successful county season by topping 1,000 runs once more, also helping Middlesex to win the 1986 Benson & Hedges Cup. This won him a place in the England squad for the Ashes tour of Australia in 1986–87. He did not play a Test or one-day international on the tour, and was never again picked for England. However he continued to enjoy success with Middlesex and won the NatWest Trophy again with them in 1988.

== Ill-health and death ==
During the 1988 English cricket season, Slack suffered a number of blackouts on the field or in the nets, but exhaustive tests had failed to identify the cause. One such incident, witnessed by Mickey Stewart, took place during a net session in Tasmania, during the 1986–7 England tour of Australia:

One minute I looked and he was fine, the next minute he had passed out and we had to rush him to hospital ... There was no indication that what he was suffering from was life-threatening.

He died at the age of 34 after collapsing during a game in The Gambia.

A popular figure in the game, Slack's Wisden obituary commented on the response to his death:

He was particularly popular among fellow-cricketers, who spoke feelingly of their respect and sorrow when he died. He was mourned, too, in New Zealand, where he coached in five English winters. Slack was buried in his prized England blazer, bat at his side, and as the funeral cortege drove past Lord's, the Grace Gates bore a sign reading "Farewell Wilf".

== Legacy ==
Slack played 237 first-class matches, with 13,950 runs at 38.96, including 25 centuries.

In a tribute to their former player, Middlesex renamed one of their outlying grounds in honour of Slack. The former Barnet Council ground in East End Road, Finchley was, in 1995, renamed the "Wilf Slack Ground, Finchley". Middlesex play second XI and minor county cricket matches at the ground. In the same year, Middlesex also introduced ECG testing for players during pre-season medicals.

In 2022, Middlesex opened the "Wilf Slack Cricket Centre" to "provide more opportunities for members of the local community, local recreational clubs, local schools, Middlesex Cricket’s Women and Girls squads, Disability squads, and Middlesex’s Participation Team". His sister, Phyllis, cut the ribbon.

== See also ==
- List of fatalities while playing cricket
