= Lloyd Barker (umpire) =

Barbadian cricket umpire (born 1943)

Personal information
- Full name: Lloyd Hamilton Barker
- Born: 26 September 1943 (age 83); Spooners Hill, St Michael, Barbados
- Batting: Right-handed
- Role: Umpire

Umpiring information
- Tests umpired: 29 (1984–1997)
- ODIs umpired: 37 (1984–1997)
- Source: Cricinfo, 18 June 2013

Lloyd Hamilton Barker (born 26 September 1943, Barbados) is a cricket umpire who officiated in 29 Tests and 37 One Day Internationals from 1984 to 1997. Barker's first Test as umpire was the Third Test between the West Indies and Australia in 1984. He officiated in the first ever Test between Sri Lanka and Zimbabwe at Harare in October 1994 as the neutral umpire; his on-field colleague for that match was Ian Robinson.

Barker is a former president of the Barbados Cricket Umpires Association.

== See also ==
- List of Test cricket umpires
- List of One Day International cricket umpires
