= David Narine =

West Indian cricket umpire (born 1949)

Personal information
- Full name: David Joaquin Narine
- Born: 16 August 1949 (age 77); Guyana

Umpiring information
- Tests umpired: 3 (1983–1985)
- ODIs umpired: 4 (1981–1985)
- Source: Cricinfo, 14 July 2013

David Narine (born 16 August 1949) is a West Indian former cricket umpire. He stood in three Test matches between 1983 and 1985 and four One Day International fixtures between 1981 and 1985.

== See also ==
- List of Test cricket umpires
- List of One Day International cricket umpires
