= Johnny Gayle =

West Indian cricket umpire (1923–2020)

Personal information
- Full name: John Richard Gayle
- Born: 30 November 1923; St Elizabeth, Jamaica
- Died: 15 September 2020 (aged 96); Jamaica

Umpiring information
- Tests umpired: 3 (1972–1986)
- ODIs umpired: 2 (1984–1988)
- WTests umpired: 2 (1976)
- Source: Cricinfo, 6 July 2013

John Richard Gayle (30 November 1923 – 15 September 2020) was a West Indian cricket umpire. The five international fixtures he umpired in included three Test matches, between 1972 and 1986. He also officiated in two One Day International games between 1984 and 1988. Overall, he umpired 34 first-class matches, all but two of them in Jamaica, between 1970 and 1988.

Gayle worked for Jamaica's ministry of agriculture, and was an expert on the cultivation of pimentos. He died in Jamaica on 15 September 2020, aged 96.
