= Malcolm Marshall =

Barbadian cricketer (1958–1999)

Personal information
- Full name: Malcolm Denzil Marshall
- Born: 18 April 1958; Bridgetown, Barbados
- Died: 4 November 1999 (aged 41); Bridgetown, Barbados
- Height: 180 cm (5 ft 11 in)
- Batting: Right-handed
- Bowling: Right-arm fast
- Role: Bowler

International information
- National side: West Indies
- Test debut (cap 172): 15 December 1978 v India
- Last Test: 8 August 1991 v England
- ODI debut (cap 33): 28 May 1980 v England
- Last ODI: 8 March 1992 v New Zealand

Domestic team information
- Years: Team
- 1977–1991: Barbados
- 1979–1993: Hampshire
- 1992–1996: Natal
- 1995: Scotland

Career statistics
Competition	Test	ODI	FC	LA
Matches	81	136	408	440
Runs scored	1,810	955	11,004	3,795
Batting average	18.85	14.92	24.83	16.86
100s/50s	0/10	0/2	7/54	0/8
Top score	92	66	120*	77
Balls bowled	17,584	7,175	74,645	22,332
Wickets	376	157	1,651	521
Bowling average	20.94	26.96	19.10	23.71
5 wickets in innings	22	0	85	4
10 wickets in match	4	0	13	0
Best bowling	7/22	4/18	8/71	5/13
Catches/stumpings	25/–	15/–	145/–	68/–
Medal record
Men's Cricket
Representing West Indies
ICC Cricket World Cup
Winner	1979 England
Runner-up	1983 England and Wales
- Source: CricketArchive, 11 January 2009

Malcolm Denzil Marshall (18 April 1958 – 4 November 1999) was a Barbadian international cricketer who played for the West Indies cricket team from 1978 to 1992 in Tests and One Day Internationals. Marshall is widely regarded as one of the greatest fast bowlers of all time. He is often acknowledged as the greatest West Indian fast bowler of all time, and one of the most complete fast bowlers in the history of cricket. His Test bowling average of 20.94 is the best of any cricketer to have taken 300 or more wickets.

Marshall achieved his bowling success despite being notably shorter than other contemporary fast bowlers. He generated pace and threat from his bowling action and use of the bouncer. He also statistically went on to become the most successful Test match bowler of the 1980s, taking 235 wickets at an average of 18.47 in a period of five years. Marshall was a part of the West Indies team that won the 1979 Cricket World Cup, as well as the team that reached the 1983 Cricket World Cup Final.

Marshall was also a capable lower middle-order batsman with ten Test fifties and seven first-class centuries. He ended his career as the all-time highest wicket taker for the West Indies in Test cricket with 376 wickets, a record which he held up until November 1998 before Courtney Walsh surpassed his milestone.

In 2009, Marshall was inducted into the ICC Cricket Hall of Fame. To mark 150 years of the Cricketers' Almanack, Wisden named him in an all-time Test World XI.

== Early years ==
Marshall was born in Bridgetown, Barbados. His father, Denzil DeCoster Edghill, a policeman, was also a cricketer who played for Kingspark Cricket Club in St. Philip, and the son of Claudine Edghill and Guirdwood Ifill. He died in a traffic accident when Marshall was one year old. His mother was Eleanor Welch. Malcolm had three half-brothers and three half-sisters. He grew up in the parish of Saint Michael, Barbados and was educated at St Giles Boys' School from 1963 to 1969 and then at Parkinson Comprehensive from 1969 to 1973.

He was partly taught cricket by his grandfather, who helped to bring him up after his father's death. He idolised West Indies all-rounder Sir Garfield Sobers from a young age, having started admiring Sobers after watching his test century against New Zealand in 1972. He played cricket for the Banks Brewery team from 1976. His first representative match was a 40-over match for the West Indies Young Cricketers against their English counterparts at Pointe-à-Pierre, Trinidad and Tobago in August 1976. He scored nought with the bat and went for 53 runs off eight overs.

Marshall made his senior debut in the Geddes Grant/Harrison Line Trophy for Barbados on 13 February 1978; he was dismissed without scoring and did not take a wicket. Four days later, he made his first-class debut against Jamaica, and he took 6 for 77 in the first innings, whilst failing to score with the bat. On the back of this single first-class appearance he was selected in the West Indies team to tour India in 1978/79, with many first-choice West Indian players being unavailable due to the World Series Cricket. Marshall heard of his selection on the radio while working in the storeroom at Banks Brewery and later claimed he did not know where India was.

== International debut ==
Marshall made his test debut in the second test against India at Bangalore on 15 December 1978. He made little impact in the three Tests he played on that tour. Meanwhile, he took 37 wickets in first-class cricket, and was signed by Hampshire as their overseas player and successor to Andy Roberts for 1979, remaining with the county until 1993. He was selected in the West Indies' World Cup-winning squad, but did not play in the tournament. Despite Hampshire's poor form, Marshall took 47 wickets, including 5–13 against Glamorgan in the John Player League.

Marshall came to prominence in 1980, when in the third Test against England at Old Trafford he dismissed Mike Gatting, Brian Rose, and Peter Willey in quick succession to spark an England collapse, although the match was eventually drawn. Marshall finished with figures of 3–36 in the first innings and 2–116 in the second. After 1980/81, he was left out of the Test side for two years, but had an excellent 1982 season with Hampshire, taking 134 wickets at an average of under 16, including a career-best 8–71 against Worcestershire. That performance saw him recalled to the West Indies team, in which he remained until the end of his international career. As of 2026, Marshall's 134 wickets in the 1982 season remains the highest number of first-class wickets taken by any bowler in an English season since a reduction in the annual number of County Championship matches in 1969.

Marshall took 21 or more wickets in each of seven successive Test series from 1982/83 to 1985/86, averaging under 20 in the last five. His most productive series in this period was the 1983/84 series against India, in which he took 33 wickets as well as averaging 34 with the bat and making his highest Test score of 92 at Kanpur. A few months later, two five-wicket hauls at home against Australia. In 1982, he signed a one-year contract with Melbourne Sub-District side Moorabbin, becoming the first active international cricketer to sign for a team in the Sub-District league. Marshall was reportedly approached by the Moorabbin officials during the first test match between Australia and West Indies at Melbourne after learning that Marshall was interested in playing domestic cricket in Australia. He turned down an offer of US$1 million to join a rebel West Indies team on a tour to South Africa, who were still suffering international sporting isolation due to apartheid.

== At the peak ==
I had my first encounter with Malcolm at the beginning of my first-class career in 1988 when Trinidad and Tobago was playing against Barbados. The first delivery I faced in the match was from Malcolm and of course his reputation with the ball preceded him. I was scared, my heart was pumping and I was out caught down the leg-side first ball. As he went past me with his hands in the air he stopped and touched me on the shoulder and said 'Tough luck!' That was the first time I had got close to him.

— Brian Lara describing the first time he faced Marshall.

Marshall relinquished his county duties during the 1984 tour of England, which resulted in a 5–0 series win. Marshall took the second-most wickets in the series with 24, behind only Joel Garner who took 29, and established his reputation as one of the best bowlers in the world. In the series, he took three five-wicket hauls, had the best bowling average of 18.20, and the best strike rate of 41.91.

In the first test at Edgbaston, which the West Indies won by an innings and 180 runs, Marshall bowled a bouncer to Warwickshire opener Andy Lloyd half an hour into the match that struck him on the temple behind his right eye. Lloyd retired hurt, suffering blurred vision in his right eye, and was hospitalized for several days. Lloyd remained on 10 runs and never went onto play international cricket again.

In the third Test at Headingley, Marshall finished with figures of 7–53 in the second innings, despite having broken his thumb in two different places attempting to field a stroke played by Chris Broad on the first morning of play. He bat at number 11 in West Indies' first innings despite his injury, with one arm in plaster, so that Larry Gomes could complete an unbeaten century. Marshall himself also scored a boundary. His batting and bowling with a broken thumb also impressed captain Clive Lloyd who recalled the incident as one of the greatest and most courageous efforts that he ever witnessed during his playing career.

In 1984/85 Marshall had another successful home series against New Zealand, despite suggestions that his bouncers were intimidatory beyond what was acceptable, and that Marshall should have been admonished by the umpires. In a one-day match in February 1986, a rising delivery from Marshall broke the nose of England batsman Mike Gatting; Marshall later found bone fragments embedded in the leather of the ball. As well as his use of the bouncer, Marshall found success in swinging the ball in both directions, developing an in-swinging yorker as well as a leg-cutter.

Marshall completed his career-best Test performance of 7–22 at Old Trafford in 1988, ending the series with 35 wickets in five Tests at an average of 12.65. Towards the end of his international career he took 11 wickets against India at Port of Spain the following winter, and played his last Test at The Oval in 1991. His 376th and final Test wicket was that of Graham Gooch. He retained the number 1 ranking in ICC Test Bowling Rankings for the year 1990 (which he attained in 1989).

== Later career ==
Marshall's final appearances for the West Indies came in One Day International cricket in the 1992 World Cup. He took two wickets in the five games he played in the tournament, both in the penultimate game against South Africa at Christchurch, the only time Marshall played for the West Indies against South Africa in his international career, though he played provincial cricket for Natal in 1992/93 and 1993/94. Whilst playing at Natal, his experience was an influence in the early career of Shaun Pollock, who attributes much of his success to his former mentor.

Having missed out on Hampshire's earlier one-day triumphs in the Benson and Hedges Cup in 1988 and the Nat West Trophy in 1991 because of touring commitments with the West Indies, Marshall was in the Hampshire team that won the 1992 Benson and Hedges Cup. He played his last season for Hampshire in 1993, taking 28 wickets at an average of around 30. He played for a West Indies XI against Hampshire in a benefit match at the County Ground, Southampton in September 1993, and was cheered off the pitch after his dismissal. Marshall also dismissed David Gower while bowling off-spin. In 1994 he played for the Scarborough President's XI against the South Africans during the Festival. He played five matches for Scotland in the 1995 Benson and Hedges Cup without much success, and his last senior games were for Natal in 1995/96. In his final senior appearance, against Western Province in a limited-overs game at Cape Town, he took the wicket of his former international teammate Desmond Haynes. He took a total of 1,065 wickets for Hampshire.

== Illness, death and legacy ==
In 1996, Marshall was appointed coach of both Hampshire and the West Indies, although the latter's steadily declining standards during this period brought a considerable amount of criticism his way. During the 1999 World Cup it was revealed that Marshall had colon cancer. He immediately left his coaching job to begin treatment, which was ultimately unsuccessful. He married his long-term partner, Connie Roberta Earle, in Romsey on 25 September 1999, and returned to his home town, where he died on 4 November aged 41, weighing little more than 25 kg.

"The worldwide outpouring of grief," wrote journalist-friend Pat Symes, "was testimony to the genuine love and admiration he engendered." At the funeral service at the Garfield Sobers Gymnasium in Wildey, Barbados, former West Indian fast bowler Rev. Wes Hall whispered the last rites in the belief that Marshall, having found God again in the last few weeks of his life, was off to Heaven. His coffin was carried at the service by five West Indian captains. He was buried at St Bartholomew's Church, Barbados.

The Malcolm Marshall Memorial Trophy was inaugurated in his memory, to be awarded to the leading wicket-taker in each England v West Indies Test series. Another trophy with the same name was set up to be the prize in an annual game between Barbados and Trinidad and Tobago.

Malcolm Marshall Memorial cricket games are also played in Handsworth Park, Birmingham, England. On the Sunday of the UK's August bank holiday, invitation XIs play against an individual's "select eleven".

The entrance road to Hampshire's ground the Rose Bowl is called Marshall Drive in memory of Marshall and another West Indian Hampshire great Roy Marshall.

His former Hampshire captain, Mark Nicholas, wrote a moving tribute to him.

In the Bollywood film 83, Marshall's role was played by his son Mali Marshall.

== See also ==
- List of international cricket five-wicket hauls by Malcolm Marshall

== Bibliography ==
- Symes, Pat. "Memories of Maco." The Wisden Cricketer, May 2008.

Sporting positions
Preceded by Tim Tremlett	Hampshire cricket coach 1996–1999	Succeeded by Jimmy Cook
