= Sadique Mohammed =

West Indian cricket umpire

Personal information
- Born: 1 August 1938 (age 88); Trinidad

Umpiring information
- Tests umpired: 3 (1981–1986)
- ODIs umpired: 7 (1981–1986)
- Source: Cricinfo, 13 July 2013

Sadique Mohammed (born 1 August 1938) is a West Indian former cricket umpire. He stood in three Test matches between 1981 and 1986 and seven One Day International (ODI) games between 1981 and 1986.

== See also ==
- List of Test cricket umpires
- List of One Day International cricket umpires
