= Clyde Cumberbatch =

Trinidad and Tobago cricket umpire

Personal information
- Full name: Clyde Elliot Cumberbatch
- Born: 13 November 1936; Port-of-Spain, Trinidad
- Died: 29 December 2017 (aged 81)
- Role: Umpire

Umpiring information
- Tests umpired: 12 (1981–1995)
- ODIs umpired: 26 (1984–1997)
- FC umpired: 63 (1979–1997)
- LA umpired: 49 (1979–1997)
- Source: CricketArchive, 18 June 2013

Clyde Elliot Cumberbatch (13 November 1936 – 29 December 2017) was a cricket umpire from Trinidad and Tobago who officiated in 38 international fixtures. He stood in twelve Test matches, all involving the West Indies cricket team. He also umpired in 26 One Day Internationals games between 1984 and 1997.

== Umpiring career ==
Cumberbatch made his debut at first-class and List A in 1979. He reached Test cricket level in 1981.

== See also ==
- List of Test cricket umpires
- List of One Day International cricket umpires
