= Australian cricket team in England in 1993 =

International cricket tour

Australia cricket team in England in 1993
	Australia	England
- Dates: 30 April – 23 August 1993
Captains	Allan Border	Graham Gooch (1st–4th Tests); Mike Atherton (5th and 6th Tests)

Test series
- Result: Australia won the 6-match series 4–1
Most runs	David Boon (555)	Graham Gooch (673)
Most wickets	Shane Warne (34)	Peter Such (16)
- Player of the series: Graham Gooch and Shane Warne

One Day International series
- Results: Australia won the 3-match series 3–0
Most runs	Mark Waugh (183)	Robin Smith (182)
Most wickets	Craig McDermott (7)	Chris Lewis (5)

The Australia national cricket team toured England in 1993 aiming to retain The Ashes for a second consecutive occasion, having successfully defended them on home turf in the 1990/91 season.

Six Test matches were scheduled, of which Australia won four and England one, with one match drawn. Australia won the Texaco Trophy series that preceded the Tests 3–0.

The gulf in quality between the sides was vast, and was emphasised by the fact that nine of Australia's team played all six tests, while England used 24 players in the series, including seven debutants. One of the surprises among the inconsistent selection was the regular selection of Alec Stewart as wicketkeeper and middle-order batsman, rather than a specialist wicketkeeper that would allow Stewart to open the batting.

Coming off a series defeat in India, England were low in confidence, and even their star performer in India and Sri Lanka, Graeme Hick, was still considered to be fighting for his place, judging by comments to the media by coach Keith Fletcher. Graham Gooch resigned the captaincy after the Fourth Test, once the series was decided, and Mike Atherton led the side in the final two tests, winning the Sixth, at The Oval.

== Squads ==
England	Australia
Graham Gooch (c); Alec Stewart (wk); Mike Atherton; Martin Bicknell; Andy Caddick; Phillip DeFreitas; John Emburey; Neil Foster; Angus Fraser; Mike Gatting; Graeme Hick; Nasser Hussain; Mark Ilott; Mark Lathwell; Chris Lewis; Devon Malcolm; Matthew Maynard; Martin McCague; Mark Ramprakash; Robin Smith; Alec Stewart; Peter Such; Graham Thorpe; Phil Tufnell; Steve Watkin; Dominic Cork (ODIs only); Neil Fairbrother (ODIs only); Paul Jarvis (ODIs only); Derek Pringle (ODIs only); Dermot Reeve (ODIs only)	Allan Border (c); Ian Healy (wk); David Boon; Matthew Hayden; Wayne Holdsworth; Merv Hughes; Brendon Julian; Damien Martyn; Tim May; Craig McDermott; Paul Reiffel; Michael Slater; Mark Taylor; Shane Warne; Mark Waugh; Steve Waugh; Tim Zoehrer

== Test series ==
=== First Test (3–7 June) ===
3–7 June
Scorecard

Australia	v	England
289 (112.3 overs); MA Taylor 124 (233); PM Such 6/67 [33.3]		210 (74.5 overs); GA Gooch 65 (137); SK Warne 4/51 [24]
432/5d (130 overs); IA Healy 102* (133); PM Such 2/78 [31]		332 (120.2 overs); GA Gooch 133 (247); SK Warne 4/86 [49]

Australia won by 179 runs
Old Trafford, Manchester
Umpires: HD Bird (Eng) and KE Palmer (Eng)
Player of the match: SK Warne (Aus)

- England won the toss and elected to field.
- BP Julian, MJ Slater (both Aus), AR Caddick and PM Such (both Eng) made their Test debuts.

Four players debuted in the First Test: Andy Caddick and Peter Such for England and Brendon Julian and Michael Slater for the tourists. The new Australian opening partnership of Slater and Mark Taylor dominated the first part of the first day, putting on 128 for the first wicket, but it was Such who shared the spoils with his fellow debutant, taking six wickets in the innings, including that of Taylor who had made a superb 124, his third century against England.

The England reply is remembered primarily for Shane Warne's first delivery of the series, a drifting delivery to Mike Gatting that pitched outside leg stump, then turned sharply, beating Gatting's bat and clipping the top of off stump. Aside from that particular moment, the only real highlight was Gooch's 65, before he too fell victim to Warne.

Australia looked in trouble in their second innings at 46/2, with Such again proving the worth of his selection, but David Boon (93) and Mark Waugh (64) added a century to steady the visitors' nerves, before Steve Waugh (78*) and Ian Healy (with his maiden Test century - 102*) took the attack to the bowling and helped Border set a huge target by declaring on 432/5.

England's theoretical run chase got off to a good start - Gooch put on 73 with Mike Atherton and a further 60 with Gatting and 52 with Graeme Hick. Gooch was then dismissed in unusual fashion for handling the ball, after which the collapse set in. Only Chris Lewis (43) made any other significant contribution to the innings, as Warne (4-86) and Merv Hughes (4-92) rattled through the hosts' tail.

=== Second Test (17–21 June) ===
17–21 June
Scorecard

Australia	v	England
632/4d (196 overs); DC Boon 164* (378); PCR Tufnell 2/129 [39]		205 (99 overs); MA Atherton 80 (210); MG Hughes 4/52 [20]
		365 (f/o) (165.5 overs); MA Atherton 99 (215); TBA May 4/81 [51]

Australia won by an innings and 62 runs
Lord's, London
Umpires: MJ Kitchen (Eng) and DR Shepherd (Eng)
Player of the match: MJ Slater (Aus)

- Australia won the toss and elected to bat.

For England Neil Foster returned to the side in place of the injured DeFreitas, while the Australians played Tim May as a second spinner at the expense of Julian. Australia won the toss and made the most of excellent batting conditions. Taylor and Slater demolished the England bowling as they added 260 for the first wicket, and batted almost the entire day. Both fell in the hour prior to the close after compiling superb centuries. Taylor's second of the series (111) was made off 243 balls and comprised ten fours and a six, while Slater's 152 rattled along a bit faster, and included 18 boundaries. Boon and Mark Waugh took up the gauntlet on the second day and added another 175 to rub it in, with Waugh falling to Phil Tufnell just one shy of his century. Boon went on to enjoy another century partnership with Allan Border (77), before the captain finally declared the innings on the third morning, Boon ending up not out on 164.

England's reply was built around a solid 80 from Atherton, but his was the only significant resistance as Hughes (4-52), Warne (4-57) and May (2-64) ripped through the other batsmen with relative ease, Australia not even hampered by Craig McDermott's not being available to bowl. Robin Smith and Hick got starts but couldn't capitalise, and England were bowled out early on the fourth morning. Following on, England put up a stronger fight: Atherton and Gooch added 71 for the first wicket and Atherton and Gatting another century, before the former was cruelly run out on 99 as he slipped turning back to regain his ground after turning down a third run.

Gatting, Hick and Stewart all contributed half-centuries to the cause, but with a first innings deficit of over 400 they had needed to turn them into big centuries if England were to save the game, and the Australian bowlers kept plugging away, with May and Warne picking up four wickets apiece in a combined marathon of just one ball short of a hundred overs. Border picked up the other wicket with his occasional spin, and really stifled the batsmen - his 16 overs cost just 16 runs.

The last four wickets fell quickly on the final day, when it appeared as though England might hold out for a draw against all odds. From 361/6, Stewart's dismissal heralded the final collapse, and Foster, Such and Tufnell surrendered meekly, leaving England all out on 365.

=== Third Test (1–6 July) ===
1–6 July
Scorecard

England	v	Australia
321 (118.4 overs); RA Smith 86 (113); MG Hughes 5/92 [31]		373 (108.3 overs); DC Boon 101 (177); MJ McCague 4/121 [32.3]
422/6d (155 overs); GA Gooch 120 (265); SK Warne 3/108 [50]		202/6 (76 overs); BP Julian 56* (103); AR Caddick 3/32 [16]

Match drawn
Trent Bridge, Nottingham
Umpires: BJ Meyer (Eng) and R Palmer (Eng)
Player of the match: GP Thorpe (Eng)

- England won the toss and elected to bat.
- MC Ilott, MN Lathwell, MJ McCague and GP Thorpe (all Eng) made their Test debuts.

England rang the changes for the Third Test, with Graham Thorpe, Mark Lathwell, Martin McCague, and Mark Ilott coming in for their Test debuts, while Nasser Hussain also returned to the side, in place of Tufnell, Gatting, Lewis, Hick and Foster.

The home side won the toss and batted first, but failed to make the most of the opportunity to use what appeared to be a pretty flat pitch. Lathwell and Atherton struggled early on, and it was only when Robin Smith came to the crease that England started to look as though they might post a competitive score. His fluent 86, and a half-century from Hussain kept hopes alive, though at 276/6 at the end of the first day, coach Keith Fletcher was unhappy with the way the batsmen had got themselves out, criticising three "soft" dismissals in the top six. Hughes (5-92) and Warne (3-74) bowled well again, and wrapped up the innings early on day two.

Stumbling a little at 74/2, Australia's reply was boosted by a partnership of 123 between Boon and Mark Waugh, and the rate of scoring on the second afternoon was excellent, with 250 runs being added after lunch. England took five wickets in the day, McCague bowling with pace and menace, but Border (who dropped down the order to allow Julian to act as nightwatchman) and Warne added important runs on the third morning to give the visitors a first innings lead of 52.

England lost Atherton early, caught behind off Hughes, but Lathwell and Smith added 89 to erase the deficit. A collapse looked likely when Warne switched from the Radcliffe Road End, where he had looked fairly tame, to the Pavilion End where he immediately found turn and bounce and had both established batsmen out in quick succession, Smith caught behind and Lathwell adjudged lbw. Stewart followed shortly after, leaving England 117/4 and in real danger of throwing the match away. Caddick came in as nightwatchman and shepherded Gooch to the close, which proved a vital stage of the innings. Gooch came out the next morning in bullish mood and took the attack to the tourists, bludgeoning 120 and adding 150 with Graham Thorpe (114*), who went on to complete his maiden Test century on the fifth morning, adding a further 113 with Hussain before Gooch called for the declaration.

With 76 overs remaining in the match, and a target of 371 more-or-less out of the question, England were able to attack, and when Caddick ripped out Boon, Mark Waugh and Border to add to Such's dismissals of the openers, it looked as though an upset was on the cards, with Australia reeling on 115/6 at tea, but Steve Waugh (47* in three hours) and Brendan Julian (56* in just over two hours) provided stout resistance in the final session, and steered Australia to the safety of a draw.

- Thorpe was the first England batsman since Frank Hayes in 1973 to score a century on his debut. The draw broke England's dismal run of seven consecutive defeats in Test cricket.

=== Fourth Test (22–26 July) ===
22–26 July
Scorecard

Australia	v	England
653/4d (193 overs); AR Border 200* (399); MC Ilott 3/161 [51]		200 (82.5 overs); GA Gooch 59 (129); PR Reiffel 5/65 [26]
		305 (f/o) (127 overs); AJ Stewart 78 (125); TBA May 4/65 [27]

Australia won by an innings and 148 runs
Headingley Cricket Ground, Leeds
Umpires: HD Bird (Eng) and NT Plews (Eng)
Player of the match: AR Border (Aus)

- Australia won the toss and elected to bat.
- MP Bicknell (Eng) made his Test debut.

For England, on the back of their improved performance at Trent Bridge, the only change was tactical: Martin Bicknell came in to make his debut as a fourth seamer at the expense of the unlucky Such, England's leading wicket taker in the series. Australia also made one change, again dropping Julian, this time in favour of Paul Reiffel, and retained two front-line spinners (May and Warne).

Australia won the toss and continued their habit of racking up the first innings runs. Slater and Taylor added 86, and Boon and Mark Waugh, and then Boon and Border each compiled century stands. With the fall of Boon, the onslaught really started though: Border and Steve Waugh latched onto anything loose from the tired England bowlers, especially square of the wicket on both sides, and scored 45 boundaries between them in an unbroken stand of 332, which only ended when the captain reached his double century and declared, leaving Waugh unbeaten on 157. Ilott and Bicknell, the only bowlers to take wickets, bowled fifty overs each, and England sorely missed a spinner to bowl some of those overs and provide some variation. Even Graham Thorpe's unthreatening dibbly-dobblies were called upon to rest the main seamers.

England's reply got off to a disastrous start, with Lathwell caught behind off Hughes in the first over, and Smith and Stewart following soon after, leaving the hosts reeling on 50/3. Atherton (55) and Gooch (59) worked hard to restore some pride to the scoreboard with a century partnership, before Atherton's dismissal by Reiffel saw the collapse begin. From 158/3, none of the middle and lower order managed to stick around, and Hughes (3-47) and Reiffel (5-65) cleaned up.

The second innings began a little better: following-on for the second time in the series, the top order worked harder, and built some reasonable partnerships. Atherton made 63 before succumbing to the wiles of May and dragging himself too far from safety, offering a stumping chance of the type that Healy rarely missed. Stewart top-scored with 78, and all the specialist batsmen made starts. None, however, could convert that into the really big score that England needed from them to have a chance of saving the match. Hussain was left stranded with the tail, but neither he nor the bowlers could make any impression, and they got seriously bogged down. Hussain's 18 not out took nearly two hours to compile, and the 16 that he and Caddick added together for the seventh wicket almost an hour.

In the end Hughes (3-79) and May (4-65) polished off the tail to add to Reiffel's earlier good work, and Warne was luckless in forty tidy overs that cost just 63 runs.

=== Fifth Test (5–9 August) ===
5–9 August
Scorecard

England	v	Australia
276 (101.5 overs); MA Atherton 72 (157); PR Reiffel 6/71 [22.5]		408 (149.5 overs); ME Waugh 137 (219); PM Such 3/90 [52.5]
251 (133.2 overs); GP Thorpe 60 (192); SK Warne 5/82 [49]		120/2 (43.3 overs); ME Waugh 62* (87); JE Emburey 1/31 [18]

Australia won by 8 wickets
Edgbaston Cricket Ground, Birmingham
Umpires: JH Hampshire (Eng) and DR Shepherd (Eng)
Player of the match: ME Waugh (Aus)

- England won the toss and elected to bat.

Graham Gooch resigned the England captaincy after the Fourth Test, with the series decisively lost; new skipper Atherton won the toss and elected to bat. Having played no spinners in the previous Test and being found out, England picked two this time: Such and John Emburey, who replaced seamers McCague and Caddick. Lathwell was also dropped and Matthew Maynard came into the middle order, with Gooch resuming his place as an opener despite his success lower down. This seemed a particularly ill-judged decision when the Essex man lasted only 20 balls before edging Reiffel to slip. Maynard made a duck on his return to the side, leaving England at 76/3, but Atherton and Stewart consolidated, doubling the score before Stewart mistimed a stroke and dollied up a return catch to bowler Warne. Bicknell and Thorpe both provided Emburey (55*) with partners to resist the attack, but Reiffel wrapped up the tail once they had gone, finishing with six well-earned wickets.

At 80/4, Australia's reply was looking rather shaky, and England thought they had a fifth wicket but the appeal for a catch by Hussain at slip with Mark Waugh on 0 was turned down by David Shepherd. This proved to be a turning point, as Waugh stroked an elegant century, as with brother Steve (59) he added 153, and added a further century with 'keeper Ian Healy (80 from 107 balls) for the seventh wicket. Such was once again the pick of the England bowlers, achieving control (52 overs for just 90 runs) as well as three wickets.

England's second innings started well, with Gooch (48) providing the glue, but a flurry of wickets saw England slip from 104/1 to 125/6 in quick order on the fourth afternoon. Thorpe (60) and Emburey (37) added a century stand that gave the score some respectability, but by that time the hosts were in no position to save the match, and were dismissed shortly before the end of the day, leaving Australia a target of 120. Doubts set in at the start of the visitors' run chase when both Taylor and Slater were caught by Thorpe with the score on 12, but Mark Waugh (62*) and Boon (38*) saw them safely to their target with few further alarms.

=== Sixth Test (19–23 August) ===
19–23 August
Scorecard

England	v	Australia
380 (101.5 overs); GA Hick 80 (107); MG Hughes 3/121 [30]		303 (94.4 overs); IA Healy 83 (117); ARC Fraser 5/87 [26.4]
313 (119.2 overs); GA Gooch 79 (183); PR Reiffel 3/55 [24]		229 (81.1 overs); ME Waugh 49 (75); SL Watkin 4/65 [25]

England won by 161 runs
The Oval, London
Umpires: MJ Kitchen (Eng) and BJ Meyer (Eng)
Player of the match: ARC Fraser (Eng)

- England won the toss and elected to bat.

Again England made multiple changes to the side from the previous Test. This time, Smith, Emburey, Bicknell and Illot felt the chop from the selectors' axe, while Graham Thorpe had to be left out after a delivery from a 17-year-old net bowler broke his thumb, leading to coach Fletcher reporting the nets at The Oval as sub-standard. In their places came the pace trio of Devon Malcolm, Angus Fraser and Steve Watkin, all making their first appearances of the series, and batsmen Graeme Hick and Mark Ramprakash. Australia were unchanged again, as expected.

England won the toss and batted, and initially made the most of an excellent batting surface. Gooch, Atherton and Hick (80) all made good starts and got half-centuries, but were unable to capitalise and make a really big score, and late in the day Stewart (76) and Fraser enjoyed a good partnership of 62. England's score was 353/7 at the end of the first day. The most disappointing aspect of England's batting was that all seven specialist batsmen were out by now and, although there were runs on the board, most commentators felt a first innings score of around 500 would be necessary to put any pressure on the Australians. As it was, Reiffel (2-88) and Hughes (3–121) knocked the tail over the next morning and Australia were batting and looking to make inroads into the total. They were halted in their tracks by a destructive spell of fast bowling from Malcolm though, who took the first two wickets and, with Fraser, left the visitors struggling at 53/3. Taylor and Border, and then later Healy with a pugnacious 83, added some respectability to the total, but 303 was well below the score that the Australians expected. Fraser picked up his fifth Test five-for, while Malcolm bowled with great pace and less of his usual waywardness, and Watkin and Such supported well.

With a lead of 77, England pressed on in the second innings, Gooch (79), Atherton (42) and Hick (36) making starts before the wobbles set in. From 180/2, the hosts suddenly found themselves 186/5, and only a solid three-hour 64 from Ramprakash with initial support from Stewart steered the total above 300. After claiming overnight that they would not be batting for the draw, Australia's main worry soon became avoiding defeat once they slipped to 30/3: Watkin (4-65) ripped out the top order. Border and the Waughs added a little steel, but an inspired Malcolm came on after lunch and had Border caught behind and Mark Waugh (49) caught by Ramprakash, before trapping Steve Waugh in front, leaving Australia 106/6. Reiffel (42) and Warne (37) mustered some late-innings hitting, but it was all in vain, and England finally pulled off a victory in this series when Fraser had Warne adjudged lbw. This Test match holds the record for the highest aggregate (1225) without a century partnership - there were 12 half-century partnerships.

== ODI series ==
=== First ODI (19 May) ===
19 May
Scorecard

Australia; 258/9 (55 overs)	v	England; 254 (54.5 overs)
MA Taylor 79 (126); RK Illingworth 3/48 [11]		GA Hick 85 (102); CJ McDermott 3/38 [11]

Australia won by 4 runs
Old Trafford, Manchester
Umpires: BJ Meyer (Eng) and DR Shepherd (Eng)
Player of the match: CJ McDermott (Aus)

- England won the toss and elected to field.
- ML Hayden (Aus), AR Caddick and GP Thorpe (both Eng) made their ODI debuts.

=== Second ODI (21 May) ===
21 May
Scorecard

England; 277/5 (55 overs)	v	Australia; 280/4 (53.3 overs)
RA Smith 167* (163); CJ McDermott 3/29 [11]		ME Waugh 113 (122); CC Lewis 2/61 [10.3]

Australia won by 6 wickets
Edgbaston, Birmingham
Umpires: MJ Kitchen (Eng) and KE Palmer (Eng)
Player of the match: RA Smith (Eng)

- Australia won the toss and elected to field.
- Robin Smith's 167* was the highest ODI score by an English player at the time.

=== Third ODI (23 May) ===
23 May
Scorecard

Australia; 230/5 (55 overs)	v	England; 211 (53.1 overs)
DC Boon 73 (125); AR Caddick 3/39 [11]		AJ Stewart 74 (119); BP Julian 3/50 [11]

Australia won by 19 runs
Lord's, London
Umpires: HD Bird (Eng) and R Palmer (Eng)
Player of the match: BP Julian (Aus)

- England won the toss and elected to field.
- BP Julian (Aus) made his ODI debut.

== Tour matches ==
=== England Amateur XI v Australians ===
30 April 1993
Scorecard

Australians; 292/3 (55 overs)	v	England Amateur XI; 198 (45.2 overs)
ML Hayden 151 (189); NP Hackett 2/74 [10]		SJ Dean 48 (42); WJ Holdsworth 3/28 [8]

Australians won by 94 runs
Brunton Memorial Ground, Radlett
Umpires: B Dudleston (Eng) and JH Hampshire (Eng)

=== Lavinia, Duchess of Norfolk's XI v Australians ===
2 May 1993

Australians; 203/9 (50 overs)	v	Lavinia, Duchess of Norfolk's XI; 196 (49.5 overs)
SR Waugh 59; DW Headley 5/51 [10]		PWG Parker 77; ME Waugh 5/32 [10]

Australians won by 7 runs
Arundel Castle Cricket Ground, Arundel
Umpires: GI Burgess (Eng) and DJ Constant (Eng)

=== Middlesex v Australians ===
3 May 1993
Scorecard

Australians; 243/5 (55 overs)	v	Middlesex; 174 (48.1 overs)
ML Hayden 122 (157); ARC Fraser 2/76 [11]		MA Roseberry 47 (117); Damien Martyn 3/41 [11]

Australians won by 69 runs
Lord's, London
Umpires: VA Holder (WI) and RA White (Eng)

=== Worcestershire v Australians ===
5–7 May
Scorecard

Australians	v	Worcestershire
262 (86.5 overs); DC Boon 108 (201); PJ Newport 3/59 [22.5]		90 (33.5 overs); WPC Weston 17 (74); WJ Holdsworth 3/15 [7.5]
287/5 (54.5 overs); DC Boon 106 (101); RK Illingworth 2/70 [12.5]		458/4d (f/o) (108.1 overs); GA Hick 187 (220); WJ Holdsworth 2/96 [23]

Australians won by 5 wickets
New Road, Worcester
Umpires: BJ Meyer (Eng) and R Palmer (Eng)

- Australians won the toss and elected to bat.

=== Somerset v Australians ===
8–10 May
Scorecard

Australians	v	Somerset
431 (90.4 overs); MJ Slater 122 (149); AP van Troost 4/89 [18]		151/4d (47 overs); CJ Tavaré 62 (120); CJ McDermott 2/36 [10]
40/0d (11.3 overs); MA Taylor 18 (42); JID Kerr 0/8 (0.3)		285 (77.3 overs); AN Hayhurst 89 (192); TBA May 4/75 [23.3]

Australians won by 35 runs
County Ground, Taunton
Umpires: DR Shepherd (Eng) and KE Palmer (Eng)

- Australians won the toss and elected to bat.

== External sources ==
CricketArchive
