= English cricket team in Australia in 1994–95 =

International cricket tour

1994 Ashes series
- Date: 25 October 1994 – 7 February 1995
- Result: Australia won the five-Test series 3–1
- Player of the series: Craig McDermott
Teams
- England: Australia
Captains
- Michael Atherton: Mark Taylor
Most runs
- Graham Thorpe (444): Michael Slater (623)
Most wickets
- Darren Gough (20): Craig McDermott (32)

The England cricket team toured Australia in 1994–95 to compete in the Ashes series against their hosts. The series consisted of five Test matches, Australia winning three, England one, and the other match was drawn. Australia retained the Ashes a third consecutive time.

== Overview ==
The experienced Mike Gatting was added to the England squads that had toured the West Indies and enjoyed success in home series against New Zealand and South Africa. Joey Benjamin and Martin McCague were recalled to the bowling after successful county seasons, although the omission of Angus Fraser surprised some, and when McCague was later incapacitated by injury and Fraser sent out as a replacement, he was preferred to Benjamin in the test side, as also was a later replacement Chris Lewis. Mike Atherton again captained the team, rallying after the summer indiscretions at Lord's though it appeared he was less than happy at the selections that had been made.

The tourists' problems began almost immediately on arriving in Australia, as opening batsman Alec Stewart fractured a finger in a practice match and Shaun Udal broke his thumb in the official tour opener at Lilac Hill. This was followed by Devon Malcolm and Benjamin succumbing to chickenpox prior to the First Test. Malcolm's absence was a huge blow to England, whose coach Keith Fletcher had built up as a focal point of the pace attack, comparing the England seamers to the legendary Lillee and Thomson and claiming that the Australians were scared of his pace, while describing Darren Gough as "Yorkshire's fastest since Freddie Trueman". Lillie and former Aussie skipper Greg Chappell poured scorn on such claims. Meanwhile, both David Hopps of The Guardian and Simon O'Hagan in The Independent identified Graham Thorpe as England's key batsman, and the most likely to counter the leg-spin of Shane Warne.

As England arrived for the series, the Australian side were still in the midst of their tour of Pakistan, their first under new captain Mark Taylor, where they lost a close series 1–0 with batsmen taking most of the plaudits. Michael Bevan, Michael Slater, Mark Waugh and Steve Waugh had provided most of the Australian runs, while Warne was the principal bowling threat, picking up 18 wickets in the series. Injuries to Steve Waugh and wicketkeeper Ian Healy stymied their approach somewhat, but they were unlucky to lose the series which effectively turned in Pakistan's favour with a last wicket partnership of 57 between Inzamam ul-Haq and Mushtaq Ahmed that sealed victory for the hosts in the First Test, The Australians identified Warne as the prime challenge for the visitors, with Australia's seamers on the decline.

England were also involved in a One Day International tournament with Zimbabwe, Australia and an Australia 'A' side, which was won by Australia.

== Squads ==
England	Australia
Mike Atherton (c); Steve Rhodes (wk); Joey Benjamin; John Crawley; Phillip DeFreitas; Neil Fairbrother; Angus Fraser; Mike Gatting; Graham Gooch; Darren Gough; Graeme Hick; Chris Lewis; Devon Malcolm; Martin McCague; Mark Ramprakash; Alec Stewart; Graham Thorpe; Phil Tufnell; Shaun Udal; Craig White	Mark Taylor (c); Ian Healy (wk); Jo Angel; Michael Bevan; Greg Blewett; David Boon; Damien Fleming; Tim May; Craig McDermott; Glenn McGrath; Peter McIntyre; Michael Slater; Shane Warne; Mark Waugh; Steve Waugh

== Test series ==
=== First Test ===
25–29 November
Scorecard

Australia	v	England
426 (120.2 overs); MJ Slater 176 (244); D Gough 4/107 [32]		167 (67.2 overs); MA Atherton 54 (168); CJ McDermott 6/53 [19]
8/248d (88 overs); MA Taylor 58 (102); PCR Tufnell 4/79 [38]		323 (137.2 overs); GA Hick 80 (227); SK Warne 8/71 [50.2]

Australia won by 184 runs
The Gabba, Brisbane
Umpires: CJ Mitchley (SA) and SG Randell (Aus)
Player of the match: SK Warne (Aus)

- Australia won the toss and elected to bat.

The build-up to the First Test was chaotic from the England perspective. The first choice bowling attack was compromised when Devon Malcolm was struck down by chickenpox, which team manager Mike Smith described as "a major loss to the side". Malcolm was replaced by left arm spinner Phil Tufnell, while Angus Fraser was called up to the tour as cover from his club cricket in Sydney. Mike Gatting was preferred over John Crawley for the final batting spot, despite his indifferent form in the early part of the tour and questions over whether he was actually part of captain Mike Atherton's plans. Indeed, the skipper and tour managers had already come under some criticism from Chairman of Selectors Ray Illingworth back in London, which did not help team morale.

By contrast, the hosts were able to pick from a full strength squad, with Ian Healy recovered from his broken finger. Curator Keith Mitchell promised that the pitch would be conducive to spin, and Australia included both Shane Warne and Tim May to take advantage of the conditions at the expense of seamer Damien Fleming. Coach Bobby Simpson described the pitch as "a great batting strip", and Atherton called it "a belter".

On the first morning, openers Michael Slater and captain Mark Taylor made the most of winning the toss, advancing to 0/87 at lunch untroubled by the England bowlers, with Taylor making a fluent half-century. A mix-up saw both batsmen at one end soon after lunch, and Taylor departed run out for 59. David Boon followed soon after, when he played on to Darren Gough, but this only brought Mark Waugh to the crease, and he and Slater saw through most of the rest of the day at a run a ball, Slater moving to a century (173 balls). His 150 came in just another 51 deliveries, before eventually being dismissed by the part-time seam of Graham Gooch, lifting him to Gatting at mid-off for 176 (25 fours). Michael Bevan was Gough's third wicket of the day shortly before the close, but Waugh and nightwatchman Warne saw the home side safely through to 4/329 at the end of the day.

On the second morning, Waugh proceeded to his century (his third against England) off 166 deliveries, and he was the ninth man out for 140 caught by Alec Stewart at short cover off Gough. In their reply, England struggled against the imposing Craig McDermott, who was motivated by press speculation about his form, insisting that "it was a shock to me...I don't know where it's come from or what it's about, but I have to silence it." He picked up the early wickets of Stewart and Graeme Hick and returning later in the day to trap Gatting in front. At the other end, Atherton batted well before he became a fifth victim of McDermott (6/53), edging an attempted hook to Healy for 54 early on the third morning, and the tourists subsided to a total of 167.

Taylor opted not to enforce the follow-on, and he and Slater put on 109 in even time before Gough made the breakthrough, followed by two strikes from Tufnell, removing Boon, as the England bowlers fought back. Phillip DeFreitas also chipped in with a couple of wickets, but Healy (45 not out) helped the Australians set a target of 508 for England to chase. Warne struck either side of lunch to dismiss Stewart and Atherton, but Hick (80) and Graham Thorpe (67) gave the England fans some hope, adding 152 in four hours together before the close, playing Warne and May with relative ease.

Half an hour into the final day, Warne finally turned the tide back in favour of the Australians and effectively sealed the victory. Thorpe pushed forward to a fuller delivery and missed it, then Hick was caught off the back of his bat after the ball ricocheted off his arm. Gooch added 30 with Gatting and another 30 with wicketkeeper Steve Rhodes, but both managed to nick the new ball to Healy off McDermott's bowling. Warne cleaned up the tail to finish with match figures of 11/108 and pick up the man-of-the-match award, and the game was over before tea on the final day, England mustering 323.

At the post-match press conference, losing captain Atherton said that "It's a devastating defeat for me. I stressed before the Test the importance of not losing the first game... It can set the tone for the series", but emphasised his team's stomach for a fight, noting their recovery in the West Indies, saying: "...we came back towards the end of the tour and won in Bridgetown. I hope we come back quicker this time."

=== Second Test ===
24–29 December
Scorecard

Australia	v	England
279 (107.3 overs); SR Waugh 94* (191); D Gough 4/60 [26]		212 (83.4 overs); GP Thorpe 51 (116); SK Warne 6/64 [27.4]
7/320d (124 overs); DC Boon 131 (277); D Gough 3/59 [25]		92 (42.5 overs); MA Atherton 25 (43); CJ McDermott 5/42 [16.5]

Australia won by 295 runs
Melbourne Cricket Ground, Melbourne
Umpires: SA Bucknor (WI) and SG Randell (Aus)
Player of the match: CJ McDermott (Aus)

- England won the toss and elected to field.

Between the first two Tests, England lost two of their three World Series Cup matches, and two fifty over matches against the Australian Cricket Academy, but won a four-day match against Queensland with Gatting scoring a double-hundred to secure his Test place. The break also saw Dennis Lillee commenting critically about the state of the pitches, concerned that they were deliberately being produced to favour spin.

Australia made one change to their Brisbane line-up, bringing Fleming in for Glenn McGrath, while England's only change saw the recovered Devon Malcolm replacing Martin McCague. Atherton won the toss and elected to field, but despite picking up the wickets of Slater (run out) and Taylor, the England bowlers generally bowled far too short and wide, and did not make best use of the damp conditions. Boon and Mark Waugh added 52 before Tufnell struck, and Bevan followed soon after, popping a Gough delivery up to the skipper at gully to leave the hosts 4/100. The Waughs added another 71, but Mark (71) was picked up by DeFreitas, and Healy and Warne were dismissed quickly by Tufnell and Gough (4/60) respectively to leave the Australians 7/220 by the close.

Steve Waugh (94 not out) continued his good work the next morning, adding another 59 with the tail, but were a little disappointed not to post a bigger total. The England innings got off to an inauspicious start with Stewart forced to retired hurt after he received a blow to the hand from McDermott. Atherton (44) was again the early linchpin, adding 30 with Hick and another 79 with Thorpe (51), before the former was given out caught behind decision by Steve Randell, Atherton was adjudged leg before to Warne, and Thorpe was given out caught at silly point off the same bowler. England collapsed from 1/119 to 6/151 in short order, and then from 6/185 to 212 all out, with McDermott (3/72) and Warne (6/64) the main wicket-takers.

The second innings saw a solid start from the Australian openers, followed up by Mark Waugh, but the main thrust of the innings came from Boon, who added 112 with Bevan on the third morning in his total of 131 that spanned over six hours. Once these two were parted, the run rate dropped, and Taylor declared the innings on 7/320, leaving England 388 to win in four sessions of play. McDermott picked up his 250th Test wicket when Thorpe became the third England wicket to fall in the first of those sessions, having already seen Fleming dispose of Gooch and Hick, and Atherton also fell before the close on the fourth day.

The final day saw little resistance from England. McDermott had Gatting and Rhodes both caught in the slips before Warne, utilised from the start of the day, became the third Australian to take an Ashes hat-trick, removing DeFreitas (lbw), Gough (caught behind) and Malcolm (caught at short leg). McDermott completed had Tufnell edged to give Healy his fifth catch of the innings, leaving the tourists all out for 92 in less than two sessions.

Warne played down his achievement, commenting that "I was just trying to tie up an end and I got a bit lucky", while his skipper noted that "Shane is like the West Indian bowlers – when he gets on top he gets all over you". Atherton was unhappy at the post-match press conference. "I don't like to see us lie down and die," he said, referring to his decision to have Alec Stewart bat in the second innings despite a broken finger, but he admitted that "we got walloped in the first two Tests... We've got some good players [but] we're not playing especially well at the moment." The Sydney Morning Herald was less charitable towards England's performances to date, with Patrick Smith claiming that "Wisden should count England wickets as just a half", and deploring Atherton's lack of aggression in the field. He also derided Gooch, Gatting and Hick, and picked out the way that the visitors' batsmen got themselves out so readily.

=== Third Test ===
1–5 January 1995
Scorecard

England	v	Australia
309 (119.2 overs); MA Atherton 88 (267); CJ McDermott 5/101 [30]		116 (42.5 overs); MA Taylor 49 (131); D Gough 6/49 [18.5]
2/255d (72 overs); GA Hick 98* (166); DW Fleming 2/66 [20]		7/344 (121.4 overs); MA Taylor 113 (248); ARC Fraser 5/73 [25]

Match drawn
Sydney Cricket Ground, Sydney
Umpires: SA Bucknor (WI) and DB Hair (Aus)
Player of the match: D Gough (Eng)

- England won the toss and elected to bat.

After his performance in the first two Tests, Shane Warne's future was the subject of considerable speculation in the media. A Reuters report suggested that he was troubled by chronic shoulder troubles, but that if he could overcome them he would be the mainstay of Australia's bowling attack for a long time. The England skipper added to the Australian eulogies, describing Warne as "easily the best bowler on either side", though Pakistan's Saleem Malik was less effusive, noting that "I didn't have any trouble picking out his variations".

For the Third Test, the home side were unchanged, while England replaced the injured Stewart with John Crawley and Gooch moved back to the top of the order. On the bowling front, DeFreitas was dropped again, making way for replacement Angus Fraser. England won the toss and elected to bat, and McDermott and Fleming once again made early inroads into the top order, reducing England to 3/20 in the first hour. Stubborn resistance from Atherton (88) and Crawley (72) added 174 for the fourth wicket. Four wickets fell at the end of the first day, however, leaving the tourists at 7/198 and with two new batsmen at the crease to ward off the new ball. during the next day's morning session, however, Gough scored up a quick half-century, and Malcolm hit 29 from 18 balls while Fraser battled made a dogged 27 and ended up being last man dismissed as the visitors batted into the afternoon session. McDermott's 5/101 from his 30 overs were bowled between visits to the dressing room to alleviate a bout of gastroenteritis.

Australia's reply struggled. Initially curtailed on the second afternoon when rain brought an end to proceedings, the top order fell to Gough and Malcolm, slipping to 5/39 with only Taylor (49) holding out. Bevan and Healy both fell to Fraser and Gough returned to mop up the tail, and picked up Taylor and Fleming in consecutive deliveries to end the innings and return figures of 6/49. The hosts' 116 was just sufficient to avoid the follow-on, and for the Australian bowlers found England tough to dismiss. Atherton's second half-century of the match (67) added 104 with Hick, and Thorpe helped add a further 97, but controversy arose when the England skipper called for the declaration on 2/255 with Hick stuck on 98. Keith Fletcher defended the captain's decision, insisting that the Worcestershire batsman was well aware that a declaration was imminent and he had been given the word: "Graeme was told the declaration was coming very soon," Fletcher told the press conference that evening. "He knew. The game has to come before the individual. The context of the match must come first." Hick himself, who would never go on to make an Ashes century, had no comment to make on the matter.

Australia were left to chase 449 for the victory and made a strong start, reaching 139 by the close of the fourth day without losing a wicket, and went on to 208 before Fraser had Slater (103, 10 fours) caught by Tufnell. An hour later, after a rain-lengthened lunch break, Malcolm uprooted Taylor's off stump for 113 and the intent to chase was quelled. Boon batted for an hour and three-quarters for 17, but after his dismissal Fraser (5–73) made the most of the damp conditions, delivering a series of seaming deliveries to the Australian middle order that saw Bevan, both Waugh brothers and Healy returned to the pavilion, Rhodes taking three catches. The fading light saw Hick, Tufnell and Gooch bowling at this critical time instead of Gough and Malcolm, with Warne and May batting out the last hour to save the draw, Malcolm spilled a catch from Warne off what appeared to be the final delivery of the match and the players walked off thinking the game was over, only to realise by the time they got to the pitch edge that there was still time for one more over.

Atherton commented in resigned fashion that "the umpires should know the rules" but admitted that "we would not have won the game". He also called for the introduction of instant replay, after a run out situation earlier in the innings had gone against the tourists, "the technology should be used," he said. "It's a fail-safe method". The England skipper also praised Gough's Man-of-the-match performance. Meanwhile, Taylor was relieved to escape with a draw and retain the Ashes. "After being bowled out for 116, it's a relief to draw the Test. It'll probably turn to jubilation in an hour's time."

=== Fourth Test ===
26–30 January
Scorecard

England	v	Australia
353 (141.3 overs); MW Gatting 117 (286); CJ McDermott 3/66 [41]		419 (121.5 overs); GS Blewett 102* (180); DE Malcolm 3/78 [26]
328 (94.5 overs); PAJ DeFreitas 88 (95); ME Waugh 5/40 [14]		156 (61.1 overs); IA Healy 51* (136); CC Lewis 4/24 [13]

England won by 106 runs
Adelaide Oval, Adelaide
Umpires: PD Parker (Aus) and S Venkataraghavan (Ind)
Player of the match: PAJ DeFreitas (Eng)

- England won the toss and elected to bat.
- GS Blewett and PE McIntyre (both Aus) made their Test debuts.

Amidst the failure to qualify for the final of the One-day series and a drawn match with Victoria that saw Hick continue his good form with a century but little other joy, the Daily Mirror latched onto Gooch's poor form and suggested that he might miss out on the final two Tests and end his career in anti-climax while John Woodcock criticised the declaration at Sydney that denied Hick his century and the growing friction between the Captain and Chairman of Selectors.

As it turned out, England were forced into two changes but Gooch retained his place: Gough was already back in England and was replaced by DeFreitas, while Hick failed to recover from a back spasm that plagued him during his innings against the Victorians and Chris Lewis, playing club cricket in the area, came in for him. This left England to go into the match with an apparently uncomfortably long tail, wicketkeeper Steve Rhodes, in poor form with the bat, batting as high as no.6. The hosts also made two changes, with leg-spinner Peter McIntyre replacing May, who had been unsuccessful in the first three tests but was also recovering from a hamstring pull suffered in the One-dayers and Greg Blewett also making his Test debut in place of Michael Bevan.

The tourists won the toss and made the most of good batting conditions. A rain-shortened first day saw England reach 2/196, with the skipper making 80, Gooch 47, and Gatting 50 not out by the close. Fleming picked up the two wickets to fall with but strained a hamstring early on the second day and left McDermott to take over the seam bowling duties. Gatting went on to make 117 (14 fours), but after a 75-run stand with Crawley England collapsed from 286–3 to 353 all out with McDermott and the spinners running through the middle and lower order. In reply, Slater and Taylor made their third century opening stand of the series, and although their work was partly undone by the efforts of Lewis and DeFreitas on day three, Blewett and Healy (74) appeared to take the game away from the visitors with a stand of 164. Blewett proceeded to his century the next morning (102 not out, 12 fours), but once Healy was caught behind off Malcolm the tail collapsed and the first innings lead was restricted to 66 runs.

Australia's attack was weakened further with McDermott struggling through stomach cramps, but with Mark Waugh taking command of the situation and bowling, England struggled. Thorpe (83) and Crawley (71) added 71 for the fourth wicket, but it was Crawley's partnership with DeFreitas that ensured a close finish. DeFreitas's 88 from 95 balls (9 fours, 2 sixes), a Test-career best that included 22 off one McDermott over, helped set the Australians a target of 263 for victory in 67 overs.

After safely making it to the lunch interval, the home side slipped to 4/23 in five overs, Malcolm bowling aggressively in a spell of 3/13. Mark Waugh and Blewett contrived to hold out for another hour, before Lewis (4/24) and Tufnell took further wickets. Healy (51 not out) did his best to marshal the tail, batting for two and a quarter hours and with Fleming, batting until well into the final hour, but Lewis eventually trapped the latter leg-before, and Malcolm (4/39) finished the job off by picking up McIntyre as well to round off an England victory.

Post-match, Atherton was effusive about man-of-the-match DeFreitas: "Daffy grabbed the game by the scruff of the neck", the England captain acknowledged. The man himself was pleased but less excited. "They bowled it short, I saw it and hit it. That's about it, really," he simplified. Aussie skipper Mark Taylor admitted that "[t]hey've played better than us since Christmas" and acknowledged his concern about their form, especially that of his key spin weapon. "Warney is feeling a bit flat. He knows he's not bowling that well."

This Test is also often cited as the catalyst for the formal establishment of the Barmy Army. On the first day of the Test, a group of English supporters headed to 'T-Shirt City' on Hindley Street and ordered first 50 and then 100 shirts saying "Atherton's Barmy Army" with the Union Jack emblazoned on the back. Over 200 shirts were purchased by the end of the Test, and 3,000 were purchased by the end of the tour.

=== Fifth Test ===
3–7 February
Scorecard

Australia	v	England
402 (135.5 overs); MJ Slater 124 (231); CC Lewis 3/73 [31.5]		295 (96.3 overs); GP Thorpe 123 (218); J Angel 3/65 [22.3]
8/345d (90.3 overs); GS Blewett 115 (158); CC Lewis 2/71 [16]		123 (41 overs); MR Ramprakash 42 (57); CJ McDermott 6/38 [15]

Australia won by 329 runs
WACA Ground, Perth
Umpires: KE Liebenberg (SA) and SG Randell (Aus)
Player of the match: SR Waugh (Aus)

- Australia won the toss and elected to bat.

Despite their success fielding five specialist bowlers at Adelaide, England brought in Mark Ramprakash from the England A tour of India to replace spinner Tufnell. The biggest concern in Atherton's mind was the aggressiveness of his fast bowlers – Devon Malcolm had been warned by the Match Referee to tone it down after directing Mark Waugh towards the pavilion in the Sydney Test – and the skipper was keen to see that it didn't stifle their effectiveness. Australia's selection was less straightforward, with some analysts predicting that Warne had either been overbowled or had an injury that was affecting his performance and would be left out of the side. Skipper Mark Taylor rubbished these reports though, claiming that his leg spinner simply "had a niggle", and "wasn't bowling well", but that it had "nothing to do with injuries" and that it was "all to do with his action", which was now remedied.

In the end, Australia made two changes to the bowling attack, neither of which involved Warne: Jo Angel came in for what would be his fourth and final Test appearance, and Glenn McGrath was recalled after missing the last three matches. The players to miss out were Fleming and McIntyre, leaving the Australians with a four-man attack completed by Warne and McDermott.

Taylor won the toss and elected to bat on a typically hard and dry WACA surface. Slater played and missed at Malcolm early in his innings, but went on to make the most of being dropped three times by England fielders. Although Taylor and Boon departed in the first session, Slater and Mark Waugh (88) added 183 for the third wicket. Slater's 124, his third of the series, set up a dominant position for the hosts. "I had my luck, but it was not my fault they were dropping the catches" he remarked on the first evening. Steve Waugh was the other main contributor to Australia's total of 402, but was left stranded on 99 not out after a mix up with brother Mark, running for McDermott who was feeling a back strain.

In reply, England found themselves losing quick wickets. Atherton and Gatting both went in the opening overs to McGrath, but Thorpe and Gooch (37) added 72 before the latter and Crawley departed in quick succession to Mark Waugh. Ramprakash helped see England safely through to the close, but after a knock of 72 was the third of four very quick wickets in the afternoon session that saw the tourists slump to 295 all out despite Thorpe's 123 (218 balls, 19 fours).

During Australia's second innings, Slater hit 45 from 55 deliveries before departing to Fraser and Angel, nightwatchman on the third evening, was run out by his captain, England reducing the Australians to 5/123. Blewett and Steve Waugh then hit a partnership of 203 at almost a run a minute. Blewett's 115 (158 balls, 19 fours) pleased the batsman who argued that "I enjoyed this more [than my first Test century]... I'm rapt because we were in a bit of trouble when I came in." England's catchers dropped a total of eleven chances in the match, and by the time that Taylor declared at 8/345, England were left with 104 overs to score 453.

McDermott and McGrath drove ripped through the upper order in their opening spells to leave the visitors 6/27. Ramprakash and Rhodes scored a partnership of 68 for the seventh wicket, the former seduced into a lazy cut to gully by Mark Waugh's change of pace, ending the resistance as England stumbled to 123 all out, McDermott raising his series tally to 32 wickets.

Atherton conceded after the match that the Australians had been the better team, and accepted blame for the series defeat, noting that "...a captain stands and falls by results...I have not captained as well as I did in the West Indies." Meanwhile, his counterpart in the Australian side enthused about the back-up bowlers supporting Warne and McDermott, noting that "I was very happy with McGrath's good pace and line. He'll trouble [the West Indian] players."

== Series summary ==
=== England ===
The 3–1 result was a fair reflection of an Ashes series that was dominated by the Australians. Thorpe and Atherton led the way for England's batsmen, each scoring more than 400 runs in the series, but the rest of the top order struggled, with only Hick (in six innings) and Ramprakash (in two) also averaging over 40. Gooch and Gatting both retired from International cricket at the end of the tour, and it was generally felt by commentators that it was a tour too far for both of them, as they failed regularly with the bat (they scored one fifty and one century between them in 19 innings and averaged a combined 22.47) and contributed heavily towards England's malaise in the field.

Of the bowlers, Gough was the most successful, picking up 20 wickets at 21.25. Ironically the best support for Gough came from Lewis (11 wickets at 22.64) and Fraser (14 at 27.79), even though both had been overlooked in the initial selection. Other bowlers' figures were badly affected by the dropped catches. McCague hardly bowled after his failure in the first Test, and Joey Benjamin didn't figure at all.

The captain pressed the need to look at England's younger players for selection and acknowledged that the fielding had been a particular problem, but ultimately conceded that his team had been beaten by a better side. He wasn't backed by the selectors, however, with Fred Titmus arguing that "[a] youth policy should be the preserve of the England A team" and noting that "we would not have seen the best of Jack Hobbs, Tom Graveney and Jim Laker" if they had been rejected because of their age. Others backed Atherton though: In his later book, The Botham Report, Ian Botham criticised the failure to select Angus Fraser from the start, who Chairman of Selectors Ray Illingworth described "just wasn't the man for the job" and who "never looked up to it", noting that England's performances took a turn for the better once the Middlesex seamer was finally called up for the Third Test.; similarly, Devon Malcolm recalled in his autobiography that "Goochie and Gatt shouldn't have been picked for that tour; they had declined at the highest level" and that Atherton "gave the appearance of being fed up of being lumbered with a group of players who wouldn't have all been his preferred choices. Getting sniped at by Illingworth from afar didn't help either."

Australia's Rod Marsh blamed England coach Keith Fletcher for the poor performances and for a negative attitude towards the series, criticising the coach's press conference comments in Adelaide. "A team must always, always, play to win and even if you think that way you should never say it," he told radio listeners. "'The best we can do is an honourable draw' – what a load of codswallop. If anyone is wondering why England have had such a hard time in Australia, there lies the answer", but Fletcher refused to quit, citing a string of injuries and illnesses that had hampered the tour as the main cause of the team's lack of success and defending the inclusion of Gooch and Gatting, noting that "[h]indsight is a brilliant thing, but there was not one person who would have left Graham at home at the start of the tour."

=== Australia ===
By contrast, Australia were quietly happy with the series result, although in looking forward to their forthcoming tour of the West Indies, captain Mark Taylor was keen that his side got tougher. "We can't let a Test slip away as happened in Adelaide. Do that against the West Indies and we could not win," he insisted, noting that "[u]nlike England, they would not have dropped nine or ten chances in a Test."

Michael Slater topped the run charts for the home side, compiling three centuries and 623 runs in the series at an impressive 62.30. The captain and Mark Waugh also scored more than 400 runs and seven batsmen averaged more than 35. They were led by Greg Blewett, who Taylor described as "the find of the summer".

McDermott (32 wickets at 21.09) and Warne (27 at 20.33) shouldered the burden of the bowling, racking up 489 overs between them, and although the main support bowlers were less effective with only Fleming consistent enough to merit note, Mark Waugh also chipped in with eight wickets including a career best 5–40 in a losing cause at Adelaide, but Angel, McGrath, McIntyre and May were disappointing.

== See also ==
- John the bookmaker controversy
