= International cricket in 1988 =

International cricket season

The 1988 International cricket season was from May 1988 to September 1988.

== Season overview ==
International tours
| Start date | Home team | Away team | Results [Matches] | | | |
| Start date | Home team | Away team | Test | ODI | FC | LA |
|---|---|---|---|---|---|---|
| 19 May 1988 | England | West Indies | 0–4 [5] | 3–0 [3] | — | — |
| 25 August 1988 | England | Sri Lanka | 1–0 [1] | 1–0 [1] | — | — |

== May ==
=== West Indies in England ===
Texaco Trophy - ODI series
| No. | Date | Home captain | Away captain | Venue | Result |
|---|---|---|---|---|---|
| ODI 518 | 19 May | Mike Gatting | Vivian Richards | Edgbaston Cricket Ground, Birmingham | England by 6 wickets |
| ODI 519 | 21 May | Mike Gatting | Vivian Richards | Headingley Cricket Ground, Leeds | England by 47 runs |
| ODI 519 | 23–24 May | Mike Gatting | Vivian Richards | Lord's, London | England by 7 wickets |
Wisden Trophy - Test series
| No. | Date | Home captain | Away captain | Venue | Result |
| Test 1098 | 2–7 June | Mike Gatting | Vivian Richards | Trent Bridge, Nottingham | Match drawn |
| Test 1099 | 16–21 June | John Emburey | Vivian Richards | Lord's, London | West Indies by 134 runs |
| Test 1100 | 30 June-5 July | John Emburey | Vivian Richards | Old Trafford Cricket Ground, Manchester | West Indies by an innings and 156 runs |
| Test 1101 | 21–26 July | Chris Cowdrey | Vivian Richards | Headingley Cricket Ground, Leeds | West Indies by 10 wickets |
| Test 1102 | 4–8 August | Graham Gooch | Vivian Richards | Kennington Oval, London | West Indies by 8 wickets |

== August ==
=== Sri Lanka in England ===
One-off Test series
| No. | Date | Home captain | Away captain | Venue | Result |
|---|---|---|---|---|---|
| Test 1103 | 25–30 August | Graham Gooch | Ranjan Madugalle | Lord's, London | England by 7 wickets |
One-off Texaco Trophy ODI match
| No. | Date | Home captain | Away captain | Venue | Result |
| ODI 521 | 4 September | Graham Gooch | Ranjan Madugalle | Kennington Oval, London | England by 5 wickets |
