= International cricket in 1987 =

International cricket season

The 1987 International cricket season was from April 1987 to September 1987.

== Season overview ==
International tours
Start date	Home team	Away team	Results [Matches]			
Start date	Home team	Away team	Test	ODI	FC	LA
16 April 1987	Sri Lanka	New Zealand	0–0 [1]	—	—	—
21 May 1987	England	Pakistan	0–1 [5]	2–1 [3]	—	—

== April ==
=== New Zealand in Sri Lanka ===
Test series
No.	Date	Home captain	Away captain	Venue	Result
Test 1074	16–21 April	Duleep Mendis	Jeff Crowe	Colombo Cricket Club Ground, Colombo	Match drawn

== May ==
=== Pakistan in England ===
ODI series
No.	Date	Home captain	Away captain	Venue	Result
ODI 448	21 May	Mike Gatting	Imran Khan	Kennington Oval, London	England by 7 wickets
ODI 449	23 May	Mike Gatting	Imran Khan	Trent Bridge, Nottingham	Pakistan by 6 wickets
ODI 450	25 May	Mike Gatting	Imran Khan	Edgbaston Cricket Ground, Edgbaston	England by 1 wicket
Test series
No.	Date	Home captain	Away captain	Venue	Result
Test 1075	4–9 June	Mike Gatting	Imran Khan	Old Trafford, Manchester	Match drawn
Test 1076	18–23 June	Mike Gatting	Imran Khan	Lord's, London	Match drawn
Test 1077	2–6 July	Mike Gatting	Imran Khan	Headingley, Leeds	Pakistan by an innings and 18 runs
Test 1078	23–28 July	Mike Gatting	Imran Khan	Edgbaston, Birmingham	Match drawn
Test 1079	6–11 August	Mike Gatting	Imran Khan	Kennington Oval, London	Match drawn
