= Mark Lathwell =

English cricketer (born 1971)

Personal information
- Full name: Mark Nicholas Lathwell
- Born: 26 December 1971 (age 54); Bletchley, Buckinghamshire, England
- Nickname: Lathers, Rowdy, Trough
- Height: 5 ft 8 in (1.73 m)
- Batting: Right-handed
- Bowling: Right-arm medium
- Role: Top-order batsman

International information
- National side: England
- Test debut (cap 562): 1 July 1993 v Australia
- Last Test: 22 July 1993 v Australia

Domestic team information
- Years: Team
- 1990–2001: Somerset

Career statistics
Competition	Test	FC	LA
Matches	2	156	167
Runs scored	78	8,727	4,409
Batting average	19.50	33.43	28.26
100s/50s	0/0	12/57	5/26
Top score	33	206	121
Balls bowled	–	1,144	235
Wickets	–	13	1
Bowling average	–	55.46	193.00
5 wickets in innings	–	0	0
10 wickets in match	–	0	0
Best bowling	–	2/21	1/23
Catches/stumpings	–	105/–	47/–
- Source: CricketArchive, 6 August 2008

Mark Nicholas Lathwell (born 26 December 1971) is a former English cricketer who played in two Test matches in 1993. Lathwell played the entirety of his first-class cricket career for Somerset County Cricket Club.

== Early career and England U19 matches ==
Born in Bletchley, Milton Keynes, Lathwell attended Braunton Community College and began his career playing for the Somerset Second XI, aged 18, in 1990. He made his limited overs debut in a rain-affected match against Glamorgan Second XI in which he scored 18 not out and bowled seven overs for 25 runs. He then played in the corresponding three-day match, scoring 17 and 10 in a heavy defeat for Somerset.

Attention was drawn to Lathwell when he played against Sussex Second XI in June 1990. Opening the batting, he scored 168 not out and put on a partnership of 235 for the third wicket with Nick Pringle. Lathwell also took the only wicket in Sussex's (declared) first innings, and scored 37 in the second. He then scored 69 runs in the match against Leicestershire Second XI, before making his List A debut against the touring Sri Lankans, bowling seven overs.

At the start of the 1991 season, Lathwell played for the English U-19 cricket team against the Sussex side he overpowered the previous summer, although he was run out for just two runs. He scored eight half-centuries over the summer, before breaking into the Somerset First XI first in the 40-over competition, and then for the final first-class match of the season. For England Young Cricketers, Lathwell played in two Youth One Day Internationals (ODIs) and three Youth Test matches against Australia Young Cricketers, scoring 262 runs at an average of 32.75 and a top score of 66.

== First season for Somerset First XI ==
The 1992 season saw Lathwell in the Second XI, but he was beginning to break through into the First XI in one-day cricket. He opened the batting in two matches against the Netherlands (scoring 52 in the second). Lathwell top scored in the first Sunday League match of the season against Kent to set up a comfortable 4 wicket win. Two days later, Somerset played Kent again in the Benson & Hedges Cup, succumbing to a heavy defeat, Lathwell inexplicably batting at number 9. After another half-century for the Second XI, Lathwell was now firmly in the first team for the remainder of the season. It was an excellent debut season for Lathwell, scoring eleven half-centuries and one century (114 against Surrey) in first-class cricket. There was a lean spell in the middle of the season with consecutive scores of 1, 2, 3, 0 and 4, but Lathwell responded well with five innings between 45 and 72 and finished with a highly respectable average of 36.75 in first-class cricket. Lathwell was now established as an opening batsman, and was seldom used as a bowler, only taking wickets in for the season. He scored well in List A cricket too, but failed to convert any scores into centuries (his highest being 85, 93 and 95). Lathwell was rewarded with his Somerset County Cap, and was called into the England A touring squad to Australia. Lathwell was one of the successes of the England A tour, scoring 175 against Tasmania, and adding another hundred against New South Wales at the SCG against an attack that included a young Glenn McGrath.

== England career ==
In the summer of 1993, with England suffering a poor run of results and already 2–0 down in the Ashes, Lathwell was called up into the England side. Along with three other debutants (two of whom, Graham Thorpe and Mark Ilott, had also been on the England 'A' tour the previous winter), Lathwell made his England debut on 1 July 1993 against Australia in the Third Test at Trent Bridge. Ironically, by the time of his England selection Lathwell's form had undergone a decline, and he made only 4 and 0 in his last game for Somerset before his Test debut. However Lathwell scored 20 in the first innings of his first Test and 33 in the second, and, assisted by a century from Thorpe, England at least managed to draw the Test and end a run of seven successive Test defeats. After this fairly promising start, he was picked for a second successive Test at Headingley. Lathwell was dismissed third ball in the first innings, and made a painstaking 25 in the second innings, whilst batting to save the game. England lost this Test heavily, confirming a third successive defeat in an Ashes series. According to Cricinfo even Lathwell's mother conceded he had been picked for Test cricket too soon, and he was then dropped, and although Lathwell was picked for another England A tour to South Africa that winter, he was not as successful, undergoing a "sorry run of form". He never played for the national team again, despite this early promise, and retired from cricket in 2001, citing it as a strain.
