= Pakistani cricket team in England in 1992 =

International cricket tour

	Pakistan	England
- Dates: 4 May – 28 August 1992
Captains	Javed Miandad	Graham Gooch

Test series
- Result: Pakistan won the 5-match series 2–1
Most runs	Saleem Malik (488)	Alec Stewart (397)
Most wickets	Waqar Younis (22)	Devon Malcolm (13)
- Player of the series: Graham Gooch (Eng), Wasim Akram (Pak), Waqar Younis (Pak)

One Day International series
- Results: England won the 5-match series 4–1
Most runs	Aamir Sohail (192)	Robin Smith (258)
Most wickets	Waqar Younis (9)	Phillip DeFreitas (8)
- Player of the series: Robin Smith (Eng), Wasim Akram (Pak)

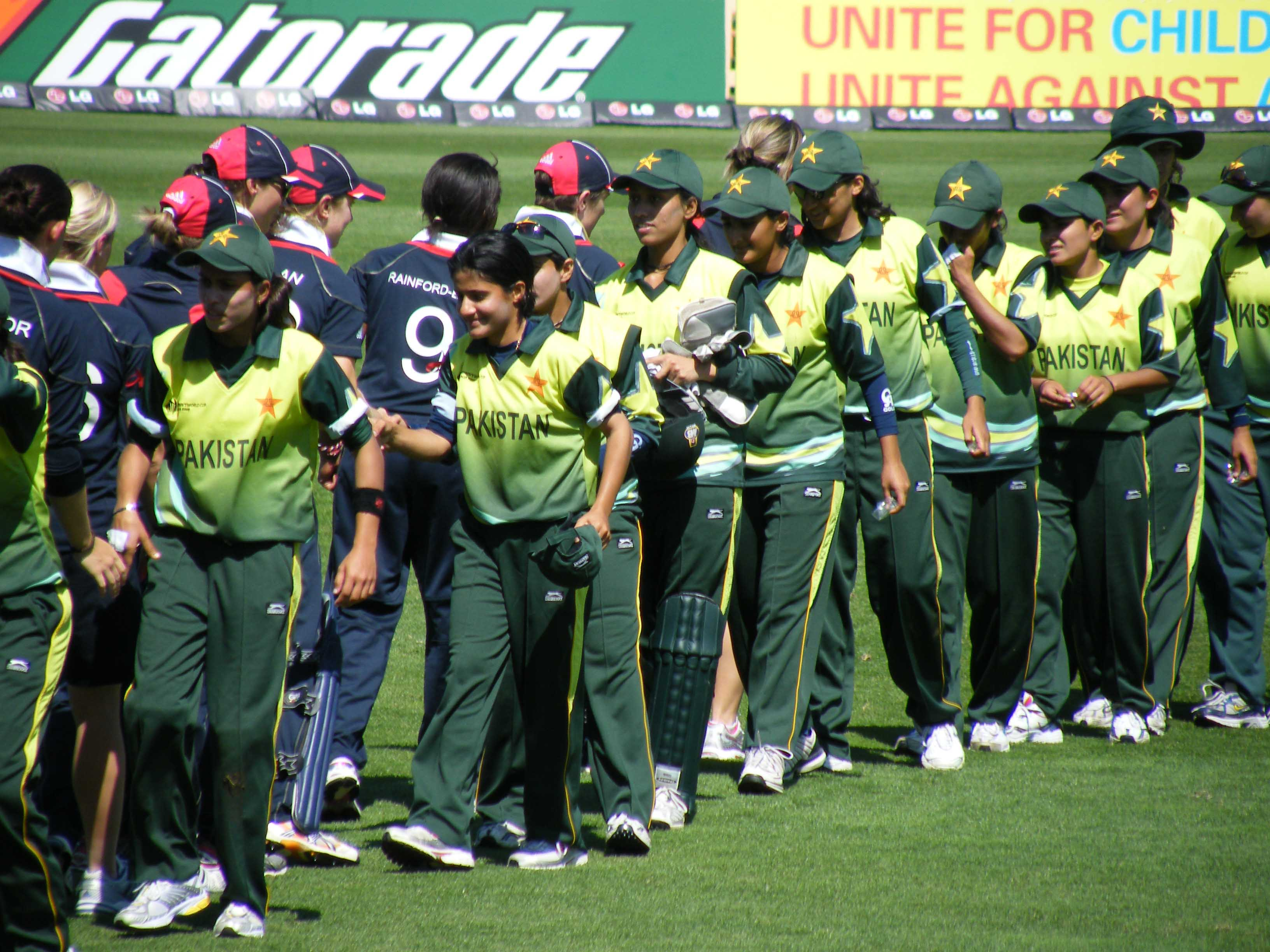
England meets Pakistan 2009

The Pakistani cricket team toured England in the 1992 English cricket season, the first tour since the acrimonious visit by England to Pakistan in 1987/88, which was highlighted by the Mike Gatting/Shakoor Rana dispute. Five Test matches and five One Day Internationals were scheduled, running from May to August.

The Test series was won 2–1 by Pakistan, who fielded a consistently strong team led by Javed Miandad and featuring the batting talent of Saleem Malik and the strike bowling partnership of Wasim Akram and Waqar Younis as well as the guile of Leg-spinner Mushtaq Ahmed. England's batting was also strong, with Alec Stewart, Graham Gooch and Robin Smith excelling, but they lacked a consistent bowling threat.

The Pakistani opening bowlers developed prodigious Reverse swing with the old ball, and ripped through the England tail on numerous occasions. Although the quality of those batsmen could certainly be called into question, the ease with which Wasim and Waqar dismissed the lower order was a significant and series-winning difference for Pakistan.

Tension between the teams bubbled beneath the surface throughout the tour. In the third test, Aaqib Javed was warned by the umpires for intimidatory bowling at Devon Malcolm, which riled up the Pakistan team. Accusations of ball tampering to produce their reverse swing were levied at Wasim and Waqar through the British press, after they were reported to the ICC Match Referee after a One-day International at Lord's. The accusations led to a high-level inquiry, but ultimately no players had action taken against them and the furore eventually died away.

England won the One-day International series 4–1, with Stewart, Smith, Graeme Hick and Neil Fairbrother leading the batting.

== Squads ==
Pakistan
Name	Style
Javed Miandad c	RHB, LB
Moin Khan wk	RHB
Aamir Sohail	LHB, SLA
Aaqib Javed	RHB, RFM
Ata-ur-Rehman	RHB, RFM
Asif Mujtaba	LHB, SLA
Ijaz Ahmed	RHB, LM
Inzamam-ul-Haq	RHB, SLA
Mushtaq Ahmed	RHB, LB
Naved Anjum	RHB, RFM
Ramiz Raja	RHB, LB
Rashid Latif	RHB, wk
Saleem Jaffar	RHB, LFM
Saleem Malik	RHB
Shoaib Mohammad	RHB, OB
Tanvir Mehdi	RHB, RMF
Wasim Akram	LHB, LF
Waqar Younis	RHB, RF
Zahid Fazal	RHB, RM/OB

England
Name	Style
Graham Gooch c	RHB, RM
Jack Russell wk	LHB
Michael Atherton	RHB, LB
Ian Botham	RHB, RFM
Phillip DeFreitas	RHB, RFM
David Gower	LHB, OB
Graeme Hick	RHB, OB
Allan Lamb	RHB, RM
Chris Lewis	RHB, RFM
Devon Malcolm	LHB, RF
Neil Mallender	RHB, RFM
Tim Munton	RHB, RFM
Derek Pringle	RHB, RMF
Mark Ramprakash	RHB, OB
Ian Salisbury	RHB, LB
Robin Smith	RHB, LB
Alec Stewart	RHB, wk
Phil Tufnell	RHB, SLA

== Test series ==
=== 1st Test ===
4–8 June
Scorecard

Pakistan	v	England
446/4d (137 overs); Saleem Malik 165 (297); PAJ DeFreitas 4/121 [33]		459/7d (119 overs); AJ Stewart 190 (261); Ata-ur-Rehman 3/69 [18]

Match drawn
Edgbaston Cricket Ground, Birmingham
Umpires: MJ Kitchen (Eng) and BJ Meyer (Eng)
Player of the match: AJ Stewart (Eng)

Play was only possible from the end of the second scheduled day, and both teams made heavy weather of bowling their opponents out. Big centuries from Miandad and Malik put the tourists in a commanding position, but they were stymied by only having a day and a half to bowl England out twice, and once Stewart had settled into his innings the draw was the only likely outcome.

DeFreitas, Lewis and Pringle shouldered the bulk of the bowling for England, but only the former enjoyed any success, his four wickets reward for perseverance. For the Pakistanis, Mushtaq Ahmed bowled 50 overs for just two wickets, and Ata-ur-Rehman, on debut, seemed under-used in hindsight, bowling just 18 overs in the innings.

This match is also notable for the debut of Inzamam-ul-Haq, who made 8 not out.

=== 2nd Test ===
18–21 June
Scorecard

England	v	Pakistan
255 (76.1 overs); AJ Stewart 74 (173); Waqar Younis 5/91 [21]		293 (98.5 overs); Aamer Sohail 73 (108); DE Malcolm 4/70 [15.5]
175 (52.4 overs); AJ Stewart 69* (138); Wasim Akram 4/66 [17.4]		141/8 (45.1 overs); Wasim Akram 45* (64); CC Lewis 3/43 [16]

Pakistan won by 2 wickets
Lord's, London
Umpires: B Dudleston (Eng) and JH Hampshire (Eng)
Player of the match: Wasim Akram (Pak)

After winning the toss and electing to bat, England initially looked to be in a promising position as Gooch and Stewart put on 123 for the first wicket. This turned out to be the biggest partnership of the match though, as from that point on, wickets fell at regular intervals. Waqar Younis ripped the heart out of the England middle order, removing Lamb, Botham and Lewis on the way to figures of 5–91. Pakistan's reply featured half-centuries from Aamir Sohail, Asif Mujtaba and Salim Malik, but they could only establish a first innings lead of 38, Malcolm and DeFreitas the pick of England's bowlers.

Second time around, only Stewart (69*) could muster any resistance, with Extras contributing the next highest score (28) in a total of 175. Wasim Akram's 4–66 was earned mostly at the expense of England's tail. Pakistan made their target of 138 look like hard work, falling to 18–3 and 95–8 with Lewis (3–43) and Ian Salisbury (3–49) their main tormentors. Once again, Wasim and Waqar combined to win the match – only this time with the bat. A dogged 45 not out from Wasim and strong support from Waqar (20*) saw Pakistan home.

Ian Salisbury's maiden Test innings ended hit wicket. He also acted as nightwatchman in the second innings.

=== 3rd Test ===
2–7 July
Scorecard

Pakistan	v	England
505/9d (126 overs); Aamer Sohail 205 (284); GA Gooch 3/39 [18]		390 (100.4 overs); GA Gooch 78 (133); Wasim Akram 5/128 [36]
239/5d (77 overs); Rameez Raja 88 (138); CC Lewis 3/46 [17]

Match drawn
Old Trafford Cricket Ground, Manchester
Umpires: R Palmer (Eng) and DR Shepherd (Eng)
Player of the match: Aamer Sohail (Pak)

With Pakistan already in a commanding position (388/3), no play was possible on the second day, making the chance of a result much less likely. Both sides attacked the bowling with relish, and Aamir Sohail's 205 was his first Test century in only his third match. Ramiz Raja, Asif Mujtaba and Javed Miandad all made half centuries as well, and only Gooch was able to stem the flow of runs, his 18 overs going for just 39.

England's reply was rather stop-start. Although Gooch, Gower, and Lewis all made half-centuries, none went on to make a really big score, and England looked in trouble at various points of in innings being 42/2, 200/5 and 256/7, before Salisbury and the debuting Tim Munton added 64 for the ninth wicket. Pakistan's pace trio of Wasim, Waqar and Aaqib Javed did the bulk of the bowling.

The final day saw Ramiz make another half-century, but the game petered out into a draw.

=== 4th Test ===
23–26 July
Scorecard

Pakistan	v	England
197 (79.3 overs); Saleem Malik 82* (164); NA Mallender 3/72 [23]		320 (113.5 overs); GA Gooch 135 (301); Waqar Younis 5/117 [30]
221 (69 overs); Saleem Malik 84* (154); NA Mallender 5/50 [23]		99/4 (42.4 overs); GA Gooch 37 (93); Mushtaq Ahmed 2/27 [13.4]

England won by 6 wickets
Headingley Cricket Ground, Leeds
Umpires: MJ Kitchen (Eng) and KE Palmer (Eng)
Player of the match: GA Gooch (Eng)

The overcast sky and seaming pitch made the selection of England's nearly-man Neil Mallender for his debut look inspired. England's all-seam attack rattled through the Pakistani batting, with only Salim Malik putting up any resistance, though he ended up stranded on 82 despite useful support from Mushtaq Ahmed that spared the tourists' blushes (they added 64 for the ninth wicket).

Gooch (135) and Atherton (76) put the lie to any demons in the pitch though, with an opening stand of 168, and with Robin Smith (42) adding another century with Gooch for the second wicket, it looked like a walkover. Waqar decimated the lower order though, picking up five wickets as England slumped from 292/2 to 320 all out.

In the second innings, Ramiz blasted 63 as wickets fell around to leave Pakistan 96/4, and again Malik was the mainstay of the innings, making 84 before running out of partners for the second time. The England batsmen made rather hard work of their target of 99, Atherton, Smith and Stewart all falling in single figures, but Gooch and then Gower saw them to victory.

=== 5th Test ===
6–9 August
Scorecard

England	v	Pakistan
207 (78.1 overs); MA Atherton 60 (190); Wasim Akram 6/67 [22.1]		380 (127.5 overs); Javed Miandad 59 (101); DE Malcolm 5/94 [29]
174 (72 overs); RA Smith 84* (179); Waqar Younis 5/52 [18]		5/0 (0.1 overs); Aamer Sohail 4* (1)

Pakistan won by 10 wickets
The Oval, London
Umpires: HD Bird (Eng) and DR Shepherd (Eng)
Player of the match: Wasim Akram (Pak)

England won the toss and batted, and the upper order all made starts, but only Atherton converted that into a half-century, and from the relative security of 182/3, Wasim (6–67) and Aaqib (2–44) worked their magic as the middle order and tail again had no answer to the Pakistani pacemen. In reply, four Pakistanis made fifties, including wicketkeeper Rashid Latif on his debut, but none of them made the huge score they'd threatened. Malcolm picked up five wickets.

England's second innings was anchored by Smith (84*), but around him the batting failed, collapsing to 59/4 before Smith, Ramprakash and Lewis steadied the innings, but eventually only able to muster 174. Waqar (5–52) was the principle destroyer, picking up the first four wickets and finishing it off by bowling Malcolm, and Wasim (3–36) again picked up the tail with little trouble. Sohail knocked off the runs from Ramprakash's first legitimate delivery.

== ODI series ==
=== 1st ODI ===
20 May 1992
Scorecard

England; 278/6 (55 overs)	v	Pakistan; 199 (54.2 overs)
Robin Smith 85 (117); Aaqib Javed 3/54 (11 overs)		Asif Mujtaba 52 (81); Derek Pringle 4/42 (11 overs)

England won by 79 runs
Lord's, London
Umpires: Barrie Meyer (ENG) and David Shepherd (Eng)
Player of the match: Robin Smith

- Pakistan won the toss and elected to field.

=== 2nd ODI ===
22 May 1992
Scorecard

England; 302/5 (55 overs)	v	Pakistan; 263 (50.5 overs)
Alec Stewart 103 (145); Mushtaq Ahmed 1/47 (11 overs)		Rameez Raja 86 (96); Derek Pringle 2/36 (9 overs)

England won by 39 runs
The Oval, London
Umpires: Mervyn Kitchen (ENG) and Roy Palmer (Eng)
Player of the match: Alec Stewart

- England won the toss and elected to bat.
- Alec Stewart scored his first century in ODIs.

=== 3rd ODI ===
20 August 1992
Scorecard

England; 363/7 (55 overs)	v	Pakistan; 165 (46.1 overs)
Robin Smith 77 (72); Waqar Younis 4/73 (11 overs)		Saleem Malik 52 (81); Phillip DeFreitas 3/33 (11 overs)

England won by 198 runs
Trent Bridge, Nottingham
Umpires: Barry Dudleston (ENG) and David Shepherd (Eng)
Player of the match: Robin Smith

- Pakistan won the toss and elected to field.
- Rashid Latif made his ODI debut.
- England set a new record for the highest total in ODIs.

=== 4th ODI ===
22–23 August 1992
Scorecard

Pakistan; 204/5 (50 overs)	v	England; 201 (46.1 overs)
Javed Miandad 50 (60); Phillip DeFreitas 2/39 (10 overs)		Allan Lamb 55 (78); Waqar Younis 3/36 (9.2 overs)

Pakistan won by 3 runs
Lord's, London
Umpires: John Hampshire (ENG) and Ken Palmer (Eng)
Player of the match: Javed Miandad

- Pakistan won the toss and elected to bat.
- Rain delayed the start of the game, reducing the match to 50 overs per side, and pushed the conclusion of England's innings into the reserve day.
- Richard Blakey made his ODI debut.

=== 5th ODI ===
24 August 1992
Scorecard

Pakistan; 254/5 (55 overs)	v	England; 255/4 (43.4 overs)
Aamer Sohail 87 (140); Dominic Cork 1/37 (11 overs)		Robin Smith 85 (91); Aamer Sohail 2/29 (7 overs)

England won by 6 wickets
Old Trafford, Manchester
Umpires: Dickie Bird (ENG) and Mervyn Kitchen (Eng)
Player of the match: Robin Smith

- Pakistan won the toss and elected to bat.
- Dominic Cork (Eng) made his ODI debut.
