= New Zealand cricket team in England in 1990 =

International cricket tour

The New Zealand cricket team toured England in the 1990 season to play a three-match Test series against England. England won the series 1-0 with 2 matches drawn.

This series was the last for the legendary New Zealand all-rounder Sir Richard Hadlee, who retired from all forms of cricket after the tour.

== One Day Internationals (ODIs) ==
England won the Texaco Trophy on faster run rate.

=== 1st ODI ===
23 May 1990
Scorecard

England; 295/6 (55 overs)	v	New Zealand; 298/6 (54.5 overs)
RA Smith 128 (168); C Pringle 2/45 (11 overs)		MJ Greatbatch 102* (104); CC Lewis 3/54 (11 overs)

New Zealand won by 4 wickets
Headingley, Leeds
Umpires: BJ Meyer and NT Plews
Player of the match: MJ Greatbatch (NZ)

- New Zealand won the toss and elected to field.
- C Pringle (NZ) made his ODI debut.

=== 2nd ODI ===
25 May 1990
Scorecard

New Zealand; 212/6 (55 overs)	v	England; 213/4 (49.3 overs)
MJ Greatbatch 111 (130); DE Malcolm 2/19 (11 overs)		GA Gooch 112* (152); RJ Hadlee 2/34 (11 overs)

England won by 6 wickets
The Oval, London
Umpires: DJ Constant and JH Hampshire
Player of the match: DE Malcolm (ENG)

- England won the toss and elected to field.
- DE Malcolm (ENG) made his ODI debut.

== Test series summary ==
=== First Test ===
7–12 June 1990
(5-day match)
Scorecard

New Zealand	v	England
208 (89 overs); MD Crowe 59 (94); PAJ DeFreitas 5/53 (22 overs)		345/9d (138 overs); MA Atherton 151 (382); RJ Hadlee 4/89 (33 overs)
36/2 (17 overs); TJ Franklin 22* (59); PAJ DeFreitas 1/0 (2 overs)

Match drawn
Trent Bridge, Nottingham
Umpires: HD Bird and JH Hampshire
Player of the match: MA Atherton (ENG)

- New Zealand won the toss and elected to bat.
- 10 June was taken as a rest day.
- MW Priest (NZ) made his Test debut.

=== Second Test ===
21–26 June 1990
(5-day match)
Scorecard

England	v	New Zealand
334 (89.4 overs); GA Gooch 85 (160); DK Morrison 4/64 (18.4 overs)		462/9d (157.4 overs); TJ Franklin 101 (310); DE Malcolm 5/94 (43 overs)
272/4d (78 overs); AJ Lamb 84* (99); JG Bracewell 2/85 (34 overs)

Match drawn
Lord's, London
Umpires: MJ Kitchen and DR Shepherd
Player of the match: RJ Hadlee (NZ)

- New Zealand won the toss and elected to field.
- 24 June was taken as a rest day.

=== Third Test ===
5–10 July 1990
(5-day match)
Scorecard

England	v	New Zealand
435 (141.5 overs); GA Gooch 154 (281); RJ Hadlee 3/97 (37.5 overs)		249 (98.3 overs); TJ Franklin 66 (207); EE Hemmings 6/58 (27.3 overs)
158 (49 overs); MA Atherton 70 (132); RJ Hadlee 5/53 (21 overs)		230 (91.4 overs); JG Wright 46 (93); DE Malcolm 5/46 (24.4 overs)

England won by 114 runs
Edgbaston, Birmingham
Umpires: JW Holder and BJ Meyer
Player of the match: DE Malcolm (ENG)

- New Zealand won the toss and elected to field.
- 8 July was taken as a rest day.
- CC Lewis (ENG) and AC Parore (NZ) made their Test debuts.

== External sources ==
- CricketArchive – tour itineraries

== Annual reviews ==
- Playfair Cricket Annual 1991
- Wisden Cricketers' Almanack 1991
