= Peter Such =

English cricketer (born 1964)

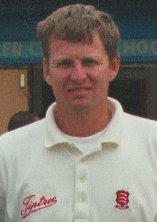

Personal information
- Born: 12 June 1964 (age 62); Helensburgh, Dunbartonshire, Scotland
- Batting: Right-handed
- Bowling: Right-arm off-break

International information
- National side: England
- Test debut: 3 June 1993 v Australia
- Last Test: 5 August 1999 v New Zealand

Career statistics
Competition	Test	First-class
Matches	11	306
Runs scored	67	1,645
Batting average	6.09	8.14
100s/50s	0/0	0/2
Top score	14*	54
Balls bowled	3,124	58,448
Wickets	37	849
Bowling average	33.56	30.54
5 wickets in innings	2	48
10 wickets in match	0	9
Best bowling	6/67	8/93
Catches/stumpings	4/–	119/–
- Source: CricInfo, 6 November 2022

Peter Mark Such (born 12 June 1964) is an English cricketer, cricket coach, and match referee. An off-spinner, Such was brought into the Test arena in 1993 as a replacement for John Emburey but, despite taking 6 for 67 on debut and being the highest wicket taker for England in the series only played an initial eight Tests before having to wait five years before his next appearance.

== Career ==
Such enjoyed a 19-year first-class career including stints at Nottinghamshire and Leicestershire before joining Essex in 1990. It was at Essex where he gained most success although he is perhaps best remembered for hitting the winning boundary in the second day of a Natwest Trophy semi final against Glamorgan in 1997 when play had been suspended the day before due to bad light with Mark Ilott and Robert Croft having an on field confrontation seen on BBC television. Essex went on to win the Trophy. Such also helped Essex to win the County Championship in 1991 and 1992. He toured Australia with England 'A', taking 11 for 134 (comprising figures of 7 for 82 and 4 for 62) in victory over the Commonwealth Bank Cricket Academy, and dismissing Ricky Ponting and Adam Gilchrist twice each. During the 1993 season, when he made his England debut, Such bowled more first-class overs than any other bowler, and also took 76 wickets, more than any bowler except Mushtaq Ahmed and Steve Watkin. He also took 56 wickets in the County Championship in 1997.

He also enjoyed success on his eventual recall to the England team against Australia, taking 11 wickets in the Ashes in 1998–9, including his other test five-wicket haul, 5 for 81 at Sydney. Although not noted for his batting, in 1999, playing in his final Test at Old Trafford, he made the second-longest duck in Test history, from 52 balls, against New Zealand, and earned a standing ovation.

Such joined the ECB in 2009, going full-time in 2012, to work with bowlers throughout the England Performance Pathway as the National Lead Spin Bowling Coach. After leaving the role in November 2019 Such became a match referee ahead of the 2020 English cricket season.

== See also ==
- List of Test cricketers born in non-Test playing nations
