= Joey Benjamin =

English cricketer (1961–2021)

Personal information
- Full name: Joseph Emmanuel Benjamin
- Born: 2 February 1961; St. Kitts
- Died: 8 March 2021 (aged 60)
- Batting: Right-handed
- Bowling: Right-arm medium-fast

International information
- National side: England
- Test debut (cap 570): 18 August 1994 v South Africa
- ODI debut (cap 128): 6 December 1994 v Australia
- Last ODI: 7 January 1995 v Zimbabwe

Domestic team information
- Years: Team
- 1988–1991: Warwickshire
- 1992–1999: Surrey

Career statistics
| Competition | Test | ODI | FC | LA |
|---|---|---|---|---|
| Matches | 1 | 2 | 126 | 168 |
| Runs scored | 0 | 0 | 1,161 | 327 |
| Batting average | 0.00 | 0.00 | 11.38 | 9.90 |
| 100s/50s | 0/0 | 0/0 | 0/0 | 0/0 |
| Top score | 0 | 0 | 49 | 25 |
| Balls bowled | 168 | 72 | 22,664 | 7,892 |
| Wickets | 4 | 1 | 387 | 173 |
| Bowling average | 20.00 | 47.00 | 29.94 | 31.80 |
| 5 wickets in innings | 0 | 0 | 17 | 0 |
| 10 wickets in match | 0 | 0 | 1 | 0 |
| Best bowling | 4/42 | 1/22 | 6/19 | 4/19 |
| Catches/stumpings | 0/– | 0/– | 25/– | 29/– |
- Source: Cricinfo, 10 March 2021

Joseph Emmanuel Benjamin (2 February 1961 – 8 March 2021) was a St Kitts–born English cricketer who played in one Test match and two One Day Internationals in 1994 and 1995. He also played county cricket for Warwickshire and Surrey County Cricket Clubs from 1988 to 1999.

== Early life ==
Benjamin was born in Christ Church, Saint Kitts, on 2 February 1961. His family relocated to the United Kingdom when he was 15 years old and resided at first in the Midlands. He played in the Birmingham League, where his performances in sporadic fixtures for Staffordshire drew initial attention.

== Career ==
Benjamin signed his first county contract for Warwickshire in 1988, when he was 27. He was unable to receive regular playing time, with Gladstone Small, Tim Munton, and Allan Donald starting ahead of him. Benjamin ultimately featured in 25 first-class matches in his four years with the team.

Benjamin went on to play with Surrey from 1992 until 1999. He was honored as the team's Player of the Year in 1993. He claimed 64 wickets at 27.85 that year and took 6 for 19 against Nottinghamshire, the best in his career. He managed to better those numbers the following season, with 80 wickets at 20.72, and received his first international call-up that same year. He had 53 wickets at a decent rate of 25.01 in 1995, but he began to lose playing time from that season onwards. In his final season with Surrey in 1999, the club won the County Championship, though he only played in two of the matches. He was subsequently released by the team. For his career, Benjamin took 387 wickets in first-class cricket between 1988 and 1999, at an average of 29.94. His best effort with the bat was a first-class 49 while his average stood at 11.38, leading Cricinfo to describe his batting as "the hit-and-miss variety".

A One-Test wonder, Benjamin's single Test match appearance for England came in 1994 when he was selected for the final Test of the series against South Africa at The Oval, his home ground. He performed well in the match taking four wickets in the first innings. However, his effort was overshadowed by Devon Malcolm's spectacular nine-wicket haul in the second innings. He was 33 at the time, and did not play any more Test matches for England as the national selectors preferred to concentrate on younger seam bowlers like Angus Fraser and Chris Lewis.

== Later life ==
After retiring from cricket, Benjamin remained in Surrey. There, he coached at Reigate Grammar School and Reigate Priory Cricket Club.

Benjamin died of a heart attack on 8 March 2021. He was sixty years old.
