= South African cricket team in England in 1994 =

International cricket tour

South Africa in England in 1994
	England	South Africa
- Dates: 23 June – 4 September 1994
Captains	Mike Atherton	Kepler Wessels

Test series
- Result: 3-match series drawn 1–1
Most runs	Graeme Hick (304)	Brian McMillan (264)
Most wickets	Darren Gough (11)	Fanie de Villiers (12)
- Player of the series: Devon Malcolm (Eng) and Brian McMillan (SA)

One Day International series
- Results: England won the 2-match series 2–0
Most runs	Graeme Hick (81)	Daryll Cullinan (99)
Most wickets	Phillip DeFreitas (4)	Allan Donald (2)
- Player of the series: Phillip DeFreitas (Eng) and Daryll Cullinan (SA)

The South African cricket team toured England during the 1994 season. This was their first tour to England after the apartheid-inspired international sporting ban was rescinded. The team was led by Eastern Province's Kepler Wessels, who had returned to his native country after playing 24 Tests for Australia during the International ban years.

South Africa had made a promising start to their International return, drawing their two most recent series, home and away against Australia, and some talents had begun to emerge already. Allan Donald was already well known to English spectators from his extended and successful spell as Warwickshire's overseas player from 1987 onwards, and had spearheaded the South African attack with 63 Test wickets prior to this series, and Fanie de Villiers made a useful foil, having taken 22 wickets against the Australians, including 6−43 in the victory at Sydney. Andrew Hudson had emerged as a superb opener, racking up centuries against the West Indies and Australia and nine fifties in his short career. Jonty Rhodes had established himself as one of the top fielders in the world already, and had won over doubters of his batting with a never-say-die attitude, which characterised the whole team, even where outright ability was lacking.

England had just completed a victorious series against New Zealand, but seemed flattered by the tourists reliance on a couple of key players. The South Africans would provide a much more useful yardstick of Ray Illingworth's management of the team, and there were still doubts over middle order batsmen Robin Smith and Graeme Hick and the strength of the bowling, despite Phillip DeFreitas's re-emergence. New caps Darren Gough and Craig White had looked promising against New Zealand, but had yet to be seriously tested.

The Test series was drawn 1−1, with South Africa starting very well and dominating the First Test before England recovered to level the series on the back of somewhat improved batting and the raw pace of Devon Malcolm, whose 9/57 in the second innings at The Oval earned him the nickname of "The Destroyer" in South Africa. The One-Day series was won more comfortably by the hosts, 2−0. The tourists' victory in the First Test was somewhat overshadowed by the controversy over ball tampering by England captain Michael Atherton, who was seen taking dirt from his pocket while fielding and using it to dry the ball.

== Historical significance ==
This was an historic time for South African sport as the national sporting teams made their way back into the International arena, and reminded viewers around the world of the country's sporting pedigree. The International Cricket Council (ICC) re-admitted South Africa to world cricket in July 1991, after 21 years during which the only significant exposure to South African cricket had been through "rebel" tours.

This was the cricket team's first tour to England since 1965, and tour manager Fritz Bing summed up the visitors' mood on arrival, noting that they returned to "the Mother Country not as rebels, beggars, or enemies, but as confident, happy children...we come proudly through the front door". Although there were no black cricketers in this tour party, the team enjoyed overwhelming support back home, with Jonty Rhodes being identified as a new hero among young black cricketers in South Africa.

South Africa's deputy president, Thabo Mbeki, flew to London for the First Test, and Dr Ali Bacher was feted at a Lord's Taverners dinner on the eve of the Test, where he gave a speech outlining the development plan for cricket in South Africa's townships.

Despite all the media attention, Wessels was keen to keep the focus on cricket, rather than politics. "We're a more confident side now, though," he said the day before the First Test, "and no longer regard ourselves as newcomers. We have to look past the emotion of the occasion, but we have been involved in a few special occasions since our return to the fold, so we should be getting used to it by now."

== Squads ==
England	South Africa
Michael Atherton(c); Steve Rhodes (wk); Joey Benjamin; John Crawley; Phillip DeFreitas; Neil Fairbrother; Angus Fraser; Darren Gough; Graham Gooch; Graeme Hick; Devon Malcolm; Ian Salisbury; Alec Stewart; Graham Thorpe; Phil Tufnell; Shaun Udal; Craig White	Kepler Wessels (c); David Richardson (wk); Hansie Cronje; Daryll Cullinan; Fanie de Villiers; Allan Donald .; Andrew Hudson; Gary Kirsten; Peter Kirsten; Craig Matthews; Brian McMillan; Jonty Rhodes; Tim Shaw; Richard Snell; Pat Symcox

== Test series ==
=== 1st Test ===
21–24 July 1994
Scorecard

South Africa	v	England
357 (118.5 overs); Kepler Wessels 105 (217); Darren Gough 4/76 (28 overs)		180 (61.3 overs); Graeme Hick 38 (88); Allan Donald 5/74 (19.3 overs)
278/8d (102.3 overs); Gary Kirsten 44 (126); Darren Gough 4/46 (19.3 overs)		99 (45.5 overs); Graham Gooch 28 (51); Brian McMillan 3/16 (6.5 overs)

South Africa won by 356 runs
Lord's, London
Umpires: Dickie Bird (Eng) and Steve Randell (Aus)
Player of the match: Kepler Wessels (SA)

- South Africa won the toss and elected to bat.

South Africa went into the historic match with four front-line seamers and no spinner, selecting the same side that had drawn their last test, with Australia. England made two changes from the drawn test with New Zealand, John Crawley coming into the side to make his debut at the expense of Robin Smith and Ian Salisbury replacing Peter Such as the side's spinner.

South Africa won the toss and opted to bat first on a flat-looking Lord's pitch, but after seeing off the initial burst from Phillip DeFreitas, Andrew Hudson fell to Darren Gough, and Hansie Cronje followed soon after to Angus Fraser. From 35/2, the tourists looked in a little trouble, but Gary Kirsten and captain Kepler Wessels (105) dug in and built obdurate innings, adding 106 before Kirsten (72) holed out to DeFreitas off Graeme Hick's bowling. Peter Kirsten was another Gough victim, caught behind by Steven Rhodes, and although Jonty Rhodes put on 75 with his skipper, both fell just before the close, leaving the honours relatively even at 244/6. Wessels' century was compiled in just under six hours and comprised 15 fours.

The second morning saw the South African lower order take the attack to the England bowlers, adding over a hundred for the last four wickets. Craig Matthews was the principal architect, striking 41 in just 36 balls. England's response started briskly, but not very successfully. Alec Stewart and captain Mike Atherton fell to the pace of Allan Donald, while Crawley edged Fanie De Villiers' swing to second slip. Hick and Graham Gooch consolidated, but both were dismissed in De Villiers' second spell and the rest of the lower-middle order followed quickly on the second evening. DeFreitas and then Gough dragged the score past the follow-on target, but couldn't inspire England to any heroics. Donald wrapped up both to finish with five wickets, diving forward to take a return catch to get rid of Gough, while Fraser was run out by Gary Kirsten trying to run a third, leaving Salisbury stranded having added just six in almost an hour.

South Africa lost Hudson early again in the second innings, but Cronje and Gary Kirsten made a solid start to the innings, though the third afternoon was something of a grind, the visitors adding just 62 and losing the two set batsmen. Hick and Salisbury both enjoyed significant turn, if fairly little success, picking up just one wicket each in the innings, but they bowled tidily and economically, with Hick eventually tempting a frustrated Gary Kirsten down the wicket, only to beat the edge and Steven Rhodes took a neat stumping. Salisbury picked up the captain's wicket just after tea, but Peter Kirsten (42) and Jonty Rhodes saw the team safely to the close. These two, and then when Gough ripped them out, Brian McMillan (39*) and Matthews, pushed the lead quickly up to 450 before Wessels declared when Matthews was out, leaving his bowlers five sessions to win the match.

It did not take that long - England's second innings lasted just under 46 overs. Atherton and Stewart saw off Donald's opening spell, but then fell to De Villiers and the two back-up seamers. Stewart managed to hold out for two hours for his 27, but Matthews took two wickets in two balls, and despite Gooch passing Viv Richards as the fourth-highest Test run scorer during his 28, nobody had answers to South Africa's bowlers. The fielding was kept tight, and each of the bowlers chipped in with wickets as the batting collapsed and the tourists marched to a dominant victory.

During the Test, former South African opening batsman Barry Richards bemoaned the lack of fight in the England team, commenting that "...it puzzles me why the new breed of England batsmen are failing to stamp their authority on an innings. People like Stewart and Hick have all the ability at Test level but they do not seem to want to grab the game by the scruff of its neck and say to the opposition bowlers: 'I'm here. Come and get me if you can.'". meanwhile, in The Guardian, Mike Selvey praised the South African seamers, and Scyld Berry singled out Fanie De Villiers' bowling on the second day as the turning point of the match, and the above commentators pointed out England's lack of success at the home of cricket and questioned the lack of a left-handed batsman in the eleven.

The England captain described his team's performance as "the worst under my captaincy".

==== The "dirt in pocket" controversy ====
On the third day of the First Test, television footage showed England captain Mike Atherton apparently removing some substance from his pocket and rubbing it onto the ball, which could be construed as ball tampering. Atherton was summoned to see the Match Referee, Peter Burge, after play had finished for the day, and gave his explanation, which included a denial that he had used any substance to alter the condition of the ball at any time in his career.

When it later emerged that Atherton had dirt in his pocket that he had used to keep his fingers dry, Atherton recalled the conversation with the Match Referee thus:

"I did take my trousers to the meeting," he explained [in the press conference]. "He asked me if I had resin in my pocket; I replied 'no'. He asked me if there had been any other substance; I replied 'no'. That is where I made my mistake. I was thinking of other substances such as iron filings or Lipsyl. There was absolutely no other substance [apart from earth] in my pocket."

Atherton was fined £2,000 by Chairman of Selectors Ray Illingworth for not being totally frank with the Match Referee, but retained the captaincy despite calls from some quarters for him to step down or be sacked, with Pakistan manager Intikhab Alam particularly vociferous on the topic, telling The Sun newspaper "Atherton has been caught red-handed. He has to be replaced. What more evidence do people want? It's just not acceptable behaviour from somebody who is supposed to be the leader of the team", while The Sun also published pictures that seemed to show Allan Donald lifting the seam of the ball.

=== 2nd Test ===
4–8 August 1994
Scorecard

England	v	South Africa
477/9d (160.3 overs); Mike Atherton 99 (224); Brian McMillan 3/93 (37 overs)		447 (133.1 overs); Peter Kirsten 104 (226); Phillip DeFreitas 4/89 (29.1 overs)
267/5d (78.3 overs); Graeme Hick 110 (192); Brian McMillan 2/66 (15.3 overs)		116/3 (60 overs); Gary Kirsten 65 (128); Phil Tufnell 2/31 (23 overs)

Match drawn
Headingley, Leeds
Umpires: Steve Dunne (NZ) and David Shepherd (Eng)
Player of the match: Peter Kirsten (SA)

- England won the toss and elected to bat.

South Africa named the same side for the Second Test that had been so dominant in the First, while England made two changes: Graham Thorpe came in for all-rounder Craig White and Phil Tufnell replaced Salisbury as the specialist spinner. Fraser and Gough both recovered from knocks on the hand suffered while batting in the First Test and retained their places. England won the toss and batted first on what turned out to be a slowish pitch.

Gooch returned to the top of the order for this Test, but made only 23 before becoming the first of De Villiers' three victims, caught at slip by McMillan. Hick batted with confidence, but fell to the same combination for 25. Meanwhile, Atherton batted serenely, and was joined by Thorpe. These two added a superb 142 in just under three hours, punishing the more wayward attack whenever they strayed from a good line. Thorpe took the aggressor's role, striking 13 boundaries in his 72, but perished playing a lazy drive, and Jonty Rhodes took an easy catch at point. Atherton fell soon after, having batted for over five hours, and just missed out on his century, gifting a return catch to McMillan for a defiant 99 (nine fours and one six) that had allowed the other top order batsmen to play around him.

Crawley (38) and Stewart (89) added a century stand of their own on the second morning, while the South African bowlers strove for the breakthrough in vain. Allan Donald was used in short bursts, as he was struggling with a toe injury, and it was just before lunch that Crawley was finally dismissed, having played a great supporting role. Steve Rhodes (65*) also contributed well, and shepherded the tail to a good position, adding 53 with Gough, and allowing Atherton to declare the innings and have nine overs at the tourists' openers. Hudson was again out cheaply, caught by the captain off Gough, before the close.

The third morning was very much England's - DeFreitas picked up Gary Kirsten, caught behind, and then Cronje, bowled first ball, in the first over of the day, and Wessels was dropped twice before he settled in and helped nightwatchman Dave Richardson (48) add sixty. The bounce was rather variable at this stage of the match, with several deliveries scuttling through rather low, and these two both went before lunch to Fraser, leaving South Africa at 105/5. The rest of the day belonged to the visitors though. Peter Kirsten struck up intelligent partnerships with Rhodes (46) and McMillan, and brought up his maiden Test century (104 from 226 balls, 13 boundaries) shortly before the close, only to be dismissed by DeFreitas soon afterwards. McMillan (78) continued the onslaught the next morning, adding another 77 with Matthews (62*), and the tail helped to raise the South African total to 447.

The tourists' hopes of pulling off another victory took a blow when it was revealed that Donald would not be able to bowl in the second innings because of his injury, but De Villiers and Matthews kept things very tight early on, after the experiment of opening with McMillan went awry, and under the pressure of scoring quickly to set a target Atherton and Gooch were both early victims. Thorpe and Hick batted through to the close with few further alarms. The final morning saw England start cautiously, but gradually increase their rate, until by the end they were pushing at more than six an over. Hick (110, nine fours, three sixes) accelerated from 50 to his century with ease, while Thorpe made 73 in good time, and Stewart 36 at a run a ball, allowing England to declare at lunch, setting the South Africans 298 to win. Hudson's fourth consecutive failure gave the home team hope that they might prompt a collapse, but the visitors declined to press for the runs, and crawled to 116/3 from the 60 overs that were bowled before the captains agreed to a draw, half an hour before the scheduled close. Tufnell picked up two wickets, while DeFreitas got the unlucky Gary Kirsten, whose bat was nowhere near the ball when adjudged caught behind. This was the first drawn Test at Headingley since 1980.

=== 3rd Test ===
18–21 August 1994
Scorecard

South Africa	v	England
332 (92.2 overs); Brian McMillan 93 (193); Joey Benjamin 4/42 (17 overs)		304 (77 overs); Graham Thorpe 79 (115); Fanie de Villiers 4/62 (19 overs)
175 (50.3 overs); Daryll Cullinan 94 (134); Devon Malcolm 9/57 (16.3 overs)		205/2 (35.3 overs); Graeme Hick 81* (81); Craig Matthews 1/37 (11.3 overs)

England won by 8 wickets
The Oval, London
Umpires: Steve Dunne (NZ) and David Shepherd (Eng)
Player of the match: Devon Malcolm (Eng)

- South Africa won the toss and elected to bat.

South Africa dropped Hudson for the Final Test after his run of low scores and Peter Kirsten moved up to open the batting with his brother, while Daryll Cullinan came into the middle order. Donald recovered from his sore toe to lead the bowling attack. Fraser and Tufnell were left out of the England side from the Second Test, with Devon Malcolm coming in to make use of the pace of the pitch and Surrey's Joey Benjamin making his Test debut in an all-seam attack. The selectors no doubt hoped he could use his knowledge of conditions at The Oval to supplement his fast-medium pace.

South Africa won the toss and took first use of the traditionally-quick track, but looked in terrible trouble when the Kirstens fell to DeFreitas (4-93) and Malcolm early on, and then, after Cronje (38) and Wessels (45) had steadied the ship a little, Benjamin (4-42) had Cronje adjudged in front and Cullinan edged a DeFreitas delivery to a gleeful Steven Rhodes.

Jonty Rhodes added to the South Africans' worries when he ducked into a short ball from Malcolm and had to retire hurt, while Wessels became Benjamin's second leg before victim, leaving the tourists 136/5 and a man short. McMillan and Richardson (58) took the attack back to the England bowlers in the second half of the day, adding a vital 124 before Richardson edged Benjamin to Rhodes, and Matthews uncharacteristically failed, diverting one to Hick at slip without scoring. McMillan and Donald took South Africa safely to the close, but the former added just two to his overnight total to be ninth man out for a rumbustious 93, and Rhodes didn't return to bat.

England's innings started badly, with Atherton departing to De Villiers' first delivery and showing a degree of dissent about the lbw decision that cost him half his match fee as a fine. Gooch was kept bogged down by the seamers and was dismissed by Donald soon after lunch for a paltry 8, having scrabbled around for about an hour. Hick (39) started well, but succumbed to a leg-stump yorker from Donald, but Thorpe and Stewart counter-attacked, adding 52 for the fourth wicket before Matthews bowled Thorpe for 79. Crawley lasted just 12 balls before becoming another of Donald's victims, and Rhodes provided Stewart (62) with good support, but both were dismissed late in the day by De Villiers. DeFreitas (37) and Gough (42*) added quick-fire runs at the end of the day, before DeFreitas was run out early on the third morning, and De Villiers (4-42) and Matthews mopped up the tail.

Having received a short ball to the helmet from De Villiers during his brief innings, Devon Malcolm came out to bowl all fired up, allegedly having told De Villiers "You guys are history!", He demolished the South African batting. He ripped out Peter and Gary Kirsten and Hansie Cronje before the tourists had a chance to draw breath, leaving them 1/3. Wessels and Cullinan stabilised the innings, but the captain was next to go, also to Malcolm, and Cullinan's approach seemed to be to attack anything he could - as the only batsman capable of fending Malcolm off, his innings of 94 (134 balls, 12 boundaries) was immense, and with DeFreitas bowling niggardly spells whenever Malcolm had to rest, the South Africans had no respite. Meanwhile, McMillan (25), Richardson and Matthews all fell to Malcolm quickly, and although Jonty Rhodes came in to bat at number nine, no one else could stem the tide of wickets. Cullinan eventually went to Gough, and Malcolm cleaned up Rhodes and Donald, to finish with figures of 9 for 57, the fourth best Test bowling analysis by an England bowler.

England's batsmen set about their target of 204 with great relish, adding 107 from the 16 overs remaining on the third evening. Atherton (63) batted steadily but robustly, allowing those around him to score freely. Gooch (33 from 20 balls) was the only wicket to fall, and the following morning, they continued in the same vein. Hick made 81 at a run a ball, and Thorpe rounded things off with a quick-fire 15, driving down the ground for four to seal the victory, after Atherton edged one to Richardson with 24 required to win.

== ODI series ==
=== 1st ODI ===
25 August 1994
Scorecard

South Africa; 215/7 (55 overs)	v	England; 219/4 (54 overs)
Daryll Cullinan 45 (87); Chris Lewis 3/32 (8 overs)		Graeme Hick 81 (116); Tim Shaw 1/34 (11 overs)

England won by 6 wickets
Edgbaston, Birmingham
Umpires: Chris Balderstone and Dickie Bird
Player of the match: Graeme Hick (Eng)

- South Africa won the toss and elected to bat.

=== 2nd ODI ===
27–28 August 1994
Scorecard

South Africa; 181/9 (55 overs)	v	England; 182/6 (48.2 overs)
Daryll Cullinan 54 (92); Dominic Cork 3/49 (11 overs)		Steve Rhodes 56 (75); Allan Donald 2/47 (10.2 overs)

England won by 4 wickets
Old Trafford, Manchester
Umpires: Mervyn Kitchen and Ken Palmer
Player of the match: Steve Rhodes (Eng)

- England won the toss and elected to field.
- Rain on 27 August with England at 80/4 from 26 overs forced play into a second day.

== Series summary ==
=== England ===
The momentum in this tour swung decisively in England's favour only in the Third Test with Devon Malcolm's fiery burst of quick bowling, although hints of a recovery were clear in the Second Test, with Atherton, Stewart, Rhodes, Thorpe and Hick all showing signs of confidence. Malcolm's impact was evidenced by his selection of England's man of the series despite playing only the one Test.

Four of the batsmen picked up 200 runs or more (Thorpe, Hick, Stewart, Atherton), while Fraser, Gough and DeFreitas all contributed with the ball sufficiently to augur well for the forthcoming Ashes series. Rhodes looked secure behind the stumps and showed resilience with the bat.

=== South Africa ===
The South Africans will be concerned that they allowed the series victory to slip away following their strong performance in the First Test. They had no answer to Malcolm's pace in the final innings of the series, and questions are likely to be raised about their collapse.

Christopher Martin-Jenkins noted in The Times that the tourists were "too dependent on their fast-medium bowling" and that the batting would look a little shaky when Wessels retires, given the performances of Hudson and Cronje, though he praised Darryl Cullinan's emergence as "a batsman of genuine Test class".

Only McMillan and Wessels made 200 runs, though Cullinan showed vigour in compiling 101 in the Third Test, but the pace quartet all contributed at times, De Villiers and Donald each picking up 12 wickets in the series.

== External sources ==
CricketArchive
