= Fritz Bing =

South African cricketer, businessman and cricket administrator

Personal information
- Born: 22 September 1934; Sea Point, Cape Town, Cape Province, South Africa
- Died: 24 September 2023 (aged 89); Cape Town, Western Cape, South Africa
- Batting: Right-handed

Domestic team information
- Years: Team
- 1954/55–1960/61: Western Province

Career statistics
Competition	First-class
Matches	8
Runs scored	251
Batting average	19.30
100s/50s	0/2
Top score	85
Catches/stumpings	3/–
- Source: Cricinfo, 8 May 2024

Fritz Bing (22 September 1934 – 24 September 2023) was a South African cricketer and businessman who became a leading cricket administrator.

== Life and career ==
Bing was born in Cape Town and attended Wynberg Boys' High School, where he was head prefect in 1952. He was a right-handed batsman who played eight matches of first-class cricket for Western Province, spread over seven seasons. His most successful matches were his last two. Batting at number three against Border in the 1960–61 Currie Cup, he scored 20 and 85 (the highest score on either side) in a 237-run victory. A week later, he scored 62 and 12 against Orange Free State, this time in a 28-run loss.

In 1957, Bing married Jenny Jones, whose father, A. P. Jones, owned a department store under his name in Fish Hoek, a coastal suburb of Cape Town. Bing joined the store, managing the men's department. He established a sporting goods department in the store, and also established South Africa's first cricket ball making factory. Bing bought the A. P. Jones store in 1984; it is now run by later generations of his family. Fritz and Jenny had four children, all boys.

Bing served as president of the Western Province Cricket Union between 1981 and 1989. He played an active role during the unification process between the (white) WPCU and the (non-white) Western Province Cricket Board during 1991. In 1994 he served as manager of the first post-apartheid South African team to tour England.

Bing lived in Noordhoek, Cape Town, for more than 60 years. He died in September 2023, two days after his 89th birthday.
