= Devon Malcolm =

English cricketer

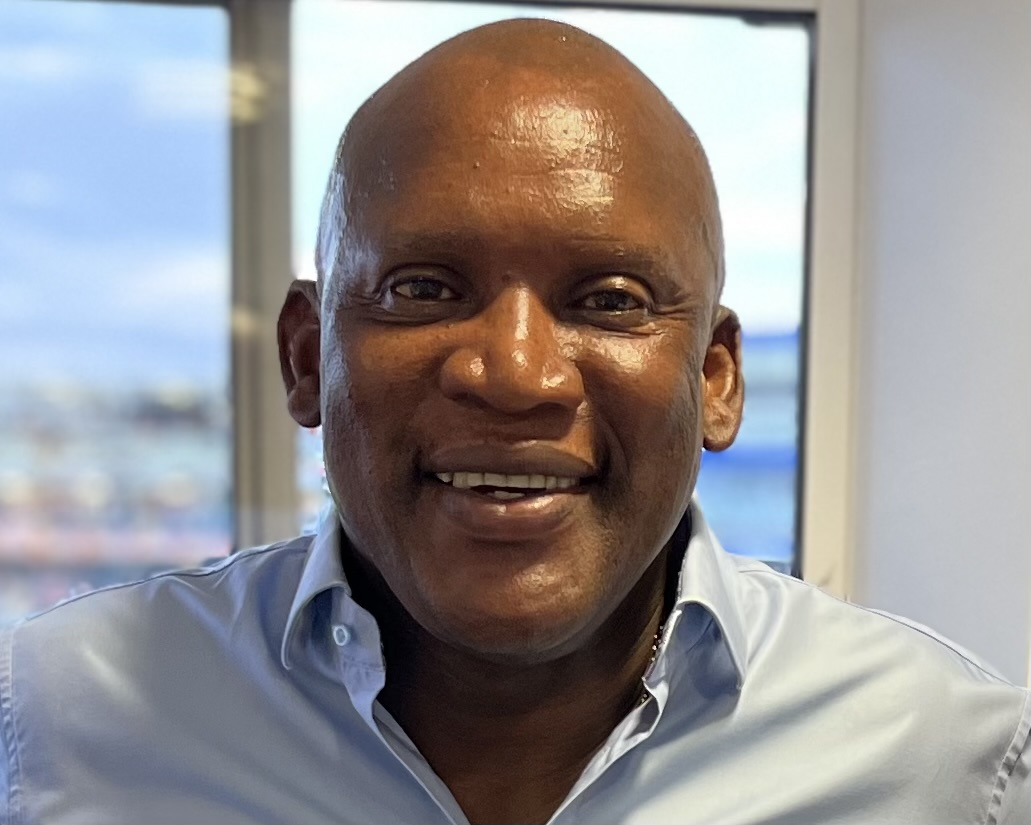

Personal information
- Full name: Devon Eugene Malcolm
- Born: 22 February 1963 (age 63); Kingston, Jamaica
- Height: 189 cm (6 ft 2 in)
- Batting: Right-handed
- Bowling: Right arm fast
- Role: Bowler

International information
- National side: England (1989–1997)
- Test debut (cap 539): 10 August 1989 v Australia
- Last Test: 23 August 1997 v Australia
- ODI debut (cap 107): 25 May 1990 v New Zealand
- Last ODI: 16 February 1994 v West Indies

Domestic team information
- Years: Team
- 1984–1997: Derbyshire
- 1998–2000: Northamptonshire
- 2001–2003: Leicestershire

Career statistics
Competition	Test	ODI	FC	LA
Matches	40	10	304	185
Runs scored	236	9	1,985	313
Batting average	6.05	3.00	7.84	5.21
100s/50s	0/0	0/0	0/2	0/0
Top score	29	4	51	42
Balls bowled	8,480	526	53,284	8,982
Wickets	128	16	1,054	249
Bowling average	37.09	25.25	30.33	27.61
5 wickets in innings	5	0	46	2
10 wickets in match	2	0	9	0
Best bowling	9/57	3/40	9/57	7/35
Catches/stumpings	7/–	1/–	45/–	21/–
- Source: Cricinfo, 11 November 2009

Devon Eugene Malcolm OBE (born 22 February 1963) is a Jamaican-born English former cricketer. Born in Kingston, Jamaica, Malcolm played in 40 Test matches and 10 One Day Internationals for the England cricket team.

Malcolm was one of the fastest bowlers in world cricket, with his career best performance of nine wickets for 57 runs against South Africa being one of the best innings performances in Test history. However, his playing style was also notable for his short-sightedness and poor catching, his powerful throwing arm, his perceived profligacy with the ball and his undoubted ineptitude with the bat, with his batting and fielding being described as of "court-jester standard".

A graph showing Malcolm's Test career bowling statistics and how they have varied over time.

His under-average ability as a batsman, however, seemed to add to his popularity. He was often cheered when he went out to bat, more often than not at number eleven, a position for which he was often in competition with Phil Tufnell. He hit some huge sixes for both England and Derbyshire and was a particular favourite of commentator Brian Johnston.

As the cricket writer, Colin Bateman, noted, "Malcolm, incredibly wholehearted with an easy charm off the field, became a national hero."

Following his retirement, Malcolm became chairman of Brixworth Cricket Club in Northamptonshire. He was appointed Officer of the Order of the British Empire (OBE) in the 2025 Birthday Honours for services to cricket and to diversity in cricket.

== Domestic career ==
Malcolm was one of England's very few genuinely fast bowlers of the 1990s. Born in Kingston, Jamaica, he emigrated to Sheffield in 1979 and studied there at Richmond College.

Malcolm first played with Derbyshire in 1984, and was with the county until 1997. Highlights of his time with Derbyshire included the county's victories in the Refuge Assurance League in 1990 and the Benson and Hedges Cup in 1993, Malcolm taking 3–23 in the semi-final of the latter against Northamptonshire. Malcolm remained a highly effective bowler in county cricket thereafter, and in 1998 moved to play for Northamptonshire. Two years later he moved again, this time to Leicestershire, for whom he played his final first-class match in 2003. In his final season Malcolm claimed over 60 wickets and achieved one 10-wicket haul. He was still one of quickest bowlers in the country towards the end of his career, winning aged 38 the challenge for bowling the fastest delivery in the 2001 C&G Trophy at a speed of 89.5 mph (144 km/h). He passed 1,000 first-class wickets while with Leicestershire.

== International career ==
Malcolm's chance to play for England came when several members of the Test team announced their intention to take part in a rebel tour to South Africa during the 1989 Ashes series, thereby disqualifying themselves from selection for the rest of the series. He made his international debut in the Fifth Test against an Australia national cricket team already 3–0 up in the series. His first day in international cricket ended wicketless, as did all his team-mates, for this was the occasion on which Mark Taylor and Geoff Marsh batted together unbeaten throughout the first day. On the second day, Malcolm managed his first scalp, dismissing Steve Waugh for a duck – although it made little difference to the outcome: Australia crushed England by an innings. Malcolm scored 14 runs in his two innings at the bottom of the order, including a four and a six, which perhaps raised false hopes as to his batting ability. His top Test score of 29 off only 18 balls was scored in the 1994–1995 tour of Australia. It included three fours and two successive sixes off Shane Warne.

On the West Indies tour in 1989/90, Malcolm made a major impact, taking five wickets and running out Gordon Greenidge at Sabina Park in Jamaica as England won the First Test, their first victory against the West Indies in a test match for sixteen years. After an abandoned Second Test he then took ten wickets in the Third Test, and, with a total of nineteen scalps in four Tests, returned as England's leading wicket-taker of the trip. Although England narrowly lost that series, Malcolm was top wicket-taker again as he helped England to win their next series against New Zealand, taking two five-wicket hauls. Malcolm was man of the match as England secured a home Test series victory for the first time in five years.

That winter Malcolm joined England's tour of Australia and New Zealand. Although England lost the Ashes series heavily, Malcolm won some praise, the Wisden review of the tour observing: "Of the established players, other than Russell,... surprisingly it was Malcolm who made the biggest advance, despite his costly wickets ... he came back full of running for every spell, bowling with pace and heart, and he might well have won the Sydney Test if Gooch had given him an early chance to attack Rackemann". Malcolm also played as England won at Leeds the following summer in their first Test victory over the West Indies in England in 22 years, but his wickets had dried up and he was replaced by David Lawrence. After a horrific injury to Lawrence, Malcolm was recalled to the England side in 1992.

Malcolm continued to have intermittent success for England thereafter but struggled with inconsistency. For instance, after taking a five-wicket haul for England against Pakistan at The Oval in 1992, he was selected for a winter tour of India and Sri Lanka and included in the team for three of the four Tests. He struggled in spin-friendly conditions, and although he did take his best one-day international figures on this tour, England lost all of the Tests heavily, and he was dropped. Recalled for the final Test the following summer he took six wickets as England won their first Test against Australia since 1986. Steve Waugh, one of Malcolm's victims again on this occasion, and one of Australia's greatest Test cricketers, said in retrospect: "We were always amazed every time we played England and Devon Malcolm's name wasn't on the team sheet … He could bowl the quickest over you ever faced and then the worst over the next over, but as a batsman, that's not what you want – you want consistency when someone's bowling at you, so you could prepare for what's happening". However, the England selectors disagreed and Malcolm was soon dropped again.

On 20 August 1994, recalled to play for England against South Africa also at The Oval, Malcolm was hit on the helmet by a bouncer while batting at number 11 against bowler Fanie de Villiers. He was incensed by this, turning to the South African slip cordon and exclaiming the now famous words "You guys are history". South Africa's second innings was then destroyed by Malcolm in an outstanding and extremely hostile display of accurate fast bowling, taking nine wickets for only 57 runs, the ninth-best bowling figures in an innings in the entire history of Test cricket as of June 2025.

That winter Malcolm participated in the 1994-5 Ashes series, helping England to victory in the fourth test at Adelaide, taking seven wickets in the match and dismissing Waugh again. England however lost the series. Like most England players of his generation, Malcolm would never finish on the winning side in an Ashes series.

Malcolm sought and in October 1995 obtained legal redress when a July 1995 article appearing in the Wisden Cricket Monthly questioned the commitment of players of foreign origin to the England cricket team. According to subsequent recollection this recalled typecasting of Malcolm and Gladstone Small by politician Norman Tebbit after the 1990 victory at Sabina Park. Malcolm, along with an England and then Derbyshire colleague Phillip DeFreitas, issued writs for defamation; Malcolm accepted libel damages through the High Court while DeFreitas settled outside of court.

Malcolm's relationship with the then England team manager Ray Illingworth became strained and culminated in a row during the following series against South Africa in 1995–96. He was also reported to have had disagreements with England's then bowling coach, Peter Lever. Malcolm bowled poorly with the second new ball in the final Test, which allowed Dave Richardson and Paul Adams to add 73 for the last wicket. An insinuation that Malcolm had "no cricketing brain" has been cited as an instance of institutional racism in cricket.

Malcolm played his last Test for England against Australia in 1997, also at the Oval, the ground at which he achieved his best bowling figures in a Test innings.

== Beyond cricket ==
Malcolm runs DEM Sports, a company that sells cricket equipment to schools and clubs around the world.

He is Black Communities Events Organiser for the ECB, and was awarded his Freedom of the City of London in April 2023 in honour of his sporting achievements.
