= Nigel Ilott =

English cricketer

Nigel Ilott (born 22 August 1965) is a former English cricketer. He played as a right-handed batsman for Hertfordshire. He was born in Watford.

Ilott, who made his Minor Counties Championship debut for the team in the 1988 season, and who played with the team until 1994, made a single List A appearance for the team, during the 1993 season, against Gloucestershire. From the upper-middle order, he scored 14 runs.

Ilott's brother, Mark played Test cricket for England, while his father, John, umpired NatWest Trophy matches between 1999 and 2003.
