= Martin McCague =

Professional cricketer

Personal information
- Full name: Martin John McCague
- Born: 24 May 1969 (age 57); Larne, County Antrim, Northern Ireland
- Height: 191 cm (6 ft 3 in)
- Batting: Right-handed
- Bowling: Right-arm fast
- Role: Bowler

International information
- National side: England
- Test debut (cap 568): 1 July 1993 v Australia
- Last Test: 25 November 1994 v Australia

Domestic team information
- Years: Team
- 1990/91–1991/92: Western Australia
- 1991–2001: Kent
- 2002–2005: Herefordshire

Career statistics
| Competition | Test | FC | LA | T20 |
|---|---|---|---|---|
| Matches | 3 | 135 | 166 | 2 |
| Runs scored | 21 | 2,324 | 800 | 6 |
| Batting average | 4.20 | 16.48 | 11.94 | 6.00 |
| 100s/50s | 0/0 | 0/6 | 0/1 | 0/0 |
| Top score | 11 | 72 | 56 | 6 |
| Balls bowled | 593 | 22,924 | 6,971 | 0 |
| Wickets | 6 | 456 | 211 | – |
| Bowling average | 65.00 | 27.17 | 27.27 | – |
| 5 wickets in innings | 0 | 25 | 3 | – |
| 10 wickets in match | 0 | 2 | 0 | – |
| Best bowling | 4/121 | 9/86 | 5/26 | – |
| Catches/stumpings | 1/– | 75/– | 32/– | 0/– |
- Source: CricInfo, 17 January 2013

Martin John McCague (born 24 May 1969) is a former professional cricketer who played for the England cricket team in three Test matches in 1993 and 1994. McCague was born in Northern Ireland and grew up in Australia where he began his professional career.

== Career ==
His development as a cricketer started in Australia, where he grew up. He played first-class cricket for Kent County Cricket Club who, due to his Northern Ireland origins, were allowed to field both him and an overseas player.

His selection for England drew negative comments from some cricket commentators including John Woodcock since he had started his career in Australia. It was not just English fans who disliked this: during the 1994–95 Ashes in Australia, when he hailed a taxi, the Australian driver called him a traitor and refused to take him. He bowled well on debut, taking four wickets for 121 in the first innings of the 1993 Trent Bridge Test, but enjoyed less success in the next Test as Headingley, going wicketless as Australia scored 653 for four declared. An injured shoulder, later diagnosed as a stress fracture of the back, meant that he missed the final Test of the series.

McCague had considerable pace but lacked control. With his experience of first-class cricket in Australia, his selection for England's Ashes tour of 1994/5 was not as surprising as is sometimes suggested. He started the tour well, taking 5 for 31 as England beat South Australia. But after England lost in the first Test at Brisbane and suffering from a stress fracture of his shins, he played in no more of the first-class matches or any of the One Day Internationals.

In 1994 McCague took 15 for 147 in a championship match against Derbyshire, including career best innings figures of 9 for 86, on his way to 57 wickets that season at 19.01. The following year he took 21 wickets in helping Kent to win the Sunday League. He continued to play for Kent until 2001, albeit intermittently at times, and later played Minor Counties cricket for Herefordshire. He played two Twenty20 matches in 2005 for a PCA Masters team.

== Personal life ==
McCague played one first team game for semi-professional Australian rules football team North Adelaide in 1990.

He has two sons. According to Steve Marsh's autobiography, McCague consumed 72 pints of Guinness during his stag weekend in Dublin.
