= English cricket team in New Zealand in 1990–91 =

International cricket tour

England cricket team in New Zealand in 1990-91
	New Zealand	England
- Dates: 9 February – 16 February 1991
Captains	Martin Crowe	Graham Gooch

One Day International series
- Results: New Zealand won the 3-match series 2–1
Most runs	Andrew Jones (145)	Robin Smith (138)
Most wickets	Chris Pringle (9)	Angus Fraser (5); Martin Bicknell (5)

The England national cricket team toured New Zealand in February 1991 and played a three-match One Day International (ODI) series against the New Zealand national cricket team. New Zealand won the series 2–1. England were captained by Graham Gooch and New Zealand by Martin Crowe.

== One Day Internationals (ODIs) ==
New Zealand won the Bank of New Zealand Trophy 2–1.

=== 1st ODI ===
9 February 1991
Scorecard
Wisden report

England; 230/7 (50 overs)	v	New Zealand; 216/8 (50 overs)
RA Smith 65 (95); C Pringle 3/54 (10 overs)		KR Rutherford 77 (111); MP Bicknell 3/55 (10 overs)

England won by 14 runs
Lancaster Park, Christchurch
Umpires: BL Aldridge and RS Dunne
Player of the match: KR Rutherford (NZ)

- England won the toss and elected to bat.

=== 2nd ODI ===
13 February 1991
Scorecard
Wisden report

New Zealand; 196/8 (49 overs)	v	England; 187 (48 overs)
AH Jones 64 (91); ARC Fraser 3/22 (9 overs)		GA Gooch 41 (60); CZ Harris 3/33 (10 overs)

New Zealand won by 9 runs
Basin Reserve, Wellington
Umpires: GIJ Cowan and SJ Woodward
Player of the match: AH Jones (NZ)

- England won the toss and elected to field.
- The match was reduced from 50 to 49 overs per side.
- CL Cairns (NZ) made his ODI debut.

=== 3rd ODI ===
16 February 1991
Scorecard
Wisden report

New Zealand; 224/7 (50 overs)	v	England; 217 (49.5 overs)
AH Jones 64 (84); PAJ DeFreitas 2/51 (10 overs)		GA Gooch 47 (74); CL Cairns 4/55 (10 overs)

New Zealand won by 7 runs
Eden Park, Auckland
Umpires: RL McHarg and SJ Woodward
Player of the match: CZ Harris (NZ)

- England won the toss and elected to field.
