= Trevor Franklin (cricketer) =

New Zealand cricketer (born 1962)

Personal information
- Full name: Trevor John Franklin
- Born: 18 March 1962 (age 64); Auckland, New Zealand
- Batting: Right-handed
- Bowling: Right-arm medium
- Role: Batsman

International information
- National side: New Zealand (1983–1991)
- Test debut (cap 153): 25 August 1983 v England
- Last Test: 1 March 1991 v Sri Lanka
- ODI debut (cap 45): 17 March 1983 v Australia
- Last ODI: 10 December 1988 v India

Domestic team information
- Years: Team
- 1980/81–1992/93: Auckland

Career statistics
Competition	Test	ODI	FC	LA
Matches	21	3	148	61
Runs scored	828	27	7,794	1,392
Batting average	23.00	9.00	33.30	24.00
100s/50s	1/4	0/0	13/40	1/6
Top score	101	21	181	102
Balls bowled	0	0	91	54
Wickets	–	–	1	1
Bowling average	–	–	51.00	50.00
5 wickets in innings	–	–	0	0
10 wickets in match	–	–	0	0
Best bowling	–	–	1/21	1/23
Catches/stumpings	8/–	0/–	79/–	14/–
- Source: Cricinfo, 4 February 2017

Trevor John Franklin (born 18 March 1962) is a New Zealand former cricketer who played 21 Tests and three One Day Internationals for New Zealand. He played first-class cricket for Auckland from 1980 to 1993.

Franklin was known for his stoicism as a right-handed opening batsman. He scored his only Test century against England at Lord's in 1990, when he reached his century after 431 minutes and was out next ball. Over his Test career he had a meagre strike rate of 26.44. He was also known for strange injuries, including shattering his leg when he was run over by a motorised luggage trolley at Gatwick Airport in 1986 which kept him out of cricket for 18 months.
