= Mark Ilott =

English cricketer (born 1970)

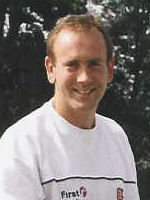
- Ilott in 2002

Personal information
- Full name: Mark Christopher Ilott
- Born: 27 August 1970 (age 56); Watford, Hertfordshire, England
- Batting: Left-handed
- Bowling: Left-arm medium-fast
- Role: Bowler

International information
- National side: England
- Test debut: 1 July 1993 v Australia
- Last Test: 26 December 1995 v South Africa

Domestic team information
- Years: Team
- 1988–2002: Essex

Career statistics
Competition	Test	FC	LA
Matches	5	192	185
Runs scored	28	2,830	797
Batting average	7.00	14.66	12.07
100s/50s	0/0	0/4	0/2
Top score	15	60	56*
Balls bowled	1,042	35,359	8,714
Wickets	12	633	232
Bowling average	45.16	27.70	26.39
5 wickets in innings	0	27	1
10 wickets in match	0	3	0
Best bowling	3/48	9/19	5/21
Catches/stumpings	0/–	54/–	31/–
- Source: CricInfo, 7 August 2018

Mark Christopher Ilott (born 27 August 1970) is a former English professional cricketer.

Having previously played with the minor county Hertfordshire, Ilott began his career with Essex in 1988. A left-arm swing bowler in the mould of John Lever, previously prolific with the county, Ilott took 64 wickets as Essex won the County Championship in 1992. Ilott played his first Test in the third match of the 1993 Ashes, a match in which England gave debuts to four players (most notably Graham Thorpe). Ilott was part of a four-man contingent from Essex in the team at this point, alongside Graham Gooch, Nasser Hussain and Peter Such. Ilott took four wickets in the match, but only four more in his next two Test matches. Although all England bowlers struggled at this time, none but Such taking more than his eight wickets in the series, Ilott was subsequently left out of the team. Ilott had an impressive 1995 season with Essex, taking 78 wickets, including remarkable career best first-class figures of 10.1-2-19-9 against Northamptonshire (in a match that Essex still lost). He was recalled to the England team for the tour to South Africa that winter, where Ilott took 3/48 in the third Test, yet was injured in the fourth Test.

Ilott took another fifty wickets in 1996. In 1997 he helped Essex to win the NatWest Trophy, although he was involved in what ESPNCricinfo calls "an unsavoury, but in truth pretty harmless, pushing and finger-wagging incident with Robert Croft" during the semi-final against Glamorgan. He also helped Essex to win the 1998 Benson & Hedges Cup, Ilott taking 3/10 in 8 overs in the final against Leicestershire. By now injuries were impeding Ilott and he was not recalled to play for England again.

Ilott enjoyed a 15-year first-class career with Essex. He was born at Watford in Hertfordshire. He studied at Francis Combe School and Community College. Ilott's brother, Nigel played cricket for Hertfordshire.

Following his cricket career, Ilott worked as a teacher at St Albans School, Hertfordshire and is Master in Charge of cricket.
