= Steve Watkin =

Welsh cricketer

Personal information
- Full name: Steven Llewellyn Watkin
- Born: 15 September 1964 (age 62); Maesteg, Glamorgan, Wales
- Batting: Right-handed
- Bowling: Right-arm medium-fast

Career statistics
Competition	Test	ODI	FC	LA
Matches	3	4	266	252
Runs scored	25	4	2,037	427
Batting average	5.00	2.00	10.83	6.37
100s/50s	0/0	0/0	0/1	0/0
Top score	13	2	51	31*
Balls bowled	534	221	52,035	12,424
Wickets	11	7	902	309
Bowling average	27.72	27.57	27.92	26.82
5 wickets in innings	0	0	31	1
10 wickets in match	0	0	4	0
Best bowling	4/65	4/49	8/59	5/23
Catches/stumpings	1/–	0/–	71/–	39/–
- Source: CricInfo, 4 October 2013

Steven Llewellyn Watkin (born 15 September 1964) is a former Welsh cricketer who played for Glamorgan County Cricket Club and the England cricket team. A reliable seam bowler who never suffered serious injury despite several lesser niggles, he played three Test matches in 1991 and 1993, and four One Day Internationals in 1993 and 1994. He was one of the Wisden Cricketers of the Year in 1994, the only one of that year's five who was not Australian.

== Life and career ==
Watkin made his first-class debut against Worcestershire in 1986, taking the wickets of Graeme Hick and Phil Neale, and also played two Sunday League games, but had to wait until 1988 for a second chance. That year he established himself as an important member of the Glamorgan first team, taking 8 for 59 (which was to remain his career best) against Warwickshire, and claiming 46 first-class scalps in all that season. His best year in terms of wickets was 1989, when he captured 94, and in his career he took a total of 902 wickets.

He made his England Test debut unexpectedly in 1991, when Chris Lewis pulled out on the morning of the first test against the West Indies. Watkin's bowling was ideal for Headingley's notorious seamer friendly conditions. Watkin took five wickets, including those of Carl Hooper, Viv Richards and Gus Logie in a match-turning spell in the second innings, in England's ultimate victory in the match, which was their first home victory in a Test against the West Indies for 22 years. But Watkin fared less well two weeks later at Lord's, where his only significant contribution was to hang around for nearly an hour with the bat while Robin Smith played the best innings of his career at the other end.

Watkin had a good season in 1993, the year after which he was recognised as one of the Wisden Cricketers of the Year, taking more first-class wickets than any other bowler (92 at 22.80), as Glamorgan finished third in the County Championship. He returned to the Test team for the Sixth Test in 1993, when he took six wickets, including the first three of Australia's second innings, in England's only victory of the series. This was also a landmark victory for England as they had not won any of their previous 18 Tests against Australia. He was selected for the subsequent tour of the West Indies, but did not play in any of the Tests: he perhaps would have held his place for the First Test, but suffered back trouble which put him out of the side, Alan Igglesden playing in his place. He did play in four of the five ODIs on that tour, bowling particularly creditably in the 2nd in Kingston, Jamaica, with four wickets on his comeback after missing the 1st Test: but a loss of form in the later ODIs and a subsequent recurrence of his back problem cut his tour short, the only time injury got the better of him in his career. He was not considered for international selection again, although some considered him unlucky in this regard.

Watkin made an important contribution in 1997 when Glamorgan won their first County Championship for 28 years, taking 61 wickets at 22.83 and forming an effective combination with the county's overseas player, Waqar Younis.

In 1998, Watkin was given a benefit by Glamorgan, which raised £133,000. Normally a poor batsman, he managed to average a startling 35.66 that year, despite a top score of just 25, thanks to 13 not outs in his sixteen innings. By contrast, his career average was 10.83. In 2000, he scored 51 against Gloucestershire, the only half-century of his career.

After retirement in 2001, Watkin became Director of the Welsh Cricket Academy.
