= Mike Gatting =

English cricketer (born 1957)

Mike Gatting OBE
Personal information
- Full name: Michael William Gatting
- Born: 6 June 1957 (age 69); Kingsbury, London
- Nickname: Gatt
- Batting: Right-handed
- Bowling: Right-arm medium
- Role: Batsman
- Relatives: Steve Gatting (brother); Joe Gatting (nephew)

International information
- National side: England (1977–1995)
- Test debut (cap 477): 18 January 1978 v Pakistan
- Last Test: 7 February 1995 v Australia
- ODI debut (cap 43): 23 December 1977 v Pakistan
- Last ODI: 20 March 1993 v Sri Lanka

Domestic team information
- Years: Team
- 1975–1998: Middlesex

Career statistics
Competition	Test	ODI	FC	LA
Matches	79	92	551	551
Runs scored	4,409	2,095	36,549	14,476
Batting average	35.55	29.50	49.52	33.74
100s/50s	10/21	1/9	94/181	12/87
Top score	207	115*	258	143*
Balls bowled	752	392	10,061	6,234
Wickets	4	10	158	175
Bowling average	79.25	33.60	29.76	27.52
5 wickets in innings	0	0	2	1
10 wickets in match	0	0	0	0
Best bowling	1/14	3/32	5/34	6/26
Catches/stumpings	59/–	22/–	493/–	177/–
Medal record
Men's Cricket
Representing England
ICC Cricket World Cup
Runner-up	1979 England
Runner-up	1987 India and Pakistan
- Source: ESPNcricinfo, 10 March 2017
- Gatting's voice recorded 2012, as part of an audio description of the Tower of London for VocalEyes

Michael William Gatting OBE (born 6 June 1957) is an English former cricketer, who played first-class cricket for Middlesex (1975–1998; captain 1983–1997) and for England from 1977 to 1995, captaining the national side in twenty-three Test matches between 1986 and 1988. He toured South Africa as captain of the rebel tour party in 1990. He was a part of the English squad which finished as runners-up at the 1979 Cricket World Cup and captain of the squad which finished as runners-up at the 1987 Cricket World Cup.

He replaced John Buchanan as the Middlesex coach, serving during 1999 and 2000.

He is currently an elected member of the Middlesex C.C.C. Executive Board and the Marylebone Cricket Club committee. He has previously served as the ECB managing director of Cricket Partnerships and president of the M.C.C.

Cricket writer Colin Bateman has stated that "talk of Gatting the batsman always evokes adjectives such as pugnacious, bold, brave and belligerent".

== Youth career ==
As a youngster, Gatting became first batsman to score a century on Youth ODI debut in 1976. He scored 126 runs in that innings against the West Indies U19's.

== Career ==
Before playing cricket professionally, Gatting used to play football for Watford reserves. As a fourteen-year-old goalkeeper on trial at Queen's Park Rangers, Gatting was told that he was too short and overweight to make the grade. Gatting also went on an unfruitful trial with fellow Londoners Arsenal F.C. That being so, he turned to cricket for his sporting future and QPR signed the other trialist that day, Phil Parkes.

In domestic cricket, Gatting was one of the most prolific batsmen in England for most of his career, but it took him several years to establish himself in the England team. He initially had great difficulty converting fifties into centuries at Test match level and he did not achieve a Test century until his fifty-fourth Test innings; he went on to accumulate ten hundreds in all. His highest Test score of 207 was scored in Madras. Graeme Fowler also scored a double century in the same innings; it remains the only occasion where two English batsmen scored double centuries in the same innings of a test match. Gatting later captained England to an Ashes series victory in Australia in 1986/87.

During a one-day match in 1986, Gatting's nose was shattered by a ferocious delivery from West Indies fast bowler Malcolm Marshall. Marshall later found shards of the nose embedded in the ball's leather. The incident set the tone for the series as the West Indies' fearsome pace attack spearheaded England's thrashing 5–0.

Another mishap for which Gatting will be remembered is being caught by Australian wicketkeeper Greg Dyer, after trying to play a reverse sweep off opposing captain Allan Border's first ball during the 1987 World Cup final.

In 1987, Gatting gained notoriety in the "Shakoor Rana affair" when he argued with umpire Shakoor Rana in Faisalabad. He was accused of adjusting the field illegally, i.e. after the bowler had started running in, and warned. In fact, Gatting had been signalling to the long leg fielder to stop walking in, and the move was legal as it was not in the batsman's eyeline. Rana shouted 'stop, stop' and signalled dead ball, however, infuriating Gatting. Tempers were already frayed following a string of umpiring decisions that had gone against England, and the England team were unhappy that Rana was wearing a Pakistan sweater under his jacket. An on-pitch argument ensued, during the course of which Rana accused Gatting of breaking the rules and Gatting shouted 'We made the rules'. He had to be dragged away by Bill Athey. Rana refused to resume the match the following morning until Gatting delivered a handwritten apology, which he did under protest – eventually, the match was drawn due to bad light. The England hierarchy supported him, flying officials out to mediate with the board and deal with press relations. The Pakistan board supported Rana, naming him umpire for the deciding Test, from which position they only backed down when it was clear the England team would not play if Rana officiated, naming two other umpires. Indeed, the TCCB subsequently paid all players in the England party a £1000 'hardship' bonus for the tour.

Martin Williamson, editor of Cricinfo, subsequently commented of the incident, 'Whatever the provocation, Gatting was in the wrong.' Gatting also reflected later that 'it wasn't a very proud moment of my career.' He also admitted that, whatever the official reason given, it was the real reason why he lost the England captaincy the following summer. However, it went a long way towards establishing the principle of neutral umpires to prevent blatant bias by home country umpires, which had not always been the case previously. Rana said he did it 'for umpires everywhere'.

Gatting was dismissed as England captain the following summer over an alleged encounter with a barmaid, triggering the "summer of four captains". He subsequently led a highly controversial rebel tour to South Africa. According to Searchlight, Gatting attracted media attention during the tour for describing a protest outside the rebel team's hotel as "a few people singing and dancing". The rebels received three-year international bans.

In June 1993, during England's first innings at Old Trafford, Gatting received Shane Warne's first delivery – now known as the "Ball of the Century" – in an Ashes match. Warne pitched the ball a foot outside leg stump and spun the ball past Gatting's bat to clip the off bail. Gatting's dismissal in the second innings was also unusual, in that he was bowled off the very last ball of the fourth day's play by Merv Hughes, meaning he was unable to help England bat out the last day. Australia went on to win during the last session on that last day.

Gatting's last Tests were played on tour in Australia in 1994/95. Graham Gooch and he were the only two members of the original touring party to be fit for all matches, although they were the two oldest in the squad. In the first innings of the Adelaide Test he scored his final century (117), a battling effort where he spent a lot of time in the nineties. His score helped England to their only win in the series.

Gatting was a useful right arm medium pace bowler. He averaged under thirty with the ball in both first-class and List A cricket, but he did not bowl with great frequency in International cricket. Perhaps his finest bowling performance was against South Africa during the final One Day International of the 1989/90 rebel England tour to South Africa where his 6/26 helped England to a comfortable 134-run victory.

Gatting was named as one of Wisden's five Cricketers of the Year in 1984. In 1987, he was awarded an OBE.

== Retirement ==
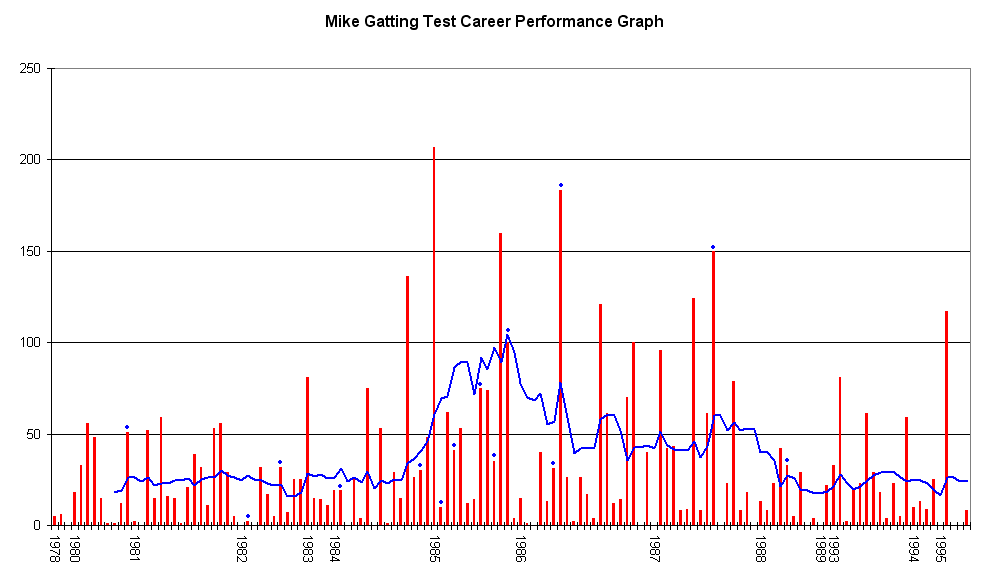
Mike Gatting's Test career batting performance graph

He retired from first-class cricket in 1998 and has since worked as a coach and commentator. He is also a past president of the Lord's Taverners for 2005–06 and the Marylebone Cricket Club (MCC) for 2013–14. He is currently in his second term as an elected member of the MCC committee and is also a co-opted member of the Middlesex C.C.C. Executive Board. Since October 2017 he has been the chairman of MCC's World Cricket committee.

Mike Gatting is not the only member of his family to have been a professional sportsman; his brother, Steve Gatting, was a professional footballer for Arsenal and Brighton & Hove Albion. Steve's son, Joe, played for Brighton & Hove Albion, having progressed from their youth scheme, and later played professional cricket for Sussex and Hampshire between 2009 and 2015.

He appeared as himself on The Archers on 9 September 2007 at the centre of a misunderstanding between Sid and Jolene Perks during the npower Village Cup Final at Lord's.

In May 2013, it was announced that he would be the President of Marylebone Cricket Club and helm it during bicentenary of Lord's and also Middlesex will celebrate the 150th anniversary of its formation.

Gatting Way, the road in Uxbridge that leads from Park Road to the Uxbridge Cricket Club Ground, of which Middlesex County Cricket Club are tenants, is named after Mike Gatting.

Sporting positions
Preceded by Mike Brearley	Middlesex County Cricket Captain; 1983–1997	Succeeded by Mark Ramprakash
Preceded by David Gower	English national cricket captain 1986–1988	Succeeded by John Emburey
