= John Emburey =

English cricketer (born 1952)

Personal information
- Full name: John Ernest Emburey
- Born: 20 August 1952 (age 74); Peckham, London
- Nickname: Embers, Ernie, Knuckle
- Height: 6 ft 2 in (1.88 m)
- Batting: Right-handed
- Bowling: Right arm off break
- Role: Bowler

International information
- National side: England (1978–1995)
- Test debut (cap 480): 24 August 1978 v New Zealand
- Last Test: 30 July 1995 v West Indies
- ODI debut (cap 52): 14 January 1980 v Australia
- Last ODI: 20 March 1993 v Sri Lanka

Domestic team information
- Years: Team
- 1973–1995: Middlesex
- 1982/83–1983/84: Western Province
- 1996–1997: Northamptonshire

Career statistics
Competition	Test	ODI	FC	LA
Matches	64	61	513	536
Runs scored	1,713	501	12,021	3,865
Batting average	22.53	14.31	23.38	15.77
100s/50s	0/10	0/0	7/55	0/2
Top score	75	34	133	50
Balls bowled	15,391	3,425	112,862	26,399
Wickets	147	76	1,608	647
Bowling average	38.40	30.86	26.09	25.98
5 wickets in innings	6	0	72	3
10 wickets in match	0	0	12	0
Best bowling	7/78	4/37	8/40	5/23
Catches/stumpings	34/–	19/–	458/–	181/–
Medal record
Men's Cricket
Representing England
ICC Cricket World Cup
Runner-up	1987 India and Pakistan
- Source: CricketArchive, 22 August 2007

John Ernest Emburey (born 20 August 1952) is a former English first-class cricketer who played for Middlesex, Northamptonshire, Western Province, Berkshire and England. He was a part of the English squad which finished as runners-up at the 1987 Cricket World Cup.

According to cricket writer Colin Bateman, Emburey's participation in two South African rebel tours "cost him six lost years as far as Test cricket was concerned ... and, more significantly, probably an extended run as England captain, a job for which he was better suited than some who held the position post-Mike Brearley".

== Playing career ==
Emburey was a right arm spin bowler and a slightly eccentric but useful lower-order batsman with the style of a grafter. He was more notable as an economical performer than a "demon" spin bowler, but on his day could leave the best batsmen groping outside off-stump. One of his dangerous balls was his arm ball outswinger. Emburey was named a Wisden Cricketer of the Year in 1984.

Emburey played an understated but significant role in England's storied victory in the Ashes in 1981, notably in the important fourth Test at Edgbaston, where he contributed runs and wickets as England took the lead in the series for the first time. According to the Wisden report on the match, while Ian Botham "was again named Man of the Match ... Emburey would have been the choice of many". In all Emburey featured in four Ashes series won by England, in 1978–9, 1981, 1985, and 1986-7 (as well as in two defeats in 1989 and 1993). He also played for England (on the losing side) in the 1987 Cricket World Cup final.

Emburey was briefly made England Test captain in 1988, the notorious "Summer of four captains". Mike Gatting was sacked after the first Test match against the West Indies and Emburey was appointed for two matches, both of which were lost. Emburey too was fired and was replaced by Chris Cowdrey for the fourth Test. Cowdrey lasted just one match, replaced in turn by Graham Gooch. While not a successful Test captain, Emburey had some successes captaining England in one-day international cricket, leading them to victory (in the absence of Gatting and Botham) in the Sharjah Cup in 1986–7.

Emburey was the only cricketer to go on both the England rebel tours to South Africa in 1981/2 and 1989/90; the rebels were banned from Test matches because of the apartheid régime, although it both cases Emburey was eventually restored to the England test team (respectively in 1985 and 1993). Emburey said of his decision to join the second rebel tour: "In hindsight it was a mistake. But at the time my decision was purely monetary. I'd lost my benefit money in a building society in Australia." According to Graham Gooch's published tour diary, Emburey had dressed up as a member of the Ku Klux Klan at a fancy dress party on tour just before the news of the first rebel tour broke.

Later in his Test career, Emburey tended to be picked for single Tests in England, as happened in 1993 against Australia, when statistically, he was the leading all rounder in the country, and 1995 against the West Indies. Broadly from 1987 his bowling was less effective in test cricket, although his batting became more successful; from February 1987 his Test wickets averaged almost twice as much as they had before.

At county level, Emburey's Middlesex career coincided with that of Phil Edmonds. The right and left arm spin combination was a powerful contribution towards Middlesex's successes in the 1980s. They also combined at England level, although the pair also sometimes competed for the same place in the Test team. A highlight of Emburey's Middlesex career was taking 12 wickets in a single day in a championship match at Lord's in 1980. He scored the winning runs from the last ball as Middlesex won the final of the NatWest Bank Trophy in 1984, and was man of the match when Middlesex won the Benson & Hedges Cup final in 1986 (in both cases defeating Kent). Between 1977 and 1993, the County won the County Championship outright five times, with one shared title in 1977.

Emburey holds the dubious distinction of being the highest England Test run-scorer never to have made a Test century. For a while, Emburey also held the batting record for the highest first-class innings made entirely from boundaries: Despite his chronic lack of footwork, he scored 46 for the England XI against Tasmania at Hobart in 1986–87, with ten fours and a six. This record was subsequently surpassed in 2006 by Mark Pettini.

Whilst not the most agile in the field, he seldom dropped anything, pulling off many a stunning catch, often at gully, and had an excellent arm in the deep.

== Coaching and other activities ==
Emburey coached the England A cricket team to a 3–0 win in India in 1995, and was considered for the position of manager for the senior side, but lost out to David Lloyd (whom he assisted for two test series in the West Indies and Zimbabwe). He subsequently coached Northamptonshire County Cricket Club from 1996 but was sacked in 1998 after a string of poor results. In 2001, he became coach for Middlesex County Cricket Club, but was sacked in 2008. In 2007, after Greg Chappell left his position as India head coach, Emburey was shortlisted for the job, but declined it. In February 2008, he signed on as the coach of the Ahmedabad Rockets, one of the expansion teams in the second season of the Indian Cricket League. As of May 2018, he works as a scout for the England and Wales Cricket Board.

== Personal life ==
Politically, Emburey is a Conservative, and once appeared on stage at a Conservative Party conference in the 1980s alongside England teammate Bill Athey.

In May 2014, he stated that he had skin cancer, attributing it to playing cricket without sunscreen or a hat.

He is married and has two daughters.

Sporting positions
Preceded by Mike Gatting	English national cricket captain 1988	Succeeded by Graham Gooch
Preceded by Harry Latchman	Middlesex President; 2017-2019	Succeeded by Mike Selvey
