= 2000 NatWest Triangular Series =

2000 NatWest Series
- Part of Zimbabwean cricket team in England in 2000; West Indian cricket team in England in 2000
- Date: 6–22 July 2000
- Location: England
- Result: England beat Zimbabwe in the final
- Player of the series: Alec Stewart (Eng)
Teams
| England | West Indies | Zimbabwe |
Captains
| Nasser Hussain | Jimmy Adams | Andy Flower |
Most runs
| Alec Stewart (408) | Brian Lara (204) | Alistair Campbell (257) |
Most wickets
| Craig White (11) | Franklyn Rose (8) | Heath Streak (10) |

The 2000 NatWest Series was a One Day International cricket tournament that took place in England between 6 and 22 July 2000. It was a tri-nation series involving England, West Indies and Zimbabwe. Ten matches were played in total, with each team playing one another thrice during the group stage, and the top two teams advancing to the finals. In the final, England defeated Zimbabwe at Lord's on 22 July 2000 by seven wickets to win the title.

== Background ==
The Zimbabwe team played in a two Test match series against England in May-June 2000, which was won by England. The West Indies was scheduled to play five tests against England in the Frank Worrell series between June and August 2000. In the midst of the test series between England West Indies, a tri-nation One Day International series involving the England, West Indies and Zimbabwe was scheduled, sponsored by the National Westminster Bank.

== Venues ==
Eight venues across England were used for the series with the final played at Lord's.

| City | Bristol | London | London | Canterbury | Manchester | Chester-le-Street | Birmingham | Nottingham |
|---|---|---|---|---|---|---|---|---|
| Venue | Bristol County Ground | The Oval | Lord's | St Lawrence Ground | Old Trafford | Riverside Ground | Edgbaston Cricket Ground | Trent Bridge |
| Capacity | 17,500 | 23,500 | 20,000 | 15,000 | 15,000 | 19,000 | 25,000 | 15,000 |

== Squads ==
Squads
| England | West Indies | Zimbabwe |
|---|---|---|
| Nasser Hussain (c); Andy Caddick; Robert Croft; Mark Ealham; Andrew Flintoff; Paul Franks; Darren Gough; Graeme Hick; Nick Knight; Matthew Maynard; Alan Mullally; Vikram Solanki; Alec Stewart, (wk); Graham Thorpe; Marcus Trescothick; Craig White | Jimmy Adams (c); Sherwin Campbell; Shivnarine Chanderpaul; Corey Collymore; Mervyn Dillon; Chris Gayle; Adrian Griffith; Wavell Hinds; Ridley Jacobs (wk); Reon King; Brian Lara; Nixon McLean; Mahendra Nagamootoo; Ricardo Powell; Franklyn Rose; Ramnaresh Sarwan; Courtney Walsh | Andy Flower (c), (wk); Heath Streak; Grant Flower; Alistair Campbell; Gary Brent; Stuart Carlisle; Murray Goodwin; Neil Johnson; Mpumelelo Mbangwa; Mluleki Nkala; Henry Olonga; Bryan Strang; Paul Strang; Dirk Viljoen; Guy Whittall; Craig Wishart |

== Fixtures ==
Ten matches were played in total, with each team playing one another thrice during the group stage, and the top two teams advancing to the finals.

=== Group stage ===
Zimbabwe topped the group stage with four wins from six matches. England finished in second place with seven points, and qualified for the finals to face Zimbabwe.

| Team | Played | Won | Lost | No Result | Points | NRR |
|---|---|---|---|---|---|---|
| Zimbabwe | 6 | 4 | 2 | 0 | 8 | -0.276 |
| England | 6 | 3 | 2 | 1 | 7 | 0.985 |
| West Indies | 6 | 1 | 4 | 1 | 3 | -0.700 |

Matches

In the group stage, Zimbabwe won its first three matches to top the table during the early fixtures. After its initial loss to Zimbabwe and a no result against West Indies, England came back to win its next three matches to be placed second. West Indies never really took off in the series, lost all its matches with Zimbabwe, and scored a lone victory in the last dead rubber against England.

6 July 2000 (D/N)
Scorecard

| West Indies; 232/7 (50 overs) | v | Zimbabwe; 233/4 (45 overs) |
| Brian Lara 60 (63); Grant Flower 2/27 (6 overs) | | Neil Johnson 95* (128); Franklyn Rose 2/50 (10 overs) |

Zimbabwe won by 6 wickets
Bristol County Ground, Bristol
Umpires: Peter Willey (Eng) and Jeremy Lloyds (Eng)
Player of the match: Neil Johnson (ZIM)

- West Indies won the toss and elected to bat.
- *Points: Zimbabwe 2, West Indies 0.

8 July 2000
Scorecard

| England; 207 (50 overs) | v | Zimbabwe; 210/5 (48.2 overs) |
| Marcus Trescothick 79 (102); Grant Flower 3/9 (3 overs) | | Alistair Campbell 80 (136); Andy Caddick 2/27 (10 overs) |

Zimbabwe won by 5 wickets
The Oval, London
Umpires: Ken Palmer (Eng) and David Shepherd (Eng)
Player of the match: Alistair Campbell (ZIM)

- England won the toss and elected to bat.
- Marcus Trescothick (ENG) made his ODI debut.
- Points: Zimbabwe 2, England 0.

9 July 2000
Scorecard

| England; 158/8 (43.5 overs) | v | West Indies |
| Marcus Trescothick 49 (79); Franklyn Rose 3/42 (9 overs) |

No result
Lord's, London
Umpires: Ken Palmer (Eng) and Ray Julian (Eng)

- West Indies won the toss and elected to field.
- *Points: England 1, West Indies 1.

11 July 2000
Scorecard

| Zimbabwe; 256/4 (50 overs) | v | West Indies; 186/8 (50 overs) |
| Guy Whittall 83 (111); Franklyn Rose 2/47 (10 overs) | | Nixon McLean 50* (70); Neil Johnson 2/16 (6 overs) |

Zimbabwe won by 70 runs
St Lawrence Ground, Canterbury
Umpires: Ray Julian (Eng) and Barry Dudleston (Eng)
Player of the match: Guy Whittall (ZIM)

- West Indies won the toss and elected to field.
- *Points: Zimbabwe 2, West Indies 0.

13 July 2000 (D/N)
Scorecard

| Zimbabwe; 114 (38.4 overs) | v | England; 115/2 (20.3 overs) |
| Andy Flower 28 (57); Marcus Trescothick 2/7 (1.4 overs) | | Andrew Flintoff 42* (45); Heath Streak 2/32 (6 overs) |

England won by 8 wickets
Old Trafford, Manchester
Umpires: George Sharp (Eng) and John Holder (Eng)
Player of the match: Andrew Flintoff (ENG)

- Zimbabwe won the toss and elected to bat.
- *Points: England 2, Zimbabwe 0.

15 July 2000
Scorecard

| West Indies; 169/8 (50 overs) | v | England; 171/0 (35.2 overs) |
| Brian Lara 54 (101); Alan Mullally 3/27 (10 overs) | | Marcus Trescothick 87* (107) |

England won by 10 wickets
Riverside Ground, Chester-le-Street
Umpires: George Sharp (Eng) and John Hampshire (Eng)
Player of the match: Marcus Trescothick (ENG)

- England won the toss and elected to field.
- *Points: England 2, West Indies 0.

16 July 2000
Scorecard

| West Indies; 287/5 (50 overs) | v | Zimbabwe; 290/4 (49.1 overs) |
| Sherwin Campbell 105 (137); Dirk Viljoen 3/75 (10 overs) | | Murray Goodwin 112* (137); Mervyn Dillon 2/52 (10 overs) |

Zimbabwe won by 6 wickets
Riverside Ground, Chester-le-Street
Umpires: John Holder (Eng) and John Hampshire (Eng)
Player of the match: Murray Goodwin (ZIM)

- West Indies won the toss and elected to bat.
- Mahendra Nagamootoo (WIN) made his ODI debut.
- Points: Zimbabwe 2, West Indies 0.

18 July 2000 (D/N)
Scorecard

| England; 262/8 (50 overs) | v | Zimbabwe; 210/9 (50 overs) |
| Alec Stewart 101 (144); Heath Streak 3/59 (10 overs) | | Alistair Campbell 60 (95); Craig White 3/34 (8 overs) |

England won by 52 runs
Edgbaston, Birmingham
Umpires: Mervyn Kitchen (Eng) and David Constant (Eng)
Player of the match: Alec Stewart (ENG)

- England won the toss and elected to bat.
- *Points: England 2, Zimbabwe 0.

20 July 2000
Scorecard

| West Indies; 195/9 (50 overs) | v | England; 192 (49.5 overs) |
| Chris Gayle 37 (71); Craig White 3/35 (10 overs) | | Alec Stewart 100* (147); Reon King 3/30 (10 overs) |

West Indies won by 3 runs
Trent Bridge, Nottingham
Umpires: Mervyn Kitchen (Eng) and Barrie Leadbeater (Eng)
Player of the match: Chris Gayle (WIN)

- England won the toss and elected to field.
- Ramnaresh Sarwan (WIN) and Paul Franks (Eng) made their ODI debuts.
- Points: West Indies 2, England 0.

=== Final ===
In the final held at Lord's on 22 July 2000, Zimbabwe won the toss and elected to bat first. Zimbabwe lost three quick wickets within the first few overs with Darren Gough taking two. After Andy Caddick bowled Neil Johnson, Andy and Grant Flower steadied the innings with Grant top scoring with 53 runs. Zimbabwe finished with a paltry total of 169 runs in the allocated 50 overs. While England lost two quick wickets in the chase, Alec Stewart and Graham Hick combined for a partnership of 134 runs to take England closer to victory. England won the match in the 46th over with six wickets to spare.

22 July 2000
Scorecard

| Zimbabwe; 169/7 (50 overs) | v | England; 170/4 (45.2 overs) |
| Grant Flower 53* (102); Darren Gough 3/20 (10 overs) | | Alec Stewart 97 (123); Heath Streak 3/30 (10 overs) |

England won by 6 wickets
Lord's Cricket Ground, London
Umpires: David Shepherd (Eng) and Peter Willey (Eng)
Player of the match: Alec Stewart (Eng)

- Zimbabwe won the toss and elected to bat.
- England won the 2000 NatWest Series.

Stewart was awarded the Man of the Match in the final and Man of the Series awards.
