= 2001 NatWest Series =

- Part of Pakistani cricket team in England in 2001; Australian cricket team in England in 2001
- Date: 7–23 June 2001
- Location: England
- Result: Australia beat Pakistan in the final
- Player of the series: Waqar Younis (Pak)
Teams
| England | Australia | Pakistan |
Captains
| Alec Stewart | Steve Waugh | Waqar Younis |
Most runs
| Marcus Trescothick (249) | Ricky Ponting (298) | Yousuf Youhana (263) |
Most wickets
| Darren Gough (10) | Shane Warne (10) | Waqar Younis (17) |

The 2001 NatWest Series was a One Day International cricket tri-series sponsored by the National Westminster Bank that took place in England between 7 and 23 June 2001. The series involved the national teams of England, Australia and Pakistan. Ten matches were played in total, with each team playing one another thrice during the group stage. The teams which finished in the top two positions following the group stages qualified for the final, which Australia won by defeating Pakistan at Lord's on 23 June by 9 wickets. Preceding the series, England played Pakistan in a two Test series, while following the series, 61st The Ashes series.

== Venues ==
| Nottingham | London | Birmingham | Leeds | Manchester | Cardiff | Bristol | Chester-le-Street |
|---|---|---|---|---|---|---|---|
| Trent Bridge; Capacity: 15,000 | The Oval; Capacity: 23,500 | Edgbaston Cricket Ground; Capacity: 25,000 | Headingley; Capacity: 17,500 | Old Trafford; Capacity: 15,000 | Sophia Gardens; Capacity: 15,643 | Bristol County Ground; Capacity: 17,500 | Riverside Ground; Capacity: 19,000 |

== Squads ==
| England | Australia | Pakistan |
|---|---|---|
| Alec Stewart (c), (wk); Marcus Trescothick; Ali Brown; Nick Knight; Michael Vaughan; Paul Collingwood; Ben Hollioake; Darren Gough; Dominic Cork; Andy Caddick; Matthew Hoggard; Owais Shah; Robert Croft; Mark Ealham; Alan Mullally | Steve Waugh (c); Matthew Hayden; Mark Waugh; Ricky Ponting; Adam Gilchrist (wk); Michael Bevan; Damien Martyn; Ian Harvey; Andrew Symonds; Jason Gillespie; Damien Fleming; Brett Lee; Shane Warne; Glenn McGrath | Waqar Younis (c); Saeed Anwar; Faisal Iqbal; Shahid Afridi; Saleem Elahi; Abdul Razzaq; Shoaib Malik; Inzamam-ul-Haq; Yousuf Youhana; Imran Nazir; Azhar Mahmood; Younis Khan; Wasim Akram; Rashid Latif (wk); Saqlain Mushtaq; Shoaib Akhtar |

Matthew Hoggard called up to the England Squad to cover for injured Andy Caddick.

== Fixtures ==
| Team | Pld | W | L | NR | Pts |
|---|---|---|---|---|---|
| Australia | 6 | 4 | 1 | 1 | 9 |
| Pakistan | 6 | 4 | 1 | 1 | 9 |
| England | 6 | 0 | 6 | 0 | 0 |

== Pool matches ==
=== 1st ODI ===
7 June 2001 (D/N)
Scorecard

| Pakistan; 273/6 (50 overs) | v | England; 165 (47.2 overs) |
| Saeed Anwar 77 (106); Dominic Cork 2/44 (10 overs) | | Nick Knight 59* (115); Shahid Afridi 3/15 (7.2 overs) |

Pakistan won by 108 runs
Edgbaston Cricket Ground, Birmingham
Umpires: Barry Dudleston (Eng) and John Hampshire (Eng)
Player of the match: Saeed Anwar (Pak)

- Pakistan won the toss and elected to bat.
- Paul Collingwood (Eng) made his ODI debut.
- Points: Pakistan 2, England 0.

=== 2nd ODI ===
9 June 2001
Scorecard

| Pakistan; 257 (49.5 overs) | v | Australia; 258/3 (45.4 overs) |
| Yousuf Youhana 91* (103); Shane Warne 3/52 (10 overs) | | Ricky Ponting 70 (68); Shoaib Akhtar 1/41 (5 overs) |

Australia won by 7 wickets
Sophia Gardens, Cardiff
Umpires: Alan Whitehead (Eng) and Peter Willey (Eng)
Player of the match: Ricky Ponting (Aus)

- Pakistan won the toss and elected to bat.
- Points: Australia 2, Pakistan 0.

=== 3rd ODI ===
10 June 2001
Scorecard

| England; 268/4 (50 overs) | v | Australia; 272/5 (49.3 overs) |
| Nick Knight 84 (116); Brett Lee 1/45 (10 overs) | | Ricky Ponting 102 (116); Darren Gough 2/44 (10 overs) |

Australia won by 5 wickets
The Royal & Sun Alliance County Ground, Bristol
Umpires: John Hampshire (Eng) and Ray Julian (Eng)
Player of the match: Ricky Ponting (Aus)

- England won the toss and elected to bat.
- Owais Shah (Eng) made his ODI debut.
- Points: Australia 2, England 0.

=== 4th ODI ===
12 June 2001
Scorecard

| England; 240 (50 overs) | v | Pakistan; 242/8 (50 overs) |
| Marcus Trescothick 137 (142); Waqar Younis 2/20 (10 overs) | | Yousuf Youhana 81 (119); Andy Caddick 2/37 (10 overs) |

Pakistan won by 2 runs
Lord's Cricket Ground, London
Umpires: Neil Mallender (Eng) and Ken Palmer (Eng)
Player of the match: Marcus Trescothick (Eng)

- England won the toss and elected to field.
- Points: Pakistan 2, England 0.

=== 5th ODI ===
14 June 2001 (D/N)
Scorecard

| Australia; 208/7 (48 overs) | v | England; 86 (32.4 overs) |
| Steve Waugh 64 (83); Alan Mullally 3/50 (20 overs) | | Dominic Cork 17 (18); Jason Gillespie 3/20 (9 overs) |

Australia won by 125 runs (D/L)
Old Trafford, Manchester
Umpires: John Holder (Eng) and Jeremy Lloyds (Eng)
Player of the match: Jason Gillespie (Aus)

- Australia won the toss and elected to bat.
- Points: Australia 2, England 0.

=== 6th ODI ===
16 June 2001
Scorecard

| Pakistan | v | Australia |

Match abandoned
Riverside Ground, Chester-le-Street
Umpires: Allan Jones (Eng) and David Shepherd (Eng)

- No toss.
- Points: Australia 1, Pakistan 1.

=== 7th ODI ===
17 June 2001
Scorecard

| England; 156 (45.2 overs) | v | Pakistan; 153/4 (39.5 overs) |
| Ben Hollioake 53 (66); Waqar Younis 7/36 (10 overs) | | Abdul Razzaq 75 (103); Dominic Cork 2/32 (5.5 overs) |

Pakistan awarded the match
Headingley Cricket Ground, Leeds
Umpires: John Holder (Eng) and Mervyn Kitchen (Eng)
Player of the match: Waqar Younis (Pak)

- Pakistan won the toss and elected to field.
- Waqar Younis became the third bowler in ODIs to claim seven wickets.
- Points: Pakistan 2, England 0.

=== 8th ODI ===
19 June 2001 (D/N)
Scorecard

| Pakistan; 290/9 (50 overs) | v | Australia; 254 (46.3 overs) |
| Saleem Elahi 79 (91); Brett Lee 2/41 (10 overs) | | Adam Gilchrist 70 (44); Waqar Younis 6/59 (8 overs) |

Pakistan won by 36 runs
Trent Bridge, Nottingham
Umpires: Neil Mallender (Eng) George Sharp (Eng)
Player of the match: Waqar Younis (Pak)

- Pakistan won the toss and elected to bat.
- Points: Pakistan 2, Australia 0.

=== 9th ODI ===
21 June 2001 (D/N)
Scorecard

| England; 176 (43.2 overs) | v | Australia; 177/2 (30.1 overs) |
| Nick Knight 48 (81); Brett Lee 3/63 (10 overs) | | Adam Gilchrist 80 (90); Robert Croft 1/21 (7 overs) |

Australia won by 8 wickets
Kennington Oval, London
Umpires: David Constant (Eng) George Sharp (Eng)
Player of the match: Ricky Ponting (Aus)

- England won the toss and elected to bat.
- Points: Australia 2, England 0.

== Final ==
=== 10th ODI ===
23 June 2001
Scorecard

| Pakistan; 152 (42.3 overs) | v | Australia; 156/1 (26.3 overs) |
| Saeed Anwar 27 (40); Shane Warne 3/56 (10 overs) | | Adam Gilchrist 76* (93) |

Australia won by 9 wickets
Lord's Cricket Ground, London
Umpires: David Shepherd (Eng) and Peter Willey (Eng)

- Pakistan won the toss and elected to bat.
- Australia won the 2001 NatWest Series.

== Statistics ==
| Most runs | | Most wickets | |
|---|---|---|---|
| (Australia) Ricky Ponting | 298 | (Pakistan) Waqar Younis | 17 |
| (Pakistan) Yousuf Youhana | 263 | (Australia) Shane Warne | 10 |
| (England) Marcus Trescothick | 249 | (Australia) Brett Lee | 10 |
| (Australia) Adam Gilchrist | 248 | (England) Darren Gough | 9 |
| (England) Nick Knight | 213 | (Australia) Glenn McGrath | 8 |
