= Graham Thorpe =

English cricketer (1969–2024)

Graham Thorpe MBE
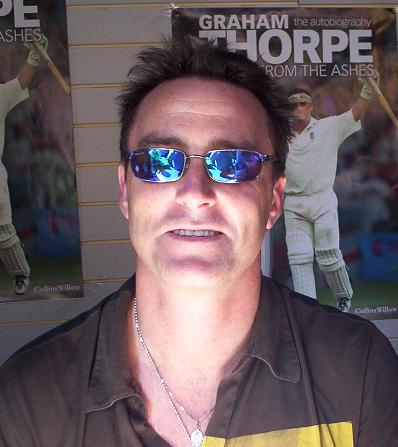
- Thorpe in 2005

Personal information
- Full name: Graham Paul Thorpe
- Born: 1 August 1969; Farnham, Surrey, England
- Died: 4 August 2024 (aged 55); Esher, Surrey, England
- Nickname: Thorpey
- Batting: Left-handed
- Bowling: Right arm medium
- Role: Middle-order batsman

International information
- National side: England (1993-2005)
- Test debut (cap 564): 1 July 1993 v Australia
- Last Test: 5 June 2005 v Bangladesh
- ODI debut (cap 122): 19 May 1993 v Australia
- Last ODI: 2 July 2002 v Sri Lanka
- ODI shirt no.: 9

Domestic team information
- Years: Team
- 1988–2005: Surrey

Career statistics
Competition	Test	ODI	FC	LA
Matches	100	82	341	354
Runs scored	6,744	2,380	21,937	10,871
Batting average	44.66	37.18	45.04	39.67
100s/50s	16/39	0/21	49/122	9/80
Top score	200*	89	223*	145*
Balls bowled	138	120	2,387	721
Wickets	0	2	26	16
Bowling average	–	48.50	53.00	40.56
5 wickets in innings	–	0	0	0
10 wickets in match	–	0	0	0
Best bowling	–	2/15	4/40	3/21
Catches/stumpings	105/–	42/–	290/–	168/–
- Source: CricInfo, 29 November 2007

Graham Paul Thorpe (1 August 1969 – 4 August 2024) was an English cricketer who played first-class cricket for Surrey and represented England in 100 Test matches. He also played 82 One Day Internationals (ODIs) including appearances at the 1996 and 1999 World Cups and deputised as captain on three occasions.

A left-handed middle-order batsman, Thorpe made his first-class debut for Surrey in 1988, becoming a regular in their side the following season. Following four winters of England A tours he made his full international debut in 1993, scoring a century on his Test debut against Australia. He was briefly dropped in 1994 but became an England regular through consistent scoring, although he struggled for a time to convert half-centuries into three-figure scores. After beginning 1997 with back-to-back centuries he was England's leading scorer and player of the Ashes series, which led to his selection as a Wisden Cricketer of the Year. After 10 seasons of touring he opted out of the South Africa series at the turn of the millennium, before returning refreshed to play some of his best cricket as England won a subcontinent series against Pakistan and Sri Lanka in 2000–01.

In early 2002, Thorpe scored the then third fastest double century in Test history as he made his highest Test score of 200 not out against New Zealand. The innings came at a time when his marriage was breaking down, and this led him to first retire from ODIs before taking a break from cricket entirely. He returned for England after over a year out, scoring a century at his home ground, The Oval. He was a member of the England side that won a national record eight successive Tests in 2004, and the following year made his 100th Test appearance. Thorpe retired from playing in 2005 after non-selection for the Ashes and took up coaching positions with New South Wales, Surrey and England. He died by suicide in August 2024, aged 55.

== Early life ==
Graham Thorpe was born in Farnham on 1 August 1969, the third of three boys to Geoff and Toni Thorpe. Graham's brothers are Ian, four years older, and Alan, two years older. Geoff Thorpe worked as a draughtsman and then as an engineering surveyor.

Thorpe first played men's cricket for village team Wrecclesham aged 13, moving on to play alongside his brothers at Farnham in the Surrey Championship. The whole family had a long association with the club, Ian and Alan would go on to be captain while Geoff served as chairman and Toni acted as scorer.

Thorpe was also a promising footballer: he represented England Schools at under-18 level as a midfielder and had a trial at Brentford. He was educated at Weydon School and Farnham College, but did not complete his A-Levels and was unsure what he would do for a career until offered a two-year contract by Surrey.

== Cricket career ==
=== Early career ===
Thorpe made his first-class debut aged 18 for Surrey against Leicestershire in June 1988. Batting at number eight he made scores of 15 and 16 and also claimed two wickets, his first wicket being that of David Gower lbw. Just a few days later Thorpe scored his maiden first-class century against Cambridge University, his unbeaten century taking 122 minutes. He made two further first-team appearances that season, scoring 19 against Derbyshire in the County Championship and 15 on his List A debut against Glamorgan. He established himself in the Surrey team in 1989, scoring his maiden Championship century at Basingstoke against a Hampshire attack featuring Malcolm Marshall. He surpassed 1,000 runs for the season at an average of 45, which led to selection for England A on their tour of Zimbabwe in 1989–90. He would go on three further tours with England A.

The 1990 season broke records for high scoring, however Thorpe struggled with an average of 27 and made just three half-centuries from 18 matches, he ended the campaign playing for the second XI. The following season was more successful, he scored his maiden List A century against Lancashire when opening the batting. Towards the end of the season he had a spell of three centuries in five County Championship innings. He also top scored with 93 in the Natwest Trophy final although Surrey lost by four wickets to Hampshire. He was awarded his county cap on 12 September 1991.

Thorpe had his most productive season of his career in 1992, amassing 1,895 runs at an average of 51.21. He was a consistent scorer recording fifties in the County Championship 13 times before finally passing three figures on 31 August. He converted the innings against Somerset into a maiden double century and shared in a stand of 211 from 34 overs with Ali Brown.

=== 1993 ===
In May 1993, Thorpe received his first senior international call-up as part of a 13-man squad for the Texaco Trophy, a three-match ODI series against the touring Australians. On 19 May, he made his ODI debut at Old Trafford in the first match of the series. During Australia's innings he took a catch off the bowling of fellow ODI debutant Andy Caddick and in England's run chase Thorpe, batting at number 6, made 31 in a four-run defeat, Wisden considered it "an intelligent innings in difficult circumstances". He added scores of 36 and 22 in the rest of the series. In Australia's tour match with Surrey which followed, Thorpe took his career best bowling figures of 4/40.

Thorpe was not selected for the first two Ashes Tests but the selectors made wholesale changes after an innings defeat in the second Test at Lord's including calling up Thorpe despite him being viewed as 'out of form' with a season average of 25. On 1 July, Thorpe made his Test debut against Australia at Trent Bridge alongside three other debutants (Mark Ilott, Martin McCague and Mark Lathwell). Thorpe scored 6 in the first innings before being caught at gully off a short ball from Merv Hughes. In England's second innings, Thorpe came to the wicket at 159/5 and shared in a 150-run sixth wicket partnership with captain Graham Gooch, Thorpe ended the fourth day on 88 not out and completed his century on the final morning, finishing unbeaten on 114 as Gooch declared. The Test match was drawn with Thorpe named as man of the match. By scoring a century on Test debut he became the 14th England player to achieve the feat and the first since Frank Hayes in 1973. Thorpe made a half-century in the fifth Test at Edgbaston but missed the final Test at The Oval after breaking his left thumb in a net session on the first morning of the match. He ended the series with an average of 46 and was one of only two England players to reach a hundred in the series, his partnership with Gooch at Trent Bridge was England's longest of the series.

=== 1994 ===
Thorpe was selected for England's tour of the West Indies in early 1994 and played all five Tests. He top-scored in the third Test at Queen's Park Oval with 86 before England collapsed to 46 all out in their second innings. In the fourth Test at Kensington Oval he scored 84, adding 150 in partnership with Surrey team-mate Alec Stewart, as England won their only Test of the tour. Thorpe averaged 26.55 across the series, with Wisden assessing: "Among the fringe batsmen Graham Thorpe made much the most progress, though he, too, had to cure technical problems before batting with authority late in the tour."

Thorpe was dropped for the home series with New Zealand in 1994, new chairman of selectors Ray Illingworth made wholesale changes with only six of the West Indies touring squad retained and opted for just five specialist batsmen with a five-man bowling attack including all-rounder Craig White. While back playing for Surrey, Thorpe made the highest List A score of his career against Lancashire in the NatWest Trophy, the innings of 145 not out coming from 135 deliveries. He shared a 180-run partnership with David Ward which set a county record for the competition and Surrey's total of 343 was also their highest in one-day cricket at the time.

Later that summer Thorpe was recalled by England for the second Test of the series against South Africa at Headingley, taking the place of an injured White. Thorpe, batting at number four, scored 72 from 112 balls including 13 boundaries during England's first innings, Wisden picked out "his urgency, instinctive placement and crisp driving". He added 73 in the second innings and 79 in the final Test at The Oval to end the series with an average of 79.66. In his series summary, Scyld Berry praised Thorpe's attacking play for enlivening England who prior to his introduction had taken a defensive approach to their batting. In the ODI series with South Africa that followed the Tests, Thorpe scored his maiden ODI half-century.

Thorpe was selected for the 1994–95 Ashes tour and played in all five Tests as Australia won the series 3–1. He contributed three fifties in the first four Tests including 83 in England's solitary victory at Adelaide. In the fifth Test at Perth he scored his second Test century with an innings of 123 from 218 balls including 19 fours. His partnership of 158 with Mark Ramprakash recovered England's first innings from 77/4 but after Thorpe was dismissed, stumped off a Shane Warne top-spinner, they collapsed going on to lose the match by 329 runs. Thorpe was England's leading run-scorer across the series with 444 runs at an average of 49.33. Wisden assessed that: "Thorpe appeared to have the temperament, as well as the technique, to be a fixture in the team for several years." In the 1994–95 Australian Tri-Series scheduled during the Ashes series, he made his highest ODI score of 89 against Zimbabwe at The Gabba however after batting for 155 minutes in 90 °F heat he was taken to hospital with dehydration and heat exhaustion.

=== 1995 ===
Thorpe continued his consistent scoring into the 1995 home series with West Indies, two fifties in the first two Tests extended his sequence of half-centuries to nine in nine Tests since being recalled the previous summer. During the second innings of the second Test, he was struck first ball by an unintentional beamer from Courtney Walsh and spent the night at St Mary's Hospital but returned the following day to make 42. Thorpe's highest score of the series, 94, came in the fourth Test at Old Trafford where England won by six wickets to level the series at 2–2. Two further fifties saw him end the six-match series as England's leading run-scorer with 506 at 42.16. He became the first England player to surpass 500 runs against the West Indies in a home series.

During the tour to South Africa in 1995–96, Thorpe struggled across the Test series making a total of 184 runs at 26.28. His highest score, and only half-century, came in the deciding Test at Newlands where he was dismissed run out for 59 in controversial fashion. The umpire Dave Orchard had originally adjudged him to be not out before South African captain Hansie Cronje persuaded Orchard to get the third umpire to check the TV replays which did show Thorpe to be out. Cronje was fined half his match fee for dissent but England went on lose the match and with it the series. Thorpe had a better ODI series, scoring three half-centuries from six matches and was England's highest scorer.

Thorpe was selected for the 1996 World Cup and played in all six of England's matches. During the group game with Netherlands, he scored 89 from 82 balls, equalling his highest ODI score. He also contributed an unbeaten half-century against Pakistan. In what was a disappointing tournament for England, beaten by all four Test-playing nations they played, he was their leading scorer with 254 at an average of 63.50.

=== 1996 ===
England began the 1996 season with an ODI series against India, Thorpe was named man of the match in the second ODI at Headingley as he led England to a six-wicket victory with an unbeaten 79. In the following match at Old Trafford, Thorpe took the wickets of Vikram Rathour and Sourav Ganguly, these would be his only wickets at international level. Across the subsequent Test series with India, Thorpe scored 193 runs at 48.25 with a highest score of 89.

Pakistan were the second touring side of the summer with the Test series starting at Lord's. In England's first innings Thorpe top scored with 77, however there was criticism of his increasing failure to convert his innings into centuries this being his 19th score of more than 50 in Test cricket of which only twice he had reached a hundred. England lost the Lord's Test and again at the Oval where Thorpe had added another fifty to end the Test series with 159 runs at 31.80.

In county cricket, Thorpe had a strong season with six centuries, including five in his nine County Championship matches. He was the first English player to pass 1,000 runs for the season, and ended the campaign with an average of 62.76 in all first-class cricket. He also made seven appearances for Surrey as they won the Sunday League, the county's first trophy in 14 years.

England toured Zimbabwe at the end of 1996 to play their first Test series against the nation. Thorpe was in poor form on the tour with Wisden describing him in the first Test as "horribly out-of-touch". He was able to score 50 not out in the second Test before final day rain cut the match short.

=== 1997 ===
At the end of the Zimbabwe tour in 1996–97, England travelled on to New Zealand. In the first Test at Auckland, Thorpe was struck by a bouncer from Chris Cairns and had been at fault for a run out of John Crawley before going on to make 119, ending his wait for a third Test century. He made it consecutive hundreds at Wellington as he scored 108, sharing century partnerships with Nasser Hussain and Crawley in the process.

Australia toured England in 1997 and ahead of the Ashes played three ODIs. England won all three matches with six wickets being the margin of victory on each occasion, Thorpe was unbeaten in the first and third match run chases with scores of 75 and 45.

The first Test of the Ashes took place at Edgbaston, England dismissed Australia for 118 and were 50/3 in reply when Thorpe joined Hussain at the crease. The pair batted through to the close adding 150 in 169 minutes with Wisden stating that Thorpe's "cutting and sweeping of Warne were crucial in seizing the initiative". On the second morning Thorpe reached his third Test century in four Tests as the stand contributed a further 135 in the pre-lunch session. He was dismissed to Glenn McGrath's first ball after lunch for 138, a Test best score at the time. The partnership of 288 with Hussain was the highest for England against Australia for the fourth wicket. England won the match by nine wickets but Australia fought back by dismissing England for 77 in the drawn second Test and winning the third comfortably.

In the fourth Test at Headingley, Australia were 50/3 in their first innings when Thorpe dropped a routine first slip catch from Matthew Elliott off the bowling of debutant Mike Smith. Smith would never take a Test wicket while Elliott, who was on 29 at the time, would go on to score 199 as Australia won the match by an innings. Having failed to pass 30 in six innings since the first Test there were calls for Thorpe to lose his place in the team, but he was retained by the selectors. In the fifth Test he scored 53 and 82 not out, the latter innings played as wickets were falling at the other end with six of his partners contributing just 14 whilst he added 68. Australia won the series by winning the match but England were victorious the sixth Test at The Oval. In a low-scoring match, Thorpe made the only half-century of the game with Wisden describing it as "an innings of exceptional quality and tenacity". He ended the series as England's top run-scorer with 453 at 50.33, and was chosen as their player of the series.

Thorpe ended the season with a double-century for Surrey against County Championship leaders Glamorgan, batting for 438 minutes in making a then career best score of 222. Earlier in the campaign he featured in Surrey's Benson & Hedges Cup victory over Kent. For his performances during the 1997 English cricket season he was selected as one of the Wisden Cricketers of the Year in its 1998 edition of the Almanack.

In December 1997, England won a four-team ODI tournament in Sharjah, Thorpe was named man of the match in the final after he scored an unbeaten 66 to guide England to a three-wicket victory over the West Indies.

=== 1998 ===
England's tour of West Indies in early 1998 began dramatically as the first Test was abandoned after an hour due to a dangerous pitch. The uneven bounce led to several batsmen being struck including Thorpe who was hit twice during his 10-ball innings, play was ended after the second such blow. The West Indies won two of the next three Tests with Thorpe only managing 111 runs across those matches.

On the first day of the fifth Test, he retired hurt at lunch due to back spasms with England at 55/4. After a painkilling injection he was able to return to the crease at the fall of the next wicket and batting alongside Mark Ramprakash ended the day unbeaten on 50. The following day Thorpe reached his sixth Test century, dismissed for 103 having batted for 395 minutes and shared in a 205-run sixth wicket partnership with Ramprakash. In setting up a second innings declaration Thorpe added 36 off 35 balls which included three pulled fours in a single Curtly Ambrose over, however final day rain denied England a chance of squaring the series. He was reprimanded for dissent by the match referee in the final Test following his first innings dismissal. Thorpe remained at the wicket for too long on being given out lbw, replays did show Thorpe had got an inside edge on the ball. In the second innings and facing a large deficit, Thorpe and Hussain put on a partnership of 168 in attempting to draw the match, however the run out of Hussain prompted a collapse of seven wickets for 26 runs as England succumbed to an innings defeat. Thorpe was left 84 not out having faced 322 balls. His series tally was 339 runs at 42.37. Thorpe played in the first game of the subsequent ODI series before returning home early from the tour due to the back injury sustained in the fifth Test.

Thorpe was named in England's ODI squad for the home series with South Africa but suffered a reoccurrence of the back injury in a practise session and missed all three matches. To prove his fitness ahead of the Test series he played a County Championship match against Kent and took six catches in their first innings, one short of the first-class record for a fielder. Across the first two Tests he scored 63 runs, before his back injury flared up during the Old Trafford Test. He was moved down the order to number eight in the first innings but managed only a six-ball duck. He lasted just three balls in the second innings as he completed the only pair of his Test career. The injury meant he was not selected for the fourth Test bringing an end to his run of 44 consecutive Test appearances. After an operation to remove a cyst from his lower back, he returned to cricket for Surrey's final match of the season against Leicestershire.

Thorpe was included in England's 17-man squad for the 1998–99 Ashes series. He began the tour well by scoring a career-best 223 not out in a warm-up match against South Australia, putting together an unbroken partnership of 377 with Ramprakash which broke the record for highest stand by an overseas team in Australia. In the first Test he scored 77 but his back problem resurfaced and he missed the second Test. He suffered more back pain while batting in the tour game against Victoria which forced an end to his tour.

=== 1999 ===
Thorpe was selected in the squad for the 1999 World Cup staged in England and proved his fitness in the build-up by scoring two ODI fifties in two days during the Sharjah triangular tournament. Despite home advantage at the World Cup England failed to progress out of the group stage. Thorpe top scored in their win over Zimbabwe, however defeat to South Africa and other results meant they had to beat India to progress. In the decisive match Thorpe scored 36 before receiving a contentious lbw decision from Javed Akhtar, England going on to lose by 63 runs.

Thorpe returned to the Test team for the four-match series with New Zealand. At the end of the first Test he was jeered by the crowd and received criticism for denying nightwatchman Alex Tudor the chance to score a century. Tudor was on 84 as Thorpe arrived at the crease but by outscoring him Tudor was left 99 not out when England reached their target. During the second Test, captain Hussain broke a finger while fielding and left Thorpe to deputise in his place. England lost the match convincingly by nine wickets after which Mark Butcher was chosen as stand-in captain for the next Test. Thorpe finished the series with 147 runs at 24.50, his highest score of 44 came in the defeat at The Oval which saw England lose the series and drop to the bottom of the Wisden World Championship.

In a difficult international summer, Thorpe did enjoy success with Surrey, making nine appearances as they won the County Championship title for the first time since 1971.

Thorpe opted out of the winter tour of South Africa citing family reasons having been on England tours, including those with England A, for the previous 10 years.

=== 2000 ===
After missing the South Africa series Thorpe was omitted from the first set of central contracts awarded by the ECB for the 2000 English summer. Thorpe struggled for form at the start of the season while playing for Surrey, making 112 runs in nine innings before scoring a century against Somerset in mid-June. He was recalled by England firstly for the ODI squad to play in the Triangular Series and following that to the Test squad for the third match of the West Indies series. His return to Test cricket after 11 months began inauspiciously as he was dismissed lbw from the first delivery he faced, a slower ball from Courtney Walsh that Thorpe lost sight of and ducked into. He contributed scores of 46 and 40 as England won the next two Tests, the latter innings was again ended by a Walsh slower ball.

The tour of Pakistan in late 2000 began with England successfully chasing over 300 in an ODI for the first time as they won their opening match, Thorpe scored an unbeaten 64 in putting on 138 in 17 overs with Andrew Flintoff. In the first Test at Lahore, Thorpe batted for over seven hours to score 118, the innings contained just two boundaries and only one of which was struck before he reached a hundred making it the record for fewest boundaries in a Test century. He added 166 in partnership with Craig White, breaking a sixth-wicket record for England-Pakistan contests. The match was drawn as was the second Test where Thorpe's stay at the crease lasted 323 minutes as he made 79. A collapse from the hosts in the third Test at Karachi left England a target of 176 in 44 overs, Thorpe scored an unbeaten 64 to see them to victory, completing the run chase in near darkness due to Pakistan's slow over-rate. His series aggregate was 284 runs at 56.80, Wisden praised his performance picking out his "judgment of line and length, limitless patience and mental strength".

=== 2001 ===
England's second tour of the winter took them to Sri Lanka where the hosts dominated the first Test winning by an innings. Thorpe made contributions of 59 and 46 as England won the second Test in a match overshadowed by poor umpiring decisions. In the deciding Test at Colombo, Thorpe held England's first innings together scoring 113 not out from a total of 249 with the next highest score being 26, although he was fortunate to survive a bat-pad catch that was given not out when on 73. On a dramatic third day, 22 wickets fell including Sri Lanka bowled out for 81. In pursuit of a small target of 74 the tourists lost six wickets but a calm 32 from Thorpe completed the victory. He ended the series as leading run-scorer with a tally of 269 runs at an average of 67.25. Captain Nasser Hussain left the tour with a thigh injury after the Tests and Thorpe was chosen as acting captain for the ODI series, Sri Lanka won all three matches convincingly including inflicting a first ever 10-wicket ODI defeat on England in the last game.

In the two-Test home series with Pakistan, Thorpe scored 80 during England's innings victory at Lord's in the first Test. In the second Test at Old Trafford, Thorpe made his ninth Test century going on to equal his Test best score of 138. He and Michael Vaughan came together at 15/2 in response to Pakistan's 403 before sharing a partnership of 267 which was a record for England against Pakistan. Thorpe's dismissal brought collapses in both innings with Pakistan taking eight wickets in the final session to win the match. His 228 runs in three innings saw him named as England's player of the series.

Thorpe sustained a calf injury in the warm-up before the opening match of the Natwest Series, the issue caused him to miss the whole ODI tournament as well as the first Test of the Ashes series. He returned to the team for the second Test but suffered another injury setback after being struck by a bouncer from Brett Lee which broke a bone in his right hand. He failed to play in the remainder of the series which Australia won 4–1.

Thorpe was selected for England's tour of India in 2001–02 and played in the first Test at Mohali, scoring 23 and 62. He flew home before the second Test for 'personal reasons', but did return to India for the ODI leg of the tour in January 2002.

=== 2002 ===
Following the India series England's moved on to New Zealand, beginning their tour with a five-match ODI series. Thorpe scored half-centuries in the third and fourth ODIs with England winning both matches. The first Test match was played at Lancaster Park on a drop-in pitch which got better for batting as the match went on. In England's second innings they were 106/5 when Thorpe, having already been dropped by Nathan Astle off his second ball, was joined by Andrew Flintoff. The pair put on a partnership of 281 in 312 balls, surpassing the English record for the sixth-wicket in the process. Thorpe reached his maiden Test double century from 231 balls, at the time the third fastest in Tests, his innings contained 28 fours and four sixes. Set an implausible target of 550, Astle scored the fastest double-century in Test history which briefly threatened a New Zealand win. Thorpe made 57 runs in the next two Tests which were overshadowed by news of Ben Hollioake's death, a Surrey and England team-mate of Thorpe.

Sri Lanka toured England in the first part of the 2002 English season to play a three-Test series. In the second Test at Edgbaston, Thorpe reached his 11th Test century thanks to support from number 11 Matthew Hoggard. Thorpe was on 61 when the ninth wicket fell but was able to more than double his score with the stand of 91 being a tenth wicket record for England-Sri Lanka matches. He also passed 5,000 Test runs during the innings, the 14th Englishman to reach the landmark.

Thorpe played in England's first three ODIs of the NatWest Series before being omitted from the rest of their matches. At the end of the tournament he announced his retirement from ODI cricket to focus on Test cricket citing the fitness demands of playing in both formats as well as wanting to spend more time with his children. In the first Test against India, Thorpe struggled scoring five runs in two innings with Wisden describing him as 'visibly distressed'. At the conclusion of the match he announced that he was taking a break from cricket stating: "I am feeling very worn down and burnt out by events off the field which have become a major distraction for me and prevented me from focusing fully on my cricket."

Thorpe returned to cricket seven weeks later for Surrey in a County Championship fixture with Hampshire, scoring a second innings century. He was originally named in England's squad for the 2002–03 Ashes after making himself available for selection but reversed his decision two weeks later and withdrew from the tour.

=== 2003 ===
During the 2003 English season, Thorpe played for Surrey for most of the campaign and helped them to win the double of National League and Twenty20 Cup. He made 13 appearances in the National League and averaged 47.25, and featured in five matches during the inaugural season of the Twenty20 Cup including the opening night win over Middlesex as well as the victory over Warwickshire in the final.

Thorpe was recalled by England for the final Test of the summer with England trailing South Africa 2–1 in the series, he replaced an injured Nasser Hussain. In response to South Africa's 484, Thorpe joined Marcus Trescothick at the wicket with England 78/2 and the pair batted together for five hours in adding 268. This was the fourth occasion of Thorpe being involved in a Test partnership of more than 250 and his innings of 126 was his first century for England at The Oval. England would go on to win the match and draw the series.

The Oval century ensured Thorpe's place in the squad for the tours of Bangladesh and Sri Lanka. In Bangladesh he scored two half-centuries as England won both Tests. However on the Sri Lankan leg of the tour he struggled against Muttiah Muralitharan's doosra and was dismissed by him five times, across the three Tests he scored 183 runs at 30.50.

=== 2004 ===
Thorpe was selected for his third tour of the West Indies in 2004 for a four-Test series. In the second Test, he top-scored with an innings of 90 with Wisden commenting that "he pulled and hooked majestically". He followed that by scoring his 13th Test century in the next Test at the Kensington Oval under tough circumstances. England lost wickets regularly in their first innings but Thorpe remained, and with support from the tail was able to reach three figures and put his side into a narrow lead. His unbeaten score of 119 was more than half the team total of 226 with the next highest contribution being 17. He was named man of the match as England won the Test to secure a first series victory in the Caribbean since 1968. In the final Test, Brian Lara scored 400 not out to break the record for highest score in Test cricket for a second time in his career, Thorpe witnessed both innings having also been in the opposition during his score of 375 in 1994. Thorpe ended the series with 274 runs at an average of 91.33.

In the home series with New Zealand, Thorpe twice helped England to successful fourth innings run chases of more than 280. At Lord's he made a half-century in an unbroken stand of 139 alongside Nasser Hussain who scored a century in his final Test innings. In the third Test at Trent Bridge, Thorpe arrived at the wicket with England 46/3 in pursuit of 284 before making his 14th Test century which with support down the order lead his team to a four wicket victory. The innings, which won him the man of the match award, was noted for its cover drives with Wisden stating that he "scored heavily between point and extra cover". The 3–0 series score made it England's first whitewash of a three-match series since 1978.

England continued their success during the second half of the English season as they beat the touring West Indies 4–0. Thorpe contributed a pair of half-centuries in the second Test at Edgbaston. In the following match at Old Trafford, he began his innings in partnership with Andrew Strauss for the first time and the two left-handers added 177 for the third wicket recovering the score from 40/3. Thorpe broke his little finger when struck by a Fidel Edwards bouncer on 91 but batted on to reach his 15th Test century with a score of 114. Due to the injury Thorpe was unable to field and not called upon to bat in the second innings as England won the match by seven wickets. He also missed the final Test with Ian Bell taking his place. Across the series Thorpe made 286 runs at 57.20 however he did drop several catches with Wisden picking out "his increasingly unreliable and slow performances in the field".

England began a tour of South Africa in December playing five Tests. In winning the opening match England achieved their eighth consecutive Test victory, a national record. In the second Test at Durban, Thorpe scored his 16th Test century helping England to recover a first innings deficit of 193. Despite centuries from Strauss and Marcus Trescothick, the match was in the balance when Thorpe began his innings but century stands with Andrew Flintoff and Geraint Jones helped secure a position from which they were able to declare, Thorpe remaining unbeaten on 118. In South Africa's second innings he became the fifth Englishman to register 100 Test catches as a fielder. Thorpe's other significant contribution of the series came in the final Test at Centurion Park where he batted over five and a half hours for a patient 86, taking time from a match South Africa needed to win to level the series. Overall he had an indifferent series, averaging 35.87, with Wisden assessing that he was "generally less convincing than in the past".

=== 2005 ===
At the start of the English season, Thorpe was in poor form making 78 runs in five County Championship innings while also missing a match due to a back injury. However he was included in England's squad for the two Tests against Bangladesh. He made 42 not out in the first Test and an unbeaten 66 in the second, during the latter innings he combined with Ian Bell to add 187 runs from 193 balls. Against weak opposition, England won both matches comfortably by an innings. The second Test brought Thorpe his 100th Test appearance, becoming the eighth English player to reach the landmark.

The form shown by Kevin Pietersen in the ODIs against Australia led to media speculation over which of Thorpe or Pietersen would be selected for the Ashes series. They opted for Pietersen with chairman of selectors David Graveney describing it as "the most difficult decision that I have been party to in my time as a selector". On 22 July, Thorpe announced his retirement from international cricket citing the arrival of his third child as the main reason behind the decision. A month later he retired from all first-class cricket stating: "In purely physical terms, I don't want to go through another season of taking painkillers and having injections in my back." He had intended to finish at the end of the season but suffered a back spasm ahead of the match with Hampshire and was not included in Surrey's squad for final game of the season, so his final first-class appearance came against Gloucestershire prior to the announcement.

== Style and personality ==
Thorpe was a batsman capable of adapting to attack or defence depending on the match situation. He was considered a counter-attacking batsman in the early stages of his international career before evolving into a more 'pragmatic player of percentages'. After being recalled in 1994, Thorpe returned with more intent to play his shots. His innings in that South Africa series were noted for their attacking nature and his strike rate of 65.30 was one of the highest of his career. Thorpe was not considered a powerful batsman but instead relied on crisp stroke-play and skillful placement of shots.

Thorpe was adept against fast or spin bowling but after the successful tours of Pakistan and Sri Lanka in 2000–01 he earned a reputation as the team's best player of spin. According to Alec Stewart, Thorpe adapted his batting method during the Pakistan tour from being stroke-maker to being a 'nudger and nurdler'. Mike Atherton rated Thorpe's Colombo century in testing conditions as "one of the finest I ever saw from an England player" despite a lack of fluent strokeplay. He described his technique as akin to French cricket where he played the ball late, with a low backlift and was able to use his wrists to place his shots past the fielders.

Writing in 2011, David Gower ranked Thorpe as the second best English batsman from those he had either played with or commentated on. He picked out his versality and ability to play Muralitharan. Angus Fraser assessed that Thorpe would be remembered as a good rather than great batsman because of his 16 Test centuries he only went on to pass 130 three times.

Thorpe was viewed as a quiet man, but on occasion had difficulties with authority figures. He clashed with his first county captain Ian Greig and was opposed to Surrey having separate dressing rooms for players depending on if they were capped or not. For England, he often failed to stick to the dress code but his most severe indiscretion came days ahead of the 1999 World Cup when he failed to attend an official function and was fined £1,000 by the ECB. In 2004, he outspokenly criticised the ECB for allowing England to tour Zimbabwe for an ODI series when they had pulled out of playing a World Cup match in the country the previous year.

David Lloyd, England coach from 1996 to 1999, was critical of Thorpe's attitude, accusing him of being surly and divisive. Ahead of Thorpe's recall in 2003, Fraser and Mike Selvey questioned the decision as potentially disrupting the team spirit. Fraser stated Thorpe was "his own man" who did not conform to the "little things that make a team a team".

== Records and statistics ==
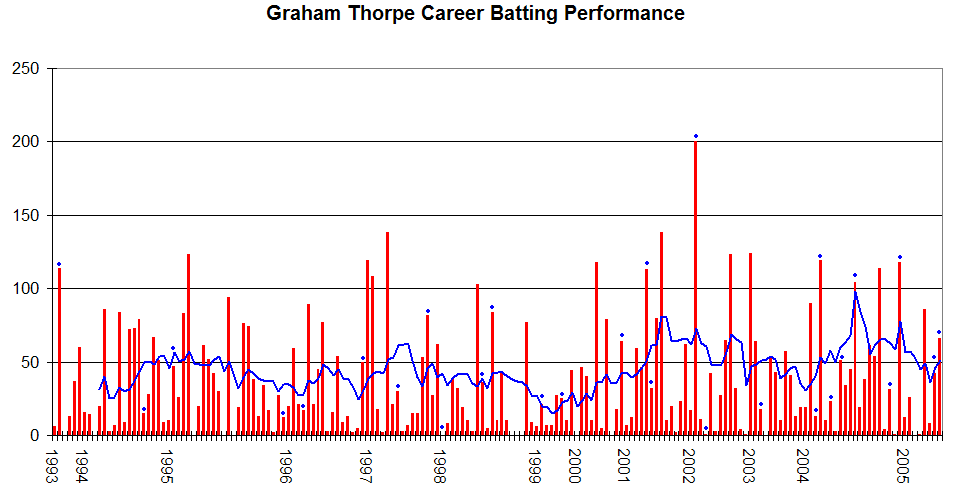
Graham Thorpe's career performance graph.

At the time of his retirement Thorpe's 6,744 Test runs placed him tenth on the list of leading run-scorers for England, with his 16 hundreds placing him joint ninth on the list of century makers. Thorpe spent the majority of his career batting at either number 4 or 5. He averaged 56.21 when batting at number 5 and his 3,373 runs in that position is an England record. He was noted for his record in a winning cause and successful fourth innings run chases. He averaged 62.62 in the 38 Test victories he experienced and averaged 108.25 in successful fourth innings run chases.

Thorpe was involved in four Test partnerships worth 250 or more, the only England player to have done so. The largest of these was a stand of 288 with Nasser Hussain which was the England fourth wicket record against Australia until surpassed by Kevin Pietersen and Paul Collingwood in 2006. His sixth wicket partnership of 281 with Andrew Flintoff was an England Test record for that wicket until bettered by Ben Stokes and Jonny Bairstow in 2016.

At the time of his ODI retirement in 2002, Thorpe's 2,380 runs placed him eighth on the list of leading run-scorers for England in the format. That run tally is the highest of any England player who never managed to score an ODI century.

In the ICC batting rankings Thorpe peaked at number 3 for Test cricket ahead of the West Indies tour in 1998. His peak in the ODI rankings was number 10.

=== Test centuries ===
During his career Thorpe made 16 centuries in international cricket, all of which were scored in Test matches. He scored multiple centuries against the six teams he played most often in Tests, but did not reach three figures against India (five Tests), Bangladesh (four Tests) or Zimbabwe (two Tests). The Kensington Oval was the only overseas ground at which he made two Test centuries, and despite playing more Tests at Lord's than any other ground he never got on their honours board, with a best score of 89.

Test centuries scored by Graham Thorpe
No.	Score	Opponents	Inn.	Venue	Date	Result	Ref
1	114 not out	Australia	3	Trent Bridge, Nottingham	1 July 1993	Drawn	
2	123	Australia	2	WACA Ground, Perth	3 February 1995	Lost	
3	119	New Zealand	2	Eden Park, Auckland	4 January 1997	Drawn	
4	108	New Zealand	2	Basin Reserve, Wellington	6 February 1997	Won	
5	138	Australia	2	Edgbaston, Birmingham	6 June 1997	Won	
6	103	West Indies	1	Kensington Oval, Bridgetown	12 March 1998	Drawn	
7	118	Pakistan	1	Gaddafi Stadium, Lahore	15 November 2000	Drawn	
8	113 not out	Sri Lanka	2	Colombo	15 March 2001	Won	
9	138	Pakistan	2	Old Trafford, Manchester	31 May 2001	Lost	
10	200 not out	New Zealand	3	Jade Stadium, Christchurch	13 March 2002	Won	
11	123	Sri Lanka	2	Edgbaston, Birmingham	20 May 2002	Won	
12	124	South Africa	2	The Oval, London	4 September 2003	Won	
13	119 not out	West Indies	2	Kensington Oval, Bridgetown	1 April 2004	Won	
14	104 not out	New Zealand	4	Old Trafford, Manchester	4 June 2004	Won	
15	114	West Indies	2	The Oval, London	12 August 2004	Won	
16	118 not out	South Africa	3	Kingsmead Cricket Ground, Durban	26 December 2004	Drawn	

== Post-playing career ==
=== Coaching ===
Ahead of playing in the 2005 Bangladesh series Thorpe announced he would coach for New South Wales the following winter as well as playing Sydney Grade Cricket. He played for UTS Balmain and was available to play for New South Wales, if required, but made only one second XI appearance for the state side. After two seasons as batting consultant for New South Wales, he was named assistant coach ahead of the 2007–08 campaign, replacing Matthew Mott who was promoted to the position of head coach. In January 2008, he resigned from the position for business and family reasons. Later that year he returned to Surrey as batting coach, holding the position for two years before joining the ECB in a national lead batting coach role working with the England Lions and younger development squads.

At the start of 2013, the ECB split the coaching of the Test and white ball sides, as part of this reshuffle Thorpe became batting coach for the senior England white ball teams. Following the appointment of Chris Silverwood as England head coach in 2019, Thorpe was named as one of his three assistants. During the COVID-19 affected summer of 2020, Thorpe was interim head coach for England's Twenty20 series with Pakistan. He also stood in during the fourth Test of the 2021–22 Ashes series with Silverwood self-isolating. Following the end of the series, Thorpe was involved in a drinking session with England and Australia players which continued until 6 a.m. and resulted in the police being called. He was among those to be dismissed by the ECB after the 4–0 Ashes defeat.

In March 2022, Thorpe was announced as the new head coach of Afghanistan, but fell seriously ill before beginning the role.

=== Media ===
Thorpe worked with BBC Radio 5 Live's commentary team for the final Test of the 2005 Ashes. He made his debut as a summariser for BBC Radio's Test Match Special programme during India's 2007 tour of England. He also appeared as a match summariser on Sky Sports' highlights coverage for the same series.

In September 2005 Thorpe released an autobiography entitled Rising from the Ashes. He wrote a monthly column for the UK-based cricket magazine, SPIN World Cricket Monthly.

Thorpe appeared on an Ashes special edition of The Weakest Link in 2005. He also competed on the 2008 remake of Superstars.

=== Honours ===
Thorpe was appointed a Member of the Order of the British Empire (MBE) in the 2006 Birthday Honours.

As part of the extension of the Oval members' pavilion in 2021, a room was named after Thorpe.

There is a street in Maggona, Sri Lanka named 'Graham Thorpe Road'. Following the 2004 tsunami, Surrey organised a charity match which raised funds of £1.5 million to help re-build the village and create the Surrey Village Cricket Ground. In September 2025, a road adjacent to Thorpe's boyhood club in Farnham was named 'Graham Thorpe Drive'.

In November 2024, a new trophy was launched named the Crowe-Thorpe Trophy in tribute to Thorpe and New Zealand batsman Martin Crowe. The trophy will be played for in Test series between England and New Zealand.

In August 2025, the second day of the final Test between England and India was dedicated 'A Day for Thorpey' with over £165,000 raised for mental charity Mind.

== Personal life and death ==
Thorpe married his first wife Nicola in September 1995 having first met her on a Surrey pre-season tour to Dubai. The couple had two children, a boy born in November 1996 and a girl born in April 1999. The couple separated in late 2001, with Graham leaving India for England in a failed attempt to save the relationship. The resulting divorce proceedings and custody battle led to him taking a break from cricket in the summer of 2002.

Thorpe met his second wife Amanda at a benefit function for his Surrey team-mate Ali Brown. The couple had a child together in August 2005 before getting married in 2007; his wife also had a daughter from her first marriage.

Thorpe suffered from severe depression and anxiety in the final years of his life and was admitted to intensive care following a suicide attempt in May 2022. On 10 May 2022, the Professional Cricketers' Association released a statement on behalf of Thorpe's family stating that he was seriously ill, though the nature of his condition was not disclosed.

On 4 August 2024, Thorpe died by suicide, stepping in front of a train at Esher railway station; he was 55 years old. His family publicly revealed his cause of death and mental health struggles a week after his death, with the intention of raising awareness.
