= 1997 Benson & Hedges Cup =

- Administrator: England and Wales Cricket Board
- Cricket format: Limited overs cricket (50 overs per innings)
- Champions: Surrey (2nd title)
- Participants: 22
- Matches: 57
- Most runs: 384 Alec Stewart (Surrey)
- Most wickets: 17 Matthew Fleming (Kent)

The 1997 Benson & Hedges Cup was the twenty-sixth edition of cricket's Benson & Hedges Cup. It was an English limited overs county cricket tournament which was held between 28 April and 12 July 1997.

The competition was won by Surrey County Cricket Club for the second time, defeating Kent County Cricket Club by 8 wickets in the final at Lord's on 12 July 1997.

== Fixtures and results ==
=== Group stage ===
==== Group A ====
Team	Pld	W	L	NR	A	Pts	NRRA100
Yorkshire	5	4	1	0	0	8	16.132
Warwickshire	5	3	2	0	0	6	15.220
Derbyshire	5	3	2	0	0	6	2.689
Lancashire	5	3	2	0	0	6	-1.503
Worcestershire	5	2	3	0	0	4	-3.896
Minor Counties	5	0	5	0	0	0	-28.565

==== Group B ====
Team	Pld	W	L	NR	A	Pts	NRRA100
Leicestershire	4	3	1	0	0	6	18.149
Northamptonshire	4	3	1	0	0	6	9.131
Durham	4	2	2	0	0	4	14.744
Nottinghamshire	4	1	2	0	1	3	-12.968
Scotland	4	0	3	0	1	1	-51.265

==== Group C ====
Team	Pld	W	L	NR	A	Pts	NRRA100
Kent	5	4	0	1	0	9	9.850
Surrey	5	4	1	0	0	8	21.192
Gloucestershire	5	2	2	1	0	5	7.062
Sussex	5	2	3	0	0	4	-0.512
Hampshire	5	1	4	0	0	2	-15.496
British Universities	5	1	4	0	0	2	-18.565

==== Group D ====
Team	Pld	W	L	NR	A	Pts	NRRA100
Essex	4	3	0	0	1	7	8.538
Somerset	4	3	1	0	0	6	29.875
Glamorgan	4	2	2	0	0	4	-6.827
Ireland	4	1	2	0	1	3	-32.622
Middlesex	4	0	4	0	0	0	-6.750

=== Quarter-finals ===
27 May 1997
(scorecard)

Essex; 214 all out (45.5 overs)	v	Surrey; 215/4 (42.3 overs)
Nasser Hussain 52; Martin Bicknell 3/40 (10 overs)		Graham Thorpe 73; Mark Ilott 2/60 (10 overs)

Surrey won by 6 wickets
County Ground, Chelmsford
Umpires: John Harris & Mervyn Kitchen
Player of the match: Martin Bicknell (Surrey)

27 May 1997
(scorecard)

Warwickshire; 304/8 (50 overs)	v	Kent; 306/6 (49.3 overs)
Neil Smith 125; Matthew Fleming 4/58 (10 overs)		Matthew Walker 117; Gladstone Small 2/51 (10 overs)

Kent won by 4 wickets
St Lawrence Ground, Canterbury
Umpires: George Sharp & Alan Whitehead
Player of the match: Matthew Walker (Kent)

27 May 1997
(scorecard)

Leicestershire; 197 all out (46.2 overs)	v	Somerset; 177 all out (47.5 overs)
Ben Smith 61; Harvey Trump 4/51 (10 overs)		Andy Caddick 38; Alan Mullally 3/33 (9 overs)

Leicestershire won by 20 runs
Grace Road, Leicester
Umpires: Barrie Leadbeater & Bob White
Player of the match: David Millns (Leicestershire)

27 May 1997
(scorecard)

Yorkshire; 253/9 (50 overs)	v	Northamptonshire; 254/3 (46 overs)
Michael Vaughan 85; David Capel 5/51 (10 overs)		Rob Bailey 70*; Craig White 1/44 (10 overs)

Northamptonshire won by 7 wickets
Headingley Cricket Ground, Leeds
Umpires: Barrie Meyer & Nigel Plews
Player of the match: David Capel (Northamptonshire)

=== Semi-finals ===
10 June 1997
(scorecard)

Kent; 206/8 (50 overs)	v	Northamptonshire; 140 all out (46 overs)
Trevor Ward 78; David Follett 2/30 (5 overs)		Rob Bailey 33; Paul Strang 4/29 (10 overs)

Kent won by 66 runs
St Lawrence Ground, Canterbury
Umpires: Allan Jones & Roy Palmer
Player of the match: Dean Headley (Kent)

10 June 1997
(scorecard)

Surrey; 308/8 (50 overs)	v	Leicestershire; 178 all out (45.3 overs)
Alec Stewart 87; Alan Mullally 2/53 (10 overs)		Paul Nixon 53; Martin Bicknell 4/41 (10 overs)

Surrey won by 130 runs
The Foster's Oval, London
Umpires: John Holder & Ray Julian
Player of the match: Martin Bicknell (Surrey)

=== Final ===
12 July 1997
(scorecard)

Kent; 212/9 (50 overs)	v	Surrey; 215/2 (45 overs)
Mark Ealham 52; Chris Lewis 3/39 (10 overs)		Ben Hollioake 98; Mark Ealham 1/31 (6 overs)

Surrey won by 8 wickets
Lord's, London
Umpires: George Sharp & David Shepherd
Player of the match: Ben Hollioake (Surrey)

== See also ==
Benson & Hedges Cup
