= English cricket team in New Zealand in 2001–02 =

English cricket team in New Zealand in 2001-02
	New Zealand	England
- Dates: 8 February 2002 – 3 April 2002
Captains	Stephen Fleming	Nasser Hussain

Test series
- Result: 3-match series drawn 1–1
Most runs	Nathan Astle (314)	Nasser Hussain (280)
Most wickets	Chris Drum (12)	Andy Caddick (19)

One Day International series
- Results: New Zealand won the 5-match series 3–2
Most runs	Nathan Astle (221)	Nick Knight (224)
Most wickets	Chris Cairns (11)	Darren Gough (13)

The England national cricket team toured New Zealand between February and April 2002 to play a five-match One Day International series against the New Zealand national cricket team, followed by a three-match Test series. New Zealand won the ODI series 3–2, while the Test series was drawn 1-1.

== Background ==
England's tour itinerary was announced in August 2001. It was reported that they would play a total of five ODIs and three Tests, and two first-class and List A fixtures each. The tour would commence on 8 February 2002 and end on 3 March. New Zealand would play England after a two-match home Test series against Bangladesh in December 2001. It was announced that all ODI matches would be day/night fixtures, and that they would begin at 2:00 p.m. (NZST). The venue of a first-class fixture against Otago was changed from Carisbrook, Dunedin, to Queenstown, due to clash over a Rugby Union match scheduled there on the same day, 2 March 2002.

England last toured New Zealand in 1996–97 and were victorious in the Test series, 2–0. The five-match ODI series was shared 2–2. The two teams' most recent meeting was in England in 1999 for a four-Test series. The visitors had taken the series 2–1. England entered New Zealand on the back of two consecutive ODI wins to level the ODI series 3–3 against India after being down 3–1, while the hosts were also in good form after having made the final of the triangular series in Australia. However, they lost the best-of-three final to South Africa 2–0. However, they had defeated world champions Australia in three out of four matches enroute to the final.

Going into the Test series, England and New Zealand were ranked fourth and fifth in the ICC Test Team Rankings. The Chief Executive of New Zealand Cricket Martin Snedden, on the allocation of Test matches to Christchurch, Wellington and Auckland stated that, "... was primarily influenced by the desire for a geographical spread which would provide as many New Zealanders as possible the opportunity to experience Test cricket firsthand." He added, "Other factors taken into account by the Board were pitch and playing surface quality; results achieved and player preference; financial returns; spectator, hospitality and media facilities; and accommodation requirements for tour groups, media, teams and officials."

== Squads ==
ODIs		Tests	
New Zealand	England	New Zealand	England
Stephen Fleming (c); Andre Adams; Nathan Astle; ~~Shane Bond~~; Ian Butler; Chris Cairns; Chris Harris; Brendon McCullum; Craig McMillan; Chris Nevin; Daryl Tuffey; Daniel Vettori; Lou Vincent	Nasser Hussain (c); Andrew Caddick; Paul Collingwood; Andrew Flintoff; James Foster; Ashley Giles; Darren Gough; Matthew Hoggard; Ben Hollioake; Nick Knight; Owais Shah; Jeremy Snape; Graham Thorpe; Marcus Trescothick; Michael Vaughan; ~~Craig White~~	Stephen Fleming (c); Andre Adams; Nathan Astle; Ian Butler; Chris Cairns; Chris Drum; Chris Harris; Matt Horne; Chris Martin; Craig McMillan; Adam Parore; Mark Richardson; Daryl Tuffey; Daniel Vettori; Lou Vincent	Nasser Hussain (c); Usman Afzaal; Ian Bell; Mark Butcher; Andrew Caddick; ~~Robert Croft~~; Richard Dawson; Andrew Flintoff; James Foster; Ashley Giles; Warren Hegg; Matthew Hoggard; Jimmy Ormond; Mark Ramprakash; Graham Thorpe; Marcus Trescothick; Michael Vaughan; Craig White

The English selectors named a 16-member squad for both the India and New Zealand ODI series on 17 October 2001. Eleven members from the successful tour of Zimbabwe were retained. Five inclusions were Andrew Caddick, Darren Gough, Ashley Giles, Michael Vaughan and Craig White. They replaced Paul Grayson, James Kirtley, Mark Ramprakash, Ryan Sidebottom and Chris Silverwood. The selectors stated: "We have chosen this squad with a view to building a One-Day side for the next World Cup in South Africa and beyond." Craig White, who aggravated his knee injury during the Test series in India, was ruled out of the ODI series. His replacement was not named.

The New Zealand squad for the ODI series was named on 10 February. Two changes were made to the side that made the finals at the VB Series a week prior. Chris Nevin and Daryl Tuffey were recalled. Adam Parore, James Franklin, Scott Styris and Mark Richardson were dropped, while Dion Nash was ruled out due to an injury. Ian Butler was included in the squad ahead of the First ODI after Shane Bond was ruled out owing to a suspected stress fracture of his left ankle.

The English selectors announced a 16-member squad for England's India and New Zealand tour on 28 August 2001. The squad included two uncapped players: Essex wicket-keeper, James Foster, and Yorkshire off-spinner, Richard Dawson. Lancashire wicket-keeper Warren Hegg was recalled to the squad. The squad was depleted of paceman Darren Gough, who made himself unavailable for selection, and batsmen Michael Atherton and Alec Stewart, who had announced their retirement following the Ashes series. A squad was announced following the India series; all-rounder Andrew Flintoff replaced Robert Croft. After captain Nasser Hussain and Mark Butcher sustained injuries in the First Test, Warwickshire 19-year-old batsman Ian Bell was called in as cover.

The New Zealand squad for the Test series was announced on 8 March. Butler made the squad, replacing Bond. The other change from the side named for the Bangladesh series was Mathew Sinclair, who was left out. For the Second Test, Chris Harris and Daryl Tuffey were included in the squad. Andre Adams was ruled out because of a niggling shoulder injury.

== Tour matches ==
=== List A: Northern Districts v England XI ===
8 February 2002 (D/N)
Scorecard

England XI; 288/6 (50 overs)	v	Northern Districts; 293/7 (49.1 overs)
Nick Knight 126 (125); Graeme Aldridge 2/39 (10 overs)		Simon Doull 80 (47); Darren Gough 2/59 (10 overs)

Northern Districts won by 3 wickets
Seddon Park, Hamilton
Umpires: Doug Cowie (NZ) and Steve Dunne (NZ)

- Northern Districts won the toss and elected to field

=== List A: Northern Districts v England XI ===
10 February 2002 (D/N)
Scorecard

Northern Districts; 160 (49.2 overs)	v	England XI; 163/5 (33.4 overs)
Grant Bradburn 46* (84); Andrew Flintoff 3/20 (9 overs)		Andrew Flintoff 45* (25); Joseph Yovich 3/33 (6 overs)

England XI won by 5 wickets
Seddon Park, Hamilton
Umpires: Billy Bowden (NZ) and Evan Watkin (NZ)

- Northern Districts won the toss and elected to bat

=== First Class: Otago v England XI ===
2–4 March 2002
Scorecard

England XI	v	Otago
153 (49.4 overs); Warren Hegg 32 (59); Craig Pryor 5/45 (12 overs)		150/6d (56 overs); Brendon McCullum 34 (45); Andy Caddick 4/42 (18 overs)
257 (57.1 overs); Marcus Trescothick 68 (85); Kerry Walmsley 5/51 (15 overs)		124/6 (42 overs); Craig Cumming 57* (116); Andy Caddick 3/43 (14 overs)

Match drawn
Queenstown Events Centre, Queenstown
Umpires: Steven Dunne (NZ) and Evan Watkin (NZ)

- Otago won the toss and elected to field

=== First Class: Canterbury v England XI ===
7–9 March 2002
Scorecard

Canterbury	v	England XI
212/8d (74.1 overs); Chris Harris 82 (154); Andy Caddick 5/69 (24 overs)		432/9d (106 overs); Michael Vaughan 156 (198); Warren Wisneski 3/88 (20 overs)
175/2 (73 overs); Robbie Frew 72 (205); Craig White 1/28 (12 overs)

Match drawn
Hagley Oval, Christchurch
Umpires: Robert Anderson (NZ) and Dave Quested (NZ)

- England XI won the toss and elected to field

== ODI series ==
=== 1st ODI ===
13 February 2002 (D/N)
Scorecard

England; 196 (40.2 overs)	v	New Zealand; 198/6 (38.3 overs)
Nick Knight 73 (70); Daniel Vettori 3/17 (8 overs)		Nathan Astle 67 (105); Darren Gough 4/44 (9 overs)

New Zealand won by 4 wickets
Jade Stadium, Christchurch
Umpires: Tony Hill (NZ) and Evan Watkin (NZ)
Player of the match: Nathan Astle (NZ)

- England won the toss and elected to bat
- Reduced to 42 overs per side due to rain
- Ian Butler (NZ) made his ODI debut

=== 2nd ODI ===
16 February 2002 (D/N)
Scorecard

New Zealand; 244/8 (50 overs)	v	England; 89 (37.2 overs)
Craig McMillan 69 (91); Darren Gough 3/47 (10 overs)		Andrew Flintoff 26 (57); Nathan Astle 3/4 (2.2 overs)

New Zealand won by 155 runs
Wellington Regional Stadium, Wellington
Umpires: Steve Dunne (NZ) and Dave Quested (NZ)
Player of the match: Andre Adams (NZ)

- England won the toss and elected to field

=== 3rd ODI ===
20 February 2002 (D/N)
Scorecard

England; 244/5 (50 overs)	v	New Zealand; 201 (46.3 overs)
Nick Knight 80 (129); Chris Cairns 3/51 (10 overs)		Stephen Fleming 76 (112); Paul Collingwood 4/38 (8 overs)

England won by 43 runs
McLean Park, Napier
Umpires: Billy Bowden (NZ) and Doug Cowie (NZ)
Player of the match: Paul Collingwood (Eng)

- New Zealand won the toss and elected to field

=== 4th ODI ===
23 February 2002 (D/N)
Scorecard

England; 193/6 (40 overs)	v	New Zealand; 189 (38 overs)
Michael Vaughan 59 (53); Chris Cairns 2/39 (8 overs)		Chris Cairns 58 (56); Andrew Flintoff 4/17 (7 overs)

England won by 33 runs (D/L)
Eden Park, Auckland
Umpires: Doug Cowie (NZ) and Tony Hill (NZ)
Player of the match: Andrew Flintoff (Eng)

- England won the toss and elected to bat
- Reduced to 40 overs per side due to rain

=== 5th ODI ===
26 February 2002 (D/N)
Scorecard

England; 218/8 (50 overs)	v	New Zealand; 223/5 (48.5 overs)
Owais Shah 57 (81); Chris Cairns 3/32 (10 overs)		Nathan Astle 122* (150); Craig White 2/30 (10 overs)

New Zealand won by 5 wickets
Carisbrook, Dunedin
Umpires: Steve Dunne (NZ) and Dave Quested (NZ)
Player of the match: Nathan Astle (NZ)

- England won the toss and elected to bat.
- Nathan Astle (NZ) played his 150th ODI.

== Test series ==
=== 1st Test ===
13–16 March 2002
Scorecard

England	v	New Zealand
228 (81.2 overs); Nasser Hussain 106 (244); Chris Drum 3/36 (20.2 overs)		147 (51.2 overs); Daniel Vettori 42 (57); Matthew Hoggard 7/63 (21.2 overs)
468/6d (96.4 overs); Graham Thorpe 200* (231); Ian Butler 3/137 (23 overs)		451 (93.3 overs); Nathan Astle 222 (168); Andy Caddick 6/122 (25 overs)

England won by 98 runs
Jade Stadium, Christchurch
Umpires: Billy Bowden (NZ) and Asoka de Silva (SL)
Player of the match: Graham Thorpe (Eng)

- New Zealand won the toss and elected to field
- Ian Butler (NZ) made his Test debut
- Nathan Astle scored the fastest double-century in Test history in terms of balls faced (153), surpassing Adam Gilchrist's 214-ball effort. He was also second fastest in terms of minutes (217) after Don Bradman (214).

=== 2nd Test ===
21–25 March 2002
Scorecard

England	v	New Zealand
280 (88.3 overs); Nasser Hussain 66 (160); Ian Butler 4/60 (18.3 overs)		218 (88.3 overs); Mark Richardson 42 (57); Andy Caddick 6/63 (28.3 overs)
293/4d (65 overs); Marcus Trescothick 88 (129); Daniel Vettori 3/90 (24 overs)		158/4 (84 overs); Lou Vincent 71 (170); Matthew Hoggard 2/31 (13 overs)

Match drawn
Basin Reserve, Wellington
Umpires: Steve Dunne (NZ) and Darrell Hair (Aus)
Player of the match: Andy Caddick (Eng)

- New Zealand won the toss and elected to field
- Play abandoned on Day 1, and start of play delayed on Day 2

=== 3rd Test ===
30 March–3 April 2002
Scorecard

New Zealand	v	England
202 (88.3 overs); Chris Harris 71 (185); Andy Caddick 4/70 (25 overs)		160 (45.4 overs); Graham Thorpe 42 (89); Daryl Tuffey 6/54 (19 overs)
269/9d (63.1 overs); Nathan Astle 65 (51); Matthew Hoggard 4/68 (19.1 overs)		233 (63 overs); Nasser Hussain 82 (119); Chris Drum 3/52 (10 overs)

New Zealand won by 78 runs
Eden Park, Auckland
Umpires: Doug Cowie (NZ) and Srinivas Venkataraghavan (Ind)
Player of the match: Daryl Tuffey (NZ)

- New Zealand won the toss and elected to bat
- Play shortened on Day 2, and late start on Day 3 due to rain
- Andre Adams (NZ) made his Test debut.
- Andy Caddick (Eng) claimed his 200th wicket in Tests.
- Adam Parore achieved 200 wicket-keeping dismissals in what was his last international match.
- Stephen Fleming (NZ) held his 100th Test catch.

== External sources ==
- Tour page at Cricinfo
