= 1998–99 Coca-Cola Cup =

- Date: 7–16 April 1999
- Location: Sharjah, United Arab Emirates
- Result: Won by Pakistan
- Player of the series: Shoaib Akhtar (Pak)
Teams
Pakistan	India	England
Captains
Wasim Akram	Mohammad Azharuddin	Alec Stewart
Most runs
Ijaz Ahmed (220)	Rahul Dravid (188)	Graham Thorpe (179)
Most wickets
Shoaib Akhtar (11)	Venkatesh Prasad (10)	Darren Gough (8)

The 1998–99 Coca-Cola Cup was a triangular ODI cricket competition held in Sharjah, United Arab Emirates from 7 to 16 April 1999. It featured the national cricket teams of England, Pakistan and India. Its official sponsor was Coca-Cola. The tournament was won by Pakistan, which defeated India in the final.

== Squads ==
England	India	Pakistan
Alec Stewart (c) (wk); Graham Thorpe; Graeme Hick; Nick Knight; Neil Fairbrother; Andrew Flintoff; Mark Ealham; Darren Gough; Adam Hollioake; Robert Croft; Vince Wells; Ian Austin; Alan Mullally; Angus Fraser	Mohammad Azharuddin (c); Javagal Srinath; Ajay Jadeja; Anil Kumble; Sadagoppan Ramesh; Venkatesh Prasad; Nayan Mongia (wk); Anil Kumble; Robin Singh; Sunil Joshi; Vinod Kambli; Ajit Agarkar; Rahul Dravid; Sourav Ganguly; Hrishikesh Kanitkar; Amay Khurasiya	Wasim Akram (c); Inzamam-ul-Haq; Moin Khan (wk); Azhar Mahmood; Shoaib Akhtar; Saeed Anwar; Shahid Afridi; Wajahatullah Wasti; Ijaz Ahmed; Arshad Khan; Saqlain Mushtaq; Yousuf Youhana; Saleem Malik

== Points table ==
Team	Pld	W	L	T	NR	NRR	Pts
India	4	3	1	0	0	−0.392	6
Pakistan	4	2	2	0	0	+0.678	4
England	4	1	3	0	0	−0.285	2

== Group stage ==
=== 1st ODI ===
7 April (D/N)
Scorecard

Pakistan; 323/5 (50 overs)	v	England; 233 (45.5 overs)
Ijaz Ahmed 137 (130); Darren Gough 3/55 (10 overs)		Graeme Hick 65 (90); Saqlain Mushtaq 3/23 (7.5 overs)

Pakistan won by 90 runs
Sharjah Cricket Association Stadium, Sharjah
Umpires: K. T. Francis (SL) and Ian Robinson (Zim)
Player of the match: Ijaz Ahmed (Pak)

- Pakistan won the toss and elected to bat.

=== 2nd ODI ===
8 April (D/N)
Scorecard

Pakistan; 279/8 (50 overs)	v	India; 163/6 (50 overs)
Inzamam-ul-Haq 107 (115); Venkatesh Prasad 3/69 (10 overs)		Sunil Joshi 38* (48); Azhar Mahmood 2/20 (10 overs)

Pakistan won by 116 runs
Sharjah Cricket Association Stadium, Sharjah
Umpires: Darrell Hair (Aus) and Ian Robinson (Zim)
Player of the match: Inzamam-ul-Haq (Pak)

- Pakistan won the toss and elected to bat.

=== 3rd ODI ===
9 April (D/N)
Scorecard

India; 222/5 (50 overs)	v	England; 202 (47.5 overs)
Mohammad Azharuddin 74* (85); Andrew Flintoff 2/24 (5 overs)		Neil Fairbrother 57 (77); Ajay Jadeja 3/3 (1 over)

India won by 20 runs
Sharjah Cricket Association Stadium, Sharjah
Umpires: Darrell Hair (Aus) and K. T. Francis (SL)
Player of the match: Ajay Jadeja (Ind)

- India won the toss and elected to bat.

=== 4th ODI ===
11 April (D/N)
Scorecard

India; 239/6 (50 overs)	v	England; 230 (48.5 overs)
Ajay Jadeja 74* (67); Darren Gough 2/49 (10 overs)		Nick Knight 84 (93); Venkatesh Prasad 3/35 (10 overs)

India won by 9 runs
Sharjah Cricket Association Stadium, Sharjah
Umpires: Darrell Hair (Aus) and K. T. Francis (SL)
Player of the match: Venkatesh Prasad (Ind)

- India won the toss and elected to bat.

=== 5th ODI ===
12 April (D/N)
Scorecard

England; 206 (49.1 overs)	v	Pakistan; 144 (40.2 overs)
Graham Thorpe 62 (80); Shoaib Akhtar 4/37 (10 overs)		Saleem Malik 47* (77); Mark Ealham 4/30 (10 overs)

England won by 62 runs
Sharjah Cricket Association Stadium, Sharjah
Umpires: Ian Robinson (Zim) and K. T. Francis (SL)
Player of the match: Mark Ealham (Eng)

- England won the toss and elected to bat.

=== 6th ODI ===
13 April (D/N)
Scorecard

Pakistan; 205/9 (50 overs)	v	India; 206/4 (48.1 overs)
Moin Khan 54 (61); Ajay Jadeja 2/19 (3 overs)		Sadagoppan Ramesh 82 (131); Shoaib Akhtar 2/43 (10 overs)

India won by 6 wickets
Sharjah Cricket Association Stadium, Sharjah
Umpires: Ian Robinson (Zim) and Darrell Hair (Aus)
Player of the match: Sadagoppan Ramesh (Ind)

- Pakistan won the toss and elected to bat.

== Final ==
16 April (D/N)
Scorecard

India; 125 (45 overs)	v	Pakistan; 129/2 (28 overs)
Sourav Ganguly 50 (96); Wasim Akram 3/11 (8 overs)		Inzamam-ul-Haq 39* (38); Anil Kumble 2/28 (9 overs)

Pakistan won by 8 wickets
Sharjah Cricket Association Stadium, Sharjah
Umpires: Darrell Hair (Aus) and K. T. Francis (SL)
Player of the match: Wasim Akram (Pak)

- India won the toss and elected to bat.
- Pakistan won the 1998/1999 Coca-Cola Cup
