= Pakistani cricket team in England in 2001 =

Pakistan in England in 2001
	England	Pakistan
- Dates: 8 May – 4 June 2001
Captains	Nasser Hussain	Waqar Younis

Test series
- Result: 2-match series drawn 1–1
Most runs	Graham Thorpe (228)	Inzamam-ul-Haq (232)
Most wickets	Darren Gough (14)	Waqar Younis (7)
- Player of the series: Graham Thorpe (Eng); Inzamam-ul-Haq (Pak)

The Pakistan cricket team toured England in the 2001 season to play a two-match Test series against England in late May. The tour included three First-class matches, one University match and one List A match.

The Test series was drawn 1-1. The test series was followed by the Tri-nation NatWest series including Australia as well.

== Tour matches ==
=== University match: British Universities vs Pakistanis ===
8–10 May 2001
Scorecard

British Universities	v	Pakistanis
74 (32.2 overs); James Pyemont 18 (63); Wasim Akram 4/18 (11 overs)		316 (85.5 overs); Saeed Anwar 89 (115); Tim Murtagh 6/86 (22.5 overs)
155 (58 overs); Will Jefferson 40 (43); Mushtaq Ahmed 8/49 (24 overs)

Pakistanis won by an innings and 87 runs
Trent Bridge, Nottingham
Umpires: Jeff Evans (Eng) and Vanburn Holder (Win)

- British Universities won the toss and elected to bat.

=== First-class: Derbyshire vs Pakistanis ===
8–10 May 2001
Scorecard

Derbyshire	v	Pakistanis
166 (59.1 overs); Mathew Dowman 36 (79); Saqlain Mushtaq 6/34 (21.1 overs)		262 (78.3 overs); Azhar Mahmood 80 (102); Nathan Dumelow 4/81 (22 overs)
247/5d (72.2 overs); Mathew Dowman 145* (203); Waqar Younis 2/22 (12 overs)		63/1 (20 overs); Abdul Razzaq 34* (53); Trevor Smith 1/14 (5 overs)

Match drawn
County Ground, Derbyshire
Umpires: Tony Clarkson (Eng) and Peter Willey (Eng)

- Derbyshire won the toss and elected to bat.

=== First-class: Kent vs Pakistanis ===
12–14 May 2001
Scorecard

Kent	v	Pakistanis
313/5d (85 overs); Rob Key 119 (194); Saqlain Mushtaq 2/68 (21 overs)		307/1d (70.2 overs); Saeed Anwar 201 (230); Amjad Khan 1/46 (8.2 overs)
84/3 (35.4 overs); David Fulton 40 (80); Saqlain Mushtaq 1/6 (3.4 overs)

Match drawn
St Lawrence Ground, Canterbury
Umpires: Roy Palmer (Eng) and David Shepherd (Eng)

- Pakistanis won the toss and elected to field.
- No play was possible on Day 3 due to heavy rain.

=== List A: Leicestershire vs Pakistanis ===
23 May 2001
Scorecard

Leicestershire; 225/7 (50 overs)	v	Pakistanis; 228/3 (42.4 overs)
Ben Smith 105 (116); Shoaib Akhtar 4/37 (10 overs)		Saleem Elahi 108* (114); Jonathan Dakin 1/27 (6 overs)

Pakistanis won by 7 wickets
Grace Road, Leicester
Umpires: Mervyn Kitchen (Eng) and Alan Whitehead

- Leicestershire won the toss and elected to bat.

=== First-class: Leicestershire vs Pakistanis ===
24–25 May 2001
Scorecard

Leicestershire	v	Pakistanis
96 (32.3 overs); Iain Sutcliffe 55 (97); Waqar Younis 5/23 (9 overs)		294 (99.3 overs); Faisal Iqbal 83 (186); Scott Boswell 3/87 (26.3 overs)
172 (55.3 overs); Iain Sutcliffe 38 (102); Saqlain Mushtaq 4/37 (18.3 overs)

Pakistanis won by an innings and 26 runs
Grace Road, Leicester
Umpires: Pasty Harris (Eng) and Nigel Llong (Eng)

- Leicestershire won the toss and elected to bat.
- Waqar Younis (Pak) took a hat-trick.

== Test series ==
=== 1st Test ===
17–20 May 2001
Scorecard

Pakistan	v	England
203 (57 overs); Younis Khan 58 (99); Darren Gough 5/61 (16 overs)		391 (130 overs); Graham Thorpe 80 (145); Azhar Mahmood 4/50 (26 overs)
179 (59.3 overs); Abdul Razzaq 53 (123); Andy Caddick 4/54 (18 overs)

England won by an innings and 9 runs
Lord's, London
Umpires: Darrell Hair (Aus) and Peter Willey (Eng)
Player of the match: Andy Caddick (Eng)

- Pakistan won the toss and elected to field.
- No play was possible on Day 1 due to rain.
- Ryan Sidebottom and Ian Ward (both Eng) made their Test debut.

=== 2nd Test ===
31 May–4 June 2001
Scorecard

Pakistan	v	England
403 (96.4 overs); Inzamam-ul-Haq 114 (153); Matthew Hoggard 3/79 (19 overs)		357 (111.2 overs); Graham Thorpe 138 (269); Abdul Razzaq 3/61 (19 overs)
323 (98.6 overs); Inzamam-ul-Haq 85 (186); Darren Gough 3/85 (22.5 overs)		261 (105.1 overs); Marcus Trescothick 117 (272); Saqlain Mushtaq 4/74 (47 overs)

Pakistan won by 108 runs
Old Trafford, Manchester
Umpires: Eddie Nicholls (Win) and David Shepherd (Eng)
Player of the match: Inzamam-ul-Haq (Pak)

- Pakistan won the toss and elected to bat.
- Start of play in Day 1 was delayed 32 minutes due to wet field.
- No play was possible on Day 2 after tea due to heavy rain.
- Bad light stopped play in last hour on Day 3.
- Mike Atherton (Eng) passed 7,500 test runs.

== External sources ==
- CricketArchive
