= Australian cricket team in England and Ireland in 2001 =

2001 Ashes Series
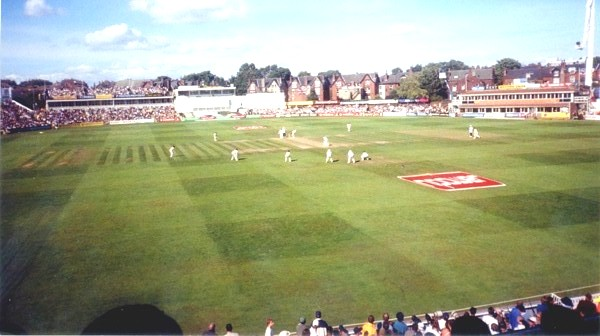
- 2001 Ashes test; Headingley
- Date: 5 July 2001 – 27 August 2001
- Location: England
- Result: Australia won the five-Test series 4–1
- Player of the series: Glenn McGrath (Aus) and Mark Butcher (Eng)
Teams
- England: Australia
Captains
- Nasser Hussain (1st and 4th–5th Tests) Michael Atherton (2nd and 3rd Tests): Steve Waugh (1st–3rd and 5th Tests); Adam Gilchrist (4th Test)
Most runs
- Mark Butcher (456): Mark Waugh (430)
Most wickets
- Darren Gough (17): Glenn McGrath (32)

In 2001, the Australia national cricket team toured England and Ireland to play county matches and the 2001 Ashes series. The Ashes series was played from 5 July to 27 August.

Australia comfortably won the Test series 4–1 and retained the Ashes, which were in their possession since 1989. The players of the series were Glenn McGrath from Australia and Mark Butcher from England. The England captain Michael Atherton finished his international career after the fifth and final test of the series.

As of 2025, this remains the last time Australia have won the Ashes outright in England.

== Background ==
The five match Ashes series was played from 5 July to 27 August.

Prior to the series, the Australian team played tour matches against English teams in:

- Worcestershire County Cricket Club
- Middlesex County Cricket Club
- Northamptonshire County Cricket Club
- Marylebone Cricket Club
- Essex County Cricket Club
- Somerset County Cricket Club
- Hampshire County Cricket Club
- Sussex County Cricket Club

Tour matches refer to County cricket matches and international one-day matches.

They also played a one-day series against Ireland. These games were played between the five matches played in the Ashes series.

Australia also played in the NatWest Series with England and Pakistan.

== Australia team ==
=== Coach ===
The coach of the team was John Buchanan, who coached the team between 1999 and 2007. Buchanan had previously led the Queensland cricket team to their first Sheffield Shield title. In his tenure as coach, Australia won three Cricket World Cups.

=== Captain ===
The Australian team was captained by Steve Waugh who had captained the side since 1999 to what cricket editor S Rajesh described as their "most successful peak in decades".

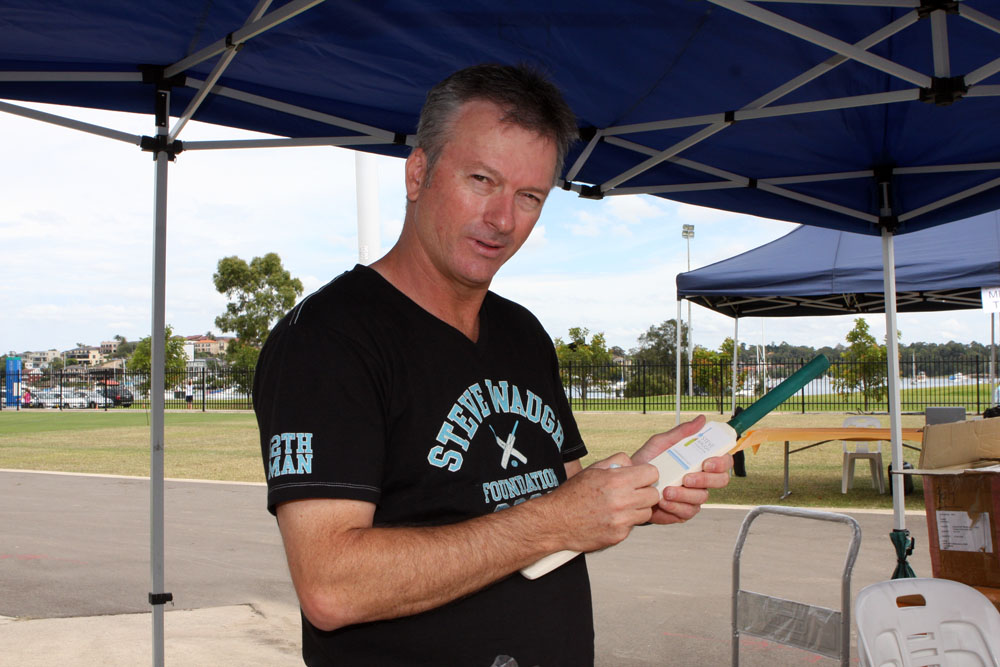
Steve Waugh. Former Australian Cricket Captain – captained the side to success in the 2001 Ashes Series

Vice-captain was wicketkeeper Adam Gilchrist, who was described as "instrumental" to the team's success. The Australian batting side was headed by Damien Martyn, with the "Dream Team", bowling side including Brett Lee, Shane Warne, Glenn McGrath and Jason Gillespie.

=== Selection before the Tour ===
Much of the team prior to the series had been playing in English County Cricket competitions. Through this, they made up 6 of the top 12 run scorers in two county divisions.

During the selection of the team, batsman Justin Langer was originally not chosen by Steve Waugh. However, Justin Langer replaced Michael Slater for the last match of the Ashes series.

The selection committee for the 2001 team was Trevor Hohns, Andrew Hilditch, David Boon and Allan Border. All four were the selection committee from 2000 to 2005.

=== Changes to the team ===
Due to the success of the team during the series the team remained unchanged between the tests. Between the 3rd and 4th Tests, Steve Waugh was injured after tearing his calf midway through the 3rd test but returned after a 19-day therapy plan.

The team had been successful previously holding a record of 16 consecutive wins between 1999 and 2001. In the series Gilchrist, Martyn, and both Waugh brothers made nearly 1500 runs together. McGrath and Warne were described as "unstoppable", combining 63 wickets at 18, becoming "one of the most dominant one-two acts" in an Ashes series.

The Australian team had 17 players. In a poll by the Australian Cricket Network among cricket fans, 7 players were named as the "Best Australian Ashes players". Hayden, Langer, Ponting, Waugh, Gilchrist, Warne and McGrath all featured.

=== Australia squad ===
Steve Waugh	Adam Gilchrist	Damien Fleming	Jason Gillespie	Matthew Hayden
Justin Langer	Brett Lee	Simon Katich	Damien Martyn	Glenn McGrath
Colin Miller	Ashley Noffke	Ricky Ponting	Wade Seccombe	Michael Slater
Shane Warne	Mark Waugh			

=== England Team ===
Nasser Hussain	Usman Afzaal	Michael Atherton	Mark Butcher	Andy Caddick
Dominic Cork	Robert Croft	Darren Gough	Matthew Hoggard	Alec Stewart
Mark Ramprakash	Marcus Trescothick	Ian Ward	Graham Thorpe	Craig White
Ashley Giles	Chris Silverwood	Richard Johnson	Alan Mullally	

== Injury ==
=== General ===
According to a study on the 2001 international cricket season, injuries ranged from 19.0 injuries per 10,000 players in domestic matches to 38.5 injuries per 10,000 players in One Day Internationals. This is, however, an average of Australian teams. Within the 2001 international matches there were 22.2 injuries per 10 000 player hours. Studies done on injuries in cricket rely on the definition of injuries being made clear, either incorporating any reasons for a player to miss a match or criteria for an injury including the roles a player may have in a series.

=== Team injuries ===
Originally in the team party, Nathan Bracken was chosen to play in the one-day tests but injured a shoulder. Ashley Noffke was brought in to replace him but was replaced himself after damaging ankle ligaments at a practise. Brett Lee then was brought in to play in the one-day series, as well as the Tests.

Steve Waugh injured himself between the Second and Third tests in the Ashes series, in a promotional game of squash between Waugh and No 1 Squash player Sarah Fitz-Gerald for the 2002 Commonwealth Games in Manchester. He began to play in the Third Test but ripped his calf in the game having a 5-centimetre tear. Waugh missed the Fourth Test, but together with the Australian physio, he devised and successfully followed a 19-day recovery plan in order to return for the final test.

== Ireland tour ==
Captain Steve Waugh did not travel for the Ireland leg of the tour due to his calf injury. Adam Gilchrist was also not in Ireland, so Ponting was named captain for the series. In the team, Hayden and Mark Waugh had played in 1993 in Dublin, while Waugh, Langer, Ponting and McGrath had all played in Eglinton in 1997.

The Irish team had no players from the 1993 competition but Derek Heasley, Andy Patterson and Kyle McCallan had both played in 1997.

== England tour ==
Australia played six other first-class and three other List A games.

In the first-class games Damien Martyn had the highest batting average with an average of 104.66 runs per game, with 9 games played. He also had the most runs between the English and Australian teams with 942 runs, followed by Ponting, Gilchrist and Mark Waugh with 844, 663 and 644 runs respectively.

Shane Warne took the most wickets in the first-class games with 42 wickets. He also took the most catches in the first-class series with 13 overall, followed by Mark Waugh and Ponting with 12 and 11.

Adam Gilchrist took the most dismissals with 31, beating Seccombe with 10.

=== Worcestershire vs Australians ===
1–3 June 2001
Scorecard

Australians	v	Worcestershire
351 (87.2 overs); Damien Martyn 108 (149); Christopher Liptrot 3/37 (17 overs)		163 (63.4 overs); Anurag Singh 62 (117); Nathan Bracken 3/29 (13 overs)
360/8d (67 overs); Ricky Ponting 65 (62); Matthew Rawnsley 3/108 (24 overs)		188 (57.3 overs); David Leatherdale 72 (113); Glenn McGrath 4/31 (12.3 overs)

Australians won by 360 runs
New Road, Worcester
Umpires: Michael Dixon (Eng) and Allan Jones (Eng)

- Australia won the toss and elected to bat.

=== M.C.C vs Australia ===
25–27 June 2001
Scorecard

Australians	v	M.C.C
390 (74.5 overs); Simon Katich 168* (167); Joe Dawes 4/74 (19 overs)		124 (38.3 overs); Mark Richardson 64 (115); Colin Miller 4/41 (8.3 overs)
294/8d (78 overs); Steve Waugh 105 (127); Charl Willoughby 3/66 (21 overs)		280 (72.2 overs); Jimmy Adams 81* (140); Colin Miller 3/87 (23 overs)

Australians won by 280 runs
Arundel Castle Cricket Ground, Arundel
Umpires: Tony Clarkson (Eng) and Neil Bainton (Eng)

- Australians won the toss and elected to bat.

=== Essex vs Australia ===
29 June–1 July 2001
Scorecard

Australians	v	Essex
405/5d (87 overs); Adam Gilchrist 150* (149); Justin Bishop 2/70 (18 overs)		231 (64 overs); James Foster 74 (115); Jason Gillespie 5/37 (16 overs)
569/9d (120 overs); Matthew Hayden 98 (109); Peter Such 5/131 (39 overs)

Match drawn.
County Ground, Chelmsford
Umpires: Ian Gould (Eng) and Trevor Jesty (Eng)

- Australians won the toss and elected to bat.

=== Somerset vs Australia ===
13–16 July 2001
Scorecard

Australians	v	Somerset
348/3d (74 overs); Ricky Ponting 129 (130); Jason Kerr 1/52 (17 overs)		267 (68.2 overs); Aamer Sohail 50 (120); Damien Fleming 6/59 (17 overs)
335/4d (81 overs); Damien Martyn 176* (231); Shoaib Akhtar 2/9 (7 overs)		240 (70 overs); Mike Burns 59 (96); Simon Katich 3/21 (4 overs)

Australians won by 176 runs
County Ground, Taunton
Umpires: Michael Dixon (Eng) and Mervyn Kitchen (Eng)

- Australians won the toss and elected to bat.

=== Hampshire vs Australia ===
28–30 July 2001
Scorecard

Australians	v	Hampshire
97 (30.4 overs); Ashley Noffke 28 (52); Alan Mullally 5/18 (11.4 overs)		354 (114.1 overs); Robin Smith 113 (277); Ashley Noffke 3/66 (22.1 overs)
389/9d (109.1 overs); Matthew Hayden 142 (215); Shaun Udal 4/149 (47.1 overs)		134/8 (24.3 overs); Neil Johnson 37 (29); Shane Warne 4/31 (5 overs)

Hampshire won by 2 wickets
The Rose Bowl, Southampton
Umpires: John Steele (Eng) and Bob White (Eng)

- Hampshire won the toss and elected to field.

=== Sussex vs Australia ===
8–10 August 2001
Scorecard

Sussex	v	Australians
355/4d (91 overs); Richard Montgomerie 157 (266); Damien Fleming 2/67 (20 overs)		86/2d (21 overs); Michael Slater 46* (70); Billy Taylor 2/39 (4 overs)
67/5d (20 overs); Murray Goodwin 28* (28); Damien Fleming 3/20 (8 overs)		339/2 (63.5 overs); Ricky Ponting 147* (170); Jason Lewry 1/52 (11 overs)

Australians won by 8 wickets
County Ground, Hove
Umpires: Graham Burgess (Eng) and Nigel Llong (Eng)

- Australians won the toss and elected to field.
- Australians target was set to 337 to score minimum of 68 overs to win.

=== Middlesex vs Australians ===
5 June 2001
Scorecard

Australians; 232 (44.2 overs)	v	Middlesex; 233/4 (47.1 overs)
Ian Harvey 84 (65); Paul Weekes 3/36 (10 overs)		Ben Hutton 73 (105); Ian Harvey 1/36 (10 overs)

Middlesex won by 6 wickets
Lord's, London
Umpires: Barrie Leadbeater (Eng) and Alan Whitehead (Eng)

- Middlesex won the toss and elected to field.

=== Northamptonshire vs Australians ===
7 June 2001
Scorecard

Australians; 234/3 (50 overs)	v	Northamptonshire; 234 (50 overs)
Damien Martyn 101* (131); Darren Cousins 2/27 (10 overs)		Michael Hussey 73 (106); Michael Bevan 2/24 (4 overs)

Match tied
County Ground, Northampton
Umpires: Nigel Cowley (Eng) and David Shepherd (Eng)

- Northamptonshire won the toss and elected to field.

=== Other One Day: Ireland vs Australians ===
12 August 2001
Scorecard

Ireland	v	Australians; 86/1 (23.4 overs)
		Matthew Hayden 52* (74); Conor Armstrong 1/21 (4.4 overs)

No result
Ormeau Cricket Ground, Belfast
Umpires: Ernest Cooke (Eng) and Trevor Henry (Ire)

- Ireland won the toss and elected to field.
- Match was abandoned due to heavy rain.

== The Ashes Series ==
=== 1st Test ===
5–8 July
Scorecard

England	v	Australia
294 (65.3 overs); Alec Stewart 65 (82); Shane Warne 5/71 (19 overs)		576 (129.4 overs); Adam Gilchrist 152 (143); Mark Butcher 4/42 (9 overs)
164 (42.1 overs); Marcus Trescothick 76 (113); Shane Warne 3/29 (10.1 overs)

Australia won by an innings and 118 runs
Edgbaston, Birmingham
Umpires: Steve Bucknor (WI) and George Sharp (Eng)
Player of the match: Adam Gilchrist (Aus)

- Australia won the toss and elected to field.
- Usman Afzaal (Eng) made his Test debut.

England was all out for less than 300 runs in the first innings, despite a 103-run partnership between Alec Stewart and Andy Caddick for the 10th wicket. England collapsed in the second innings from 142/2 to be all out for 164.

=== 2nd Test ===
19–22 July
Scorecard

England	v	Australia
187 (63.3 overs); Michael Atherton 37 (92); Glenn McGrath 5/54 (24 overs)		401 (101.1 overs); Mark Waugh 108 (170); Andy Caddick 5/101 (32.1 overs)
227 (66 overs); Mark Butcher 83 (159); Jason Gillespie 5/53 (16 overs)		14/2 (3.1 overs); Matthew Hayden 6* (8); Darren Gough 1/5 (2 overs)

Australia won by 8 wickets
Lord's, London
Umpires: Steve Bucknor (WI) and John Holder (Eng)
Player of the match: Glenn McGrath (Aus)

- Australia won the toss and elected to field.

=== 3rd Test ===
2–4 August
Scorecard

England	v	Australia
185 (52.5 overs); Marcus Trescothick 69 (93); Glenn McGrath 5/49 (18 overs)		190 (54.5 overs); Adam Gilchrist 54 (59); Alex Tudor 5/44 (15.5 overs)
162 (57 overs); Michael Atherton 51 (104); Shane Warne 6/33 (18 overs)		158/3 (29.2 overs); Mark Waugh 42* (45); Robert Croft 1/8 (1 over)

Australia won by 7 wickets
Trent Bridge, Nottingham
Umpires: John Hampshire (Eng) and Srinivasaraghavan Venkataraghavan (Ind)
Player of the match: Shane Warne (Aus)

- England won the toss and elected to bat.

Shane Warne was named man of the match for 8 wickets. Adam Gilchrist took 10 fours and made 54 with Gillespie taking 27. In the first innings they were all out for 122. Shane Warne took 6 for 33 in the first innings with Jason Gillespie taking 3 low order wickets making England out for 162. Steve Waugh had to retire from the game due to injury.

=== 4th Test ===
16–20 August
Scorecard

Australia	v	England
447 (100.1 overs); Ricky Ponting 144 (154); Darren Gough 5/103 (25.1 overs)		309 (94.2 overs); Alec Stewart 76* (83); Glenn McGrath 7/76 (30.2 overs)
176/4d (39.3 overs); Ricky Ponting 72 (72); Darren Gough 2/68 (17 overs)		315/4 (73.2 overs); Mark Butcher 173* (227); Jason Gillespie 2/94 (22 overs)

England won by 6 wickets
Headingley, Leeds
Umpires: David Shepherd (Eng) and Srinivasaraghavan Venkataraghavan (Ind)
Player of the match: Mark Butcher (Eng)

- Australia won the toss and elected to bat.
- Simon Katich (Aus) made his Test debut.

Australia held a lead of 138 after the first innings. In the second innings, Australia declared on 176/4, setting England a target of 315 for victory. They reached this with six wickets in hand, thanks to an unbeaten 173 by Mark Butcher. Butcher was named Player of the Match, for what Gilchrist described as "one of the great Ashes innings".

=== 5th Test ===
23–27 August
Scorecard

Australia	v	England
641/4d (152 overs); Steve Waugh 157* (256); Usman Afzaal 1/49 (9 overs)		432 (118.2 overs); Mark Ramprakash 133 (232); Shane Warne 7/165 (44.2 overs)
		184 (68.3 overs) (f/o); Darren Gough 39* (57); Glenn McGrath 5/43 (15.3 overs)

Australia won by an innings and 25 runs
The Oval, London
Umpires: Rudi Koertzen (SA) and Peter Willey (Eng)
Player of the match: Shane Warne (Aus)

- Australia won the toss and elected to bat.
- Jimmy Ormond (Eng) made his Test debut.

Having batted first, Australia led by 209 after the first innings, and forced England to follow on. Over England's two innings, Glenn McGrath took 7 wickets overall. In England's first innings, they scored 432 runs and in the second took 184.

Shane Warne was described as Player of the Match, with Mark Butcher and Glenn McGrath named as Players of the Series.

== Players of the Series ==
=== Australian – Glenn McGrath ===
During the 2001 Ashes series, McGrath passed Dennis Lillie's record of 355 dismissals, becoming the highest wicket taker among Australian fast bowlers. He still holds that record, having extended it to 563 Test wickets. Internationally, he is third only to England's James Anderson with 704 and Stuart Broad with 604.

McGrath played all five matches in the Ashes series. He bowled the most maiden overs with 56, 14 ahead of Jason Gillespie on 42. He bowled 194.2 overs, conceding 542 runs. McGrath took the most wickets through the series with 32 with best figures of 7/76. The 2001 Ashes was described as a display of his consistent style.

=== English – Mark Butcher ===
Butcher had not played for England since their tour to South Africa in 1999–2000, missing five straight tours between January 2000 and July 2001. However, a resurgence in form led to a call-up for the Ashes series.

He played in all five Tests, but after scoring just 14 runs across the two innings in the 3rd Test, he was due to be dropped for the 4th; however, the team's captain for the 2nd and 3rd tests, Michael Atherton, intervened and Butcher kept his place in the team. He went on to score 173 not out in the second innings in a performance described as "amazing", as England went on to win the match by 6 wickets. It was termed by Adam Gilchrist, the Australian wicket keeper, as "one of the great Ashes innings".

== External sources ==
- Tour results at Cricinfo.com
- CricketArchive – tour itineraries

== Annual reviews ==
- Playfair Cricket Annual 2002
- Wisden Cricketers' Almanack 2003
