= Ian Ward (cricketer) =

English cricketer and commentator

Personal information
- Full name: Ian James Ward
- Born: 30 September 1972 (age 54); Plymouth, Devon,
- Nickname: Stumpy, The Chimp, The Gnome, Cocker
- Height: 5 ft 8 in (1.73 m)
- Batting: Left-handed
- Bowling: Right-arm medium

International information
- National side: England
- Test debut (cap 605): 17 May 2001 v Pakistan
- Last Test: 2 August 2001 v Australia

Domestic team information
- Years: Team
- 1992: Surrey
- 1997–2003: Surrey
- 2004–2005: Sussex

Career statistics
| Competition | Test | FC | LA | T20 |
|---|---|---|---|---|
| Matches | 5 | 138 | 160 | 18 |
| Runs scored | 129 | 8,575 | 4,059 | 351 |
| Batting average | 16.12 | 40.25 | 28.99 | 23.40 |
| 100s/50s | 0/0 | 23/43 | 2/27 | 0/2 |
| Top score | 39 | 168* | 136 | 50 |
| Balls bowled | – | 319 | 149 | – |
| Wickets | – | 3 | 2 | – |
| Bowling average | – | 65.66 | 90.50 | – |
| 5 wickets in innings | – | 0 | 0 | – |
| 10 wickets in match | – | 0 | 0 | – |
| Best bowling | – | 1/1 | 2/27 | – |
| Catches/stumpings | 1/– | 72/– | 34/– | 4/– |
- Source: Cricinfo, 14 July 2020

Ian James Ward (born 30 September 1972) is a British broadcaster and former professional cricketer. A left-handed batsman and occasional right-arm medium bowler for Surrey and Sussex, Ward played 5 times for the England Test team all in 2001 under the captaincy of future Sky sports colleague Nasser Hussain. Since retiring from professional cricket in 2005, he has worked for Sky Sports as a cricket commentator and presenter.

== Early life ==
Ward was educated at Millfield.

== Playing career ==
Ward made his professional debut for Surrey in 1992, but was released by the county at the end of the 1992 season, aged 20. Without a county for the following five years, he worked as a petrol station attendant, barman and aircraft cleaner, while continuing to play club cricket. In 1997, Ward rejoined Surrey, becoming part of the side that won the County Championship three times between 1999 and 2002. His form for Surrey earned him a call-up to the 2000-01 England A tour of the West Indies where he scored 689 runs at an average of 68.90, including three centuries.

He made his Test debut against Pakistan at Lord's in 2001, scoring 39 runs in an England victory by an innings and 9 runs. Ward struggled in his second Test, scoring only 12 and 10 runs in a 108 run defeat to Pakistan at Old Trafford. He retained his place, however, for the beginning of the 2001 Ashes series against Australia. Ward made 23 and 3 runs in the first Test of the series at Edgbaston, before scoring 23* and a duck in the second Test at Lord's. His final Test appearance came in the third match of the 2001 Ashes series at Trent Bridge, scoring 6 and 13 runs. England lost the Test by 7 wickets, which meant Australia retained The Ashes with two Tests to spare.

Having scored 6,923 runs for Surrey at an average of 40.01, including 17 centuries, Ward left the county for a second time in 2003, opting to join Sussex for the 2004 season. After scoring a further 6 centuries across two seasons, he announced his retirement from professional cricket in 2005, in order to pursue a career in broadcasting.

== Broadcasting career ==
Ward first worked for Sky Sports during its coverage of the 2001 England tour of Sri Lanka. Yet to make his Test debut at the time, he was employed at short notice upon the recommendation of Mark Butcher, the England batsmen and teammate of Ward at Surrey.

After his retirement from professional cricket in 2005, Ward sought to forge a full-time career in broadcasting. A brief stint as an anchor on Sky Sports News followed, as did increasingly frequent appearances on Sky Sports' cricket coverage. By the 2013 Ashes series, Ward had become an integral part of cricket coverage on Sky Sports. During that series, he anchored coverage from the 'Ashes Zone', which, drawing upon his professional cricket experience, saw Ward and guests perform detailed technical analysis.

Following the 2013 Ashes series, Ward's prominence on Sky Sports' cricket coverage continued to increase, with Ward regularly presenting One Day International and Twenty20 International matches, as well as overseas tours, in lieu of David Gower, the primary presenter of international cricket on Sky Sports. In 2019, Ward presented coverage of the 2019 Cricket World Cup on Sky Sports, and was one of only six British commentators to be heard on global broadcast coverage of the tournament.

In 2020, Ward succeeded Gower as the primary presenter of international cricket on Sky Sports.
