= Zimbabwean cricket team in England in 2000 =

The Zimbabwean cricket team in England in 2000 played 9 first-class matches including 2 Tests. They also played in 7 limited overs internationals.

The first-class matches besides the two Tests were against Hampshire, Kent, Essex, Yorkshire, West Indians, Gloucestershire and British Universities.

England won the Test series against Zimbabwe, winning 1 of the matches with the other 1 drawn.

== Test series summary ==
=== First Test ===
18–21 May 2000
(5-day match)
Scorecard

| Zimbabwe | v | England |
| 83 (30.3 overs); A Flower 24 (38); ESH Giddins 5/15 (7 overs) | | 415 (135.5 overs); AJ Stewart 124* (283); HH Streak 6/87 (35.5 overs) |
| 123 (38.2 overs); BC Strang 37* (37); AR Caddick 4/38 (16.2 overs) |

England won by an innings and 209 runs
Lord's, London
Umpires: DL Orchard (SA) and P Willey (ENG)
Player of the match: ESH Giddins (ENG)

- England won the toss and elected to field.
- The match was scheduled for five days but completed in four.
- CP Schofield (ENG) made his Test debut.

=== Second Test ===
1–5 June 2000
(5-day match)
Scorecard

| England | v | Zimbabwe |
| 374 (135.2 overs); MA Atherton 136 (330); ML Nkala 3/82 (31 overs) | | 285/4d (82.3 overs); MW Goodwin 148* (250); D Gough 3/66 (20 overs) |
| 147 (75 overs); MA Atherton 34 (94); GJ Whittall 3/14 (8 overs) | | 25/1 (5 overs); GJ Whittall 12* (18); AR Caddick 1/9 (2 overs) |

Match drawn
Trent Bridge, Nottingham
Umpires: MJ Kitchen (ENG) and DL Orchard (SA)
Player of the match: MW Goodwin (ZIM)

- England won the toss and elected to field.
- There was no play on the second day.
- ML Nkala (ZIM) made his Test debut.

== External sources ==
CricketArchive
