= West Indian cricket team in England in 2000 =

West Indies in England 2000
	West Indies	England
- Dates: 2 June – 4 September 2000
Captains	Jimmy Adams	Nasser Hussain

Test series
- Result: England won the 5-match series 3–1
Most runs	Sherwin Campbell (270)	Michael Atherton (311)
Most wickets	Courtney Walsh (34)	Darren Gough (25)
- Player of the series: Courtney Walsh (WI), Darren Gough (Eng)

The West Indies cricket team toured England in the 2000 cricket season. West Indies played five Tests against England - two in June and three in August - with a triangular One Day International (ODI) series involving Zimbabwe in July.

In June, West Indies won the 1st Test at Edgbaston convincingly, before England narrowly won the 2nd Test at Lord's, having bowled West Indies out for 54 in their second innings.

The ODI series, sponsored by NatWest, took place in July, with England, West Indies and Zimbabwe all playing each other three times, and the two best teams qualifying for the final. West Indies lost four of their six matches, including all three against Zimbabwe. England beat Zimbabwe in the final at Lord's, thus winning an ODI tournament for the first time in two years.

The Test series concluded in August. After the 3rd Test at Old Trafford was drawn, England won the 4th Test at Headingley inside two days, bowling West Indies out for 61 in their second innings. They then won the 5th Test at The Oval, thus securing their first series victory against West Indies for 31 years.

In all five Tests and the ODI series, West Indies were captained by Jimmy Adams. Nasser Hussain captained England in the 1st Test before breaking a thumb while playing for Essex; Alec Stewart deputised in the 2nd Test and for much of the ODI series before Hussain returned.

The ball dominated the bat for most of the Test series, with a bowler taking five wickets in an innings on seven occasions (Courtney Walsh twice for West Indies, Andy Caddick and Craig White twice each and Darren Gough once for England), but only three batsmen scoring centuries (Stewart and Brian Lara in the drawn 3rd Test, and Michael Atherton in the 5th). A hallmark of the series was the inconsistency of the West Indies batting: the team passed 300 runs only twice, and were twice dismissed in the second innings for less than 70 runs. England only passed 300 once, in the 3rd Test, but consistently recorded scores between 150 and 300.

Atherton scored the most runs for either team (311), while Marcus Trescothick, who made his Test debut in the 3rd Test, headed the batting averages with 47.50. Sherwin Campbell scored the most runs for West Indies (270), while Ramnaresh Sarwan had the team's best batting average (40.75).

Walsh took the most wickets for either team (34), thus becoming the first winner of the Malcolm Marshall Memorial Trophy; he was also named West Indies' player of the series. Gough took the most wickets for England (25), and was his team's player of the series. While Gough was well supported by Caddick (22) and Dominic Cork (20), Walsh took twice as many wickets as his long-time partner Curtly Ambrose (17), who retired from cricket after the 5th Test.

== Test series ==
=== 1st Test ===
15–17 June 2000
Scorecard

England	v	West Indies
179 (69 overs); Nick Knight 26 (56); Courtney Walsh 5/36 (21 overs)		397 (136.5 overs); Jimmy Adams 98 (299); Darren Gough 5/109 (36.5 overs)
125 (58 overs); Nick Knight 34 (103); Courtney Walsh 3/22 (19 overs)

West Indies won by an innings and 93 runs
Edgbaston Cricket Ground, Birmingham
Umpires: David Shepherd (Eng) and Srinivas Venkataraghavan (Ind)
Player of the match: Courtney Walsh (WI)

- West Indies won the toss and elected to field.

=== 2nd Test ===
29 June – 1 July 2000
Scorecard

West Indies	v	England
267 (89.3 overs); Sherwin Campbell 82 (155); Dominic Cork 4/39 (24 overs)		134 (48.2 overs); Alec Stewart 28 (68); Curtly Ambrose 4/30 (14.2 overs)
54 (26.4 overs); Ridley Jacobs 12 (23); Andy Caddick 5/16 (13 overs)		191/8 (69.5 overs); Michael Atherton 45 (143); Courtney Walsh 6/74 (23.5 overs)

England won by 2 wickets
Lord's Cricket Ground, London
Umpires: John Hampshire (Eng) and Srinivas Venkataraghavan (Ind)
Player of the match: Dominic Cork (Eng)

- England won the toss and elected to field.
- This was the 100th Test match played at Lord's.
- The second day saw a part of all four innings: the final ball of West Indies' first innings, the entire England first innings and the entire West Indies second innings, and the first seven balls of England's second innings. Courtney Walsh became the first player in Test Match history who has batted and bowled in all 4 innings of a Test on the same day. He was later joined by Peter Siddle in the 1st Test between Australia and South Africa at Newlands Cricket Ground in 2011.
- Matthew Hoggard (Eng) made his Test debut.

=== 3rd Test ===
3–7 August 2000
Scorecard

West Indies	v	England
157 (71.1 overs); Ramnaresh Sarwan 36 (100); Dominic Cork 4/23 (17.1 overs)		303 (97.2 overs); Alec Stewart 105 (153); Courtney Walsh 4/50 (27 overs)
438/7d (155 overs); Brian Lara 112 (158); Craig White 2/67 (27 overs)		80/1 (33.4 overs); Marcus Trescothick 38* (101); Courtney Walsh 1/19 (14 overs)

Match drawn
Old Trafford Cricket Ground, Manchester
Umpires: Doug Cowie (NZ) and Peter Willey (Eng)
Player of the match: Alec Stewart (Eng)

- West Indies won the toss and elected to bat.
- Marcus Trescothick (Eng) made his Test debut.

=== 4th Test ===
17–18 August 2000
Scorecard

West Indies	v	England
172 (48.4 overs); Ramnaresh Sarwan 59* (82); Craig White 5/57 (14.4 overs)		272 (81.5 overs); Michael Vaughan 76 (132); Curtly Ambrose 4/42 (18 overs)
61 (26.2 overs); Jimmy Adams 19 (43); Andy Caddick 5/14 (11.2 overs)

England won by an innings and 39 runs
Headingley Cricket Ground, Leeds
Umpires: Doug Cowie (NZ) and George Sharp (Eng)
Player of the match: Michael Vaughan (Eng)

- West Indies won the toss and elected to bat.
- This was the first Test match to be won inside two days since 1946, and the first to be won by England in this manner since 1912.
- Curtly Ambrose took his 400th Test wicket during England's innings.

=== 5th Test ===
31 August – 4 September 2000
Scorecard

England	v	West Indies
281 (123.4 overs); Michael Atherton 83 (214); Courtney Walsh 3/68 (35.4 overs)		125 (50.5 overs); Nixon McLean 29 (46); Craig White 5/32 (11.5 overs)
217 (108 overs); Michael Atherton 108 (331); Courtney Walsh 4/73 (38 overs)		215 (70 overs); Brian Lara 47 (104); Andy Caddick 4/54 (21 overs)

England won by 158 runs
The Oval, London
Umpires: Daryl Harper (Aus) and David Shepherd (Eng)
Player of the match: Michael Atherton (Eng)

- West Indies won the toss and elected to field.
- Mahendra Nagamootoo (WI) made his Test debut, while Curtly Ambrose played his 98th and final Test match.

== External sources ==
- 2000 tours from CricketArchive
- Test series from Cricinfo
- ODI series from Cricinfo
- Test statistics from Cricinfo
