= 1999 County Championship =

English cricket tournament

- Dates: 13 April – 18 September 1999
- Administrator: England and Wales Cricket Board
- Cricket format: First-class cricket
- Tournament format: League system
- Champions: Surrey (16th title)
- Participants: 18
- Matches: 153
- Most runs: Stuart Law, (Essex); 1,833
- Most wickets: Alamgir Sheriyar, (Worcestershire); 86

The 1999 PPP Healthcare County Championship was the 100th officially organised running of the Championship.

It was the last County Championship to be run as a single division. The decision was made to split the championship into two divisions, with the top nine teams from the 1999 season to populate the first division in 2020, and the bottom nine teams going into the second division.

The sponsorship by Britannic Assurance came to an end with PPP (Private Patients Plan) Healthcare taking over and Surrey won the Championship.

== Table ==
- 12 points for a win
- 4 points for a draw

	Team	P	W	L	D	Bat	Bowl	Pts
1	Surrey	17	12	0	5	36	64	264
2	Lancashire	17	8	4	5	37	55	208
3	Leicestershire	17	5	3	9	43	61	200
4	Somerset	17	6	4	7	38	56	194
5	Kent	17	6	4	7	34	60	194
6	Yorkshire	17	8	6	3	21	64	193
7	Hampshire	17	5	5	7	45	58	191
8	Durham	17	6	7	4	34	66	188
9	Derbyshire	17	7	8	2	34	61	187
10	Warwickshire	17	6	5	6	35	56	187
11	Sussex	17	6	5	6	29	60	185
12	Essex	17	5	7	5	38	63	181
13	Northamptonshire	17	4	7	6	35	64	171
14	Glamorgan	17	5	7	5	26	57	163
15	Worcestershire	17	4	6	7	18	65	159
16	Middlesex	17	4	5	8	24	53	157
17	Nottinghamshire	17	4	11	2	27	57	140
18	Gloucestershire	17	2	9	6	26	62	136

= Champions and qualified for First Division in 2000
= Qualified for First Division in 2000
