= Alan Mullally =

English cricketer

Personal information
- Full name: Alan David Mullally
- Born: 12 July 1969 (age 57); Southend-on-Sea, Essex, England
- Height: 6 ft 5 in (1.96 m)
- Batting: Right-handed
- Bowling: Left-arm fast-medium
- Role: Bowler

International information
- National side: England (1996–2001)
- Test debut (cap 578): 6 June 1996 v India
- Last Test: 20 August 2001 v Australia
- ODI debut (cap 142): 29 August 1996 v Pakistan
- Last ODI: 21 June 2001 v Australia

Domestic team information
- Years: Team
- 1987–1990: Western Australia
- 1988: Hampshire
- 1990–1999: Leicestershire
- 2000–2005: Hampshire (squad no. 11)

Career statistics
Competition	Test	ODI	FC	LA
Matches	19	50	230	307
Runs scored	127	86	1,615	547
Batting average	5.52	5.73	8.59	7.01
100s/50s	0/0	0/0	0/2	0/0
Top score	24	20	75	38
Balls bowled	4,525	2,699	43,645	15,301
Wickets	58	63	708	362
Bowling average	31.24	27.42	28.18	27.65
5 wickets in innings	1	0	31	3
10 wickets in match	0	0	4	0
Best bowling	5/105	4/18	9/93	6/38
Catches/stumpings	6/–	8/–	44/–	44/–
- Source: Cricinfo, 12 August 2009

Alan Mullally (born 12 July 1969) is an English former first-class cricketer, who played Tests and ODIs. Mullally grew up in Western Australia, and played for the Australian Under-19 side against their West Indian counterparts in 1987/88.

== Domestic career ==
That same season he made his first-class debut for Western Australia in their Sheffield Shield final victory over Queensland at Perth. He stayed with Western Australia for another couple of seasons, with variable success.

Meanwhile, he had made his Hampshire debut, against Oxford University in May 1988. He did not take a wicket in that match, and he spent the rest of the English summer in Hampshire's second team. A more productive time followed back in Australia in 1988/89 as he took 23 first-class wickets, including seven in an innings victory in an MG Kailis-Kemplast Trophy game against Tamil Nadu at Perth.

Mullally did not play in England in 1989, and the 1989/90 Australian season was something of a disappointment as he took just 11 first-class wickets, but in 1990 Mullally returned to county cricket with Leicestershire, doing reasonably well with the highlight a haul of 6–38 (which remains his best in List A cricket) in a one-day game against the touring New Zealanders in June. That winter he returned to Australia, playing just a single game for Victoria.

For several years Mullally performed steadily with Leicestershire, capped in 1993 and taking between 40 and 70 first-class wickets a season while playing in the great majority of the county's games. His most successful year during this period was 1996, when he claimed 70 first-class wickets and, perhaps more startling for a man renowned throughout his career for his incompetence with the bat, made his only two first-class fifties, both at number 11: he scored 68 against Surrey in June, then followed it up in September with 75 against Middlesex.

In 2000 he returned to Hampshire, where he had begun his career in England, and he and Shane Warne carried the county's bowling attack almost by themselves in a difficult season for the club; that August he recorded his best bowling figures of 9–93 against Derbyshire (following up with 5–95 in the second innings for match figures of 14–188), although the game was drawn.

Mullally continued to be a regular pick in the Hampshire side for the next few years, averaging under 20 with the ball in both 2000 and 2001, and claiming five-wicket hauls on six occasions in the latter season, but from 2003 onwards his performances began to fall away, especially in first-class cricket in which he took only 35 wickets in 2003 and 2004 combined. His county persevered with him for some while, and in 2004 he took 22 List A wickets, but the award of a benefit season in 2005 could not disguise his decline and after a friendly against Kent and three totesport League matches in April and May, he dropped out of the first team entirely. At the end of the 2005 season he announced his retirement.

== International career ==
In 1996 also, he was selected by England for the first Test against India at Edgbaston. He took five wickets in the match as England won by eight wickets, and played in all six Tests that summer against India and Pakistan, as well as in three One Day Internationals against the latter opponents. It was to be in ODIs where Mullally was to make his mark as an England cricketer, not so much for his penetration as for his accuracy: his economy rate was so good that at one time he was listed as the second-best bowler in the world in that form of the game.

Mullally was in and out of the Test side from then on, his best period being 1998/99, when he took 12 Australian wickets in four Ashes Tests at 30.33, including his career-best 5–105 at Brisbane Cricket Ground, and the following home series against New Zealand, when he claimed 11 wickets at 27.27 from three games. In limited-overs cricket, however, he was still considered a central part of the team, and he took 10 wickets at just 17.60 in the 1999 World Cup, second in England's averages (just behind Darren Gough) and with the best economy rate of any English bowler in the competition.

In June 2001 he played his final ODI against Australia at The Oval, and conceded 27 runs from his four overs as England were crushed by eight wickets, and also his last Test against the same opponents at Headingley when recalled for a single time in August, having played his previous Test match against South Africa in January 2000.

Mullally was a poor batsman, and more often than not occupied the No. 11 position in the England batting line-up. However, he struck an aggressive 16 off 15 balls, including 3 cross-batted fours off Glenn McGrath, to help England to a 12-run win against Australia at Melbourne in 1998/99. His highest Test score of 24 against Pakistan featured several airborne boundaries off Wasim Akram. Allegedly the then England coach David Lloyd had offered Mullally 30 pints of Guinness to score 30 in that match.
