= George Sharp (cricketer) =

English cricketer and umpire

Personal information
- Full name: George Sharp
- Born: 12 February 1950 (age 76); West Hartlepool, England
- Nickname: Blunt, Razor, Sharpie
- Height: 5 ft 11 in (1.80 m)
- Batting: Right-handed
- Bowling: Left-arm medium
- Role: Wicket-keeper

Domestic team information
- Years: Team
- 1968–1985: Northamptonshire County Cricket Club

Umpiring information
- Tests umpired: 15 (1996–2002)
- ODIs umpired: 31 (1996–2001)
- WODIs umpired: 2 (2007–2011)
- WT20Is umpired: 2 (2006–2012)
- FC umpired: 301 (1992–2015)

Career statistics
Competition	First-class	List A
Matches	306	285
Runs scored	6,254	2,377
Batting average	19.85	15.74
100s/50s	0/50	0/1
Top score	98	51*
Balls bowled	114	–
Wickets	1	–
Bowling average	70	–
5 wickets in innings	0	–
10 wickets in match	0	–
Best bowling	1/47	–
Catches/stumpings	565/90	242/50
- Source: Cricinfo, 6 March 2009

George Sharp (born 12 March 1950) is an English former first-class cricketer and umpire. He was born at West Hartlepool, County Durham.

== Playing career ==
Sharp spent 17 years at Northamptonshire and played more than 300 games, as a wicketkeeper batsman, hitting 50 half-centuries in his career, but never managing to get a century, his highest score being 98.

== Umpiring career ==
Sharp umpired 15 Tests and 31 One Day Internationals. He umpired over 300 matches in First-class and List A cricket. Sharp continued to umpire matches in England until 2015, when he turned 65. ECB policy requires all umpires to retire when they reach this age, in order to allow younger umpires to gain employment. Sharp and fellow Northamptonshire team-mate and umpire Peter Willey challenged this decision at an employment tribunal, alleging age discrimination on the part of the ECB, but lost their case.

== See also ==
- List of Test cricket umpires
- List of One Day International cricket umpires
