= Mervyn Kitchen =

English cricketer (born 1940)

Personal information
- Full name: Mervyn John Kitchen
- Born: 1 August 1940 (age 86); Nailsea, Somerset, England
- Batting: Left-handed
- Bowling: Right-arm medium
- Role: Batsman

Domestic team information
- Years: Team
- 1960–1979: Somerset
- FC debut: 28 May 1960 Somerset v Middlesex
- Last FC: 23 June 1979 Somerset v Cambridge University
- LA debut: 22 May 1963 Somerset v Glamorgan
- Last LA: 17 June 1979 Somerset v Essex

Umpiring information
- Tests umpired: 20 (1990–2000)
- ODIs umpired: 28 (1983–2001)
- WODIs umpired: 3 (2000–2005)

Career statistics
Competition	First-class	List A
Matches	354	172
Runs scored	15,230	3,388
Batting average	26.25	22.43
100s/50s	17/68	1/12
Top score	189	116
Balls bowled	181	125
Wickets	2	5
Bowling average	54.50	19.40
5 wickets in innings	0	0
10 wickets in match	0	0
Best bowling	1/4	2/34
Catches/stumpings	157/–	52/–
- Source: CricketArchive, 10 October 2009

Mervyn John Kitchen (born 1 August 1940), is a former English first-class cricketer and international umpire. In his playing days he was a left-handed batsman for Somerset County Cricket Club, making 15,230 runs in his 354 first-class games between 1960 and 1979. He topped the Somerset averages in 1966 and 1968. After retiring as a player, he went on to become a first-class cricket umpire. He umpired in 20 Test matches and 28 One-Day Internationals before retiring from that at the age of 65 in 2005.

== Background and early cricket career ==
Kitchen was born in Nailsea, Somerset where his father played local club cricket. He was educated locally at Backwell Secondary Modern School. He joined the playing staff at Somerset County Cricket Club as a 16-year-old in 1957 and appeared in the next three seasons for the county's second eleven in Minor Counties matches and, from 1959, in games in the newly constituted Second Eleven Championship.

He made his debut for the Somerset first eleven in 1960 as a middle-order batsman, but made little impact in that or the next season, and in 1962 and 1963, although he played in around half of Somerset's first-class matches, his batting average was below 20 and his place was often dependent on injuries to other players. At this stage in his career, he was primarily a defensive batsman "which suited neither his temperament, for he was not a selfish man, nor his technique", according to one history of Somerset cricket. He played in most of Somerset's matches in the 1964 season and finally averaged more than 20 runs per innings, but returned to inconsistent performances and an uncertain place in the team in 1965.

== Somerset regular ==
At the end of the 1965 season, Peter Wight, who had been a fixture in the Somerset side since 1955, batting at No 3, but whose form had declined markedly in the previous three seasons, was not re-engaged for the following year. The resulting vacancy in the Somerset batting line-up in 1966 was filled by Kitchen and he responded with his most successful season, finishing top of the county's batting averages with 1422 runs in all first-class matches. The batting style had changed as well, and Kitchen was a much more attacking player than he had been, exemplified by an innings in July in a non-first-class match against the International Cavaliers team at Bath, where he won the match by hitting both of the last two balls of a 38-over match from the South African Test bowler Neil Adcock for six. After this innings, Kitchen became a much more confident batsman and in the space of just over a week at the end of the season he made his first two first-class centuries and was awarded his county cap: "Until then in 142 innings he had not scored a century and had averaged under 20," says the history of Somerset cricket.

== See also ==
- List of Test cricket umpires
- List of One Day International cricket umpires
