= Darren Gough =

English cricketer (born 1970)

Darren Gough MBE
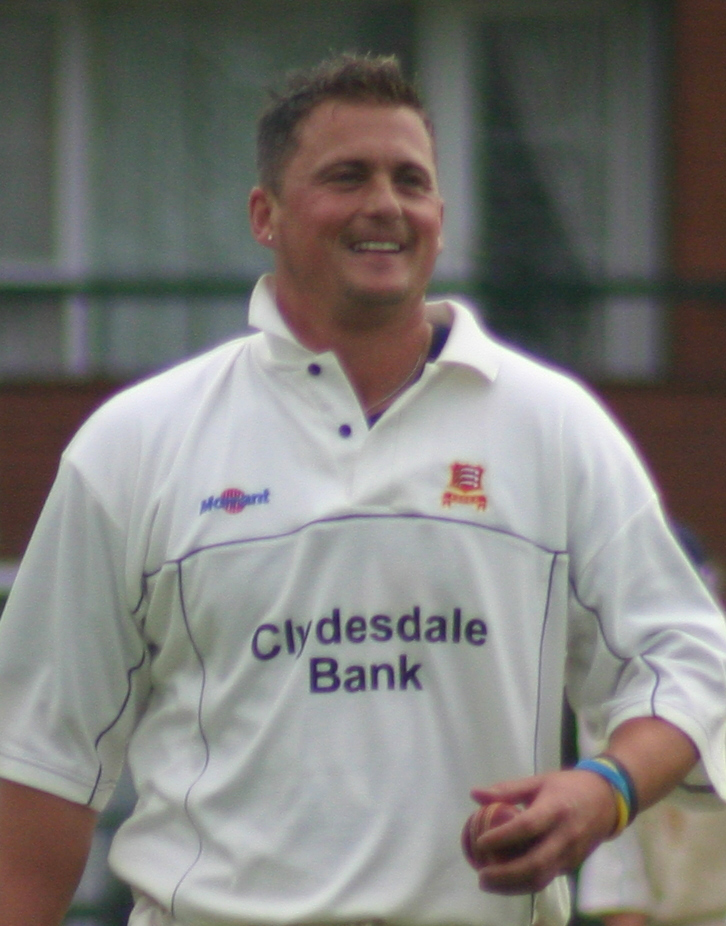
- Gough in 2005

Personal information
- Born: 18 September 1970 (age 56); Monk Bretton, Yorkshire, England
- Nickname: Rhino, Dazzler
- Height: 5 ft 11 in (1.80 m)
- Batting: Right-handed
- Bowling: Right-arm fast
- Role: Fast bowler

International information
- National side: England (1994–2006)
- Test debut (cap 568): 30 June 1994 v New Zealand
- Last Test: 31 July 2003 v South Africa
- ODI debut (cap 126): 19 May 1994 v New Zealand
- Last ODI: 2 September 2006 v Pakistan
- ODI shirt no.: 8
- T20I debut (cap 3): 13 June 2005 v Australia
- Last T20I: 28 August 2006 v Pakistan
- T20I shirt no.: 8

Domestic team information
- Years: Team
- 1989–2003: Yorkshire
- 2004–2006: Essex
- 2007–2008: Yorkshire

Career statistics
Competition	Test	ODI	FC	LA
Matches	58	159	248	420
Runs scored	855	609	4,607	2,092
Batting average	12.57	12.42	17.31	13.94
100s/50s	0/2	0/0	1/20	0/2
Top score	65	46*	121	72*
Balls bowled	11,821	8,470	44,023	20,665
Wickets	229	235	855	598
Bowling average	28.39	26.42	27.15	24.17
5 wickets in innings	9	2	33	7
10 wickets in match	0	0	3	0
Best bowling	6/42	5/44	7/28	7/27
Catches/stumpings	13/–	25/–	51/–	73/–
- Source: ESPNcricinfo, 19 February 2017

Darren Gough MBE (born 18 September 1970) is a retired English cricketer and former captain of Yorkshire County Cricket Club. The spearhead of England's bowling attack through much of the 1990s, he is England's second highest wicket-taker in one-day internationals with 235, and took 229 wickets in his 58 Test matches, making him England's ninth-most-successful wicket-taker.

Gough was a right arm fast bowler and right-handed batsman. At 5 feet 11 inches in height and broad in beam, he achieved his pace from a good approach to the wicket and a leaping sideways-on action, achieving what was often described as "skiddy" fast bowling. Capable of swinging the ball late, many of his wickets were gained through lbw or bowled, often with an inswinging yorker delivery.

Gough retired at the end of the 2008 cricket season with Justin Langer as his final first-class wicket. He won the third series of Strictly Come Dancing in 2005.

== Domestic cricket ==
Gough was offered a contract by football club Rotherham United but chose cricket. He made his first class debut in 1989 against Middlesex at Lord's taking five wickets. He won his county cap in 1993 after taking 7/42 against Somerset.

Gough played county cricket for 15 years for Yorkshire and was a member of their 2001 squad that won the 2001 County Championship – its first in 33 years. In 2004 he moved to Essex and returned to Yorkshire for the 2007 season as their captain.

Gough retired in 2008.

His only First-Class century came against Warwickshire in 1996 at Headingley.

== International cricket ==
=== 1994 England vs New Zealand ===
After a breakout season in 1993, Gough went on an A tour to South Africa, following by making his Test debut for England against New Zealand at Old Trafford. Gough was England's 568th Test cricketer. With a wicket in his first over and his highest Test score of 65 it was quite the debut.

=== 1994 England vs South Africa ===
Gough retained his place for his first full home series against South Africa. Gough started well with a pair of four wickets in the first Test and would pick up another 3 to be leading English wicket taker in the series. He played in his first Test victory in the third Test. In the second innings he took the only wicket that Devon Malcolm didn't take when he took 9/57. With the bat he averaged 40 for the series.

=== 1994–95 Australia vs England ===
On the back of this, Gough was a member of his first Ashes squad. With the England team thoroughly outclassed, Gough played a solo hand taking 20 wickets at 21.25. The highlight was five wickets in an innings and scoring a 50 in Sydney where he was also man of the match.

There was a break for the limited over series – Gough injured his foot bowling his first ball in a match at the MCG and was taken to hospital. X-rays revealed a stress fracture in his foot and he missed the final two Tests of the series.

=== 1995 England vs West Indies ===
Gough returned for this series playing in the first three of the six Test series. After six wickets in the first two tests he was wicketless in the third.

=== 1995–1996 South Africa vs England ===
Gough was wicketless in the first two Tests of the series.

=== 1996–1997 Zimbabwe vs England ===
Gough played in both tests of the two Test series, the first of which was the first match in the history of Test cricket to finish in a draw with the scores level. With three runs needed from the final ball, Nick Knight while batting with Gough was run out attempting the game winning third run.

=== 1996–1997 New Zealand vs England ===
Gough played all three Tests of the series. In the second Test he took five and four wickets for his best match figures of 9/92.

=== 1997 England vs Australia ===
Gough played in the first four Tests of the series. England started full of energy winning the First Test at Edgbaston. It was the only live Ashes Test England would win between 1987 and 2005. Gough took six wickets in the first Test and would take 10 in the next four. Once again injury prevented Gough from playing as an inflamed knee caused him to miss the final two tests.

=== 1998 England vs South Africa ===
Gough was back for the South African series and played in the four of the five tests. England was down 1–0 with 2 to play. Only down 1–0 thanks to Gough's heroics at Old Trafford where he batted over an hour with Robert Croft to save the game for England.

England won the Fourth Test to level the series 1–1. The series was heading for a grand finale at Headingley, Gough's home ground. Chasing 219 for victory, South Africa were 5/27 when Gough took the wickets of Gary Kirsten, Gerhardus Liebenberg and Daryl Cullinan. Gough took his 100th career wicket when he had Jonty Rhodes caught. The final morning began with South Africa needing 34 runs with 2 wickets in hand. Gough dismissed Makhaya Ntini to seal the game. Gough finished with 6/42 his best innings figures in test cricket. It was England's first home five-Test series win since 1985.

=== 1998 England vs Sri Lanka ===
Following that England played Sri Lanka for a one-off test at The Oval. It was the first time in 50 years that England lost after scoring more than 440 in the first innings. England collapsed badly on the final day losing 8/127 in 87 overs. Gough batted for 133 balls and 145 minutes in resisting but was Muttiah Muralitharan's 9th wicket of the innings.

=== 1998–99 Australia vs England ===
It was a return down under for the Ashes. Gough played in all five Tests of the series. Gough took 10 wickets in the first three Tests but would secure cricketing immortality in the final two Tests.

In the 4th Test in Melbourne, Australia, chasing 175 for victory, were 3/130 but a collapse of 4/0 left them struggling. Steve Waugh and Matthew Nicholson took Australia to 161 before Dean Headley dismissed Nicholson. Stuart MacGill faced the final ball of that Headley over. With the first ball of the next over, Steve Waugh took a single off Gough. Gough bowled MacGill with a searing yorker that hit the base of middle stump and two balls later had Glenn McGrath lbw to give England a 12 run win. It was Gough's only Test Victory in Australia and was remembered by his exuberant celebrations of shaking a stump over his head.

Four days later the 5th Test began in Sydney. Australia batted first and moved to 6/321. Wicketless until then, Gough had Ian Healy caught behind, next ball he ripped out MacGill's middle stump and with his final ball of the over bowled Colin Miller. It was the first Ashes hat trick by an Englishman in almost a 100 years and the first hat trick taken in Sydney in almost 107 years.

Gough was the leading English wicket taker for the series with 21.

=== 1999–2000 South Africa vs England ===
It was almost a year until Gough would next play Test cricket as England toured South Africa. Gough played all five Tests of the series. South Africa were leading 2–0 heading into the Fifth Test which became one of the most infamous tests in cricket history. With no play possible on Days 2, 3 and 4, Cronje and Hussain agreed to forfeit an innings to give England a final day run chase of 249. It later turned out that Cronje was bribed 50,000 rand to ensure a result. Gough hit the winning runs to give England the 2 wicket victory.

=== 2000 Zimbabwe vs England ===
Gough played both Tests in the 2 match series against Zimbabwe taking 9 wickets.

=== 2000 England vs West Indies ===
Statistically this was Gough's finest series. He took 25 wickets – his most in any series and was named joint player of the series with Courtney Walsh. England won the series 3–1 giving them their first series victory against the West Indies in 31 years.

West Indies won the first Test at Edgbaston by an innings and 93 runs. The West Indies continued their momentum into the 2nd Test at Lords when they took a 133 run lead into the second innings. West Indies were bowled out for 54 to give England a chase of 188. From 1/95 England collapsed to 8/160. Gough joined Dominic Cork with 28 still needed for victory. Gough was still there when Cork hit the winning runs.

The Third Test was a draw before England won the Fourth Test in 2 days. Gough took 7 wickets for the match.

In the Fifth Test, England had too much momentum for a fatigued visitors who lost by 158 runs. Gough took four wickets for the match including the vital wicket of Brian Lara – the fifth time he dismissed him in the series.

=== 2000–01 Pakistan vs England ===
England toured Pakistan for a Three Test series. After the first two matches were drawn, England won the third in fading light to record their first Test victory and first Test series victory in Pakistan in almost 40 years. Gough took 10 wickets for the series.

=== 2000–01 Sri Lanka vs England ===
England continued on their winning ways with a 2–1 series victory in Sri Lanka. England bounced back after losing the first Test. Gough took 14 wickets for the series, the most by an English player.

=== 2001 England vs Pakistan ===
The 2 test series was tied 1–1. Gough played in both matches and took 14 wickets. His 5/61 in his 50th test not only put him on the honours board but was also his 200th Test wicket.

=== 2001 England vs Australia ===
Australia came for the Ashes. Gough played in all 5 Tests and took 17 wickets, the most by an Englishman. Australia won the series 4–1 with England's win coming in the 4th Test.

=== 2003 England vs South Africa ===
After almost 2 years out of Test cricket, Gough returned to play South Africa. The first Test was a draw and South Africa won the second by an innings and 92 runs. Gough only took one wicket.

The rigors of Test match cricket were proving too much for Gough's body and he retired.

== One Day International Cricket ==
Gough made his one-day debut for England against New Zealand taking 2/36 from 11 overs at Birmingham in 42 run win.

=== 1996 World Cup ===
Gough played in all six of England's matches in the 1996 World Cup. He took a collective 4/238 from 51 overs.

=== 1999 World Cup ===
Gough played in all five of England's matches and had 11/192 from 48.4 overs.

== T20I Cricket ==
Gough only played 2 T20I matches. Against Australia in 2005 and Pakistan in 2006.

== Legacy ==
England only won 18 times in the 58 times Gough played. Gough played Australia 17 times and was only on the winning team 3 times. This combined with his many injuries meant his exploits weren't always associated with winning Test Matches. "The few times it was, there was no better cricketer in the world. Just as he was hitting his peak his body betrayed him and he constantly battled knee injuries."

Gough played 146 first-class matches for Yorkshire, taking 453 wickets at 27.56. He took 290 wickets in 212 List A games at 23.34 and 16 wickets in 17 Twenty20 appearances at 26.00. Of his 229 dismissals, Ricky Ponting and Michael Slater featured the most – eight times each.

== Coaching and administrative career ==
In October 2019, Gough was appointed as a fast bowling consultant for England cricket team for test matches against New Zealand. In December 2021, Gough was appointed the director of cricket for Yorkshire. He left the role in March 2024. In November 2024, Gough was appointed as the head coach of Lahore Qalandars for the upcoming 2024 Global Super League in Guyana.

== After cricket ==
Gough after retirement, in April 2009

Gough was on a Question of Sport. Gough has been a radio presenter on talkSPORT since 2009. He co-presented the weekday afternoon drive-time show with Adrian Durham.

In 2005, Gough took part in the BBC television show Strictly Come Dancing, partnered with British National champion Lilia Kopylova. He was the first cricketer to win the show, a feat former teammate Mark Ramprakash would emulate the following year. He went on to win both the main series and the 2005 Christmas Special.Two years later he returned to win the 2007 Christmas Special. Following this he took part in the Strictly Come Dancing live tour during January and February 2008.

In 2009, Gough became the face of UK convenience store chain Costcutter, featuring in their TV adverts until 2011.

As an outspoken fan, Gough became the brand ambassador for Collier's Powerful Welsh cheddar in 2010 making a number of appearances notably at the International Cheese Awards in Nantwich.

== Personal life ==
Gough and his wife Anna divorced in 2002, after eight years of marriage but remarried in 2018; they have two sons. He was the best man at the wedding of Kevin Pietersen. Gough supports association football club Barnsley, and is a supporter of the Conservative Party. He was even approached by Prime Minister David Cameron to stand as an MP, although Gough declined the offer.

After retirement, he played village cricket for Drayton Parslow, in Buckinghamshire. As of 2015, he was still involved with the club and the local area.

== Honours ==
- His 234 ODI wickets is still the third most for England.
- First England bowler to take 200 ODI wickets
- Eighth England bowler to take 200 Test Wickets
- 6th Fastest England bowler to take 200 Test Wickets
- 1999 Wisden cricketer of the year
- 2000 Cornhill England player of the year
- 2001 Vodafone England cricket of the year

He was the subject of This Is Your Life in 2001 when he was surprised by Michael Aspel while launching a NatWest competition for junior cricketers at Lord's Cricket Ground.

In 2006, Gough was awarded an honorary degree by Huddersfield University in Barnsley. An honorary doctorate of civil law from the University of Huddersfield.

In the same year he was awarded honorary life membership by Yorkshire Cricket Club.

He was appointed Member of the Order of the British Empire (MBE) in the 2020 Birthday Honours for services to cricket and charity.

Preceded by Craig White	Yorkshire cricket captain 2007–2008	Succeeded by Anthony McGrath
