= List of England cricket captains =

This is a list of England cricket captains, comprising all the men, women and youths who have captained an England cricket team at official international level. The international match categories are Test, One Day International (ODI) and Twenty20 International (T20I).

International cricket began in 1877 when the England men's team played in the first-ever Test match. England have played more Test matches, and had more captains, than any other team. In the 19th century, the captains for overseas tours were chosen by the promoters. The early tours were mostly organised by professionals, especially James Lillywhite, Alfred Shaw and Arthur Shrewsbury. Some amateur-led tours went abroad under Lord Harris and Lord Hawke. Home captains were selected by the home ground authority, who often favoured a local player. For over 73 years, commencing with the 1903–04 tour of Australia and ending with the Centenary Test in 1977, Marylebone Cricket Club (MCC) organised international tours and selected the England team. On these tours, the team was called MCC in non-international matches and England in the internationals. MCC established a tradition of having amateur, rather than professional, captains. After Shrewsbury in 1886–87, there was no professional captain until Len Hutton in 1952. The amateur/professional distinction was abolished in 1962, though some former amateurs captained England after that. In 1971, Ray Illingworth captained England in their first ODI. In 1977, management of the England team was taken over by the former Test and County Cricket Board (TCCB) until 1 January 1997, and from then by the England and Wales Cricket Board (ECB). England played their first T20I in 2005 under the captaincy of Michael Vaughan.

The England Women's team made their international debut on the 1934–35 tour of Australia and New Zealand when they were captained by Betty Archdale. Women's internationals were played sporadically until the last quarter of the 20th century when ODIs became frequent. The first ODI match was played in 1973 when England Women were led by Rachael Heyhoe-Flint. England Women's first T20I was played in 2004 under the captaincy of Clare Connor.

The England under-19 cricket team began playing Test matches in 1974 and ODI matches in 1976. Their first captains were Nigel Briers and Chris Cowdrey respectively.

== Men's cricket ==
=== Test match captains ===
This is a list of cricketers who have captained the England men's team in at least one Test match. Where a player has a dagger (†) next to a Test match series in which he captained at least one Test, that denotes that player deputised for the appointed captain or was appointed for part of a series. The dagger classification follows that adopted by Wisden Cricketers' Almanack.

English Test match captains
Number	Name	Year	Report	Opposition	Location	Played	Won	Lost	Drawn
1	James Lillywhite	1876–77	Report	Australia	Australia	2	1	1	0
2	Lord Harris	1878–79	Report	Australia	Australia	1	0	1	0
2	Lord Harris	1880	Report	Australia	England	1	1	0	0
2	Lord Harris	1884	Report	Australia	England	2	1	0	1
2	Lord Harris	Total				4	2	1	1
3	Alfred Shaw	1881–82	Report	Australia	Australia	4	0	2	2
4	A N Hornby	1882	Report	Australia	England	1	0	1	0
4	A N Hornby	1884†	Report	Australia	England	1	0	0	1
4	A N Hornby	Total				2	0	1	1
5	Hon. Ivo Bligh	1882–83	Report	Australia	Australia	4	2	2	0
6	Arthur Shrewsbury	1884–85	Report	Australia	Australia	5	3	2	0
6	Arthur Shrewsbury	1886–87	Report	Australia	Australia	2	2	0	0
6	Arthur Shrewsbury	Total				7	5	2	0
7	Allan Steel	1886	Report	Australia	England	3	3	0	0
7	Allan Steel	1888†	Report	Australia	England	1	0	1	0
7	Allan Steel	Total				4	3	1	0
8	Walter Read	1887–88	Report	Australia	Australia	1	1	0	0
8	Walter Read	1891–92	Report	South Africa	South Africa	1	1	0	0
8	Walter Read	Total				2	2	0	0
9	W G Grace	1888	Report	Australia	England	2	2	0	0
9	W G Grace	1890	Report	Australia	England	2	2	0	0
9	W G Grace	1891–92	Report	Australia	Australia	3	1	2	0
9	W G Grace	1893	Report	Australia	England	2	1	0	1
9	W G Grace	1896	Report	Australia	England	3	2	1	0
9	W G Grace	1899†	Report	Australia	England	1	0	0	1
9	W G Grace	Total				13	8	3	2
10	C. Aubrey Smith	1888–89	Report	South Africa	South Africa	1	1	0	0
11	Monty Bowden (Note: Monty Bowden, aged 23 years 144 days, became England's youngest captain on 25 March 1889.)	1888–89†	Report	South Africa	South Africa	1	1	0	0
12	Andrew Stoddart	1893†	Report	Australia	England	1	0	0	1
12	Andrew Stoddart	1894–95	Report	Australia	Australia	5	3	2	0
12	Andrew Stoddart	1897–98	Report	Australia	Australia	2	0	2	0
12	Andrew Stoddart	Total				8	3	4	1
13	Sir Tim O'Brien	1895–96†	Report	South Africa	South Africa	1	1	0	0
14	Lord Hawke	1895–96	Report	South Africa	South Africa	2	2	0	0
14	Lord Hawke	1898–99	Report	South Africa	South Africa	2	2	0	0
14	Lord Hawke	Total				4	4	0	0
15	Archie MacLaren	1897–98†	Report	Australia	Australia	3	1	2	0
15	Archie MacLaren	1899	Report	Australia	England	4	0	1	3
15	Archie MacLaren	1901–02	Report	Australia	Australia	5	1	4	0
15	Archie MacLaren	1902	Report	Australia	England	5	1	2	2
15	Archie MacLaren	1909	Report	Australia	England	5	1	2	2
15	Archie MacLaren	Total				22	4	11	7
16	Plum Warner	1903–04	Report	Australia	Australia	5	3	2	0
16	Plum Warner	1905–06	Report	South Africa	South Africa	5	1	4	0
16	Plum Warner	Total				10	4	6	0
17	Hon. Stanley Jackson	1905	Report	Australia	England	5	2	0	3
18	Tip Foster	1907	Report	South Africa	England	3	1	0	2
19	Frederick Fane	1907–08†	Report	Australia	Australia	3	1	2	0
19	Frederick Fane	1909–10†	Report	South Africa	South Africa	2	1	1	0
19	Frederick Fane	Total				5	2	3	0
20	Arthur Jones	1907–08	Report	Australia	Australia	2	0	2	0
21	H D G Leveson-Gower	1909–10	Report	South Africa	South Africa	3	1	2	0
22	Johnny Douglas	1911–12 (Note: Plum Warner captained the touring party, but illness prevented him from appearing in any of the Tests)	Report	Australia	Australia	5	4	1	0
22	Johnny Douglas	1913–14	Report	South Africa	South Africa	5	4	0	1
22	Johnny Douglas	1920–21	Report	Australia	Australia	5	0	5	0
22	Johnny Douglas	1921†	Report	Australia	England	2	0	2	0
22	Johnny Douglas	1924†	Report	South Africa	England	1	0	0	1
22	Johnny Douglas	Total				18	8	8	2
23	C B Fry	1912	Report	South Africa	England	3	3	0	0
23	C B Fry	1912	Report	Australia	England	3	1	0	2
23	C B Fry	Total				6	4	0	2
24	Hon. Lionel Tennyson	1921	Report	Australia	England	3	0	1	2
25	Frank Mann (Note: George Mann was the son of Frank Mann, making them the first father and son to both captain England.)	1922–23	Report	South Africa	South Africa	5	2	1	2
26	Arthur Gilligan (Note: Arthur Gilligan and Harold Gilligan were the first brothers to captain England.)	1924	Report	South Africa	England	4	3	0	1
26	Arthur Gilligan	1924–25	Report	Australia	Australia	5	1	4	0
26	Arthur Gilligan	Total				9	4	4	1
27	Arthur Carr	1926	Report	Australia	England	4	0	0	4
27	Arthur Carr	1929†	Report	South Africa	England	2	1	0	1
27	Arthur Carr	Total				6	1	0	5
28	Percy Chapman	1926†	Report	Australia	England	1	1	0	0
28	Percy Chapman	1928	Report	West Indies	England	3	3	0	0
28	Percy Chapman	1928–29	Report	Australia	Australia	4	4	0	0
28	Percy Chapman	1930	Report	Australia	England	4	1	1	2
28	Percy Chapman	1930–31	Report	South Africa	South Africa	5	0	1	4
28	Percy Chapman	Total				17	9	2	6
29	Rony Stanyforth	1927–28	Report	South Africa	South Africa	4	2	1	1
30	Greville Stevens	1927–28†	Report	South Africa	South Africa	1	0	1	0
31	Jack White	1928–29†	Report	Australia	Australia	1	0	1	0
31	Jack White	1929	Report	South Africa	England	3	1	0	2
31	Jack White	Total				4	1	1	2
32	Harold Gilligan	1929–30 (Note: England had two overlapping Test series in the winter of 1929/30. Their first Test against New Zealand started on 10 January 1930. Their first Test against the West Indies started on 11 January 1930, making the first time England had simultaneously played two Test matches at once.)	Report	New Zealand	New Zealand	4	1	0	3
33	Hon. Freddie Calthorpe	1929–30	Report	West Indies	West Indies	4	1	1	2
34	Bob Wyatt	1930†	Report	Australia	England	1	0	1	0
34	Bob Wyatt	1932–33†	Report	New Zealand	New Zealand	1	0	0	1
34	Bob Wyatt	1933†	Report	West Indies	England	1	1	0	0
34	Bob Wyatt	1934	Report	Australia	England	4	1	1	2
34	Bob Wyatt	1934–35	Report	West Indies	West Indies	4	1	2	1
34	Bob Wyatt	1935	Report	South Africa	England	5	0	1	4
34	Bob Wyatt	Total				16	3	5	8
35	Douglas Jardine	1931	Report	New Zealand	England	3	1	0	2
35	Douglas Jardine	1932	Report	India	England	1	1	0	0
35	Douglas Jardine	1932–33	Report	Australia	Australia	5	4	1	0
35	Douglas Jardine	1932–33	Report	New Zealand	New Zealand	1	0	0	1
35	Douglas Jardine	1933	Report	West Indies	England	2	1	0	1
35	Douglas Jardine	1933–34	Report	India	India	3	2	0	1
35	Douglas Jardine	Total				15	9	1	5
36	Cyril Walters	1934†	Report	Australia	England	1	0	1	0
37	Gubby Allen	1936	Report	India	England	3	2	0	1
37	Gubby Allen	1936–37	Report	Australia	Australia	5	2	3	0
37	Gubby Allen	1947–48	Report	West Indies	West Indies	3	0	2	1
37	Gubby Allen	Total				11	4	5	2
38	Walter Robins	1937	Report	New Zealand	England	3	1	0	2
39	Wally Hammond	1938	Report	Australia	England	4	1	1	2
39	Wally Hammond	1938–39	Report	South Africa	South Africa	5	1	0	4
39	Wally Hammond	1939	Report	West Indies	England	3	1	0	2
39	Wally Hammond	1946	Report	India	England	3	1	0	2
39	Wally Hammond	1946–47	Report	Australia	Australia	4	0	2	2
39	Wally Hammond	1946–47	Report	New Zealand	New Zealand	1	0	0	1
39	Wally Hammond	Total				20	4	3	13
40	Norman Yardley	1946–47†	Report	Australia	Australia	1	0	1	0
40	Norman Yardley	1947	Report	South Africa	England	5	3	0	2
40	Norman Yardley	1948	Report	Australia	England	5	0	4	1
40	Norman Yardley	1950	Report	West Indies	England	3	1	2	0
40	Norman Yardley	Total				14	4	7	3
41	Ken Cranston	1947–48†	Report	West Indies	West Indies	1	0	0	1
42	George Mann	1948–49	Report	South Africa	South Africa	5	2	0	3
42	George Mann	1949	Report	New Zealand	England	2	0	0	2
42	George Mann	Total				7	2	0	5
43	Freddie Brown	1949†	Report	New Zealand	England	2	0	0	2
43	Freddie Brown	1950†	Report	West Indies	England	1	0	1	0
43	Freddie Brown	1950–51	Report	Australia	Australia	5	1	4	0
43	Freddie Brown	1950–51	Report	New Zealand	New Zealand	2	1	0	1
43	Freddie Brown	1951	Report	South Africa	England	5	3	1	1
43	Freddie Brown	Total				15	5	6	4
44	Nigel Howard	1951–52	Report	India	India	4	1	0	3
45	Donald Carr	1951–52†	Report	India	India	1	0	1	0
46	Len Hutton	1952	Report	India	England	4	3	0	1
46	Len Hutton	1953	Report	Australia	England	5	1	0	4
46	Len Hutton	1953–54	Report	West Indies	West Indies	5	2	2	1
46	Len Hutton	1954	Report	Pakistan	England	2	0	1	1
46	Len Hutton	1954–55	Report	Australia	Australia	5	3	1	1
46	Len Hutton	1954–55	Report	New Zealand	New Zealand	2	2	0	0
46	Len Hutton	Total				23	11	4	8
47	David Sheppard	1954†	Report	Pakistan	England	2	1	0	1
48	Peter May	1955	Report	South Africa	England	5	3	2	0
48	Peter May	1956	Report	Australia	England	5	2	1	2
48	Peter May	1956–57	Report	South Africa	South Africa	5	2	2	1
48	Peter May	1957	Report	West Indies	England	5	3	0	2
48	Peter May	1958	Report	New Zealand	England	5	4	0	1
48	Peter May	1958–59	Report	Australia	Australia	5	0	4	1
48	Peter May	1958–59	Report	New Zealand	New Zealand	2	1	0	1
48	Peter May	1959	Report	India	England	3	3	0	0
48	Peter May	1959–60	Report	West Indies	West Indies	3	1	0	2
48	Peter May	1961	Report	Australia	England	3	1	1	1
48	Peter May	Total				41	20	10	11
49	Colin Cowdrey (Note: Chris Cowdrey is the son of Colin Cowdrey, making them the second father and son to both captain England after George and Frank Mann.)	1959†	Report	India	England	2	2	0	0
49	Colin Cowdrey	1959–60†	Report	West Indies	West Indies	2	0	0	2
49	Colin Cowdrey	1960	Report	South Africa	England	5	3	0	2
49	Colin Cowdrey	1961†	Report	Australia	England	2	0	1	1
49	Colin Cowdrey	1962†	Report	Pakistan	England	1	1	0	0
49	Colin Cowdrey	1966	Report	West Indies	England	3	0	2	1
49	Colin Cowdrey	1967–68	Report	West Indies	West Indies	5	1	0	4
49	Colin Cowdrey	1968	Report	Australia	England	4	1	1	2
49	Colin Cowdrey	1968–69	Report	Pakistan	Pakistan	3	0	0	3
49	Colin Cowdrey	Total				27	8	4	15
50	Ted Dexter	1961–62	Report	Pakistan	Pakistan	3	1	0	2
50	Ted Dexter	1961–62	Report	India	India	5	0	2	3
50	Ted Dexter	1962	Report	Pakistan	England	4	3	0	1
50	Ted Dexter	1962–63	Report	Australia	Australia	5	1	1	3
50	Ted Dexter	1962–63	Report	New Zealand	New Zealand	3	3	0	0
50	Ted Dexter	1963	Report	West Indies	England	5	1	3	1
50	Ted Dexter	1964	Report	Australia	England	5	0	1	4
50	Ted Dexter	Total				30	9	7	14
51	M. J. K. Smith	1963–64	Report	India	India	5	0	0	5
51	M. J. K. Smith	1964–65	Report	South Africa	South Africa	5	1	0	4
51	M. J. K. Smith	1965	Report	New Zealand	England	3	3	0	0
51	M. J. K. Smith	1965	Report	South Africa	England	3	0	1	2
51	M. J. K. Smith	1965–66	Report	Australia	Australia	5	1	1	3
51	M. J. K. Smith	1965–66	Report	New Zealand	New Zealand	3	0	0	3
51	M. J. K. Smith	1966†	Report	West Indies	England	1	0	1	0
51	M. J. K. Smith	Total				25	5	3	17
52	Brian Close	1966†	Report	West Indies	England	1	1	0	0
52	Brian Close	1967	Report	India	England	3	3	0	0
52	Brian Close	1967	Report	Pakistan	England	3	2	0	1
52	Brian Close	Total				7	6	0	1
53	Tom Graveney	1968†	Report	Australia	England	1	0	0	1
54	Ray Illingworth (Note: The 1970 South Africa tour to England was called off and a Rest of the World XI was arranged to play a 5 match series to replace it. The games were originally regarded as Test matches, but were later stripped of Test status. The Rest of the World XI won the series 4–1, with Illingworth captaining England in each match.)	1969	Report	West Indies	England	3	2	0	1
54	Ray Illingworth	1969	Report	New Zealand	England	3	2	0	1
54	Ray Illingworth	1970–71 (Note: The third Test at the Melbourne Cricket Ground, Australia in 1970–71 was abandoned without a ball being bowled and is excluded from these statistics. This is in line with the approach adopted by Wisden and most statisticians, although the match has been recognised as an official Test match by the Australian Board of Control.)	Report	Australia	Australia	6	2	0	4
54	Ray Illingworth	1970–71	Report	New Zealand	New Zealand	2	1	0	1
54	Ray Illingworth	1971	Report	Pakistan	England	3	1	0	2
54	Ray Illingworth	1971	Report	India	England	3	0	1	2
54	Ray Illingworth	1972	Report	Australia	England	5	2	2	1
54	Ray Illingworth	1973	Report	New Zealand	England	3	2	0	1
54	Ray Illingworth	1973	Report	West Indies	England	3	0	2	1
54	Ray Illingworth	Total				31	12	5	14
55	Tony Lewis	1972–73	Report	India	India	5	1	2	2
55	Tony Lewis	1972–73	Report	Pakistan	Pakistan	3	0	0	3
55	Tony Lewis	Total				8	1	2	5
56	Mike Denness	1973–74	Report	West Indies	West Indies	5	1	1	3
56	Mike Denness	1974	Report	India	England	3	3	0	0
56	Mike Denness	1974	Report	Pakistan	England	3	0	0	3
56	Mike Denness	1974–75	Report	Australia	Australia	5	1	3	1
56	Mike Denness	1974–75	Report	New Zealand	New Zealand	2	1	0	1
56	Mike Denness	1975†	Report	Australia	England	1	0	1	0
56	Mike Denness	Total				19	6	5	8
57	John Edrich	1974–75†	Report	Australia	Australia	1	0	1	0
58	Tony Greig	1975	Report	Australia	England	3	0	0	3
58	Tony Greig	1976	Report	West Indies	England	5	0	3	2
58	Tony Greig	1976–77	Report	India	India	5	3	1	1
58	Tony Greig	1976–77	Report	Australia	Australia	1	0	1	0
58	Tony Greig	Total				14	3	5	6
59	Mike Brearley	1977	Report	Australia	England	5	3	0	2
59	Mike Brearley	1977–78	Report	Pakistan	Pakistan	2	0	0	2
59	Mike Brearley	1978	Report	Pakistan	England	3	2	0	1
59	Mike Brearley	1978	Report	New Zealand	England	3	3	0	0
59	Mike Brearley	1978–79	Report	Australia	Australia	6	5	1	0
59	Mike Brearley	1979	Report	India	England	4	1	0	3
59	Mike Brearley	1979–80	Report	Australia	Australia	3	0	3	0
59	Mike Brearley	1979–80	Report	India	India	1	1	0	0
59	Mike Brearley	1981	Report	Australia	England	4	3	0	1
59	Mike Brearley	Total				31	18	4	9
60	Geoffrey Boycott	1977–78†	Report	Pakistan	Pakistan	1	0	0	1
60	Geoffrey Boycott	1977–78	Report	New Zealand	New Zealand	3	1	1	1
60	Geoffrey Boycott	Total				4	1	1	2
61	Ian Botham	1980	Report	West Indies	England	5	0	1	4
61	Ian Botham	1980	Report	Australia	England	1	0	0	1
61	Ian Botham	1980–81	Report	West Indies	West Indies	4	0	2	2
61	Ian Botham	1981†	Report	Australia	England	2	0	1	1
61	Ian Botham	Total				12	0	4	8
62	Keith Fletcher	1981–82	Report	India	India	6	0	1	5
62	Keith Fletcher	1981–82	Report	Sri Lanka	Sri Lanka	1	1	0	0
62	Keith Fletcher	Total				7	1	1	5
63	Bob Willis	1982	Report	India	England	3	1	0	2
63	Bob Willis	1982	Report	Pakistan	England	2	2	0	0
63	Bob Willis	1982–83	Report	Australia	Australia	5	1	2	2
63	Bob Willis	1983	Report	New Zealand	England	4	3	1	0
63	Bob Willis	1983–84	Report	New Zealand	New Zealand	3	0	1	2
63	Bob Willis	1983–84†	Report	Pakistan	Pakistan	1	0	1	0
63	Bob Willis	Total				18	7	5	6
64	David Gower	1982†	Report	Pakistan	England	1	0	1	0
64	David Gower	1983–84	Report	Pakistan	Pakistan	2	0	0	2
64	David Gower	1984	Report	West Indies	England	5	0	5	0
64	David Gower	1984	Report	Sri Lanka	England	1	0	0	1
64	David Gower	1984–85	Report	India	India	5	2	1	2
64	David Gower	1985	Report	Australia	England	6	3	1	2
64	David Gower	1985–86	Report	West Indies	West Indies	5	0	5	0
64	David Gower	1986†	Report	India	England	1	0	1	0
64	David Gower	1989	Report	Australia	England	6	0	4	2
64	David Gower	Total				32	5	18	9
65	Mike Gatting	1986	Report	India	England	2	0	1	1
65	Mike Gatting	1986	Report	New Zealand	England	3	0	1	2
65	Mike Gatting	1986–87	Report	Australia	Australia	5	2	1	2
65	Mike Gatting	1987	Report	Pakistan	England	5	0	1	4
65	Mike Gatting	1987–88	Report	Pakistan	Pakistan	3	0	1	2
65	Mike Gatting	1987–88	Report	Australia	Australia	1	0	0	1
65	Mike Gatting	1987–88	Report	New Zealand	New Zealand	3	0	0	3
65	Mike Gatting	1988†	Report	West Indies	England	1	0	0	1
65	Mike Gatting	Total				23	2	5	16
66	John Emburey	1988	Report	West Indies	England	2	0	2	0
67	Chris Cowdrey	1988†	Report	West Indies	England	1	0	1	0
68	Graham Gooch	1988†	Report	West Indies	England	1	0	1	0
68	Graham Gooch	1988	Report	Sri Lanka	England	1	1	0	0
68	Graham Gooch	1989–90	Report	West Indies	West Indies	2	1	0	1
68	Graham Gooch	1990	Report	New Zealand	England	3	1	0	2
68	Graham Gooch	1990	Report	India	England	3	1	0	2
68	Graham Gooch	1990–91	Report	Australia	Australia	4	0	2	2
68	Graham Gooch	1991	Report	West Indies	England	5	2	2	1
68	Graham Gooch	1991	Report	Sri Lanka	England	1	1	0	0
68	Graham Gooch	1991–92	Report	New Zealand	New Zealand	3	2	0	1
68	Graham Gooch	1992	Report	Pakistan	England	5	1	2	2
68	Graham Gooch	1992–93	Report	India	India	2	0	2	0
68	Graham Gooch	1993	Report	Australia	England	4	0	3	1
68	Graham Gooch	Total				34	10	12	12
69	Allan Lamb	1989–90†	Report	West Indies	West Indies	2	0	2	0
69	Allan Lamb	1990–91†	Report	Australia	Australia	1	0	1	0
69	Allan Lamb	Total				3	0	3	0
70	Alec Stewart	1992–93†	Report	India	India	1	0	1	0
70	Alec Stewart	1992–93	Report	Sri Lanka	Sri Lanka	1	0	1	0
70	Alec Stewart	1998	Report	South Africa	England	5	2	1	2
70	Alec Stewart	1998	Report	Sri Lanka	England	1	0	1	0
70	Alec Stewart	1998–99	Report	Australia	Australia	5	1	3	1
70	Alec Stewart	2000†	Report	West Indies	England	1	1	0	0
70	Alec Stewart	2001†	Report	Pakistan	England	1	0	1	0
70	Alec Stewart	Total				15	4	8	3
71	Michael Atherton	1993†	Report	Australia	England	2	1	1	0
71	Michael Atherton	1993–94	Report	West Indies	West Indies	5	1	3	1
71	Michael Atherton	1994	Report	New Zealand	England	3	1	0	2
71	Michael Atherton	1994	Report	South Africa	England	3	1	1	1
71	Michael Atherton	1994–95	Report	Australia	Australia	5	1	3	1
71	Michael Atherton	1995	Report	West Indies	England	6	2	2	2
71	Michael Atherton	1995–96	Report	South Africa	South Africa	5	0	1	4
71	Michael Atherton	1996	Report	India	England	3	1	0	2
71	Michael Atherton	1996	Report	Pakistan	England	3	0	2	1
71	Michael Atherton	1996–97	Report	Zimbabwe	Zimbabwe	2	0	0	2
71	Michael Atherton	1996–97	Report	New Zealand	New Zealand	3	2	0	1
71	Michael Atherton	1997	Report	Australia	England	6	2	3	1
71	Michael Atherton	1997–98	Report	West Indies	West Indies	6	1	3	2
71	Michael Atherton	2001†	Report	Australia	England	2	0	2	0
71	Michael Atherton	Total				54	13	21	20
72	Nasser Hussain	1999	Report	New Zealand	England	3	1	2	0
72	Nasser Hussain	1999–2000	Report	South Africa	South Africa	5	1	2	2
72	Nasser Hussain	2000	Report	Zimbabwe	England	2	1	0	1
72	Nasser Hussain	2000	Report	West Indies	England	4	2	1	1
72	Nasser Hussain	2000–01	Report	Pakistan	Pakistan	3	1	0	2
72	Nasser Hussain	2000–01	Report	Sri Lanka	Sri Lanka	3	2	1	0
72	Nasser Hussain	2001	Report	Pakistan	England	1	1	0	0
72	Nasser Hussain	2001	Report	Australia	England	3	1	2	0
72	Nasser Hussain	2001–02	Report	India	India	3	0	1	2
72	Nasser Hussain	2001–02	Report	New Zealand	New Zealand	3	1	1	1
72	Nasser Hussain	2002	Report	Sri Lanka	England	3	2	0	1
72	Nasser Hussain	2002	Report	India	England	4	1	1	2
72	Nasser Hussain	2002–03	Report	Australia	Australia	5	1	4	0
72	Nasser Hussain	2003	Report	Zimbabwe	England	2	2	0	0
72	Nasser Hussain	2003†	Report	South Africa	England	1	0	0	1
72	Nasser Hussain	Total				45	17	15	13
73	Mark Butcher	1999†	Report	New Zealand	England	1	0	0	1
74	Michael Vaughan	2003	Report	South Africa	England	4	2	2	0
74	Michael Vaughan	2003–04	Report	Bangladesh	Bangladesh	2	2	0	0
74	Michael Vaughan	2003–04	Report	Sri Lanka	Sri Lanka	3	0	1	2
74	Michael Vaughan	2003–04	Report	West Indies	West Indies	4	3	0	1
74	Michael Vaughan	2004	Report	New Zealand	England	2	2	0	0
74	Michael Vaughan	2004	Report	West Indies	England	4	4	0	0
74	Michael Vaughan	2004–05	Report	South Africa	South Africa	5	2	1	2
74	Michael Vaughan	2005	Report	Bangladesh	England	2	2	0	0
74	Michael Vaughan	2005	Report	Australia	England	5	2	1	2
74	Michael Vaughan	2005–06	Report	Pakistan	Pakistan	2	0	1	1
74	Michael Vaughan	2007	Report	West Indies	England	3	3	0	0
74	Michael Vaughan	2007	Report	India	England	3	0	1	2
74	Michael Vaughan	2007–08	Report	Sri Lanka	Sri Lanka	3	0	1	2
74	Michael Vaughan	2007–08	Report	New Zealand	New Zealand	3	2	1	0
74	Michael Vaughan	2008	Report	New Zealand	England	3	2	0	1
74	Michael Vaughan	2008	Report	South Africa	England	3	0	2	1
74	Michael Vaughan	Total				51	26	11	14
75	Marcus Trescothick	2004†	Report	New Zealand	England	1	1	0	0
75	Marcus Trescothick	2005–06†	Report	Pakistan	Pakistan	1	0	1	0
75	Marcus Trescothick	Total				2	1	1	0
76	Andrew Flintoff	2005–06	Report	India	India	3	1	1	1
76	Andrew Flintoff	2006	Report	Sri Lanka	England	3	1	1	1
76	Andrew Flintoff	2006–07	Report	Australia	Australia	5	0	5	0
76	Andrew Flintoff	Total				11	2	7	2
77	Andrew Strauss	2006	Report	Pakistan	England	4	3	0	1
77	Andrew Strauss	2007†	Report	West Indies	England	1	0	0	1
77	Andrew Strauss	2008–09	Report	West Indies	West Indies	5	0	1	4
77	Andrew Strauss	2009	Report	West Indies	England	2	2	0	0
77	Andrew Strauss	2009	Report	Australia	England	5	2	1	2
77	Andrew Strauss	2009–10	Report	South Africa	South Africa	4	1	1	2
77	Andrew Strauss	2010	Report	Bangladesh	England	2	2	0	0
77	Andrew Strauss	2010	Report	Pakistan	England	4	3	1	0
77	Andrew Strauss	2010–11	Report	Australia	Australia	5	3	1	1
77	Andrew Strauss	2011	Report	Sri Lanka	England	3	1	0	2
77	Andrew Strauss	2011	Report	India	England	4	4	0	0
77	Andrew Strauss	2011–12	Report	Pakistan	UAE	3	0	3	0
77	Andrew Strauss	2011–12	Report	Sri Lanka	Sri Lanka	2	1	1	0
77	Andrew Strauss	2012	Report	West Indies	England	3	2	0	1
77	Andrew Strauss	2012	Report	South Africa	England	3	0	2	1
77	Andrew Strauss	Total				50	24	11	15
78	Kevin Pietersen	2008†	Report	South Africa	England	1	1	0	0
78	Kevin Pietersen	2008–09	Report	India	India	2	0	1	1
78	Kevin Pietersen	Total				3	1	1	1
79	Alastair Cook	2009–10	Report	Bangladesh	Bangladesh	2	2	0	0
79	Alastair Cook	2012–13	Report	India	India	4	2	1	1
79	Alastair Cook	2012–13	Report	New Zealand	New Zealand	3	0	0	3
79	Alastair Cook	2013	Report	New Zealand	England	2	2	0	0
79	Alastair Cook	2013	Report	Australia	England	5	3	0	2
79	Alastair Cook	2013–14	Report	Australia	Australia	5	0	5	0
79	Alastair Cook	2014	Report	Sri Lanka	England	2	0	1	1
79	Alastair Cook	2014	Report	India	England	5	3	1	1
79	Alastair Cook	2014–15	Report	West Indies	West Indies	3	1	1	1
79	Alastair Cook	2015	Report	New Zealand	England	2	1	1	0
79	Alastair Cook	2015	Report	Australia	England	5	3	2	0
79	Alastair Cook	2015–16	Report	Pakistan	UAE	3	0	2	1
79	Alastair Cook	2015–16	Report	South Africa	South Africa	4	2	1	1
79	Alastair Cook	2016	Report	Sri Lanka	England	3	2	0	1
79	Alastair Cook	2016	Report	Pakistan	England	4	2	2	0
79	Alastair Cook	2016–17	Report	Bangladesh	Bangladesh	2	1	1	0
79	Alastair Cook	2016–17	Report	India	India	5	0	4	1
79	Alastair Cook	Total				59	24	22	13
80	Joe Root	2017	Report	South Africa	England	4	3	1	0
80	Joe Root	2017	Report	West Indies	England	3	2	1	0
80	Joe Root	2017–18	Report	Australia	Australia	5	0	4	1
80	Joe Root	2017–18	Report	New Zealand	New Zealand	2	0	1	1
80	Joe Root	2018	Report	Pakistan	England	2	1	1	0
80	Joe Root	2018	Report	India	England	5	4	1	0
80	Joe Root	2018–19	Report	Sri Lanka	Sri Lanka	3	3	0	0
80	Joe Root	2018–19	Report	West Indies	West Indies	3	1	2	0
80	Joe Root	2019	Report	Ireland	England	1	1	0	0
80	Joe Root	2019	Report	Australia	England	5	2	2	1
80	Joe Root	2019–20	Report	New Zealand	New Zealand	2	0	1	1
80	Joe Root	2019–20	Report	South Africa	South Africa	4	3	1	0
80	Joe Root	2020	Report	West Indies	England	2	2	0	0
80	Joe Root	2020	Report	Pakistan	England	3	1	0	2
80	Joe Root	2020–21	Report	Sri Lanka	Sri Lanka	2	2	0	0
80	Joe Root	2020–21	Report	India	India	4	1	3	0
80	Joe Root	2021	Report	New Zealand	England	2	0	1	1
80	Joe Root	2021	Report	India	England	4	1	2	1
80	Joe Root	2021–22	Report	Australia	Australia	5	0	4	1
80	Joe Root	2021–22	Report	West Indies	West Indies	3	0	1	2
80	Joe Root	2026†	Report	New Zealand	England	1	0	1	0
80	Joe Root	2026	Report	Pakistan	England	3	3	0	0
80	Joe Root	Total				68	30	27	11
81	Ben Stokes	2020†	Report	West Indies	England	1	0	1	0
81	Ben Stokes	2022	Report	New Zealand	England	3	3	0	0
81	Ben Stokes	2022	Report	India	England	1	1	0	0
81	Ben Stokes	2022	Report	South Africa	England	3	2	1	0
81	Ben Stokes	2022–23	Report	Pakistan	Pakistan	3	3	0	0
81	Ben Stokes	2022–23	Report	New Zealand	New Zealand	2	1	1	0
81	Ben Stokes	2023	Report	Ireland	England	1	1	0	0
81	Ben Stokes	2023	Report	Australia	England	5	2	2	1
81	Ben Stokes	2024	Report	India	India	5	1	4	0
81	Ben Stokes	2024	Report	West Indies	England	3	3	0	0
81	Ben Stokes	2024–25†	Report	Pakistan	Pakistan	2	0	2	0
81	Ben Stokes	2024–25	Report	New Zealand	New Zealand	3	2	1	0
81	Ben Stokes	2025	Report	Zimbabwe	England	1	1	0	0
81	Ben Stokes	2025	Report	India	England	4	2	1	1
81	Ben Stokes	2025–26	Report	Australia	Australia	5	1	4	0
81	Ben Stokes	2026	Report	New Zealand	England	2	1	1	0
81	Ben Stokes	Total				44	24	18	2
82	Ollie Pope	2024†	Report	Sri Lanka	England	3	2	1	0
82	Ollie Pope	2024–25†	Report	Pakistan	Pakistan	1	1	0	0
82	Ollie Pope	2025†	Report	India	England	1	0	1	0
82	Ollie Pope	Total				5	3	2	0
Grand total						1100	408	336	356

Last updated: 16 September 2026

=== One Day International captains ===
This is a complete list of every man who has captained England in at least one One Day International.

The most successful captain in terms of win percentage, after a minimum of 10 games, is Mike Gatting. Eoin Morgan is the only captain to lead England to a trophy, taking England to victory in the 2019 Cricket World Cup.

Thirteen men (Alan Knott, Norman Gifford, Adam Hollioake, Graham Thorpe, Paul Collingwood, Eoin Morgan, Stuart Broad, James Taylor, Jos Buttler, Moeen Ali, Zak Crawley, Harry Brook, and Liam Livingstone) have captained the England ODI side without ever captaining the Test team.

The table of results is complete to the end of the 2026–27 Pakistan ODI Tri-Series in October 2026.

English ODI captains
Number	Name	Period of captaincy	Played	Won	Tied	Lost	No result
1	Ray Illingworth	1971–1973	3	1	0	1	1
2	Brian Close	1972	3	2	0	1	0
3	Mike Denness	1973–1975	12	7	0	4	1
4	John Edrich	1975	1	0	0	0	1
5	Alan Knott	1976	1	0	0	1	0
6	Tony Greig	1976	2	0	0	2	0
7	Mike Brearley	1977–1980	25	15	0	9	1
8	Geoffrey Boycott	1977–1978	2	2	0	0	0
9	Bob Willis	1978–1984	29	16	0	13	0
10	Ian Botham	1980–1981	9	4	0	5	0
11	Keith Fletcher	1981–1982	5	2	0	3	0
12	David Gower	1984–1989	24	10	1	13	0
13	Norman Gifford	1985	2	0	0	2	0
14	Mike Gatting	1986–1988	37	26	0	11	0
15	John Emburey	1987	4	2	0	2	0
16	Graham Gooch	1988–1993	50	24	0	23	3
17	Allan Lamb	1990	4	1	0	3	0
18	Alec Stewart	1992–2003	41	15	0	25	1
19	Mike Atherton	1994–1997	43	20	1	21	1
20	Nasser Hussain	1997–2003	56	28	0	27	1
21	Adam Hollioake	1997–1999	14	6	0	8	0
22	Graham Thorpe	2001	3	0	0	3	0
23	Marcus Trescothick	2001–2005	10	5	0	5	0
24	Michael Vaughan	2003–2007	60	32	2	22	4
25	Andrew Flintoff	2006–2007	14	4	0	10	0
26	Andrew Strauss	2006–2011	62	27	1	33	1
27	Paul Collingwood	2007–2009	25	11	1	12	1
28	Kevin Pietersen	2008	12	4	0	6	2
29	Alastair Cook	2010–2014	69	36	1	30	2
30	Eoin Morgan	2011–2022	126	76	2 (Note: Includes 2019 Cricket World Cup Final, which was tied after 50 overs and the Super Over, but England won the match on boundary count)	40	8
31	Stuart Broad	2014	3	2	0	1	0
32	James Taylor	2015	1	0	0	0	1
33	Jos Buttler	2016–2025	45	18	0	26	1
34	Ben Stokes	2021	3	3	0	0	0
35	Moeen Ali	2022	1	0	0	1	0
36	Zak Crawley	2023	2	1	0	0	1
37	Harry Brook	2024–2026	27	13	0	14	0
38	Liam Livingstone	2024	3	1	0	2	0
Grand total			833	414	9	379	31

=== Twenty20 International captains ===
England played their first Twenty20 International in June 2005. Eoin Morgan holds the record for the most games as captain of the England T20I team, with 72 which includes 42 victories. Harry Brook is the most successful captain in terms of win percentage, after a minimum of 10 games.

English Twenty20 International captains
No.	Name	Period	Played	Won	Tied	Lost	No Result
1	Michael Vaughan	2005–2007	2	1	0	1	0
2	Andrew Strauss	2006–2009	3	0	0	3	0
3	Paul Collingwood	2007–2010	30	17	0	11	2
4	Alastair Cook	2009	1	0	0	1	0
5	Stuart Broad	2011–2014	27	11	0	15	1
6	Graeme Swann	2011	3	2	0	1	0
7	Eoin Morgan	2012–2022	72	42	2 (Note: Both games finished with scores level, but England won the Super-over deciders)	27	1
8	James Tredwell	2013	1	0	0	0	1
9	Jos Buttler	2015–2025	51	26	0	22	3
10	Moeen Ali	2020–2023	12	5	0	7	0
11	Phil Salt	2024	2	1	0	1	0
12	Harry Brook	2025–2026	27	21	0	3	3
13	Jacob Bethell	2025	2	2	0	0	0
Grand total			233	128	2	92	11

=== Captains in men's ICC tournaments ===
English Captains in ICC Tournaments
Tournament	Name	Format	Played	Won	Lost	Tied/NR	Stand	Winning rate
1975 Cricket World Cup	Mike Denness	60 overs	4	3	1	0	Semi Finals	75%
1979 Cricket World Cup	Mike Brearley	60 overs	5	4	1	0	Runners-up	80%
1983 Cricket World Cup	Bob Willis	60 overs	7	5	2	0	Semi Finals	71.43%
1987 Cricket World Cup	Mike Gatting	50 overs	8	5	3	0	Runners-up	62.50%
1992 Cricket World Cup	Graham Gooch	50 overs	10	6	3	1	Runners-up	60%
1996 Cricket World Cup	Mike Atherton	50 overs	6	2	4	0	Quarter-Finals	33.33%
1998 ICC KnockOut Trophy	Adam Hollioake	50 overs	1	0	1	0	Quarter-Finals	0%
1999 Cricket World Cup	Alec Stewart	50 overs	5	3	2	0	Group Stage	60%
2000 ICC KnockOut Trophy	Nasser Hussain	50 overs	1	0	1	0	Quarter-Finals	0%
2002 ICC Champions Trophy	Nasser Hussain	50 overs	2	1	1	0	Group Stage	50%
2003 Cricket World Cup	Nasser Hussain	50 overs	6	3	3	0	Group Stage	50%
2004 ICC Champions Trophy	Michael Vaughan	50 overs	4	3	1	0	Runners-up	75%
2006 ICC Champions Trophy	Andrew Flintoff	50 overs	3	1	2	0	Group Stage	33.33%
2007 Cricket World Cup	Michael Vaughan	50 overs	9	5	4	0	Super 8	55.55%
2007 World Twenty20	Paul Collingwood	20 overs	5	1	4	0	Super 8	20%
2009 World Twenty20	Paul Collingwood	20 overs	5	2	3	0	Super 8	40%
2009 ICC Champions Trophy	Andrew Strauss	50 overs	4	2	2	0	Semi Finals	50%
2010 World Twenty20	Paul Collingwood	20 overs	7	5	1	1	Champions	71.43%
2011 Cricket World Cup	Andrew Strauss	50 overs	7	3	3	1	Quarter-Finals	42.86%
2012 World Twenty20	Stuart Broad	20 overs	5	2	3	0	Super 8	40%
2013 ICC Champions Trophy	Alastair Cook	50 overs	5	3	2	0	Runners-up	60%
2014 World Twenty20	Stuart Broad	20 overs	4	1	3	0	Super 10	25%
2015 Cricket World Cup	Eoin Morgan	50 overs	6	2	4	0	Group Stage	33.33%
2016 World Twenty20	Eoin Morgan	20 overs	6	4	2	0	Runners-Up	66.66%
2017 ICC Champions Trophy	Eoin Morgan	50 overs	4	3	1	0	Semi Finals	75%
2019 Cricket World Cup	Eoin Morgan	50 overs	11	7	3	1	Champions	63.63%
2021 World Twenty20	Eoin Morgan	20 overs	6	4	2	0	Semi Finals	66.66%
2022 Men's T20 World Cup	Jos Buttler	20 overs	7	5	1	1	Champions	71.43%
2023 Cricket World Cup	Jos Buttler	50 overs	9	3	6	0	Group Stage	33.33%
2024 Men's T20 World Cup	Jos Buttler	20 overs	8	4	3	1	Semi Finals	50%
2025 ICC Champions Trophy	Jos Buttler	50 overs	3	0	3	0	Group Stage	0%
2026 Men's T20 World Cup	Harry Brook	20 overs	8	6	2	0	Semi Finals	75%

=== England v Rest of the World, 1970 ===
In 1970, the proposed South African tour of England was aborted. To replace the tour, a series of five games was played between a "Rest of the World" XI and the England Test team. At the time, these matches were thought of as Test matches. However, later they were stripped of Test status. England's captain in all five games was Ray Illingworth, who won one game, and lost the other four.

English vs Rest of the World Test match captains
Number	Name	Year	Opposition	Location	Played	Won	Lost	Drawn
1	Ray Illingworth	1970	Rest of the World	England	5	1	4	0
Grand total					5	1	4	0

== Women's cricket ==
=== Test match captains ===
This is a list of cricketers who have captained the England women's cricket team for at least one women's Test match. The table of results is complete to the home Test against India in July 2026. Where a player has a dagger (†) next to a Test match series in which she captained at least one Test, that denotes that player was captain for a minor proportion in a series.

English women's Test match captains
Number	Name	Year	Opposition	Location	Played	Won	Lost	Drawn
1	Betty Archdale	1934/5	Australia	Australia	3	2	0	1
1	Betty Archdale	1934/5	New Zealand	New Zealand	1	1	0	0
1	Betty Archdale	Total			4	3	0	1
2	Molly Hide	1937	Australia	England	3	1	1	1
2	Molly Hide	1948/9	Australia	Australia	3	0	1	2
2	Molly Hide	1948/9	New Zealand	New Zealand	1	1	0	0
2	Molly Hide	1951†	Australia	England	1	1	0	0
2	Molly Hide	1954	New Zealand	England	3	1	0	2
2	Molly Hide	Total			11	4	2	5
3	Myrtle Maclagan	1951	Australia	England	2	0	1	1
4	Mary Duggan	1957/8	New Zealand	New Zealand	2	0	0	2
4	Mary Duggan	1957/8	Australia	Australia	2	0	0	2
4	Mary Duggan	1963	Australia	England	3	1	0	2
4	Mary Duggan	Total			7	1	0	6
5	Cecilia Robinson	1957/8†	Australia	Australia	1	0	0	1
6	Helen Sharpe	1960/1	South Africa	South Africa	4	1	0	3
7	Rachael Heyhoe-Flint	1966	New Zealand	England	3	0	0	3
7	Rachael Heyhoe-Flint	1968/9	Australia	Australia	3	0	0	3
7	Rachael Heyhoe-Flint	1968/9	New Zealand	New Zealand	3	2	0	1
7	Rachael Heyhoe-Flint	1976	Australia	England	3	0	0	3
7	Rachael Heyhoe-Flint	Total			12	2	0	10
8	Susan Goatman	1979	West Indies	England	3	2	0	1
9	Jan Southgate	1984	New Zealand	England	3	0	0	3
9	Jan Southgate	1984/5	Australia	Australia	5	1	2	2
9	Jan Southgate	Total			8	1	2	5
10	Carole Hodges	1986	India	England	3	0	0	3
10	Carole Hodges	1987	Australia	England	3	0	1	2
10	Carole Hodges	Total			6	0	1	5
11	Helen Plimmer	1991/2	New Zealand	New Zealand	3	1	0	2
11	Helen Plimmer	1991/2	Australia	Australia	1	0	1	0
11	Helen Plimmer	Total			4	1	1	2
12	Karen Smithies	1995/6	India	India	3	1	0	2
12	Karen Smithies	1996	New Zealand	England	3	0	0	3
12	Karen Smithies	1998	Australia	England	3	0	0	3
12	Karen Smithies	1999	India	England	1	0	0	1
12	Karen Smithies	Total			10	1	0	9
13	Clare Connor	2001	Australia	England	2	0	2	0
13	Clare Connor	2001/2	India	India	1	0	0	1
13	Clare Connor	2002	India	England	1	0	0	1
13	Clare Connor	2002/3	Australia	Australia	2	0	1	1
13	Clare Connor	2003	South Africa	England	2	1	0	1
13	Clare Connor	2004	New Zealand	England	1	0	0	1
13	Clare Connor	2005	Australia	England	2	1	0	1
13	Clare Connor	Total			11	2	3	6
14	Charlotte Edwards	2005/6	India	India	1	0	0	1
14	Charlotte Edwards	2006	India	England	2	0	1	1
14	Charlotte Edwards	2007/8	Australia	Australia	1	1	0	0
14	Charlotte Edwards	2009	Australia	England	1	0	0	1
14	Charlotte Edwards	2010/1	Australia	Australia	1	0	1	0
14	Charlotte Edwards	2013	Australia	England	1	0	0	1
14	Charlotte Edwards	2013/4	Australia	Australia	1	1	0	0
14	Charlotte Edwards	2014	India	England	1	0	1	0
14	Charlotte Edwards	2015	Australia	England	1	0	1	0
14	Charlotte Edwards	Total			10	2	4	4
15	Heather Knight	2017/18	Australia	Australia	1	0	0	1
15	Heather Knight	2019	Australia	England	1	0	0	1
15	Heather Knight	2021	India	England	1	0	0	1
15	Heather Knight	2021/22	Australia.	Australia	1	0	0	1
15	Heather Knight	2022	South Africa	England	1	0	0	1
15	Heather Knight	2023	Australia	England	1	0	1	0
15	Heather Knight	2023/24	India	India	1	0	1	0
15	Heather Knight	2024/25	South Africa	South Africa	1	1	0	0
15	Heather Knight	2024/25	Australia	Australia	1	0	1	0
15	Heather Knight	Total			9	1	3	5
16	Nat Sciver-Brunt	2026	India	England	1	0	1	0
16	Nat Sciver-Brunt	Total			1	0	1	0
Grand total					103	21	18	64

=== Women's One Day International captains ===
This is a list of cricketers who have captained the England women's cricket team for at least one Women's One Day International. The table of results is complete to the ODI series against Ireland in September 2026.

English women's ODI captains
Number	Name	Year	Played	Won	Tied	Lost	No result
1	Rachael Heyhoe Flint	1973–1976	9	7	0	2	0
2	Mary Pilling	1977/8	3	2	0	1	0
3	Susan Goatman	1979–1981/2	15	8	2	5	0
4	Jan Southgate	1984–1984/5	6	3	0	3	0
5	Carole Hodges	1986–1987	5	4	0	1	0
6	Jane Powell	1988/9–1990	16	13	0	3	0
7	Karen Smithies	1990–1999/2000	45	23	0	21	1
8	Helen Plimmer	1991–1991/2	8	5	0	2	1
9	Ella Donnison	1999	3	3	0	0	0
10	Clare Connor	2000–05	66	26	0	39	1
11	Arran Brindle	2001	3	2	0	1	0
12	Charlotte Edwards	2005–2016	117	72	0	38	7
13	Nicky Shaw	2007–10	4	3	0	1	0
14	Heather Knight	2016–2025	94	62	0	29	3
15	Danielle Hazell	2016	1	1	0	0	0
16	Anya Shrubsole	2018	1	0	0	1	0
17	Amy Jones	2022	4	1	0	3	0
18	Nat Sciver-Brunt	2023–2025	15	10	0	5	0
19	Kate Cross	2024	3	2	0	1	0
20	Charlie Dean	2026	6	4	0	1	1
Grand total			424	251	2	157	14

=== Women's Twenty20 International captains ===
This is a list of cricketers who have captained the England women's team for at least one Women's Twenty20 International. The table of results is complete as of 5 July 2026.

English women's Twenty20 International captains
Number	Name	Year	Played	Won	Tied	Lost	No result
1	Clare Connor	2004–2005	2	0	0	2	0
2	Charlotte Edwards	2006–2016	93	68	1	23	1
3	Nicky Shaw	2007	1	0	0	1	0
4	Jenny Gunn	2010–2013	3	2	1	0	0
5	Heather Knight	2016–2025	96	71	1	23	1
6	Danielle Hazell	2018	1	0	0	1	0
7	Nat Sciver-Brunt	2021–2026	20	14	0	6	0
8	Amy Jones	2022	3	2	0	1	0
9	Kate Cross	2024	2	1	0	1	0
10	Tammy Beaumont	2025	3	2	0	1	0
11	Charlie Dean	2026	9	7	0	2	0
Grand total			233	167	3	61	2

== Youth cricket ==
=== Test match captains ===
This is a list of cricketers who have captained the England under-19s for at least one under-19 Test match. The table of results is complete to 20 July 2025. Where a player has a dagger (†) next to a Test match series in which he captained at least one Test, that denotes that player was captain for a minor proportion in a series.

England Under-19 Test match captains
Number	Name	Year	Opposition	Location	Played	Won	Lost	Drawn
1	Nigel Briers	1974	West Indies	England	3	0	1	2
2	Chris Cowdrey	1976	West Indies	England	1	1	0	0
3	Kevin Sharp	1978	West Indies	England	3	1	0	2
4	Nigel Felton	1978/9	Australia	Australia	2	0	0	2
5	Tim Boon	1979/80	West Indies	West Indies	3	0	2	1
5	Tim Boon	1981	India	India	3	0	0	3
5	Tim Boon	Total			6	0	2	4
6	Laurie Potter	1982	West Indies	England	3	0	2	1
7	Hugh Morris	1983	Australia	England	3	1	2	0
8	Neil Lenham	1984/5	West Indies	West Indies	3	0	2	1
9	Mike Roseberry	1986	Sri Lanka	England	3	1	0	2
10	Trevor Ward	1986/7†	Sri Lanka	Sri Lanka	1	0	0	1
11	Mike Atherton	1986/7	Sri Lanka	Sri Lanka	2	0	0	2
12	Mark Ramprakash	1989	New Zealand	England	2	0	1	1
13	Nick Knight	1989†	New Zealand	England	1	0	0	1
14	Wayne Noon	1989/90	Australia	Australia	3	0	1	2
14	Wayne Noon	1990	Pakistan	England	3	1	0	2
14	Wayne Noon	Total			6	1	1	4
15	John Crawley	1990/1	New Zealand	New Zealand	3	0	2	1
15	John Crawley	1991	Australia	England	3	1	1	1
15	John Crawley	Total			6	1	3	2
16	Phil Weston	1991/2	Pakistan	Pakistan	3	1	1	1
16	Phil Weston	1992	Sri Lanka	England	3	1	0	2
16	Phil Weston	Total			6	2	1	3
17	Matthew Walker	1992/3	India	India	3	1	1	1
17	Matthew Walker	1993	West Indies	England	3	1	0	2
17	Matthew Walker	Total			6	2	1	3
18	Michael Vaughan	1993/4	Sri Lanka	Sri Lanka	3	0	1	2
18	Michael Vaughan	1994	India	England	3	0	1	2
18	Michael Vaughan	Total			6	0	2	4
19	Marcus Trescothick	1994/5	West Indies	West Indies	3	0	1	2
19	Marcus Trescothick	1995	South Africa	England	3	2	0	1
19	Marcus Trescothick	Total			6	2	1	3
20	Alex Morris	1995/6	Zimbabwe	Zimbabwe	3	2	0	1
20	Alex Morris	1996†	New Zealand	England	1	0	0	1
20	Alex Morris	Total			4	2	0	2
21	Gareth Batty	1996	New Zealand	England	2	0	1	1
22	Andrew Flintoff	1996/7	Pakistan	Pakistan	3	1	0	2
22	Andrew Flintoff	1997	Zimbabwe	England	2	1	0	1
22	Andrew Flintoff	Total			5	2	0	3
23	Zac Morris	1997†	Zimbabwe	England	1	1	0	0
24	Paul Franks	1997/8	South Africa	South Africa	1	0	0	1
25	Owais Shah	1997/8†	South Africa	South Africa	1	0	0	1
25	Owais Shah	1998	Pakistan	England	3	2	1	0
25	Owais Shah	Total			4	2	1	1
26	Michael Gough	1998/9	New Zealand	New Zealand	3	1	1	1
26	Michael Gough	1999	Australia	England	3	1	1	1
26	Michael Gough	Total			6	2	2	2
27	Ian Bell	2000	Sri Lanka	England	2	1	1	0
27	Ian Bell	2000/1	India	India	3	0	1	2
27	Ian Bell	2001	West Indies	England	1	0	0	1
27	Ian Bell	Total			6	1	2	3
28	Mark Wallace	2000†	Sri Lanka	England	1	0	1	0
29	Nicky Peng	2001†	West Indies	England	1	0	1	0
30	James Tredwell	2001†	West Indies	England	1	0	0	1
31	Paul McMahon	2002	India	England	3	1	0	2
32	Bilal Shafayat	2002/3	Australia	Australia	3	1	2	0
32	Bilal Shafayat	2003	South Africa	England	2	0	1	1
32	Bilal Shafayat	Total			5	1	3	1
33	Joe Sayers	2003†	South Africa	England	1	0	1	0
34	Alastair Cook	2004	Bangladesh	England	3	2	0	1
35	Steven Davies	2004/5	India	India	3	0	3	0
36	Varun Chopra	2005	Sri Lanka	England	3	3	0	0
36	Varun Chopra	2006	India	England	3	0	1	2
36	Varun Chopra	Total			6	3	1	2
37	Ben Wright	2007	Pakistan	England	1	1	0	0
38	Rory Hamilton-Brown	2007	Pakistan	England	1	0	1	0
39	Tom Westley	2008	New Zealand	England	2	1	0	1
40	Hamza Riazuddin	2009	Bangladesh	England	2	1	0	1
41	Azeem Rafiq	2009/10	Bangladesh	Bangladesh	1	0	1	0
41	Azeem Rafiq	2010	Sri Lanka	England	1	0	1	0
41	Azeem Rafiq	Total			2	0	2	0
42	Paul Best	2010†	Sri Lanka	England	1	1	0	0
43	Lewis Gregory	2011	Sri Lanka	Sri Lanka	2	0	0	2
44	Olly Stone	2013	South Africa	South Africa	2	1	1	0
45	Will Rhodes	2014	South Africa	South Africa	2	0	0	2
46	Joe Weatherley	2014/15	Australia	Australia	1	0	0	1
47	Haseeb Hameed	2015	Australia	England	1	0	0	1
48	Max Holden	2016	Sri Lanka	England	2	0	1	1
48	Max Holden	2016/17	India	India	2	0	0	2
48	Max Holden	2017	India	England	2	0	2	0
48	Max Holden	Total			6	0	3	3
49	Tom Banton	2018	South Africa	England	2	2	0	0
50	Tom Lammonby	2018/19	Bangladesh	Bangladesh	2	0	2	0
51	Ben McKinney	2022	Sri Lanka	England	2	0	1	1
51	Ben McKinney	2023	Australia	England	2	0	1	1
51	Ben McKinney	Total			4	0	2	2
52	Jacob Bethell	2022/23	Australia	Australia	2	1	1	0
53	Hamza Shaikh	2024	Sri Lanka	England	2	1	0	1
53	Hamza Shaikh	2025	India	England	1	0	0	1
53	Hamza Shaikh	Total			3	1	0	2
54	Archie Vaughan	2024/25	South Africa	South Africa	2	1	0	1
55	Thomas Rew	2025†	India	England	1	0	0	1
Grand total					161	39	47	75

=== Youth One Day International captains ===
This is a list of cricketers who have captained the England under-19 team for at least one Under-19 One Day International. The table of results is complete to the semi-final of the 2026 Under-19 Men's Cricket World Cup.

English Under-19 ODI captains
Number	Name	Year	Played	Won	Tied	Lost	No result
1	Chris Cowdrey	1976	1	1	0	0	0
2	Kevin Sharp	1977–1978	3	2	0	1	0
3	Nigel Felton	1978/9	1	0	0	1	0
4	Tim Boon	1981	1	1	0	0	0
5	Laurie Potter	1982	2	2	0	0	0
6	Hugh Morris	1983	2	1	0	1	0
7	Neil Lenham	1984/5	3	1	0	2	0
8	Mike Roseberry	1986	2	0	0	2	0
9	Mike Atherton	1986/7–1987/8	11	5	0	6	0
10	Mark Ramprakash	1989	3	3	0	0	0
11	Wayne Noon	1989/90–1990	4	1	0	3	0
12	John Crawley	1990/1–1991	4	0	0	4	0
13	Phil Weston	1991/2	3	0	0	3	0
14	Matthew Walker	1992/3–1993	5	2	0	3	0
15	Michael Vaughan	1993/4–1994	5	3	0	2	0
16	Marcus Trescothick	1994/5–1995	5	4	0	1	0
17	Alex Morris	1995/6	1	1	0	0	0
18	Owais Shah	1996–1998	14	7	0	6	1
19	Andrew Flintoff	1996/7–1997	3	3	0	0	0
20	Michael Gough	1998/9–1999	6	2	0	4	0
21	Alex Loudon	1999/2000	6	3	0	3	0
22	Ian Bell	2000–2001	9	5	0	4	0
23	Nicky Peng	2001/2	6	2	0	4	0
24	Paul McMahon	2002	3	0	0	3	0
25	Bilal Shafayat	2002/3	3	0	0	3	0
26	Samit Patel	2002/3–2003	4	1	0	2	1
27	Alastair Cook	2003/4–2004	8	6	0	2	0
28	Steven Davies	2004/5	5	1	0	4	0
29	Varun Chopra	2005–2006	12	2	0	9	1
30	Moeen Ali	2005/6	5	3	0	2	0
31	Greg Wood	2006/7	11	5	0	6	0
32	Rory Hamilton-Brown	2007	5	1	0	3	1
33	Alex Wakely	2007/8	8	3	0	5	0
34	Tom Westley	2007/8–2008	7	2	1	1	3
35	Liam Dawson	2008/9	5	2	0	3	0
36	Azeem Rafiq	2009–2009/10	14	4	0	9	1
37	Paul Best	2009/10–2010	8	4	0	3	1
38	Lewis Gregory	2010/11	3	0	0	2	1
39	Adam Ball	2011/12	27	13	0	13	1
40	Ben Duckett	2013	11	2	0	9	0
41	Jonny Tattersall	2013	1	0	1	0	0
42	Lewis McManus	2013	1	0	1	0	0
43	Will Rhodes	2013/14	14	9	0	5	0
44	Joe Weatherley	2014/15	4	1	0	3	0
45	Aneurin Donald	2014/15–2015	5	3	0	2	0
46	Brad Taylor	2015/16	10	4	0	5	1
47	Max Holden	2016–2016/17	5	0	1	4	0
48	Matthew Fisher	2016/17	3	1	0	2	0
49	Will Jacks	2017–2017/18	3	2	0	1	0
50	Harry Brook	2017–2017/18	11	4	0	7	0
51	Tom Banton	2018	2	0	0	2	0
52	Jamie Smith	2018/19	3	0	0	3	0
53	George Balderson	2019–2019/20	14	5	1	8	0
54	George Hill	2019–2019/20	7	5	0	2	0
55	Jacob Bethell	2021–2022	5	4	0	1	0
56	Tom Prest	2021–2021/22	12	8	0	4	0
57	James Rew	2021	1	0	0	1	0
58	Ben McKinney	2022–2023/24	18	10	0	7	1
59	Jack Carney	2023	1	0	0	1	0
60	Luc Benkenstein	2023–2024	4	2	0	2	0
61	Thomas Rew	2024–2025/26	17	11	0	4	2
62	Archie Vaughan	2025	3	1	0	2	0
63	Ben Dawkins	2025	1	1	0	0	0
64	Farhan Ahmed	2025/26	7	4	0	3	0
Grand total			391	171	3	202	15
