= Zack Morris =

Zack Morris may refer to:

- Zack Morris (Saved by the Bell), fictional character from the sitcoms Good Morning, Miss Bliss; Saved by the Bell; and Saved by the Bell: The College Years
- Zack Morris (actor) (born 1998), English actor

== See also ==
- Zac Morris, English cricketer
