= Phil Edmonds =

English cricketer (born 1951)

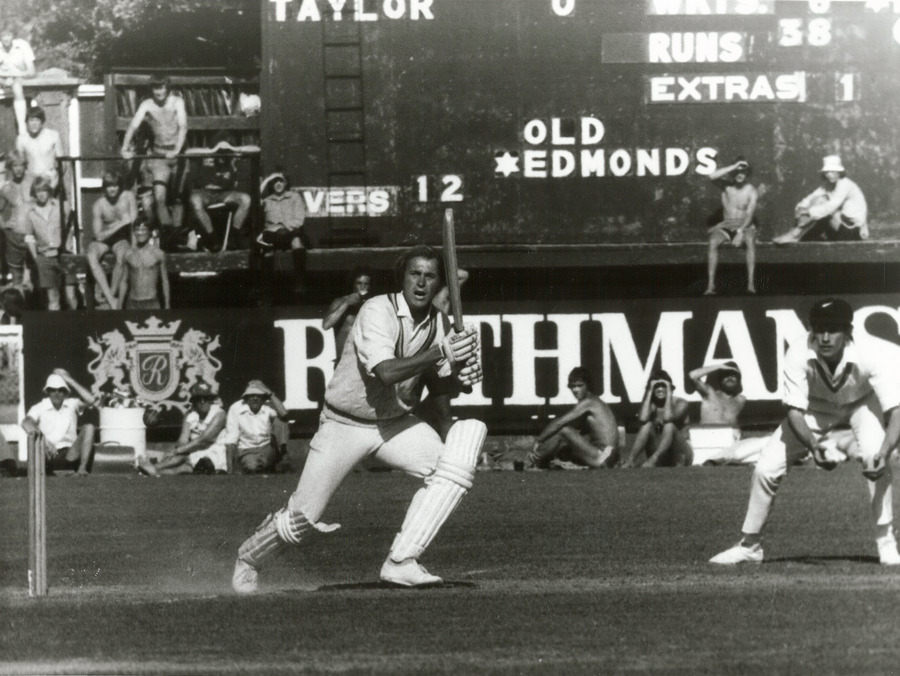
- Edmonds batting against New Zealand, February 1978

Personal information
- Full name: Philippe-Henri Edmonds
- Born: 8 March 1951 (age 75); Lusaka, Northern Rhodesia
- Nickname: Goat, Henry
- Height: 6 ft 2 in (1.88 m)
- Batting: Right-handed
- Bowling: Slow left arm orthodox
- Role: Bowler

International information
- National side: England
- Test debut (cap 464): 14 August 1975 v Australia
- Last Test: 11 August 1987 v Pakistan
- ODI debut (cap 42): 23 December 1977 v Pakistan
- Last ODI: 2 April 1987 v India

Domestic team information
- Years: Team
- 1971–1973: Cambridge University
- 1971–1992: Middlesex
- 1975/76: Eastern Province

Career statistics
| Competition | Test | ODI | FC | LA |
|---|---|---|---|---|
| Matches | 51 | 29 | 391 | 301 |
| Runs scored | 875 | 116 | 7,651 | 2,467 |
| Batting average | 17.50 | 10.54 | 18.93 | 15.91 |
| 100s/50s | 0/2 | 0/0 | 3/22 | 0/2 |
| Top score | 64 | 20 | 142 | 63* |
| Balls bowled | 12,028 | 1,534 | 85,961 | 13,467 |
| Wickets | 125 | 26 | 1246 | 323 |
| Bowling average | 34.18 | 37.11 | 25.66 | 25.11 |
| 5 wickets in innings | 2 | 0 | 47 | 2 |
| 10 wickets in match | 0 | 0 | 9 | 0 |
| Best bowling | 7/66 | 3/39 | 8/53 | 5/12 |
| Catches/stumpings | 42/– | 6/– | 345/– | 89/– |
Medal record
Men's Cricket
Representing England
ICC Cricket World Cup
| Runner-up | 1979 England |
- Source: Cricinfo, 4 December 2007

Philippe-Henri Edmonds (born 8 March 1951) is a former cricketer who represented England at international level and Middlesex at county level. After his retirement he became a successful, albeit controversial, corporate executive. He was a part of the England squad who finished as runners-up at the 1979 Cricket World Cup.

Edmonds played most of his cricket as a lower-order right-handed batsman, and bowled slow left-arm orthodox spin. Possessing a textbook action and a pace bowler's temperament – he was known to bowl the odd bouncer when riled – he was also able to use his height (standing over six feet tall) to flight the ball above the batsman's eye line. Edmonds was renowned as one of the most entertaining and colourful characters in the game, whose mood could range from abrasive to charming, and remained a strong-minded and free-spirited individual throughout his career.

== Early life and early career ==
Edmonds was born in Lusaka. His father was a British businessman and his mother was from Belgium. Whilst living in Lusaka he was educated at Gilbert Rennie High School, which in his biography he later said had magnificent academic and sporting facilities. He moved to England in 1966 and completed his secondary education at the Skinners' School and then Cranbrook School in Kent before enrolling at Fitzwilliam College, Cambridge, as a student of land economy.

Edmonds made his first-class debut for Cambridge University against Warwickshire on 24 April 1971. He opened the batting, making 10 and 3, and bowled without success as Warwickshire won by 109 runs. However, in the following match, against Leicestershire, he recorded his first 5-wicket haul in an innings, taking 5/50, and backed this up with 4/48 in the second innings to help Cambridge University to a seven-wicket win. After taking 7/56 in the first innings of the annual University Match against Oxford University, finishing the match with his first 10-wicket haul in a first-class match, Edmonds made his debut for Middlesex in a thrilling match against Essex at Lord's Cricket Ground on 4 August. He bowled solidly, returning figures of 2/51 and 3/42, and was the last batsman in with Middlesex still needing 16 runs off the final two overs to win. In the end, Middlesex ran out of time and had to defend the final ball to escape with a draw, which they managed.

Edmonds made his debut for England in the third Test of the 1975 Ashes series at Headingley. Defending a first innings of 288, England managed to dismiss Australia for 135, with Edmonds taking a stunning 5/28. His first Test wicket was Greg Chappell, caught by Derek Underwood, and then he trapped Ross Edwards in front next ball to be on a hat-trick. However, the match had to be abandoned after vandals ruined the pitch, and the result was declared a draw.

== County and international career ==
At county level, Edmonds's Middlesex career coincided with that of John Emburey. The left- and right-arm spin combination was a powerful contribution towards Middlesex's success in the 1980s. They also combined at England level, although the pair often competed for the same place in the Test team.

After playing for Eastern Province in the Currie Cup competition during the 1975–76 season, Edmonds returned to England and straight into the English county season. Although he was more renowned for his exploits with the ball, he could also deliver on occasion with the bat when needed. One such instance was the county match against Northamptonshire early in Middlesex's championship-winning 1976 season. In the second innings of that match, Middlesex appeared on the verge of losing by an innings when Edmonds came to the crease. He proceeded to bat aggressively but also sensibly, supported by Mike Gatting and Fred Titmus. By the time Edmonds was dismissed on 93 – at that time his highest first-class score – made in 90 minutes with 12 fours and four sixes, Middlesex had built a 136-run lead. He then took two catches to help hinder Northamptonshire's run chase, turning what earlier looked like a sizeable defeat into a draw. Edmonds went further with the bat later that season in a match for T N Pearce's XI against the touring West Indies cricket team, recording his first first-class century, 103 not out. Edmonds also starred with the ball in this game in a rare defeat for the West Indies on this tour (although admittedly they had rested fast bowlers Andy Roberts and Michael Holding for the game), taking 9 for 98 in the match.

From his 1975 debut Test until his last one, against Pakistan in 1987, Edmonds only played 51 out of a possible 126 Tests for England. While this could in part be attributed to playing form and the aforementioned competition for the spinner spot with his Middlesex teammate John Emburey, his confrontational and outspoken nature meant that additionally, he did not always convey a good impression to the national selectors. During England's 1984–85 tour of India, England were playing India in Calcutta, and the hosts played at a snail's pace towards an inevitable draw. Edmonds, fielding at square leg, produced a copy of The Daily Telegraph and proceeded to read. He contributed more significantly in this Test series by taking 14 wickets as England surprisingly beat India; he likewise took 15 wickets in each of two series against Australia as England regained the Ashes in 1985 and retained them in 1986–87.

In spite of his success in his debut Test, Edmonds only played one more Test over the next two years. After fellow left-arm slow bowler Derek Underwood joined World Series Cricket in 1977, however, Edmonds was recalled for the 1977–78 tour of Pakistan, where he took his best Test figures in his fourth Test, 7/66, which remain the best Test match innings figures by an England bowler in Pakistan. Later that winter in his sixth Test he made his first Test half-century, but in the remainder of his Test career added only one more fifty (his highest Test score, 64), and no further five-wicket hauls.

Edmonds also played in 29 one-day internationals for England, including England's first appearance in a world cup final in 1979, where he returned the best bowling figures of any England bowler, although on the losing side against the West Indies.

After an on-field absence of five years, Edmonds played his final first-class match in June 1992, in a draw against Nottinghamshire at Trent Bridge. He had been serving as a member of Middlesex' selection committee and volunteered to replace Phil Tufnell, who was recovering from an appendix operation. He showed that he had lost none of his skill, combining with his former partner-in-crime John Emburey and taking 4/48 in Nottinghamshire's first innings.

== Business career ==
Since retiring from cricket, Edmonds has enjoyed a successful career in business, serving as chairman of Middlesex Holdings, White Nile Petroleum Company and Middlesex County Cricket Club. As of July 2012, he had an estimated fortune of 14 million pounds.

Edmonds was also the chairman of Central African Mining & Exploration Company (CAMEC) Plc, a company which was bought by Eurasian Natural Resources Corporation in September 2009.

== Personal life ==
He was married to the author Frances Edmonds between 1976 and 2007. They have a daughter, Alexandra.

== See also ==
- List of Test cricketers born in non-Test playing nations

== Bibliography ==
- Barnes, Simon (1986). Phil Edmonds: A Singular Man. London: Kingswood Press. ISBN 0-434-98092-7..
- Bateman, Colin (1993). If The Cap Fits. Tony Williams Publications. pp. 56–57. ISBN 1-869833-21-X.
