= James Lillywhite's Cricketers' Annual =

Defunct cricket annual

- An edition of "Red Lilly"
- Editor: Charles W. Alcock
- Categories: Cricket
- Frequency: Annual
- Format: Print
- Publisher: James Lillywhite, Frowd & Co.
- Founder: James Lillywhite
- Founded: 1872
- First issue: 1872
- Final issue: 1900
- Company: James Lillywhite, Frowd & Co.
- Country: United Kingdom
- Language: English

James Lillywhite's Cricketers' Annual was a cricket annual edited by Charles W. Alcock, the secretary of Surrey County Cricket Club, between 1872 and 1900. It is generally referred to as "Red Lilly" because of the colour of its cover. It was published by James Lillywhite, Frowd & Co., and sold for 1s.

From the 1876 edition it included a frontispiece, which was an actual photograph affixed into the annual. The 1883 edition includes a tribute to James Lillywhite Sr, who was "the brain which devised the conception of the Annual", and who had died in 1882.

James Lillywhite's Cricketers' Annual incorporated John Lillywhite's Cricketer's Companion from 1886 on, after the latter ceased separate publication in 1885.

== See also ==
- Football Annual (a similar publication for football, also edited by Alcock)
