= International cricket in 1890 =

International cricket season

The 1890 international cricket season was from April 1890 to September 1890. The season consisted of a single international tour, visiting with Australia England for The Ashes series famously known as The greats: Grace v Murdoch 1890.

== Season overview ==
International tours
Start date	Home team	Away team	Results [Matches]			
Start date	Home team	Away team	Test	ODI	FC	LA
21 July 1890	England	Australia	2–0 [2]	—	—	—

== July ==
=== Australia in England ===
The Ashes Test match series
No.	Date	Home captain	Away captain	Venue	Result
Test 33	21–23 July	W. G. Grace	Billy Murdoch	Lord's, London	England by 7 wickets
Test 34	11–12 August	W. G. Grace	Billy Murdoch	Kennington Oval, London	England by 2 wickets
Test 000034a	25–27 August	W. G. Grace	Billy Murdoch	Old Trafford Cricket Ground, Manchester	Match abandoned

== See also ==
- History of Test cricket from 1890 to 1900
