= English cricket team in Pakistan in 1977–78 =

International cricket tour

The England national cricket team toured Pakistan from November 1977 to January 1978 and played a three-match Test series against the Pakistan national cricket team. The Test series was drawn 0–0. England were captained by Mike Brearley and Pakistan by Wasim Bari. Geoffrey Boycott captained England in the third test after Brearley returned home with a broken arm. In addition, the teams played a three-match Limited Overs International (LOI) series which England won 2–1.

== Test series summary ==
=== First Test ===
14–19 December 1977
(5-day match)
Scorecard

Pakistan	v	England
407 (133 overs); Haroon Rasheed 122 (244); G Miller 3/102 (37 overs); GA Cope 3/102 (39 overs)		288 (135.7 overs); G Miller 98* (322); Sarfraz Nawaz 4/68 (34 overs)
106/3 (28 overs); Haroon Rasheed 45* (72); RGD Willis 2/34 (7 overs)

Match drawn
Gaddafi Stadium, Lahore
Umpires: Amanullah Khan and Aslam Khokhar

- Pakistan won the toss and elected to bat.
- 17 December was taken as a rest day.
- GA Cope and BC Rose (both ENG), and Abdul Qadir (PAK) made their Test debuts.

=== Second Test ===
2–7 January 1978
(5-day match)
Scorecard

Pakistan	v	England
275 (79.6 overs); Haroon Rasheed 108 (176); PH Edmonds 3/75 (24 overs)		191 (86.6 overs); G Boycott 79 (198); Abdul Qadir 6/44 (24 overs)
259/4d (88 overs); Mudassar Nazar 66 (232); RGD Willis 2/26 (11 overs)		186/1 (81.4 overs); G Boycott 100* (303); Wasim Raja 1/14 (12 overs)

Match drawn
Niaz Stadium, Hyderabad
Umpires: Mahboob Shah and Shujauddin
Player of the match: G Boycott (ENG)

- Pakistan won the toss and elected to bat.
- 5 January was taken as a rest day.

=== Third Test ===
18–23 January 1978
(5-day match)
Scorecard

England	v	Pakistan
266 (123.1 overs); GRJ Roope 56 (241); Abdul Qadir 4/81 (40.1 overs)		281 (95 overs); Mudassar Nazar 76 (209); PH Edmonds 7/66 (33 overs)
222/5 (89 overs); G Boycott 56 (201); Sikander Bakht 2/40 (17 overs)

Match drawn
National Stadium, Karachi
Umpires: Amanullah Khan and Shakoor Rana
Player of the match: PH Edmonds (ENG)

- England won the toss and elected to bat.
- 21 January was taken as a rest day.
- MW Gatting (ENG) and Mohsin Khan (PAK) made their Test debuts.

== One Day Internationals (ODIs) ==
=== 1st ODI ===
23 December 1977
Scorecard

Pakistan; 208/6 (35 overs)	v	England; 212/7 (35 overs)
Javed Miandad 77* (109); IT Botham 3/39 (7 overs)		BC Rose 54 (104); Wasim Raja 1/11 (2 overs)

England won by 3 wickets
Zafar Ali Stadium, Sahiwal
Umpires: Azhar Hasan and Shakoor Rana

- Pakistan won the toss and elected to bat.
- PR Downton, PH Edmonds, MW Gatting and BC Rose (all ENG), and Aamer Hameed, Hasan Jamil, Liaqat Ali, Mudassar Nazar and Shafiq Ahmed (all PAK) made their ODI debuts.

=== 2nd ODI ===
30 December 1977
Scorecard

Pakistan; 151 (33.7 overs)	v	England; 152/4 (32.7 overs)
Wasim Raja 43 (54); JK Lever 3/18 (6 overs)		DW Randall 51* (81); Iqbal Qasim 2/16 (7 overs)

England won by 6 wickets
Jinnah Stadium, Sialkot
Umpires: Javed Akhtar and Khalid Aziz

- England won the toss and elected to field.
- GA Cope (ENG), and Haroon Rasheed, Iqbal Qasim and Sikander Bakht (all PAK) made their ODI debuts.

=== 3rd ODI ===
13 January 1978
Scorecard

Pakistan; 158/6 (35 overs)	v	England; 122 (31.6 overs)
Mohsin Khan 51* (75); JK Lever 2/25 (7 overs)		GRJ Roope 37 (73); Wasim Raja 3/23 (4.6 overs)

Pakistan won by 36 runs
Gaddafi Stadium, Lahore
Umpires: Khalid Aziz and Shakoor Rana
Player of the match: Wasim Raja (PAK)

- England won the toss and elected to field.
- Arshad Pervez (PAK) made his ODI debut.
