= 1982 English cricket season =

The 1982 English cricket season was the 83rd in which the County Championship had been an official competition. India and Pakistan toured but both were defeated by England in their Test series. Middlesex won the County Championship.

== Honours ==
- County Championship - Middlesex
- NatWest Trophy - Surrey
- Sunday League - Sussex
- Benson & Hedges Cup - Somerset
- Minor Counties Championship - Oxfordshire
- Second XI Championship - Worcestershire II
- Wisden - Imran Khan, Trevor Jesty, Alvin Kallicharran, Kapil Dev, Malcolm Marshall

== Test series ==
=== Pakistan tour ===
In May–July the Indian cricket team in England in 1982 played 3 Tests and 2 ODIs. Pakistan played a similar itinerary from June to September.

== Zimbabwe tour ==
The Zimbabwe team made its inaugural tour of England in 1982 and played two first-class matches, both of which were drawn.

== Annual reviews ==
- Playfair Cricket Annual 1983
- Wisden Cricketers' Almanack 1983
