= James Lillywhite =

English cricketer and umpire (1843–1929)

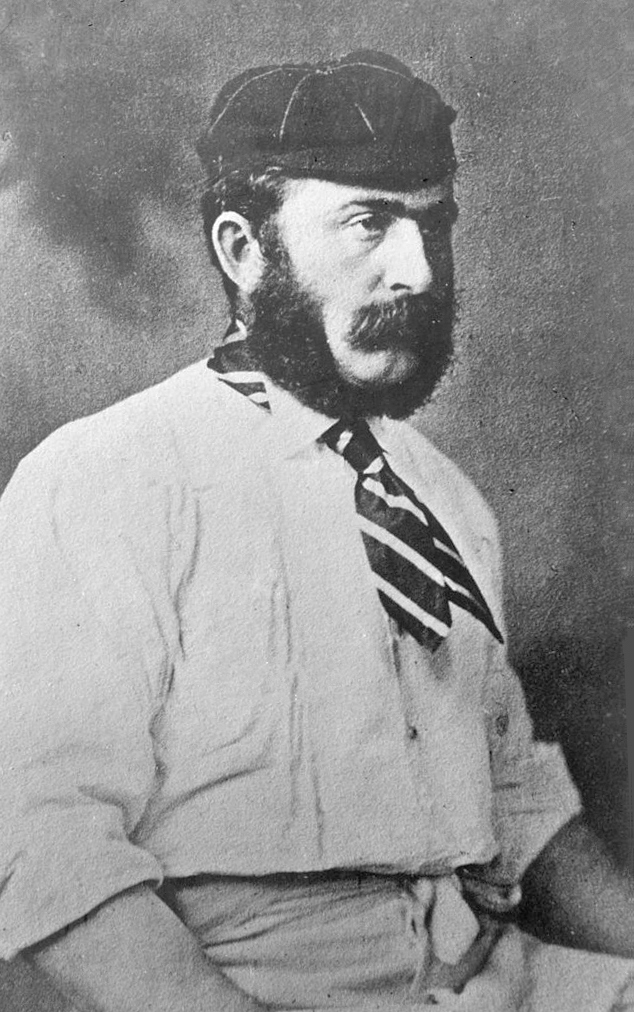

Personal information
- Full name: James Lillywhite, junior
- Born: 23 February 1842; Westhampnett, Sussex, England
- Died: 25 October 1929 (aged 87); Chichester, Sussex, England
- Batting: Left-handed
- Bowling: Left arm slow-medium

International information
- National side: England
- Test debut (cap 7): 15 March 1877 v Australia
- Last Test: 4 April 1877 v Australia

Domestic team information
- Years: Team
- 1862–1883: Sussex

Umpiring information
- Tests umpired: 6 (1881–1899)

Career statistics
| Competition | Tests | First-class |
|---|---|---|
| Matches | 2 | 256 |
| Runs scored | 16 | 5523 |
| Batting average | 8.00 | 14.30 |
| 100s/50s | 0/0 | 2/12 |
| Top score | 10 | 126 * |
| Balls bowled | 340 | 57,257 |
| Wickets | 8 | 1,210 |
| Bowling average | 15.75 | 15.23 |
| 5 wickets in innings | 0 | 96 |
| 10 wickets in match | 0 | 22 |
| Best bowling | 4/70 | 10/129 |
| Catches/stumpings | 1/– | 109/– |
- Source: CricketArchive, 21 September 2008

James Lillywhite (23 February 1842 – 25 October 1929) was an English Test cricketer and umpire. He was the first ever captain of the English cricket team in a Test match, captaining two Tests against Australia in 1876–77, losing the first, but winning the second.

Lillywhite was born in Westhampnett in Sussex, the son of a brickmaker, John Lillywhite. In the 1861 census the 19 year old James' profession is given as Tile Maker. He was the nephew of William Lillywhite, and so cousin to William's sons, James Lillywhite senior, John, Fred and Harry. Lillywhite is termed "junior" in sources to differentiate between him and his cousin James senior. He became a professional cricketer, and played first-class cricket for Sussex from 1862 and 1883. He played one final first-class match in 1885. Before the pre-Ashes Test-playing tour to Australia in 1876–77, Lillywhite also joined tours to North America in 1868 in a team led by Edgar Willsher, to Australia in 1873–74 in a team led by W.G. Grace. He also joined three further tours to Australia in teams led by Alfred Shaw, in 1881–82, 1884–85 and 1886–87.

== Test cricket ==
James Lillywhite and Dave Gregory were the first Test Captains. Neither were great with the bat. Of the two, James top scored in the 1st Test, scoring 10 in the 1st Innings on 17-Mar and scored 4 in the 2nd Innings on 19 March. James, having lost the toss, had his side put into bat which meant that James was the first Test player as he led out his England side. He was 35 years 20 days old. As his team followed him out, he was passed by England No: 1 Harry Jupp and England No: 8 Tom Emmett who were both 35 years old but older than James Lillywhite.

He stood as a first-class umpire between 1883 and 1901, including six Test matches. He umpired all four Test matches between Australia and England in the 1881–82 season (being partnered by John Swift in three matches and George Coulthard in the other). He was one of the organisers of Arthur Shrewsbury's team to Australia in 1884–85 but, in spite of his experience, the Australian captain Billy Murdoch refused to allow him to umpire the first ever Test match at Adelaide. However, along with Ted Elliott, he umpired in the second Test of that series, when the entire Australian team refused to play unless they received fifty per cent of gate takings. Nine new faces appeared for Australia, and were soundly beaten. Lillywhite's other match as umpire was the drawn fourth Test between England and Australia at Old Trafford in 1899.

He died in Chichester, the last English survivor of the first Test match.

== See also ==
- History of Test cricket (to 1883)
- History of Test cricket (1884 to 1889)
- History of Test cricket (1890 to 1900)
- Australian Test Cricket Umpires
- List of Test umpires

Sporting positions
| Preceded by None | English national cricket captain 1876/7 | Succeeded by Lord Harris |
| Preceded by E M Grace | Oldest Living Test Cricketer; 20 May 1911 – 25 October 1929 | Succeeded by Francis MacKinnon |
