= James Lillywhite (cricketer, born 1825) =

English cricketer

James Lillywhite Senior (29 October 1825 – 24 November 1882) was an English cricketer active from 1850 to 1860 who played for Sussex and Middlesex. He was born in Hove and died in Cheltenham. He appeared in twenty first-class matches as a righthanded batsman who bowled right arm medium pace with a roundarm action. He scored 169 runs with a highest score of 33 and took 31 wickets with a best performance of three for 11. He is referred to as "Senior" in sources to distinguish him from his more famous cousin, James Lillywhite Junior. He was a member of the Lillywhite family which was famous in 19th-century cricket and devised the annual season review named after him: James Lillywhite's Cricketers' Annual.
