= Monty Bowden =

English cricketer

- Bowden in 1885

Personal information
- Full name: Montague Parker Bowden
- Born: 1 November 1865; Stockwell, Surrey, England
- Died: 19 February 1892 (aged 26); Umtali, Rhodesia
- Batting: Right-handed
- Role: Wicket-keeper

International information
- National side: England
- Test debut (cap 61): 12 March 1889 v South Africa
- Last Test: 26 March 1889 v South Africa

Domestic team information
- Years: Team
- 1883–1888: Surrey
- 1889/90: Transvaal

Career statistics
Competition	Test	First-class
Matches	2	86
Runs scored	25	2,316
Batting average	12.50	20.13
100s/50s	0/0	3/7
Top score	25	189 not out
Balls bowled	0	75
Wickets	–	2
Bowling average	–	17.50
5 wickets in innings	–	0
10 wickets in match	–	0
Best bowling	–	2/7
Catches/stumpings	1/0	73/14
- Source: CricketArchive, 23 September 2008

Montague Parker Bowden (1 November 1865 – 19 February 1892) was an English first-class cricketer, a wicket-keeper, who played two Test matches against South Africa in 1888/89.

Bowden was born in Stockwell, Surrey, and educated at Dulwich College. Aged 23 years 144 days, he became England's youngest captain on 25 March 1889, when he captained England to victory in the second of his two Tests. Bowden had been deputy to C. Aubrey Smith, but Smith missed the second test through illness.

Bowden stayed in South Africa to participate in the Witwatersrand Gold Rush, went to Rhodesia with the Pioneer Column, and ended up smuggling liquor. In 1892, he died in Umtali Hospital, Umtali, Rhodesia (now Mutare, Zimbabwe). Officially he died of epilepsy, although a fall from his cart, leading him to be trampled under the hooves of his own oxen contributed to his death. Umtali Hospital was nothing more than a glorified mud hut, where his body had to be protected from marauding lions, prior to being interred in a coffin made from whiskey cases.

== External reference ==
- Monty Bowden at Cricinfo
- Daily Telegraph (UK newspaper)
