= Alex Morris =

English cricketer (born 1976)

Personal information
- Full name: Alexander Corfield Morris
- Born: 4 October 1976 (age 50); Barnsley, Yorkshire, England
- Batting: Left-handed
- Bowling: Right-arm medium
- Relatives: Zac Morris (brother)

Domestic team information
- Years: Team
- 1995–1997: Yorkshire
- 1998–2003: Hampshire

Career statistics
Competition	First-class	List A
Matches	62	42
Runs scored	1,392	285
Batting average	20.17	17.81
100s/50s	–/7	–/–
Top score	65	48*
Balls bowled	7,867	1,169
Wickets	156	39
Bowling average	26.40	26.23
5 wickets in innings	5	1
10 wickets in match	1	–
Best bowling	5/39	5/32
Catches/stumpings	34/–	8/–
- Source: Cricinfo, 17 June 2022

Alex Morris (born Alexander Corfield Morris, 4 October 1976 in Barnsley, West Yorkshire, England) is an English former first-class cricketer. He was a left-handed batsman and a right-arm medium pace bowler, who, during his eight years in first-class cricket played for Yorkshire County Cricket Club and Hampshire.

Between 1994 and 1996, Morris played in thirteen Youth Test matches for England Under-19s, for whom he scored a half-century in his debut innings. Following his final Youth Test Match against New Zealand in 1996, he started playing County Championship cricket on a regular basis for Yorkshire, having made his debut the previous year. He left Yorkshire in 1997 and joined Hampshire. More recently Morris played for Nottinghamshire's Second XI.

Morris' brother, Zachary also played first-class cricket for Hampshire.

In 2010, Morris became the captain of the Hoylandswaine Cricket Club, who play in the Huddersfield Drakes Cricket League.
