= Pakistani cricket team in England in 1982 =

International cricket tour

The Pakistan cricket team toured England in the 1982 season and played a three-match Test series against England between 29 July and 31 August 1982. England won the series 2–1. After this, England did not win another Test series against Pakistan for 18 years.

== Test series summary ==
=== First Test ===
29 July–1 August 1982
Scorecard

England	v	Pakistan
272 (92.3 overs); DI Gower 74 (144); Imran Khan 7/52 (25.3 overs)		251 (79.2 overs); Mansoor Akhtar 58 (151); IA Greig 4/53 (14.2 overs)
291 (105.3 overs); DW Randall 105 (156); Tahir Naqqash 5/40 (18 overs)		199 (56.4 overs); Imran Khan 65 (103); IT Botham 4/70 (21 overs)

England won by 113 runs
Edgbaston, Birmingham
Umpires: DGL Evans and KE Palmer
Player of the match: Imran Khan (PAK)

- England won the toss and elected to bat.
- The match was scheduled for five days but completed in four.
- IA Greig and EE Hemmings (both ENG) made their Test debuts.

=== Second Test ===
12–16 August 1982
Scorecard

Pakistan	v	England
428/8d (139 overs); Mohsin Khan 200 (386); RD Jackman 4/110 (36 overs)		227 (86 overs); Extras 46; AJ Lamb 33 (78); Abdul Qadir 4/39 (24 overs)
77/0 (13.1 overs); Mohsin Khan 39* (43)		276 (f/o) (119.5 overs); CJ Tavaré 82 (277); Mudassar Nazar 6/32 (19 overs)

Pakistan won by 10 wickets
Lord's, London
Umpires: HD Bird and DJ Constant
Player of the match: Mohsin Khan (PAK)

- Pakistan won the toss and elected to bat.

=== Third Test ===
26–31 August 1982
Scorecard

Pakistan	v	England
275 (100.5 overs); Imran Khan 67* (131); IT Botham 4/70 (24.5 overs)		256 (89.2 overs); DI Gower 74 (169); Imran Khan 5/49 (25.2 overs)
199 (81 overs); Javed Miandad 52 (57); IT Botham 5/74 (30 overs)		219/7 (80.2 overs); G Fowler 86 (203); Mudassar Nazar 4/55 (22 overs)

England won by 3 wickets
Headingley, Leeds
Umpires: DJ Constant and BJ Meyer
Player of the match: Imran Khan (PAK)

- Pakistan won the toss and elected to bat.
- 29 August was taken as a rest day.
- G Fowler and VJ Marks (both ENG) made their Test debuts.

== One Day Internationals (ODIs) ==
England won the Prudential Trophy 2–0.

=== 1st ODI ===
17 July 1982
Scorecard

Pakistan; 250/6 (55 overs)	v	England; 252/3 (47.1 overs)
Zaheer Abbas 53 (72); IT Botham 3/57 (11 overs)		AJ Lamb 118 (121); Imran Khan 2/35 (11 overs)

England won by 7 wickets
Trent Bridge, Nottingham
Umpires: DGL Evans and AGT Whitehead
Player of the match: AJ Lamb (ENG)

- Pakistan won the toss and elected to bat.
- EE Hemmings and DR Pringle (both ENG) made their ODI debuts.

=== 2nd ODI ===
19 July 1982

England; 295/8 (55 overs)	v	Pakistan; 222 (49.4 overs)
MW Gatting 76 (81); Imran Khan 2/48 (11 overs)		Wasim Raja 60 (61); DR Pringle 2/43 (11 overs)

England won by 73 runs
Old Trafford, Manchester
Umpires: HD Bird and DJ Constant
Player of the match: MW Gatting (ENG)

- Pakistan won the toss and elected to field.

== Annual reviews ==
- Playfair Cricket Annual 1983
- Wisden Cricketers' Almanack 1983
