= History of Test cricket from 1890 to 1900 =

Test matches (matches of Test cricket) in the 19th century were somewhat different affairs than what they are today. Many of them were not designated as Test matches for many years afterwards, and it is possible that some Test players never knew they had played in a Test. Before 1888 there had been 26 Test matches, all between England and Australia. England had won 13 of them, Australia 9, with 4 draws. During the 19th century England played in all the Tests, which were mostly against Australia, though a few were against what tended to be a very weak South African XI.

By the end of the 19th century, 64 Test matches had been played. Whilst the great England v. Australia matches towards the end of the century were recognised as Tests at the time, the classification of many of the games listed below as Tests only happened much later. Some of the games, especially those involving South Africa, were between a very weak South African squad and a not particularly representative England team. By 1900 South Africa had played 8 games, and lost them all to England. Meanwhile, England had faced Australia 56 times, winning 26, losing 20, and drawing 10. Additionally, one game was abandoned without a ball being bowled because of rain.

== The greats: Grace v Murdoch 1890 ==
This series marked the return of Billy Murdoch as Australia's leader, and pitched him against The Champion, WG Grace. The Australian side was good, but they were still without some of their best players. 1890 was a wet summer, and the rain affected all of the three planned Tests. The first Test was the most eagerly anticipated match of the English summer, with 30,279 spectators watching it over the 3 days, though Stoddart and Briggs did not play. Rain on the 2 days before the match left the pitch slow, but it got steadily better and better, and was at its best on the last day, when England scored 137 to win by 7 wickets, with Grace, who was out for a duck in the first innings, scoring 75 not out. The second Test at the Oval was particularly tense, partly, no doubt, because Andrew Stoddart (an amateur) chose to play for Middlesex, whilst Peel and Ulyett (professionals) were claimed by Yorkshire. Rain before the first day's play contributed to 22 wickets falling for 197 runs on day 1. On day 2, England only needed 95 to win, they lost eight wickets to Charles Turner and Ferris before getting them, with the winning run being scampered as Australia missed a clear run out chance. A planned third Test match at Old Trafford, Manchester was washed out, thereby becoming the first Test to be abandoned entirely because of the weather.

Australia in England 1890. Match length: 3 days. Balls per over: 5. Series result: England win 2–0.

No.	Date	Home captain	Away captain	Venue	Result
33	21, 22, 23 Jul 1890	WG Grace	Billy Murdoch	Lord's	ENG by 7 wkts
34	11, 12 Aug 1890	WG Grace	Billy Murdoch	The Oval	ENG by 2 wkts
–	(25, 26, 27 Aug 1890)	WG Grace	Billy Murdoch	Old Trafford	ABANDONED

== Australian summer 1891–92 ==
Lord Sheffield led the England team, which was captained by WG Grace, on the tour to play an Australian side captained by the great Jack Blackham. The England side was reckoned to be a strong one, even though only six of the tourists had played Test cricket before. Australia won the first Test by 54 runs. In the second, after conceding a first innings deficit of 162 runs, scored 391 to leave England needing 230 to win. Despite poor light, Grace stuck to the usual batting order, and England were soon 11 for 3. Grace got heavily criticised as England lost by 72 runs. In the third Test, on a good batting pitch, England scored 490 for 9. Torrential rain then ruined the pitch for further play and Australia collapsed twice to record a massive defeat by an innings and 230 runs.

England in Australia 1891–92. Match length: Timeless. Balls per over: 6. Series result: Australia won 2–1.

No.	Date	Home captain	Away captain	Venue	Result
35	1, 2, 4, 5, 6 Jan 1892	Jack Blackham	WG Grace	Melbourne Cricket Ground	AUS by 54 runs
36	29, 30 Jan, 1, 2, 3 Feb 1892	Jack Blackham	WG Grace	Sydney Cricket Ground	AUS by 72 runs
38	24, 25, 26, 28 Mar 1892	Jack Blackham	WG Grace	Adelaide Oval	ENG by Inns&230 runs

== Second England tour to South Africa 1891–92 ==
This match was not considered by anyone at the time to be a Test, but was subsequently elevated to Test match status. The main England winter tour was still ongoing in Australia. As a result, Walter Read's two Test match victories as captain leave him as one of the two with a 100% record while captaining England in more than one Test. The main points of note are that this game Billy Murdoch and JJ Ferris, both of whom had previously played for Australia and had now settled in England, played for the English tourists. Similarly, Frank Hearne, who had previously played Test cricket for England against South Africa before settling in South Africa, played for South Africa, while his two brothers, Alec Hearne and George Gibbons Hearne, and their cousin, John Thomas Hearne, all played for England.

England in South Africa 1891–92. Match length: 3 days. Balls per over: 5. One-off Test. Result: England won

No.	Date	Home captain	Away captain	Venue	Result
37	19, 21, 22 Mar 1892	William Milton	Walter Read	Cape Town	ENG by Inns&189 runs

== Blackham's tour of England 1893 ==
Grace was injured for the first Test, so England were captained by Andrew Stoddart. The match was ruined by rain. Arthur Shrewsbury became the first cricketer to score 1,000 Test runs during his 106 in England's first innings total of 334. Australia replied with 269 and England moved to 234 for 8 declared before rain tumbled down and no further play was possible. This was the first declaration in Test cricket.

England's strong side won the second Test, aided by a 151 first wicket partnership between Stoddart and the returning Grace. After scoring 91 runs in their first innings, the Aussies were asked to follow on. AC Bannerman became the first Australian to score 1,000 Test runs. The Aussies put up much brave resistance and scored 349, but this still equated to an innings defeat, and England had retained the Ashes. England went on to play out the third Test for a draw to earn a series victory.

Australia in England 1893. Match length: 3 days. Balls per over: 5. Series result: England won 1–0.

No.	Date	Home captain	Away captain	Venue	Result
39	17, 18, 19 Jul 1893	Andrew Stoddart	Jack Blackham	Lord's	DRAW
40	14, 15, 16 Aug 1893	WG Grace	Jack Blackham	The Oval	ENG by Inns&43 runs
41	24, 25, 26 Aug 1893	WG Grace	Jack Blackham	Old Trafford	DRAW

== Stoddart's tour of Australia 1894–95 ==
In 1894/5 Andrew Stoddart led a team to Australia that played five Tests in a see-saw series that saw England win the Ashes by 3 games to 2. The first Test started as a high-scoring affair, with Australia making a then-record 586 runs thanks to 201 from Syd Gregory and 161 from George Giffen. England replied with 325 and were asked to follow-on 261 behind. They made 437 to set Australia a target of only 177. Australia reached 113–2 at close of play, needing only another 64. Rain fell overnight, and Australia allowed play to be delayed for 20 minutes as a couple of England players, including slow left-arm spinner Bobby Peel had not reached the ground on time because they were hungover. Australia fell 10 short, with Peel taking 6 wickets and Briggs 3 on a pitch that had been made helpful by the rain. This was the first time a side following-on had won a Test match.

The second Test also saw a remarkable turnaround. After being put into bat in the first instance of a Test captain electing to field after winning the toss, England made only 75. Australia responded with 123. England's second innings was completely different. Led by the captain's innings of 173, England made 475. Australia managed only 333 to leave England comfortable winners by 94 runs.

Later, in the third Test Australia (238 and 411) finally rammed home the advantage after dismissing England cheaply (124 and 143) to win by 382 runs. The match was played in searing heat. In the fourth Test England chose to field after winning the toss, collapsed twice in one day, scoring only 65 and 72 to lose by an innings. The weather had now helped even the series up at two apiece. England (385 and 298 for 4) recovered to win the deciding Test from Australia (414 and 267) by 6 wickets. With England in early trouble in the second innings, JT Brown scored 140, reaching his 50 in 28 minutes and 100 in 95.

George Giffen could consider himself unfortunate to finish on the losing side, having contributed 475 runs at an average of 52.77 and 34 wickets at 24.11. "Terror" Turner had the best average of a specialist bowler on either side, taking 18 wickets at 19.38, but he only played in three Tests, missing the third match with a chill and surprisingly being dropped for the last. For England, Tom Richardson had 32 wickets at 26.53 and Peel 27 at 26.70.

England in Australia 1894–95. Match length: Timeless. Balls per over: 6. Series result: England won 3–2.

No.	Date	Home captain	Away captain	Venue	Result
42	14, 15, 17, 18, 19, 20 Dec 1894	Jack Blackham	Andrew Stoddart	Sydney Cricket Ground	ENG by 10 runs
43	29, 31 Dec 1894; 1,2,3 Jan 1895	George Giffen	Andrew Stoddart	Melbourne Cricket Ground	ENG by 94 runs
44	11, 12, 14, 15 Jan 1895	George Giffen	Andrew Stoddart	Adelaide Oval	AUS by 382 runs
45	1, 2, 4 Feb 1895	George Giffen	Andrew Stoddart	Sydney Cricket Ground	AUS by Inns&147 runs
46	1, 2, 4, 5, 6 Mar 1895	George Giffen	Andrew Stoddart	Melbourne Cricket Ground	ENG by 6 wkts

== England's third tour of South Africa 1895–96 ==
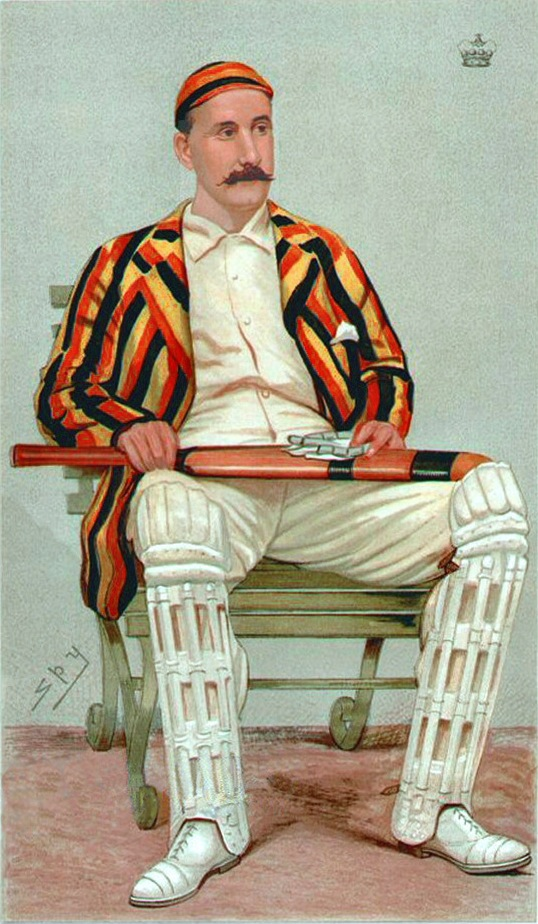
Lord Hawke

England's third tour of South Africa was a very one-sided series that was not elevated to Test status until later. England fielded 10 new caps throughout the series (8 in the first Test). The captains, a baronet and a lord, were chosen for their roles more because of their status than their cricketing ability.

The highlight of the first Test was South Africa's dismissal for a record low of 30 in their second innings, with George Lohmann taking 8 wickets for 7 runs, including a hat-trick. He had match figures of 15 for 45.

Lohmann followed this with 9 wickets for 28 runs in the first innings of the second Test, the first time a bowler had taken 9 wickets in a single Test innings. In the third Test, Lohmann took his haul of wickets to 35 at an average of 5.8.

England in South Africa 1895–96. Match length: 3 days. Balls per over: 5. Series result: England won 3–0.

No.	Date	Home captain	Away captain	Venue	Result
47	13, 14 Feb 1896	Baberton Halliwell	Sir Tim O'Brien	Port Elizabeth	ENG by 288 runs
48	2, 3, 4 Mar 1896	Baberton Halliwell	Lord Hawke	Johannesburg	ENG by Inns&197 runs
49	21, 23 Mar 1896	Alfred Richards	Lord Hawke	Cape Town	ENG by Inns&33 runs

== Trott tours England 1896 ==
The first day of the first Test was well attended: 25,414 paying customers, and possibly 30,000 spectators in total. It was a see-saw game with Australia dismissed for 53, before England got 292. Australia's 347 in their second innings left England with 108 to win, which they did with 6 wickets to spare. In the first Test Grace completed his 1,000 runs in Test cricket.

In the second Test Ranjitsinhji, the first Indian to play Test cricket, and who the MCC had not selected for the first Test, became the second batsman after Grace to score a hundred on debut for England. His 154 not out and Richardson's 13 for 244 were the highlights of the game, but it was Australian that won by 3 wickets chasing 125. During the match George Giffen became the first to complete the Test career double of 1,000 runs and 100 wickets.

Five England players (that is, professionals) threatened strike action before the start of the third Test at the Oval, Surrey's home ground, because of a dispute over match fees. They wished to be paid £20 rather than the normal going rate of £10, and were upset as they saw amateurs such as WG Grace and Walter Read seemingly earning much money from cricket despite being amateurs. They were Abel, Hayward, Lohmann and Richardson, all Surrey-players, and William Gunn of Nottinghamshire. The Surrey committee did not budge, and they put out the following statement on 10 August, the opening day of the Test:

The committee of the Surrey County Cricket Club have observed paragraphs in the Press respecting amounts alleged to be paid, or promised to, Dr WG Grace for playing in the match England v Australia. The Committee desire to give the statements contained in the paragraphs the most unqualified contradiction. During many years, on the occasions of Dr WG Grace playing at the Oval, at the request of the Surrey County Committee, in the matches Gentlemen v Players and England v Australia, Dr Grace has received the sum of £10 a match to cover his expenses in coming to and remaining in London during the three days. Beyond this amount Dr Grace has not received, directly or indirectly, one farthing for playing in a match at the Oval.

Abel, Hayward and Richardson relented, but Gunn and Lohmann refused to play. Rain prevented play until 4:55 pm. on the first day, caused 24 wickets to fall on the second, and led to Australia being dismissed for their lowest total, 44 all out chasing of 111. England had retained the Ashes.

Australia in England 1896. Match length: 3 days. Balls per over: 5. Series result: England won 2–1.

No.	Date	Home captain	Away captain	Venue	Result
50	22, 23, 24 Jun 1896	WG Grace	Harry Trott	Lord's	ENG by 6 wkts
51	16, 17, 18 Jul 1896	WG Grace	Harry Trott	Old Trafford	AUS by 3 wkts
52	10, 11, 12 Aug 1896	WG Grace	Harry Trott	The Oval	ENG by 66 runs

== Stoddart's tour of Australia 1897–98 ==
Stoddart's tour of Australia in 1897–98 ended in an emphatic victory for Australia by 4 Tests to 1. The tour matches before the Tests were well attended, with 69,195 attending the game against New South Wales, of whom 32,253 attended on the Saturday, but attendances tailed off later.

The first Test was delayed, at the instigation of the SCG to allow time for Ranjitsinhji to recover from tonsillitis and because Andrew Stoddart's mother had died. In the event, Stoddart did not play, but Ranjitsinhji did, although he did drop down to seventh in the batting order. England were captained by Archie MacLaren for the first time. The Test was dominated by an innings of 175 by Ranjitsinhji. There was a moment of controversy when Australian batsman Charlie McLeod was run out by Bill Storer when he left his crease after being bowled by a no-ball, when his deafness prevented him from hearing the umpire's call. England won comfortably by 9 wickets.

In the second Test, Stoddart was fit to play, but chose not to do so when he heard Ranji was fit again. He watched the match from the pavilion, watched by the girls below. It was suggested that he was looking for a new wife, "Whose wife?" being one reply. McLeod scored 112, getting revenge on England, who were well beaten by over an innings. There was controversy here, when Australian bowler Ernie Jones became the first Test bowler to be called for throwing. This was after Ranji had criticised Jones' bowling in the press. The third Test was won with the help of Joe Darling's 178. Darling reached his century with the first six scored in Test cricket without the aid of other throws. To get this achievement he had to hit the ball out of the ground.

In the fourth Test, Clem Hill's 188 helped Australia to a comfortable win. And they also won the fifth Test comfortable, thanks to a career-best performance from Tom Richardson, won took 8 for 94 in the first innings of his last Test match. Joe Darling became the first man to score three centuries in a Test series with 160 out of Australia's 276 runs they needed to win.

Throughout the tour Ranji and Stoddart had made disparaging comments about Australian crowds in the Australian press, which ensured the matches were played amongst great rancour. Stoddart wrote, "I shall, in all probability, never visit this country again with a cricket team, and what I have said has been purely for the good of the game, for the sake of the players in this country, and of English teams coming out here in the future." Stoddart never did tour Australia again, although at the tour's end Ranji did send an apology, and his popularity did not suffer so much as a result.

England in Australia 1897–98. Match length: Timeless. Balls per over: 6. Series result: Australia won 4–1.

No.	Date	Home captain	Away captain	Venue	Result
53	13, 14, 15, 16, 17 Dec 1897	Harry Trott	Archie MacLaren	Sydney Cricket Ground	ENG by 9 wkts
54	1, 3, 4, 5 Jan 1898	Harry Trott	Archie MacLaren	Melbourne Cricket Ground	AUS by Inns&55 runs
55	14, 15, 17, 18, 19 Jan 1898	Harry Trott	Andrew Stoddart	Adelaide Oval	AUS by Inns&13 runs
56	29, 31 Jan, 1, 2 Feb 1898	Harry Trott	Andrew Stoddart	Melbourne Cricket Ground	AUS by 8 wkts
57	26, 28 Feb, 1, 2 Mar 1898	Harry Trott	Archie MacLaren	Sydney Cricket Ground	AUS by 6 wkts

== Hawke in South Africa 1898–99 ==
Lord Hawke led a second tour to South Africa. Again, the England side was at far from full strength, with 9 Test match debuts for England in the series, most notably that of future English cricket captain Plum Warner, who carried his bat through England's second innings in the first Test for 132. The first Test was South Africa's best to date, and they were set 132 to win. But Albert Trott, who also played three Tests for Australia, took 5 for 49 to dismiss them for 99.

South Africa had a chance to record their first Test victory in the second Test, after dismissing England for 99, then scoring 177 themselves. 330 from England set them a challenging 246. But the South Africans collapsed again and were bowled out by Schofield Haigh (6 for 11) and Trott (4 for 19) for a feeble 35 off only 114 balls.

Murray Bisset, who was a little under 23 years old, was the youngest Test captain at time and remained so for more than 50 years. He later became the chief justice of Rhodesia and earned a knighthood.

England in South Africa 1898–99. Match length: 3 days. Balls per over: 5. Series result: England won 2–0.

No.	Date	Home captain	Away captain	Venue	Result
58	14, 15, 16 Feb 1899	Murray Bisset	Lord Hawke	Johannesburg	ENG by 32 runs
59	1, 3, 4 Apr 1899	Murray Bisset	Lord Hawke	Cape Town	ENG by 210 runs

== English summer of 1899 ==
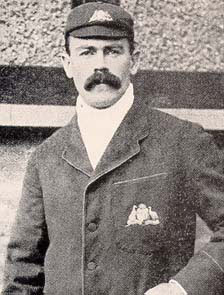
Joe Darling

It was known that the Australian side that would tour in 1899 would be a strong one, probably the strongest since 1882. And for the first time in England, 5 Tests were going to be played. MCC and the counties appointed a selection committee for the first time. It comprised 3 active players: Lord Hawke, WG Grace and HW Bainbridge the captain of Warwickshire. Prior to this, England teams for home Tests had been chosen by the club on whose ground the match was to be played.

The first Test was also the first Test ever played at Trent Bridge, Nottinghamshire's home ground. Australia had the better of a drawn game: having set England 290 to win, England were 155 for 7 off 99 overs at the close.

Grace was 50 years and 320 days old on the last day of the first Test. It says a lot about The Champion that he was still worth his place as a batsman. But he could no longer bend down, so his fielding was poor, and the Nottinghamshire crowd jeered and heckled him for it every time a ball went past him at point. Grace himself put it to the selection committee that he should be dropped for the second Test, and after some debate this is what happened. Only one man has played Test cricket at a greater age. He is Wilfred Rhodes, who coincidentally made his debut in the first Test.

Archie MacLaren was selected as captain for the remaining Tests, with the Honourable Stanley Jackson being somehow overlooked for his role (at the time the "Honourable" should have swung it his way). Jackson, however, went on to captain England later. The second Test was won well by Australia, with notable performances from Ernie Jones (7 for 88 in England's first innings) and Clem Hill and Victor Trumper (both making 135 in Australia's first innings) helping the Aussies to a 10 wicket victory.

The third Test, which was the first time a Test match was played in Leeds, was drawn after rain wiped out the final day with England needing 158 runs with all second innings wickets remaining to win. Johnny Briggs had a violent epileptic seizure on the first night. He was detained in Cheadle Asylum and played no further cricket until the next season, though his illness killed him in 1902.

The fourth and fifth Tests were both draws. Between those Tests, Albert Trott, playing for the Marylebone Cricket Club against the Australians, notably hit a six off the bowling of Monty Noble that went over the pavilion at Lord's. This remains the only time someone has achieved this since the current pavilion was built. The fourth Test was also notable for WM (Bill) Bradley taking a wicket (that of Frank Laver) with his first ball in Test cricket.

Australia in England 1899. Match length: 3 days. Balls per over: 5. Series result: Australia won 1–0.

No.	Date	Home captain	Away captain	Venue	Result
60	1, 2, 3 Jun 1899	WG Grace	Joe Darling	Trent Bridge	DRAW
61	15, 16, 17 Jun 1899	Archie MacLaren	Joe Darling	Lord's	AUS by 10 wkts
62	29, 30 Jun, 1 Jul 1899	Archie MacLaren	Joe Darling	Trent Bridge	DRAW
63	17, 18, 19 Jul 1899	Archie MacLaren	Joe Darling	Headingley	DRAW
64	14, 15, 16 Aug 1899	Archie MacLaren	Joe Darling	The Oval	DRAW

== See also ==
- History of Test cricket from 1877 to 1883
- History of Test cricket from 1884 to 1889
