= History of Test cricket from 1884 to 1889 =

The history of Test cricket between 1884 and 1889 was one of English dominance over the Australians. England won every Test series that was played. The period also saw the first use of the word "Test" to describe a form of cricket when the Press used it in 1885. It has remained in common usage ever since.

In 1883 England had won the first Ashes series by beating Australia 2–1 away, though they had lost a fourth extra Test played at the end of their Australian tour. However, this last Test proved to be a blip as English dominance remained for the rest of the 1880s. Of the 19 England-Australia Tests played in the period from 1884 to 1889, England won 14, Australia 3, with 2 draws.

1889 saw the first English team to tour South Africa. England won both representative matches easily. These matches, and those on the other early English tours of South Africa, were only recognised as Tests retrospectively, the first official tour not taking place till 1905–6.

== English summer of 1884 ==
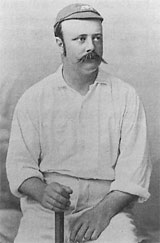
Billy Murdoch, Australia's second Test captain.

The first representative match of the 1884 season was held at Lancashire's ground, Old Trafford, making it the first such match played there. The practice at the time was that the host ground authority would select the team. First Lancashire asked Lord Harris to captain the side, but he refused as he was unhappy about the proposed selection of John Crossland, a bowler, who many considered a thrower. So Lancashire chose their captain and hero, A N Hornby instead. In the end, Crossland did not play. Billy Murdoch's Australians had the better of a draw against A N Hornby's English eleven. The game was scheduled as a three-day match, but rain made no play possible on the first day. When England did get to bat at 12.05 pm on the second day, they lost their captain in the third over, and Grace went when the score was on 13, before rain intervened yet again to delay play. After a quarter of an hour play resumed, as did the England collapse: at lunch, they were 83 for 6. The sun shone throughout the interval, making the wicket even more difficult to play. Harry Boyle finished on 6 for 42 and Fred Spofforth on 4 for 42, with England dismissed at around 3.10 pm for only 95. The Australians fared better, making 86 for 2. Three quick wickets, the third of them being George Bonnor, who was reluctant to go after being driven back onto his stumps, saw the Aussies collapse to 97 for 5. But the innings recovered, and they finished on 182. England fared much better in their second innings: it took the Australians an hour and a quarter to make their first breakthrough, although Alfred Lucas was dropped when England had only notched up six. England reached parity with only 3 wickets down—and as it was then 4.40 am on the last day, a draw was a virtual certainty. The game ended with England 180 for 9.

The second representative match was at Lord's, and the Marylebone Cricket Club selected Lord Harris as their captain (as did Surrey for the third and last match, which was at the Oval). In the second Test, Australia made 229 in their first innings. During this innings, Billy Murdoch, the Australian captain, became the first substitute fielder to take a catch in Test cricket when he caught Australia's top scorer, Tup Scott, when he was on 75. Murdoch was helping out England after WG Grace suffered a finger injury! In their first innings England slumped to 135 for 5. As Dick Barlow went out to bat, Lord Harris instructed him, "For Heaven's sake, Barlow, stop the rot!" And this is exactly what Barlow did, scoring 38 as Allan Steel added 98 runs at the other end. In all, Steel made 149 in an innings that Plum Warner recounts in his book Lord's 1787–1945 was told enthusiastically to him at the Adelaide Oval in 1911 by Australian George Giffen, who played in the match. England went on to make 379. Australia were dismissed cheaply for 145 in their second innings, thanks to 7 for 36 from George Ulyett.

The third representative match was played at the Oval. Australia won the toss, went in to bat, and despite losing Bannerman early on for 4, made 551. Ideally, they would not have spent so much time batting, as it gave them less time to bowl England out twice to level the series. But the laws of cricket did not permit declarations until 1889, so they just piled on runs. Billy Murdoch scored Test cricket's first double century (211 in total), and Percy McDonnell and Tup Scott also made centuries. England's best bowler in the innings was Lyttelton with 4 for 19. Lyttelton was the wicket-keeper (Read and Grace kept wicket when Lyttelton bowled), with all 11 Englishmen getting a bowl, which was the first time this has happened in a Test match. England struggled to 181 for 8 in reply. At which point, Walter Read, who was furious at being sent in as low as number 10, thrashed 117 off 155 balls in 113 minutes as England recovered to 346. The follow-on was enforced as a matter of routine, but England only got to 85 for 2 in the 26 overs of play that remained before the game ended as a draw. England had won the series 1–0.

Australia in England 1884. Match length: 3 days. Balls per over: 4. Series result: England won 1–0.

No.	Date	Home captain	Away captain	Venue	Result
14	10,11,12 Jul 1884	A N Hornby	Billy Murdoch	Old Trafford	DRAW
15	21,22,23 Jul 1884	Lord Harris	Billy Murdoch	Lord's	ENG by Inns&5 runs
16	11,12,13 Aug 1884	Lord Harris	Billy Murdoch	The Oval	DRAW

== Lillywhite, Shaw and Shrewsbury's second tour 1884/5 ==
James Lillywhite, Alfred Shaw and Arthur Shrewsbury had first organised a cricket tour to Australia in 1881/2. In 1884/5, they toured again, with a side which, when he was writing in 1901, Shaw considered to be the best ever to have left England. Lillywhite, who was now 42, confined himself to managing and umpiring, but Shaw and Shrewsbury played. The tour was marred by disputes over umpiring and money.

In the first representative match of the tour, Shaw's XI took on a team comprising Australians who had toured England 1884. This was the first Test match played at the Adelaide Oval. Even before the game started, there were a number of disputes. First, the English and Australian sides disputed the division of the takings. The South Australia Cricket Association intervened, and successfully mediated, but Englishmen still felt hard done by. Second, the Australians objected to Lillywhite umpiring. It is not clear why, although Lillywhite had controversially given a Victorian "not out" for a good lbw shout from Shaw in a game against Victoria in 1881/2, which was partly marred by match-fixing allegations. Therefore, two local umpires were used for the match, and there were many complaints that the Englishmen put pressure on them by over-appealing. However, they did not excel themselves for either side.

The game itself started well for Australia, who were 190 for 4 when Percy McDonnell went for 124. But they collapsed to 243 all out, after Billy Bates came on and got 5 for 31. England's reply went well, and they passed Australia's total with only 2 wickets down. Billy Barnes scored 134, as they went on to get 369. In reply, Australia, who were missing Bannerman through injury, could only make 191. England won by 8 wickets.

The Australians demanded 50% of the gate receipts for the second match at the MCG. They were turned down, and, as a result, the Australian side in this match showed 11 changes; Jack Blackham's run of playing in the first 17 Tests came to an end; for 5 Australians, this second game was the only Test they were to play. Lillywhite was allowed to umpire this Test, but it was the last time he was allowed to do so. Against this weakened Australian squad, Shaw's XI scored 401, before dismissing Australia for 279 and 126 to win by 10 wickets. Australia were 2–0 down in the series.

Back to fuller strength, Australia edged the third Test by 6 runs in a low-scoring affair at the SCG after Edwin Evans caught England's most successful batsman of the match, Wilfred Flowers at point. England's last 4 wickets fell for only 13 runs. In the fourth Test, England made 269 in their first innings. In reply George Bonnor then made 128 in 114 minutes in a magnificent innings on a bowler's pitch as Australia made 309. England chose to play their second innings on the same pitch. However, the wicket broke up and Spofforth (5 for 30) and Palmer (4 for 32) blitzed England for 77 in their second innings, off just 157 balls. Australia chose to bat on the wicket England had used in their first innings and knocked off the 38 runs they needed for the loss of only two wickets. The teams were now level on 2–2 with one match to play.

Disappointingly, the fifth Test was a one-sided affair. Australia won the toss and chose to bat on a well-watered pitch. And then tumbled to 99 for 9. Fred Spofforth, however, partially rescued them with a half-century when batting at number 11, and the Aussies ended on 163. Arthur Shrewsbury then became the first England captain to score a century as England put on 386. During Australia's second innings, Tom Garrett, one of the home players, had to deputise for umpire Hodges when Hodges refused to stand after tea on the third day because of England's complaints about his decisions. However, England were well on top, and Australia were dismissed for 125, with George McShane, who had stood as an umpire in the fourth Test, left stranded on 5 not out. England had won the series 3–2.

England in Australia 1884/5. Match length: Timeless. Balls per over: 4. Series result: England won 3–2.

No.	Date	Home captain	Away captain	Venue	Result
17	12,13,15,16 Dec 1884	Billy Murdoch	Arthur Shrewsbury	Adelaide Oval	ENG by 8 wkts
18	1,2,3,5 Jan 1885	Tom Horan	Arthur Shrewsbury	Melbourne Cricket Ground	ENG by 10 wkts
19	20,21,23,24 Feb 1885	Hugh Massie	Arthur Shrewsbury	Sydney Cricket Ground	AUS by 6 runs
20	14,16,17 Mar 1885	Jack Blackham	Arthur Shrewsbury	Sydney Cricket Ground	AUS by 8 wkts
21	21,23,24,25 Mar 1885	Tom Horan	Arthur Shrewsbury	Melbourne Cricket Ground	ENG by Inns&98 runs

== The English summer of 1886 ==
The Australian tour of 1886 again came under the financial aegis of the Melbourne Cricket Club. Before it set off the team was rated the equal to the sides of 1882 and 1884, even though, as a result of continuing discord in the Australian camp, Murdoch, Horan, McDonner, Bannerman and Massie were all missing. The claim proved over-optimistic; the tourists lost all three Tests.

The composition of the English side for the first Test at Old Trafford caused some controversy. Lancashire County Cricket Club, the ground authority, originally selected their captain A N Hornby to captain England. However, Hornby injured his leg, and Allan Steel was chosen to captain England in his stead. 10,000 attended on the first day, which, although dull and overcast in the morning, turned out fine in the afternoon and gave the English bowlers little assistance. Australia were on 181 when the fifth wicket fell. However, the last five wickets went down for 24 runs. At close of play on the first day, England were 36 for the loss of WG Grace's wicket. By lunch on the second day, after some slow scoring, England were 140 for 5. After lunch, George Ulyett and Johnny Briggs were swiftly sent back to the pavilion. George Lohmann, who was dropped with only a single to his name, however, went on to make 32 and take the England total to 223. By the end of the second day, Australia were 36 runs to the good, with six second innings wickets remaining. On the third and final day, Australia, on a crumbling wicket, were only able set England 106 to win. England lost Grace, Shrewsbury and Read early for only 24 runs, and the Australians were always threatening. But in the end England got home with 4 wickets to spare at 5.40 pm Later Dick Barlow was presented with a silk scorecard of the match in honour of his 68 runs and 7 for 44 for England.

In the second Test at Lord's, Shrewsbury played a remarkable innings of 164, the highest so far by an Englishman in Tests, on a pitch which, after a disruption for rain favoured the bowlers. His innings, which contained 3 chances, lasted for just under 7 hours. England scored 353. England lacked a fast bowler, but that seemed not to matter as Australia were bowled out cheaply for 121 and 126, with Johnny Briggs taking 11 for 74. England won by an innings and 106 runs.

At the Oval, England won the toss and chose to bat. WG Grace and William Scotton put on 170 for the first wicket, when Scotton was dismissed for only 34 after 225 minutes. Grace then went on to retake the record for the highest English Test score, finishing on 170 when he was second man out, bringing in Walter Read. Read went on to score 94 in 210 minutes. Scotton's slow scoring, particularly when compared with Grace and Read prompted London magazine Punch to print the following parody on Alfred, Lord Tennyson's "Break, Break, Break":

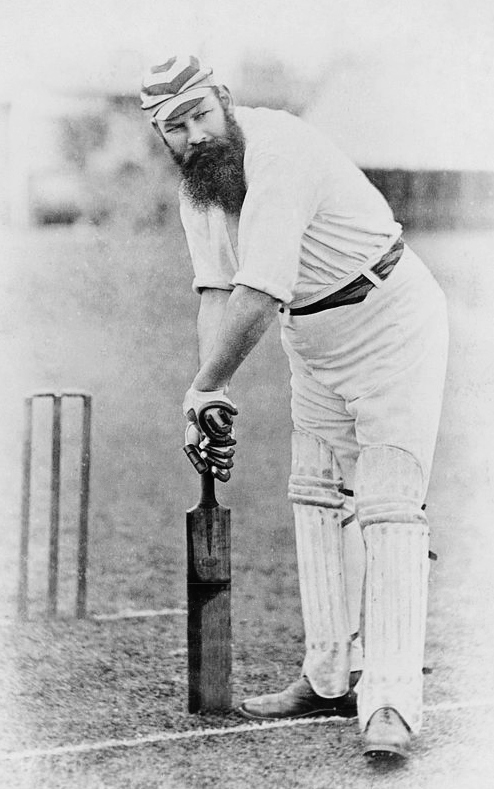
WG Grace, who scored an English-record 170 at the Oval in 1886.

Block, block, block

At the foot of thy wicket, O Scotton!

And I would that my tongue would utter

My boredom. You won't put the pot on!

Oh, nice for the bowler, my boy,

That each ball like a barndoor you play!

Oh, nice for yourself, I suppose,

That you stick at the wicket all day!

And the clock's slow hands go on,

And you still keep up your sticks;

But oh! for the lift of a smiting hand,

And the sound of a swipe for six!

Block, block, block,

At the foot of thy wicket, ah do!

But one hour of Grace or Walter Read

Were worth a week of you!

England finished on 434. When the Australians were batting, rain fell and assisted England's top bowlers, George Lohmann and Johnny Briggs, who made merry. Australia were bowled out for 68 without a bowling change. In their second innings, following-on, Australia did better, but could only make 149. Between them, Lohmann and Briggs took 18 wickets in the match, which England won by a mammoth innings and 217 runs. England had whitewashed Australia 3–0.

Australia in England 1886. Match length: 3 days. Balls per over: 4. Series result: England won 3–0.

No.	Date	Home captain	Away captain	Venue	Result
22	5,6,7 Jul 1886	Allan Steel	Tup Scott	Old Trafford	ENG by 4 wkts
23	19,20,21 Jul 1886	Allan Steel	Tup Scott	Lord's	ENG by Inns&106 runs
24	12,13,14 Aug 1886	Allan Steel	Tup Scott	The Oval	ENG by Inns&217 runs

== Lillywhite, Shaw and Shrewsbury's third tour 1886/7 ==
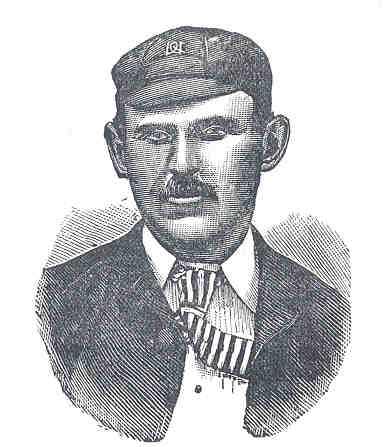
England captain and tour-promoter, Arthur Shrewsbury.

In 1886, Lillywhite, Shaw and Shrewsbury got together for a third time. Though the side was played as Shaw's XI, Shaw was too old to play much himself, as was Lillywhite. The England team was not a particularly strong one. Six of the players were from Nottinghamshire, the county of the organisers, Shaw and Shrewsbury. The side also got a reputation of playing slow, and therefore unattractive cricket, and the games were poorly promoted. They were poorly attended too.

In the first Test, the Australian captain Percy McDonnell became the first captain to invite the opposition to bat on winning the toss in a Test match. Charlie Turner and Jack Ferris bowled unchanged throughout their first innings at Test level to dismiss Shaw's Team for 45, which remains England's lowest-ever score in a Test match. By the end of the first day, Australia led by 31 with six first innings wickets remaining. On the second day, Australia moved their score on to 119. By stumps, England seemed out of it: they were only 29 runs ahead with 3 wickets remaining. The match turned on the final Monday, though. Briggs, Flowers and Scotton were able to move England to 184, setting Australia 111 to win. The wicket was in fine order, but Barnes, who took 6 for 28, assisted by Lohmann, who took 3 for 20 saw them dismissed for 97. According to Wisden, apart from one mistake, Shaw's team's fielding was "magnificent".

In the second Test, owing to injury to Barnes, the hero of the last Test, Reginald Wood, a Lancastrian now based in Melbourne was called upon to play. Barnes had injured his hand after hitting it against a wall: he had aimed a punch at the Australian captain, and McDonnell had ducked out the way. Wood's Test career consisted of coming in at number 10 and scoring 6 and 0. He did not bowl or take a catch. He played only 11 other first class games. For the Australians, Spofforth was missing (the first Test proved to be his last).

In their first innings, England made 151, with the eighth wicket contributing 57 of those runs; Ferris and Turner took five wickets apiece. George Lohmann then destroyed Australia, becoming the first man to take eight wickets in a Test innings, as the Aussies made only 84. In England's reply, "Stonewaller" Barlow top-scored with 42, as they made 154, with Ferris and Turner taking 4 wickets apiece, to leave Australia an unlikely 222 to win. This time Briggs and Flower helped Lohmann, and though three Australians made 30s, they never looked likely to make them, and lost by 71 runs. England had run up six consecutive Test victories against them. In this match, Billy Gunn both played for England and deputised as an umpire when one of the appointed umpires was absent on the final morning, and Charlie Turner became the third man to take a catch as a substitute for the opposing Test side.

A putative third Test was hoped for at the East Melbourne ground, but the bitterness that divided Australian cricket at the time meant that the Sydney players would not have played.

England in Australia 1886/7. Match length: Timeless. Balls per over: 4. Series result: England win 2–0.

No.	Date	Home captain	Away captain	Venue	Result
25	28,29,31 Jan 1887	Percy McDonnell	Arthur Shrewsbury	Sydney Cricket Ground	ENG by 13 runs
26	25,26,28 Feb 1887	Percy McDonnell	Arthur Shrewsbury	Sydney Cricket Ground	ENG by 71 runs

== England v Australia 1887/8 ==
There still was no formal organisation of international tours, with any promoter free to try to put together a touring side. However, for ten years, only one team had toured for any one Australian summer. In 1887/8 this changed. Lillywhite, Shaw and Shrewsbury put together what was to turn out to be not only their last professional tour, but the last English tour led by a professional for sixty-seven years. Their team was invited to Australia by the Melbourne Cricket Club. Shaw himself did not tour, but stayed at home to put together a football side that played rugby union and Victorian rules (now known as Australian rules) football in Australia after the cricket tour. The tour was a financial disaster, with the Melbourne Cricket Club, Lillywhite, Shaw and Shrewsbury well out-of-pocket. Lillywhite defaulted on his debt. All the English team was mostly professional, to boost the status of the team, an amateur, Aubrey Smith, was invited to captain it.

At the same time Lord Hawke, as he was soon to be, was invited by Sydney to tour with a team that only comprise amateurs. However, Hawke had to return to England at the start of the tour as his father had died, leaving George Vernon to captain the side in his stead. Both teams played "Combined Australia" sides in matches that are not accorded Test match status. They did get together to form one united England side in one Test, although there was at least one other representative match played in the season between stronger sides. In a compromise move, Walter Read was selected as captain.

The game itself was dogged by wet weather and low-scoring game. Australia won the toss and decided to field. This probably looked like the right decision as bowling sensations Ferris and Turner took 9 wickets between them to help dismiss England for 113 all out, with Arthur Shrewsbury top-scoring with 44. When Australia's turn came to bat, Lohmann and Peel, bowling unchanged, blitzed them. The Aussies were 35 for 8 at stumps on the first day. As a result of continuing rain, and an intervening Sunday, play did not resume for another 5 days. On resumption, Lohmann and Peel finished Australia off for 42. Turner's 7 for 43 was the highlight as England then set Australia 209 to win. They were never up to it as Lohmann and Peel shared 8 wickets, and England won by 126 runs.

England in Australia 1887/8. Match length: Timeless. Balls per over: 4. One-off Test. Result: England won.

No.	Date	Home captain	Away captain	Venue	Result
27	10,11,13,14,15 Feb 1888	Percy McDonnell	Walter Read	Sydney Cricket Ground	ENG by 126 runs

== English summer of 1888 ==
Australia toured with what some considered to be the weakest side to leave Australia: the touring party lost the three matches they played before leaving Australia. However, they surprised their critics by winning their first five matches. In a low-scoring Test series, seven of the ten completed innings were completed for 100 or fewer. In the first Test, England only needed 124 runs to win after getting 53 in response to Australia's 116 and 60, on a poor pitch at Lord's, but despite WG Grace's admirable 24, fell 61 runs short. This was Australia's first victory in England since the Test that started the Ashes legend 6 years before.

For the second Test, Surrey County Cricket Club, the ground authority, chose the legendary WG Grace as their captain. As a cricketer Grace was reckoned above those earlier greats, Alfred Mynn and George Parr, and it is probably more to do with the way captains were chosen in the 19th century (with away team's captains being chosen by their promoters, home team's captains chosen by the home ground authority, and deference shown to those with titles, such as Lord Harris) that Grace had not captained England sooner than his forty-first year. The England team included five Surrey players.

Although there was nothing wrong with the Oval wicket, Australia collapsed to 80 all out. Thanks to a 112 stand for the fifth wicket between Abel and Barnes, England reached 317, only for Australia to collapse again, this time to 100 to lose by an innings and 137 runs.

In the third Test, England batted first on a pitch dead after recent rain to reach 172. Australia, who had the misfortune to bat on a stickier wicket, were dismissed for 81 and from 7 for 6 recovered to 70 all out, but that still equated to a further innings defeat. It was a game decided by the toss and the rain: and ended with an English victory at 1.52 pm (before lunch) on the second day.

Australia in England 1888. Match length: 3 days. Balls per over: 4. Series result: England won 2–1.

No.	Date	Home captain	Away captain	Venue	Result
28	16,17 Jul 1888	Allan Steel	Percy McDonnell	Lord's	AUS by 61 runs
29	13,14 Aug 1888	WG Grace	Percy McDonnell	The Oval	ENG by Inns&137 runs
30	30,31 Aug 1888	WG Grace	Percy McDonnell	Old Trafford	ENG by Inns&21 runs

== South Africa's first Tests 1888/9 ==
A not particularly strong English touring team, consisting of seven county-standard players and six of good clubs standard, and that Altham compared to a weak English county, played an extremely weak nascent South African team. These games were not recognised as Tests by England at the time. Wisden's Cricketers Almanack noted that "it was never intended, or considered necessary, to take out a representative English team for a first trip to the Cape". The England team did, however, include some stars such as Briggs and Abel, and George Ulyett, who replaced a player who had to return from South Africa due to a family bereavement.

Although the English team is said not to have paid its expenses, it was otherwise financially successful. The cricketers were warmly welcomed. England were led by Aubrey Smith, who became the most widely known of England's cricket captains as a result of becoming a "B" list Hollywood star. They played all their matches, except the two that later came to be regarded as Test matches, against odds, and lost some too. Of the 19 games they played, they won 13, including the two that later became recognised as Test matches, losing four and abandoning two.

In the first Test, which was played on a green matting wicket, England beat South Africa on matting by 8 wickets by 3.30 pm on the second day. Around 3,000 spectators attended the first day.

Monty Bowden became England's youngest ever Test captain aged 23 in the Second Test, replacing an injured Smith. England scored 292 and then dismissed South Africa for 47 and 43 to record a comprehensive victory. Bowden died three years later after being trampled by his own oxen after falling from his cart. He had stayed in South Africa. His death was possibly the result of an epileptic fit. He may not have known he had ever played Test cricket. It is said that his body, which was taken to Umtali hospital, had to be protected from marauding lions before being interred in a coffin made from old whiskey cases.

England in South Africa 1888/9. Match length: 3 days. Balls per over: 4. Series result: England win 2–0.

No.	Date	Home captain	Away captain	Venue	Result
31	12,13 Mar 1889	Owen Dunell	Sir Aubrey Smith	Port Elizabeth	ENG by 8 wkts
32	25,26 Mar 1889	William Milton	Monty Bowden	Port Elizabeth	ENG by Inns&202 runs
