= Wayne Noon =

English cricketer (born 1971)

Wayne Michael Noon (born 5 February 1971) is a former professional cricket wicket-keeper and batsman.

Noon was born in Grimsby and educated at Caistor Grammar School. He played a total of 92 first-class, 121 list A and 4 twenty20 matches for Northamptonshire and Nottinghamshire between 1988 and 2003. In 1990 he captained, batted and kept wicket for the England Under-19 Cricket Team in the Australia Young Cricketers v England Young Cricketers first test.
