= Agriterra =

Agricultural investment company

Agriterra Limited
- Company type: Public limited company
- Traded as: AIM: AGTA
- Headquarters: Guernsey
- Key people: Caroline Havers (Chairperson)
- Revenue: ▲US$10.6 million (2019)
- Operating income: ▲US$(2.07) million (2019)
- Net income: ▲US$(3.1) million (2019)
- Website: www.agriterra-ltd.com

Agriterra Limited is an agricultural investment company based in Guernsey with operations in Mozambique. The company is split into two divisions; beef, which sources and processes cattle from local farms and Grain, which purchases and processes maize.

The company is listed on the Alternative Investment Market in London.
