= Geoff Cope =

English cricketer

Personal information
- Full name: Geoffrey Alan Cope
- Born: 23 February 1947 (age 79); Burmantofts, Leeds, Yorkshire, England
- Batting: Right-handed
- Bowling: Right-arm off spin

Career statistics
Competition	Test	ODI
Matches	3	2
Runs scored	40	1
Batting average	13.33	–
100s/50s	0/0	0/0
Top score	22	1*
Balls bowled	864	112
Wickets	8	2
Bowling average	34.62	17.50
5 wickets in innings	0	0
10 wickets in match	0	0
Best bowling	3/102	1/16
Catches/stumpings	1/–	0/–
- Source: CricInfo, 1 January 2006

Geoffrey Alan Cope (born 23 February 1947) played first-class cricket for Yorkshire from 1966 to 1980, and appeared in three Test matches for England.

== Life and career ==
Born on 23 February 1947, Burmantofts, Leeds, Yorkshire as the son of a French polisher, Cope grew up in Crossgates, Leeds, and first played cricket at Manston Junior School. His talent was shown in an Under 11 cup final in which he took all ten wickets for 26 and then batted his team to victory. He played club cricket at an early age with Leeds Zingari and then for Leeds Cricket Club in the Yorkshire League. He played for the club for 25 years. He played for England Schools and then, in 1964, for Yorkshire Second XI. He made his debut for the first team against Hampshire at Bradford Park Avenue with Ray Illingworth on Test duty. Despite taking 40 wickets at 13.82 in 1967, he did not earn a regular first team place until 1969, when Illingworth moved to captain Leicestershire.

He won his Yorkshire cap in 1970, but was twice forced to remodel his off-break bowling action after he was suspended in 1972, and again in 1978. "It was a bad time because you were never allowed to defend yourself," said Cope. "A committee met and made a decision, which was then passed on down the lines. You didn’t know who was on that committee or what they thought." But Dickie Bird thought that there was nothing wrong with his action. Cricket writer, Colin Bateman, noted that "Geoff Cope's career was blighted by suspicions that his off-spinner's action was illegal and twice – in 1972 and 1978 – he was suspended by Lord's. The second suspension came after he had broken through into the Test side the previous winter in Pakistan, where he came tantalisingly close to a debut hat-trick".

He worked on his action with the Yorkshire spinner Johnny Wardle and, after good seasons in 1974 and 1975, played in an England Test trial at Bristol in May 1976. Derek Underwood took four for 10 in the second innings while Cope took five for 27, as they skittled 'The Rest of England' for 48. Cope was not selected for a Test that summer, and so escaped a pummelling at the hands of the West Indies, but was selected for his first major tour, to India, Ceylon and Australia for the Centenary Test that winter. Despite a good start in the Indian tour matches he did not appear in the Test Matches as Tony Greig adopted a seam based strategy to win the series 3–1.

Ken Barrington, manager of the England team on his second tour, remarked that Cope was more accurate than Derek Underwood. He was not a big spinner of the ball, preferring to build pressure on a batsman through denying him scoring opportunities. The weakness of the Yorkshire team in the 1970s, often forced him to bowl long defensive spells against his natural attacking instincts.

He toured Pakistan in 1977–78, playing in all three of the Tests, at Lahore, Hyderabad, and Karachi, and two of the One Day Internationals, at Sialkot and Lahore, missing the first ODI at Sahiwal. He almost took a hat-trick on his Test debut: he dismissed Abdul Qadir leg before wicket, then bowled Sarfraz Nawaz first ball. The next batsman, Iqbal Qasim, was caught at slip by Mike Brearley. Despite the umpire giving him out, Brearley was not sure whether he had taken the catch cleanly and called him back to the crease.

"Iqbal Qasim came in, a little left-hander. I chose to go round the wicket and obviously we put men round the bat, 'Brears' (Mike Brearley the captain) at first slip, Graham Roope, Bob Willis, 'Both' all round the bat. I just bowled it right and it was magic really; it just turned a fraction and bounced, and 'Iqqie' nicked it. Brears just dived to his left and caught the ball about a foot off the ground, landed in front of Roopey and Willis, Iqqie just looked up the wicket at me, nodded, said, 'Well bowled'; the umpire went bananas, shaking hands and saying, 'I've never seen a hat-trick before, well bowled.' And ironically this was on my debut. 12 months previously, on the same ground, Peter Petherick of New Zealand had just done the first hat-trick ever on debut, so it would have been 12 months to the day and it would have been a unique place in history." "But Mike in landing got a lot of gravel on the back of his hand. Iqqie left the field and all the lads were up there when suddenly Brears started saying, ‘I’m going to bring him back because I don't think I caught it cleanly.' All the lads around him were adamant he had caught it a foot off the ground, but he said, 'No, for the best interests of this series I'm going to bring him back.' So he brought him back – and for the best interests of the series, six of us were lbw in our first innings. It happened, but it was a moment of disappointment because something like that on a Test debut is very special. As somebody once said, 'If bad luck hadn't been invented, we'd have had none at all!'"

Cope took 686 first-class wickets in 246 games, with a best of 8 for 73 against Gloucestershire at Bristol in 1975. His average of 24.70 compares favourably with other similar bowlers of his generation. He took his largest seasonal haul, 93 wickets at 24.13, in 1976 and averaged just 13.82 with the ball in taking 40 wickets in 1967.

He scored several first-class fifties, usually grinding affairs to stave off defeat, but never scored a century in any form of cricket. He often was sent in as a stolid nightwatchman, and opened on occasion in emergencies. He scored most of his runs with nicks and deflections behind the wicket. His highest knock was 78 against Essex at Acklam Park, Middlesbrough in 1977.

After leaving the first-class game he played for Yeadon Cricket Club, helping develop the club and the ground, before finally retiring from the game completely at 40. He was elected to the Yorkshire Committee after Brian Close retired from his seat, and appointed Yorkshire's Director of Cricket in 2002. "It's a very hard task but I'm thoroughly enjoying it," Cope said. "It's a wonderful opportunity and I've got to make the most of it."

Cope began his playing career wearing glasses and, in 1972, turned to contact lenses. Further deterioration in his sight left him officially registered blind, but though his peripheral vision is very poor, he can still see directly in front of him and watch play on the field.

Geoff Cope is a vice president at FC Halifax Town. In 2019 he was elected president of Yorkshire County Cricket Club for three years.
