= Zac Morris =

English cricketer

Personal information
- Full name: Zachary Clegg Morris
- Born: 4 September 1978 (age 48); Barnsley, Yorkshire, England
- Batting: Right-handed
- Bowling: Slow left-arm orthodox Left-arm medium
- Relatives: Alex Morris (brother)

Domestic team information
- Years: Team
- 1998–2001: Hampshire

Career statistics
Competition	First-class	List A
Matches	2	4
Runs scored	11	7
Batting average	2.75	2.33
100s/50s	–/–	–/–
Top score	10	7*
Balls bowled	205	186
Wickets	0	3
Bowling average	–	43.00
5 wickets in innings	–	–
10 wickets in match	–	–
Best bowling	–	3/31
Catches/stumpings	–/–	1/–
- Source: Cricinfo, 17 June 2022

Zachary Clegg Morris (born 4 September 1978) is an English former cricketer who played first-class and List A one-day cricket for Hampshire, in addition to playing for the England under-19 cricket team.

== Cricket career ==
Morris was born in Barnsley in September 1978. He first came to the attention of Yorkshire-based cricket coach Jack Sokell, who bought him to the attention of Yorkshire. He played for the Yorkshire Second XI, and between 1996 and 1998 he played Youth Test and One Day International cricket for the England under-19 cricket team. Morris joined Hampshire ahead of the 1998 season, alongside his brother, Alex, and Yorkshire seamer Peter Hartley. He made his debut for Hampshire in a first-class match against Gloucestershire at Southampton in the 1998 County Championship, with him making a second first-class appearance in the 1999 County Championship against Northamptonshire.

Having begun his career as a slow left-arm orthodox bowler, he later switched to become a seam bowler. Two years would elapse before he next played for the Hampshire first team, when in 2001 he made his debut in List A one-day cricket against Sussex in the Benson & Hedges Cup. In his next one-day appearance against Worcestershire in the 2001 Norwich Union League, he took three wickets, including that of Graeme Hick, for the cost of 31 runs, in addition to hitting the winning runs. He made two further one-day appearances in 2001 in the Norwich Union League, against Essex and Middlesex. Morris was banned by Hampshire for three matches in July 2001, after pleading guilty to a charge of being drunk and disorderly at Southampton Magistrates Courts and fined £120, having been arrested after being seen urinating on a roundabout the month before. He did not play for Hampshire again and was released at the end of the season, alongside John Stephenson. In 2016, he was reported to be "living and working in his native Barnsley".
