= List of international cricket centuries by Ian Bell =

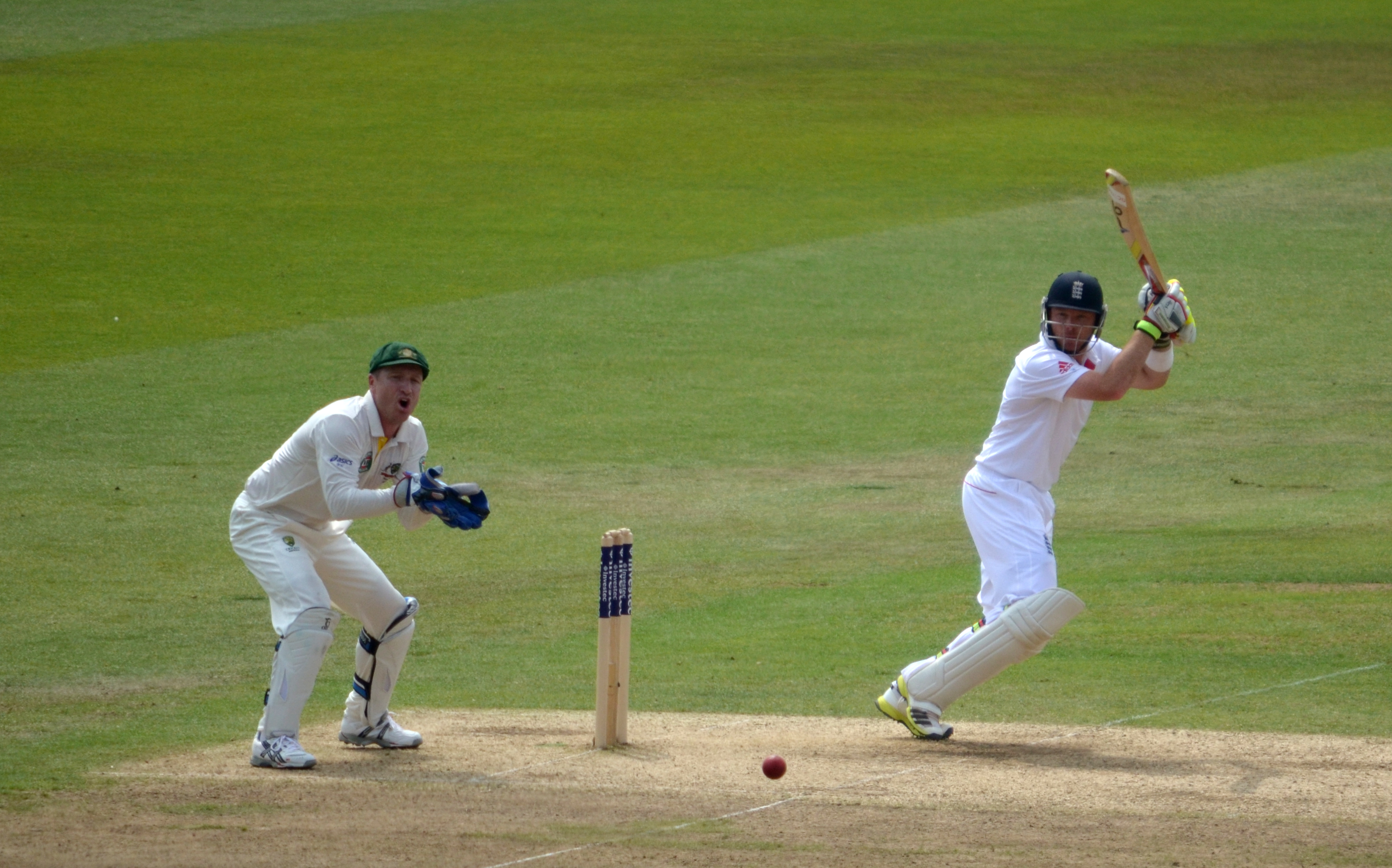
Bell batting against Australia at Trent Bridge in 2013

Ian Bell is a cricketer who represents the England cricket team. He has scored centuries (100 or more runs in a single innings) in Test and One Day International (ODI) matches on 22 and 4 occasions respectively. As of November 2015, he has played 118 Tests and 161 ODIs for England, scoring 7,727 and 5,416 runs respectively.

Bell made his Test debut in 2004 in the fourth Test against the West Indies at The Oval, scoring 70 in a ten-wicket England victory. His first century came a year later against Bangladesh at the Riverside Ground, Chester-le-Street. His highest Test score is 235 against India at The Oval. Bell has scored Test centuries at fifteen cricket grounds, including seven at venues outside England. He has scored his twenty-two Test centuries against eight different opponents; he is most successful against Australia, Pakistan and India, with four against each. England have never lost a test match in which Bell has scored a century. His dismissal for 199 against South Africa in July 2008 made him just the seventh batsman to lose his wicket on that score in Test cricket. As of November 2015, Bell is joint twenty-eighth among all-time Test century makers,^{[A]} and joint third in the equivalent list for England.

Bell's ODI debut came in 2004 against Zimbabwe at the Harare Sports Club, a match England won by five wickets. He scored 75 runs in the match, and received the man of the match award. His first century came three years later at the Rose Bowl, Southampton, scoring an unbeaten 126 in a 104-run victory over India. His highest ODI score is 141 against Australia at the Bellerive Oval, Hobart in 2015. Following the conclusion of the 2015 Ashes series, Bell announced his retirement from ODI cricket.

Bell has played eight Twenty20 International (T20I) matches, without scoring a century, his highest score being 60 not out. As of 2015, Bell is joint forty-sixth—with Garfield Sobers, Marcus Trescothick and David Boon—in the list of century-makers in international cricket, all formats of the game combined.

== Key ==
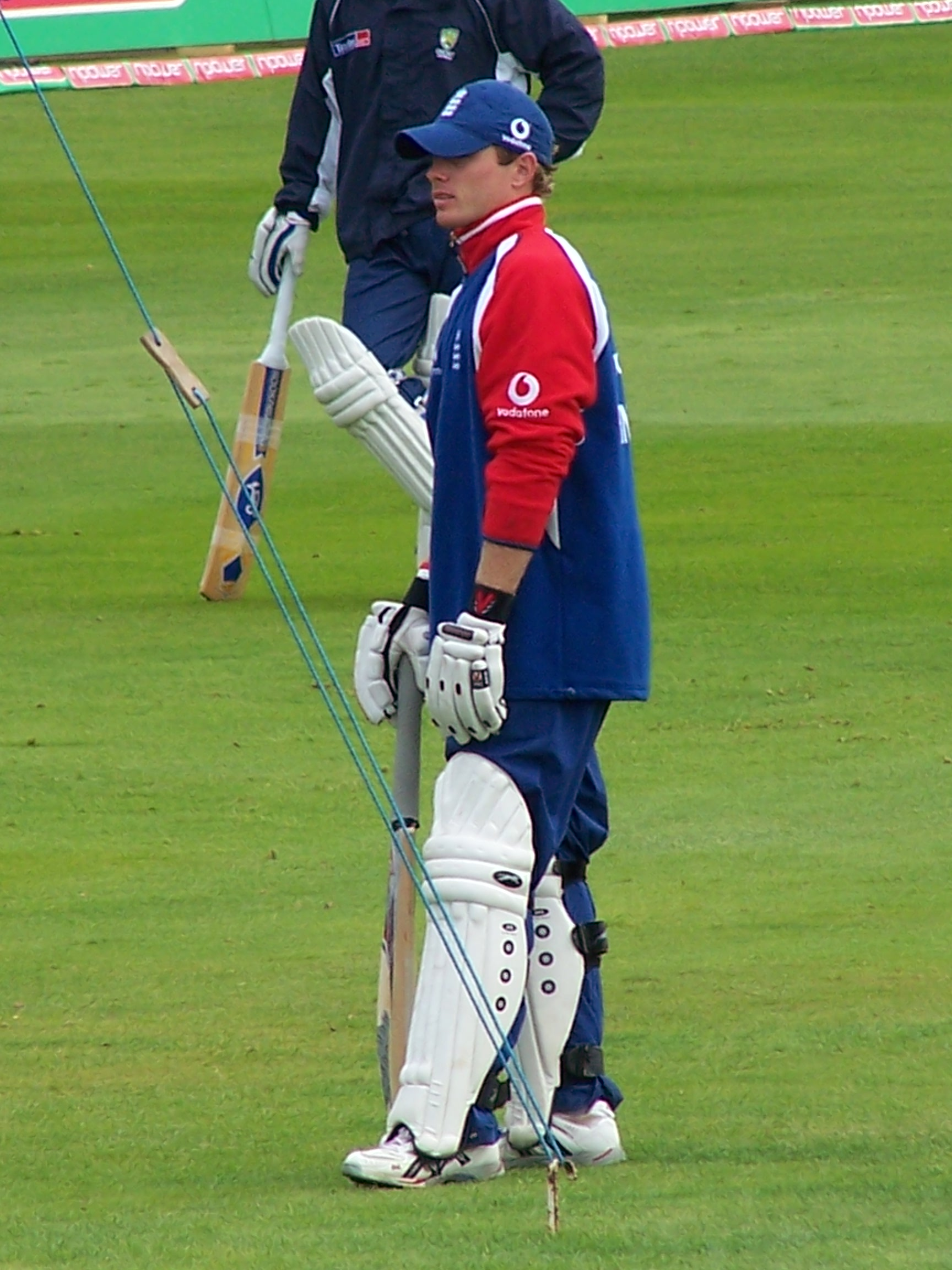
Bell has scored 26 centuries for England.

Key
Symbol	Meaning
*	Remained not out
†	Man of the match
Balls	Balls faced
Pos.	Position in the batting order
Inn.	The innings of the match
Test	The number of the Test match played in that series
S/R	Strike rate during the innings
H/A	Venue was at home (England) or away
Date	Date the match was held, or the starting date of match for Test matches
Lost	The match was lost by England
Won	The match was won by England
Drawn	The match was drawn
D/L	The match was decided using the Duckworth–Lewis method

== Test cricket centuries ==
List of Test centuries scored by Ian Bell
No.	Score	Against	Pos.	Inn.	Test	Venue	H/A/N	Date	Result	Ref
1	162*	Bangladesh	4	2	2/2	Riverside Ground, Chester-le-Street	Home	3 June 2005	Won	
2	115	Pakistan	4	2	2/3	Iqbal Stadium, Faisalabad	Away	20 November 2005	Drawn	
3	100*	Pakistan	6	1	1/4	Lord's, London	Home	13 July 2006	Drawn	
4	106*	Pakistan	6	2	2/4	Old Trafford, Manchester	Home	27 July 2006	Won	
5	119	Pakistan	6	1	3/4	Headingley, Leeds	Home	4 August 2006	Won	
6	109*	West Indies	6	1	1/4	Lord's, London	Home	17 May 2007	Drawn	
7	110	New Zealand	5	3	3/3	McLean Park, Napier	Away	22 March 2008	Won	
8	199†	South Africa	5	1	1/4	Lord's, London	Home	10 July 2008	Drawn	
9	140	South Africa	6	2	2/4	Kingsmead, Durban	Away	26 December 2009	Won	
10	138	Bangladesh	5	2	2/2	Sher-e-Bangla Cricket Stadium, Dhaka	Away	20 March 2010	Won	
11	128†	Bangladesh	5	1	2/2	Old Trafford, Manchester	Home	4 June 2010	Won	
12	115	Australia	7	2	5/5	Sydney Cricket Ground, Sydney	Away	3 January 2011	Won	
13	103*	Sri Lanka	6	2	1/3	SWALEC Stadium, Cardiff	Home	26 May 2011	Won	
14	119*	Sri Lanka	5	2	3/3	Rose Bowl, Southampton	Home	16 June 2011	Drawn	
15	159	India	3	3	2/4	Trent Bridge, Nottingham	Home	29 July 2011	Won	
16	235†	India	3	1	4/4	The Oval, London	Home	18 August 2011	Won	
17	116*	India	5	3	4/4	Vidarbha Cricket Association Stadium, Nagpur	Away	13 December 2012	Drawn	
18	109	Australia	5	3	1/5	Trent Bridge, Nottingham	Home	10 July 2013	Won	
19	109	Australia	5	1	2/5	Lord's, London	Home	18 July 2013	Won	
20	113	Australia	5	3	4/5	Riverside Ground, Chester-le-Street	Home	9 August 2013	Won	
21	167	India	4	1	3/5	Rose Bowl, Southampton	Home	27 July 2014	Won	
22	143	West Indies	4	1	1/3	Sir Vivian Richards Stadium, Antigua	Away	13 April 2015	Drawn	

== One Day International centuries ==
List of ODI centuries scored by Ian Bell
No.	Score	Balls	Against	Pos.	Inn.	S/R	Venue	H/A/N	Date	Result	Ref
1	126*†	118	India	3	1	106.77	Rose Bowl, Southampton	Home	21 August 2007	Won	
2	126†	117	West Indies	2	1	107.69	Rose Bowl, Southampton	Home	16 June 2012	Won (D/L)	
3	113*†	143	India	2	2	79.02	HPCA Stadium, Dharamshala	Away	27 January 2013	Won	
4	141	125	Australia	2	1	112.80	Bellerive Oval, Hobart	Away	23 January 2015	Lost	

== Notes ==
A. Bell is joint twenty-eighth in all-time Test century makers along with Wally Hammond, Mohammad Azharuddin, Colin Cowdrey and Geoffrey Boycott.
