= Paul Collingwood =

English cricketer

Paul Collingwood MBE
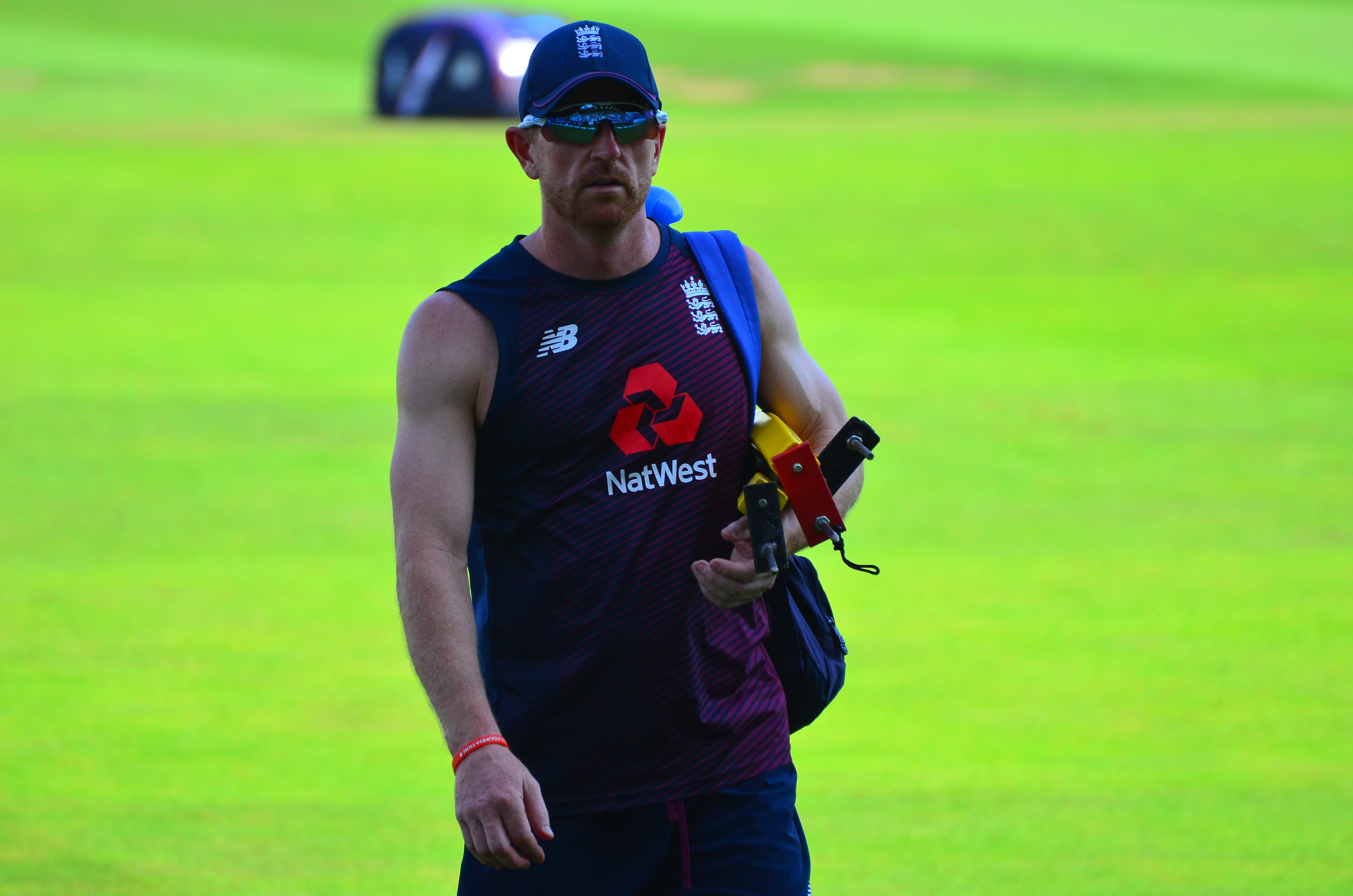
- Collingwood in 2019

Personal information
- Born: 26 May 1976 (age 50); Shotley Bridge, County Durham, England
- Nickname: Colly, Brigadier Block
- Height: 5 ft 11 in (1.80 m)
- Batting: Right-handed
- Bowling: Right-arm medium
- Role: All-rounder

International information
- National side: England (2001–2011)
- Test debut (cap 622): 2 December 2003 v Sri Lanka
- Last Test: 3 January 2011 v Australia
- ODI debut (cap 162): 7 June 2001 v Pakistan
- Last ODI: 11 March 2011 v Bangladesh
- ODI shirt no.: 5 (previously 50)
- T20I debut (cap 1): 13 June 2005 v Australia
- Last T20I: 13 September 2017 v Pakistan
- T20I shirt no.: 5

Domestic team information
- Years: Team
- 1995–2018: Durham (squad no. 5)
- 2009–2010: Delhi Daredevils (squad no. 5)
- 2011–2012: Perth Scorchers
- 2012: Impi

Career statistics
Competition	Test	ODI	FC	LA
Matches	68	197	306	428
Runs scored	4,259	5,078	16,938	11,240
Batting average	40.56	35.51	35.65	34.26
100s/50s	10/20	5/26	35/85	10/65
Top score	206	120*	206	132
Balls bowled	1,905	5,144	12,706	11,482
Wickets	17	111	166	273
Bowling average	59.88	38.46	38.53	33.80
5 wickets in innings	0	1	2	1
10 wickets in match	0	0	0	0
Best bowling	3/23	6/31	5/52	6/31
Catches/stumpings	96/–	108/–	352/–	207/–
- Source: ESPNcricinfo, 27 September 2018

Paul David Collingwood MBE (born 26 May 1976) is an English cricket coach and former player, who played in all three formats of the game internationally for England. He played for Durham County Cricket Club. Collingwood was a regular member of the England Test side and captain of the One Day International (ODI) team (2007–2008). He was the first T20I captain for England. As captain, he led the England team to win their first ICC trophy, the 2010 World Twenty20, and scored the winning run in the final.

He captained his county club, Durham County Cricket Club, for the final six seasons of his career. A batting all-rounder, whose batting combined natural strokeplay with great tenacity, Collingwood also bowled reliable medium pace. Described as a "natural athlete", he was regarded as one of the finest fielders of his time, usually fielding at backward point or at third or fourth slip in Tests; he also deputised as wicket-keeper for England.

His first-class debut was in 1996 and he made his first appearance for England in One Day International cricket in 2001 and made his Test match debut in 2003. For two years he remained an occasional Test player but after selection for the final Test of the 2005 Ashes, he secured a regular place. His 206 during the 2006–07 Ashes was the first double century by an England batsman in Australia for 78 years and in a match that England lost. A series of three consecutive match-winning performances by Collingwood at the end of the 2006–07 Commonwealth Bank Series in Australia brought him enthusiastic approval in the British media. His "allround display of incredible nerve and tenacity" helped to secure the trophy for England. Until May 2019, he was England's most capped ODI cricketer and was, until surpassed by Ian Bell in 2015, the leading ODI run scorer.

He announced his retirement from Test cricket in January 2011, during the fifth Test of the 2010–11 Ashes series. He finished on a high, becoming a three-times Ashes winner as England won a series in Australia for the first time in 24 years, with three innings victories contributing to a 3–1 win. He retired from first-class and List A cricket in September 2018.

Having retired from playing, Collingwood moved into coaching. He was part of the coaching team for Scotland and for Durham CCC, before joining the staff of the England Cricket Team in 2014 as a limited-overs specialist and fielding coach. In February 2022, he was named interim head coach of the men's England cricket team.

== Early and personal life ==
Collingwood was born and brought up in Shotley Bridge, near Consett, County Durham, by parents David and Janet, along with his elder brother Peter, and was educated at Blackfyne Comprehensive School, now known as Consett Academy. Introduced to cricket "on the playing fields of Blackfyne Comprehensive School", Paul was able to "force his way into Shotley Bridge's Under–13s team at the age of just nine".

As a teenager, his father, who still remains a member of the Shotley Bridge Cricket Club, persuaded him to give up football and concentrate on cricket. Collingwood still makes regular visits to his old cricket club: "...he is a brilliant role model for the kids and his success is an inspiration to follow...".

He currently lives in Northumberland, divorced from former wife Vicky, whom he married in February 2005 in Cape Town, South Africa, and their three daughters Shannon (born September 2006), Keira (born 24 February 2008), and Hannah Mae (born 9 February 2011). He is a big fan of Sunderland AFC. His nicknames are 'Colly', 'Weed', ‘Brigadier Block’ and 'Shep'; Brigadier Block being a nickname given to him by Nasser Hussain for his ability to play defensive shots, and the latter is an apparent homage to the famous Blue Peter Collie dog, Shep.

== Domestic career ==
=== County cricket ===
Paul Collingwood signed for Durham, his local county cricket side, in 1995, playing first in List A one-day cricket. When he first came to Durham's attention, Collingwood was regarded "as a bowler who batted a bit". According to coach Geoff Cook's 2006 assessment it was Collingwood's determination, rather than his talent, that shone through.

Paul had talent... but I don't think he had any more [talent] than a number of lads who came through with him at the time...He had terrible luck with his back, he missed an awful lot of cricket, and a lesser character could well have decided to call it a day. To his credit, Paul came back and worked harder than he'd ever done before. He couldn't bowl as much at the start, so he did an awful lot more batting and, straight away, there were obvious signs of talent there. By the time he forced his way into the Under-19 team he was batting at the top of the order and the following year he was offered a professional contract.

Collingwood made his first–class debut against Northamptonshire in 1996, at Durham's Riverside Ground. He made an immediate impression by taking the wicket of former England all-rounder David Capel with his first ball, and scoring 91 in his first innings. However, his early years as a first-class player were characterised by steady and relatively modest performances with bat and ball: in each season from 1996 to 2000, his batting average was between 20 and 30 and his bowling average was between 30 and 60.

His breakthrough began in 2000, when he was voted Player of the Year by the Durham members, particularly for his one-day efforts. His form varied following a back injury, but he hit his stride in 2001, when he excelled both in the County Championship and in the one-day game. In the six English seasons from 2001, Collingwood has exceeded a batting average of 40 four times and achieved a bowling average of less than 40 on three occasions.

In order to improve his all-round game, Collingwood travelled to Australia for the 2000–01 season, where he played for the Richmond Cricket Club in the Melbourne Premier League. At the end of the season, he was awarded the Jack Ryder Medal as the best player in the league, which he shared with another player. He remains the first and, to date, only Richmond player to have received the award.

Durham only achieved first-class status in 1992. In the 15 years since then, their best performances in the two league championships (the first-class County Championship and the List-A (One-Day) National League) both came in 2006 (finishing sixth and eighth respectively). Following in 2007 with the Friends Provident Trophy, beating Hampshire by 125 runs, Collingwood picking up 22 runs and bowling figures of 3/33. However, Collingwood's involvement was severely limited by his England commitments and he made no appearances at all in either competition.

This stood in marked contrast to the previous season, when Collingwood was available to Durham for four of the five Tests, before his England recall for the final Ashes Test; he "pushed his claims for a Test recall with three centuries in four innings in the Frizzell County Championship." In just 13 appearances in the County Championship in that 2005 season, Collingwood scored 1103 runs and took 21 wickets, averaging 55.15 and 31.90 respectively.

In the traditional reward for services to a county, Durham awarded Collingwood a benefit year for 2007. He chose to support two charities through his benefit, Marie Curie Cancer Care and the Cricket Foundation's "Chance to Shine" project, which encourages cricket coaching in state schools. In that same year, two days after achieving his fifth Test century at Riverside in an England victory, he joined Liam Plunkett in helping the county enter its first Friends Provident Trophy final, which they would also go on to win.

=== Indian Premier League ===
With England players free to participate in the second season of the Indian Premier League, Collingwood was signed by the Delhi Daredevils for $275,000 during their second player auction. In the 2011 auction, he was signed up by Rajasthan Royals for US$250,000, but could not take part in IPL4 due to a knee injury that he picked up during the World Cup.

== International career ==
=== England debut ===
Collingwood's form for Durham in 2001 earned him a call-up to the England One Day International (ODI) squad, selected for the NatWest Series against Pakistan and Australia that summer, becoming the 162nd to play for England in ODI cricket. He was not particularly successful on his ODI debut in June 2001, scoring only two runs and taking no wickets against Pakistan at Edgbaston, and doing poorly (20 runs in four innings and no wickets) in the rest of the series. Despite this, the selectors showed confidence in him by choosing him for the 2001–02 one-day tour of Zimbabwe, where he took his first ODI wicket, that of Dion Ebrahim in the Third ODI at Harare Sports Club. He starred with the bat in the Fourth ODI at Queens Sports Club, Bulawayo, with a match-winning 77, and made an unbeaten 56 in the final ODI, also in Bulawayo, helping England secure a 5–0 whitewash.

Collingwood played in all seven matches of the 2002 NatWest Series against India and Sri Lanka, ending on the losing side in the final to India. Neither his batting nor bowling during this series were particularly impressive, averaging less than 24 with the bat and taking only five wickets in the series, but he went on to make his first ODI century in the 2002/2003 VB Series victory against Sri Lanka at the WACA. While this performance cemented his position in the England one–day setup, he dislocated his right shoulder while fielding in a pre–season county friendly against Lancashire and was forced to miss most of the 2003 season. Nevertheless, he was awarded a 12-month ECB contract when the winter touring squads were announced for Bangladesh and Sri Lanka. With Nasser Hussain suffering from a bout of 'flu, Collingwood made his Test debut against the Sri Lankans in the First Test at Galle in December 2003, becoming the 622nd Englishman to play Test cricket. It was during this game that he established his position as one of the best English fielders, with five catches and a run-out in the drawn match. Since then his performances in the field have drawn comparisons with South African specialist fielder, Jonty Rhodes.

With the selection of pace bowler James Anderson for the Third Test, Collingwood was dropped. Although unable to establish a regular place in the 11-man team, his all–round ability and fielding strengths made him a regular on England's overseas Test tours as 12th Man.

He retained his place in England's one-day side throughout the summer of 2004 despite a knee injury, and scored an unbeaten 79 in the second match of the NatWest Challenge against India at The Oval, with England winning the series 2–1. Collingwood was also England's second highest run-scorer in the 2004 ICC Champions Trophy, scoring 141 runs at an average of 70.5, which included an unbeaten 80 in the opening game against Zimbabwe. He played in all 11 ODIs against Zimbabwe and South Africa, and was then named in the England Development Squad in May 2005, and the 14-man squad for the NatWest Series against Bangladesh and Australia and the NatWest International Twenty20 against Australia that summer.

=== Ashes 2005 ===
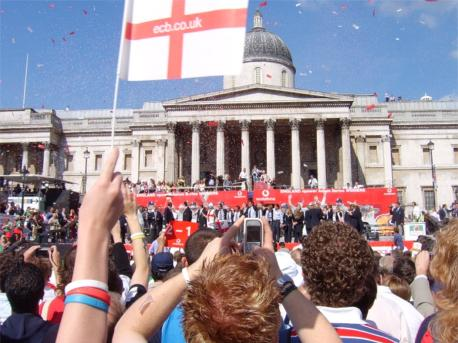
The England team celebrate their 2005 Ashes victory in Trafalgar Square

On 21 June 2005, playing for England against Bangladesh at Trent Bridge, Collingwood scored 112 not out from 86 balls and then took six wickets for 31 runs. These were the best–ever bowling figures by an Englishman in an ODI, and made Collingwood the first player to score a century and take six wickets in an ODI. This performance surpassed the previous best all–round ODI performance, that of Viv Richards, who scored a hundred and took five wickets against New Zealand in Dunedin in the 1986/1987 season. Another highlight that was produced that same series was a stunning mid-air catch off the bowling of Steve Harmison to dismiss Matthew Hayden during the Natwest Series ODI at Bristol. This catch was included in BBC Sport's list of "Classic catches" in cricket.

Collingwood also played in England's inaugural Twenty20 International match, held at the Rose Bowl, where a useful contribution of 49 and the wickets of Brett Lee and Jason Gillespie helped jump-start England on its pursuit of the Ashes, with 100-run defeat of Australia.

Collingwood was selected for the Test squad at the outset of the series but was not called into action until bowler Simon Jones was ruled out due to injury during the Fourth Test at Trent Bridge. Collingwood therefore played only the Fifth Test. Although he only scored 7 and 10 with the bat that match, his "blocking" alongside Kevin Pietersen in a 60-run sixth wicket stand on the final day helped England draw the match, and clinch the series to take the Ashes for the first time since 1987. In the 2006 New Year's Honours List, Collingwood was awarded the MBE, together with other members of the England team, for his role in the successful Ashes victory. There was some critical comment that his limited role did not warrant the honour as he had played only in the Fifth Test and scored just 17 runs in 2 innings.

=== Success in Pakistan and India ===
Following the successful Ashes campaign in 2005, Collingwood was selected to tour with England to Pakistan and India in 2005–06. He played in the First Test in against Pakistan in Multan in 2005, but scored only 13 runs in his two innings and took no wickets. He was dropped for the Second Test as Michael Vaughan returned, but came back into the team for the Third Test against Pakistan when the top–order was reshuffled after Andrew Strauss returned to England for the birth of his first child. Despite Collingwood making his maiden Test 50 and following it with another in the second innings, England lost the match and consequently the three-match series 2–0. In the ODI series, he and Durham teammates Liam Plunkett and Steve Harmison accounted for the majority of the wickets taken by England, through a combination of their bowling and fielding.

Following his performance in Pakistan, Collingwood was called into the England team for the First Test against India in March 2006 after injury and illness respectively to Vaughan and Marcus Trescothick. Collingwood justified his position in the team with a magnificent 134 not out in the first innings on 2 March 2006, his first Test century. Collingwood thus became the first Durham player to make a Test century for England. Following this innings, The Times, which had been among the critics of Collingwood's MBE, ran the headline, "MBE? Give this man a knighthood!"

=== Sri Lanka and Pakistan in 2006 ===
Collingwood kept his place for the first three Tests against Sri Lanka in the summer of 2006. Uncharacteristically, he dropped two catches during the First Test at Lord's, but he scored an unbeaten half-century. He went on to make up for the dropped catches in the Second Test at Edgbaston, where he took five catches in two innings while playing his usual batting style as foil (with Andrew Flintoff) to Kevin Pietersen's 142 in the first innings. In the subsequent Twenty20 International match against Sri Lanka, he took 4–22, the best bowling record in Twenty20 Internationals, but still ended on the losing side.

He then followed this up with an important innings in the First Test against Pakistan later that summer, scoring his second Test century. On this occasion he was the dominant partner, batting for most of his innings with rookie Alastair Cook. When Cook departed, he continued with Ian Bell to complete his 150 before at last being removed by Danish Kaneria for 186. This score proved to be England's highest of the series.

Collingwood took his first Test wicket on 6 August 2006, trapping Faisal Iqbal leg before wicket for a golden duck in the Third Test at Headingley. During this series he also bowled a couple of overs of off-spin, to the surprise of many, including the commentary team on Test Match Special. Later that summer, he reached his 100th ODI cap and 50 ODI wickets in the same match by claiming the wickets of Inzamam-ul-Haq and Abdul Razzaq during the Fifth ODI against Pakistan in Birmingham on 10 September.

=== Ashes 2006/07 ===
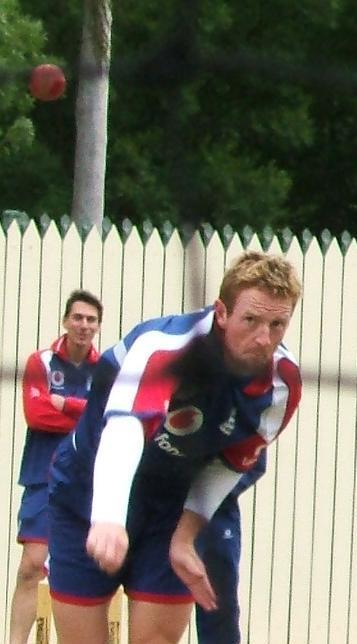
Collingwood bowling in the nets at Adelaide Oval

Following a successful summer, Collingwood was selected later in 2006 for both the 2006 ICC Champions Trophy squad and Ashes touring party. However, after two lacklustre defeats to India and Australia, critics such as Geoffrey Boycott and some fans began to question the coaching staff's placement of him in the batting order.

The return of Andrew Flintoff following an injury would reignite the ongoing debate about which two of Cook, Bell and Collingwood should be included in the team, with many speculating that Collingwood would be the man to miss out. With the sudden departure of Marcus Trescothick from the tour just over a week before the First Test, the debate was settled for the time being.

The first ball of the First Test, at the Gabba in Brisbane, bowled wildly wide by Steve Harmison set the tone for the series. However, on the fourth day, England seemed to be batting towards a draw, when Collingwood, who had worked his way to a hard–earned 96 was stumped "...skipping miles down the pitch and trying to smack Warne over his head to reach a hundred". This was a pivotal moment: England went on to lose the next six wickets for 126 runs, and so lost the Test match. In the Second Test at Adelaide, Collingwood made a career-best 206 in England's first innings, sharing in a 310–run fourth–wicket stand with Pietersen; he became only the eighth English double centurion against Australia in Ashes history, and the first in Australia since Wally Hammond scored 251 and 200 in consecutive innings during the 1928–29 Ashes. In the second innings he added an unbeaten 22 from 119 balls over nearly 3 hours, while England collapsed to 129 all out and so went 2–0 down. Collingwood received some praise but mostly criticism from commentators on the manner in which he batted with the tail-enders.

England fared no better in the Third and Fourth Tests, losing them both, with Collingwood picking up only 60 with the bat in his four innings. During the Fifth Test at the Sydney Cricket Ground in January 2007, Australia's Shane Warne revived the controversy of Collingwood's MBE with clearly audible "sledging" at Collingwood's expense. Collingwood's performance during this Test was mediocre, scoring 27 and 17 with the bat and not being called upon to bowl a single ball, as Australia won comfortably by ten wickets.

Despite the series ending with a 5–0 whitewash by Australia, Collingwood finished the series ranked 14th in the LG ICC World Rankings for Test batsmen.

The Commonwealth Bank One-Day International Series began on a low note for Collingwood, with a loss in the opening game against Australia at the Melbourne Cricket Ground. Despite the defeat being followed by a narrow win over New Zealand in Hobart, the team and Collingwood went into a rapid decline, losing a string of four matches. He missed England's 92–run victory over Australia due to food poisoning, but returned to make 106 and capture two wickets in the decisive 14–run victory over New Zealand in the final group stage match. He then hit a century and scored the winning runs as England won the first of three finals in Melbourne, against Australia, becoming the eighth Englishman to hit centuries in consecutive ODIs. His innings of 120 not out was the highest ever by an English ODI player against Australia in Australia. His knock was named as the fourth-best ODI Batting Performance of the year by ESPNcricinfo. In the second of the finals, he was Man of the Match for the third consecutive game, top–scoring for England with 70 and taking two wickets, as well another difficult catch off the bowling of Sajid Mahmood to once again dismiss Matthew Hayden.

=== World Cup 2007 ===
Flush with confidence and in form from the tri-series victory, Collingwood and the English arrived in the Caribbean with high hopes. However, two unimpressive performances by the team during the warm-up matches against Bermuda and Australia, followed by defeat to New Zealand in the first Group match dampened expectations. This was coupled with the removal of Andrew Flintoff from the vice-captaincy due to an incident of unruly behaviour, which led to speculation that Collingwood would be in line for the captaincy should either Michael Vaughan or Andrew Strauss be unavailable. However, all such discussion came to nought as Vaughan remained in charge, despite the reprimanding of Flintoff.

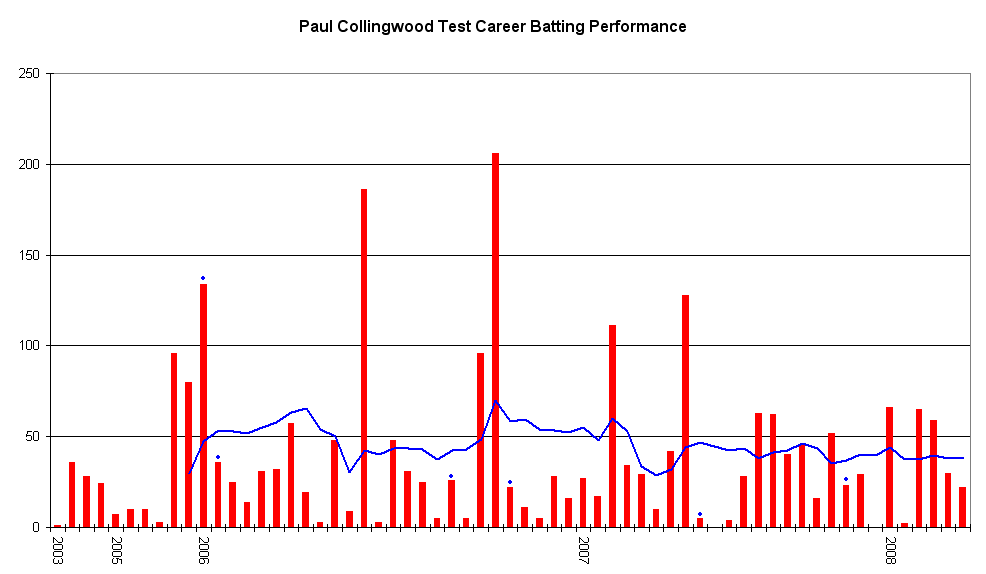
An innings-by-innings breakdown of Collingwood's Test match batting career, showing runs scored (red bars) and the average of the last ten innings (blue line).

The tournament was uneventful for Collingwood and the English, as he and the team were soon left by the wayside after qualification into the Super Eight round. Unimpressive victories over Ireland followed by a nervy 37-run seventh wicket stand with Paul Nixon to victory over Bangladesh along with a close 2-run loss to Sri Lanka and heavy losses to Australia and South Africa meant elimination from the knockout stages, as Collingwood was only able to manage lower scores with limited successes with the white ball. He did, however, end up as the tournament's joint top fielder, grabbing eight catches along with Graeme Smith, and took what is arguably his most stunning catch, to dismiss Devon Smith off the bowling of Andrew Flintoff during the final Super Eight match versus the West Indies.

=== 2007 season ===
Collingwood and the team opened their first home Test at Lord's with a dominant first innings against the West Indies, as Collingwood's score of 111 joined Alastair Cook, Ian Bell, Matt Prior and Kevin Pietersen in becoming the first ever group of five Englishmen to score centuries at Lord's in the same match. This was followed up during the opposition innings with his second Test wicket, that of Dwayne Bravo. He then added his second century of the series at Durham's home ground at Chester-le-Street during the fourth Test, hitting 128 from 188 balls as part of a 169-run seventh-wicket stand with Prior before being bowled by Corey Collymore. Following his good form in the Test series, Collingwood was named as captain of the England team for the two Twenty20 Internationals and three One-Day International games against the West Indies, following previous captain Michael Vaughan's resignation of the position of captain in the format four days before. Of the Twenty20s, England lost the first but won the second to draw Collingwood's first Twenty20 International series as a captain. While only contributing 27 from 24 balls in the second match, Collingwood outshone the other English batsmen with his individual effort during the first, hitting 79 runs from just 41 deliveries. The England team continued into the 50-over ODI matches, winning the first by a comfortable 79 under Collingwood's captaincy, though the man himself hit only 5 runs. He went on to captain the one-day side against India, where they won the 1st ODI but lost an entertaining 2nd ODI at Bristol by 9 runs. After the 2nd ODI Collingwood was fined half of his match fee for a slow over rate. England eventually won the closely fought series 4–3.

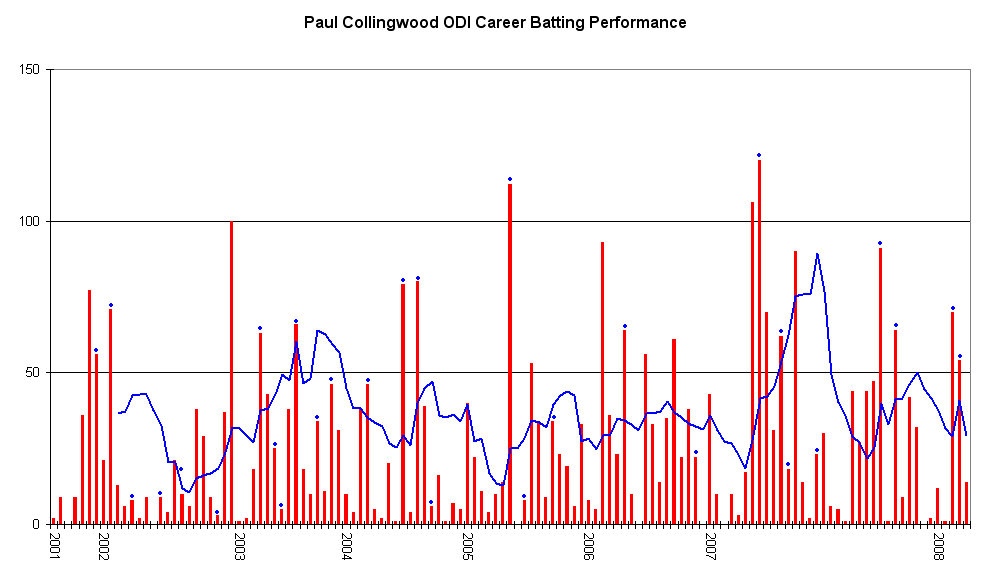
An innings-by-innings breakdown of Collingwood's One–day International batting career, showing runs scored (red bars) and the average of the last ten innings (blue line).

Collingwood was fined £1000 during the 2007 Twenty20 World Championship when he visited a lap-dancing club prior to England's match with New Zealand. Collingwood led the team to victory over Zimbabwe in the group stages of the tournament, but England, under his leadership, were later defeated by Australia, New Zealand, South Africa and India to go out of the competition before the final stages. During England's subsequent tour of Sri Lanka Collingwood led the team to victory in the ODI Series. In the later Test series, he became the 709th Test wicket of Muttiah Muralitharan, who thus overtook Shane Warne as the highest Test wicket taker.

=== 2008 ===
Collingwood enjoyed a successful Test series away in New Zealand in early 2008, scoring 244 runs from three matches at 40.66, passing 50 three times. His ODI game also enjoyed success – 151 runs at 50.33 with two half-centuries from his four ODI matches. Collingwood had a less successful home series, however, scoring only 32 runs in three matches, 24 of these in one innings, and ended the series with an average of just 10.66. His home ODI series was one of great controversy. While playing in the fourth match, he appealed controversially for the run-out of Grant Elliott after Elliott had collided with Ryan Sidebottom and injured himself. While this action drew criticism from the New Zealand dressing room, there was separate incident in this match (relating to an inadequate England over-rate), for which the ICC banned Collingwood for four limited-overs internationals. This was for a second offence in twelve months relating to England, with Collingwood as captain, completing its overs outside of the time limit. Pietersen was called upon to take over as captain.

Collingwood's poor form continued into the first Test of South Africa's tour of England in July 2008, as he scored only seven runs in his first innings at Lord's, although replays suggested an umpiring error, the ball hitting not his bat but only his pad. He was left out of the side for the following Test at Headingley, making way for Andrew Flintoff, but was recalled for the third Test at Edgbaston, scoring a century and giving England a chance of beating South Africa and levelling the series.

Half an hour after Michael Vaughan resigned from the Test captaincy, Collingwood relinquished charge of the ODI squad because it was affecting his ability to enjoy the game. Collingwood told his wife on the night before his century against South Africa that it was time to go. He later explained, "I've found the extra workload to be very difficult [...]. It's mentally tiring, and that's the top and bottom of it. I want to have a smile on my face when I'm playing cricket, and, if I'd have kept going, I'm not sure that would have been the case."

=== 2009 ===
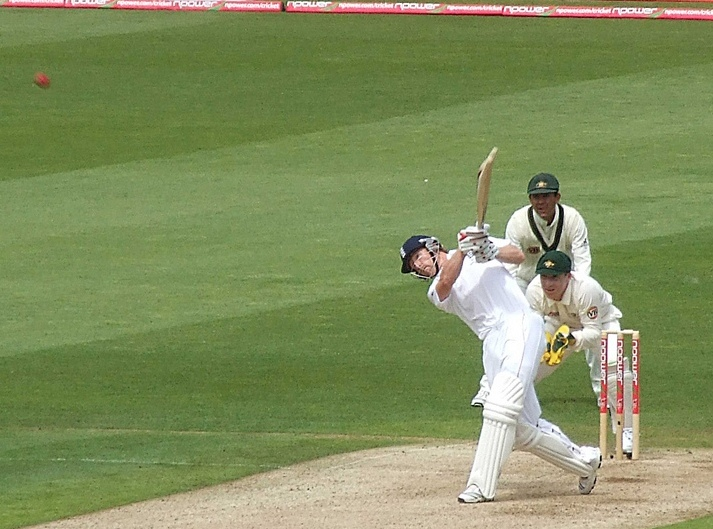
Collingwood plays down the ground during the first Test of the 2009 Ashes at the SWALEC Stadium.

Collingwood deputised as England wicket-keeper for an injured Matt Prior in the second home Test against the West Indies in May 2009; he enjoyed the experience and was generally successful, including effecting a catch from an edge by Shivnarine Chanderpaul.

Collingwood's form in the 2009 World Twenty20 tournament wasn't good: in five innings, managing just 63 runs. More important, however, was his form in the longest version of the game, in which he had attained something like a peak. Going into the 2009 Ashes, indeed, he was relishing his best-ever run in the Test side, having hoarded three centuries in his last twelve innings.

In the first Test of the 2009 Ashes at the SWALEC Stadium in Cardiff, Collingwood scored 64 in the first innings as England totalled 435. On a flat wicket, however, this was put into context by the Australians, who amassed 674 for 6 declared, with four centurions; Collingwood bowled nine overs, and claimed the wicket of Brad Haddin caught at deep midwicket. In reply, England slid to 70 for 5 and seemed certain to succumb to an innings defeat. In response, Collingwood stayed at the crease for 5¾ hours (nearly the whole of the final day) and top-scored for England with 74 runs from 245 balls. He was ninth man out, edging Peter Siddle to gully, but final pair James Anderson and Monty Panesar blocked out the final 11½ overs of the match to secure an improbable draw.

In the second Test at Lord's Collingwood succumbed to a loose first-innings dismissal, chipping part-time spinner Michael Clarke to mid-on for 16 (and earning the ire of his captain Andrew Strauss, who went on to score 161); England, poised at 302 for 3 before Collingwood's dismissal, subsided to 425 all out. Nonetheless, England's seamers bowled Australia out for 215, and in the second innings Collingwood scored a measured 54, acting as foil to the aggressive strokeplay of Matt Prior (their partnership adding 86 in twelve overs) and Andrew Flintoff (51 in eight overs). As Flintoff and Graeme Swann combined to bowl England to victory, Collingwood contributed two fine slip catches.

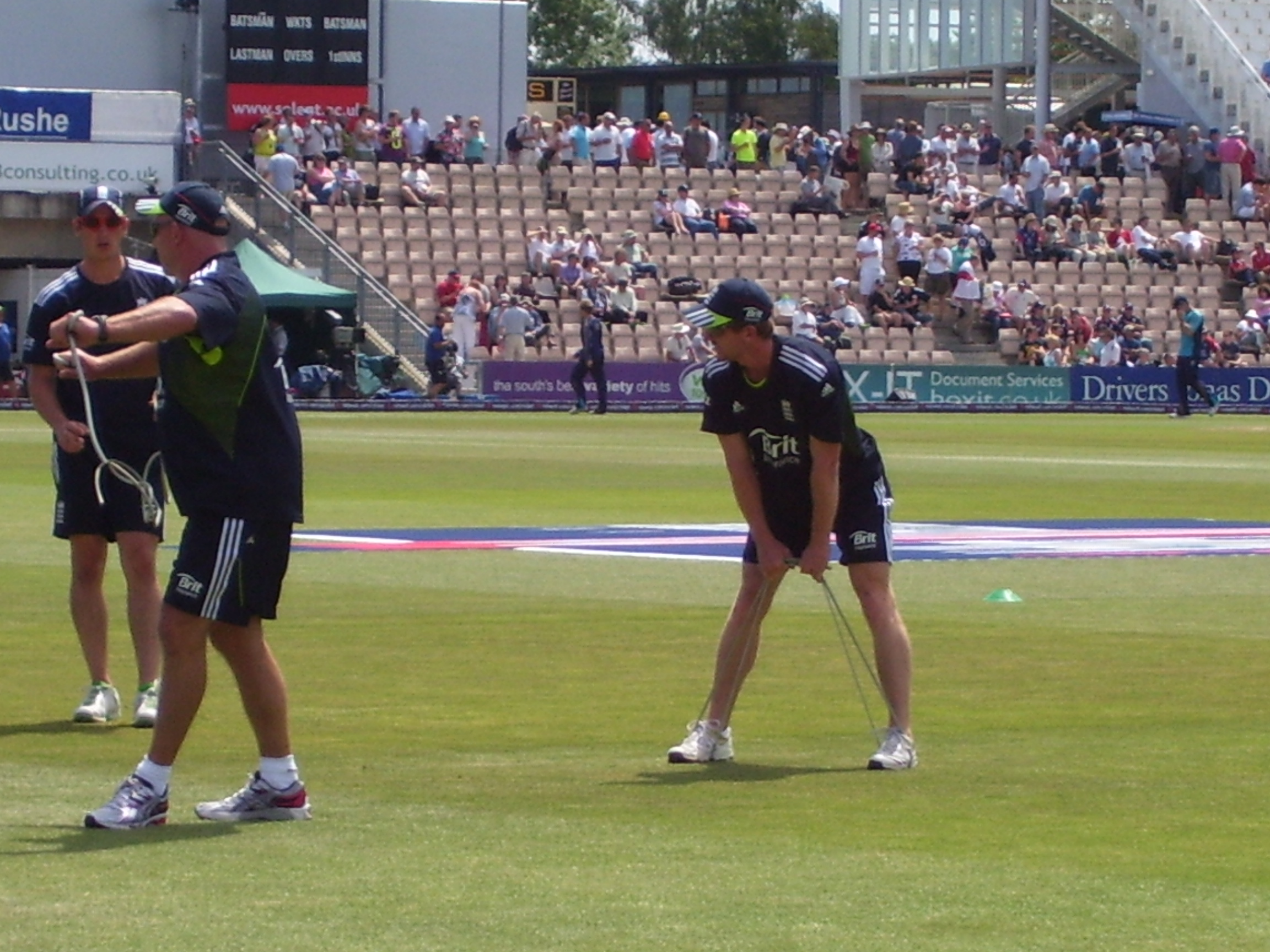
Collingwood warming up before Englands ODI against Australia at the Rose Bowl on 22 June 2010.

After Lord's, however, his form tailed away considerably: tormented by Australia's seam-bowling attack, his scores for the rest of the series were 13, 0 and 4, and 24 and 1, bringing his batting average for the five-match series down to 27.78. Collingwood's difficulties with the bat seemed to affect his usually high-class catching, and he dropped three chances of varying degrees of difficulty on the final day of the series at the Oval, though he did take a sharp catch to dismiss Mitchell Johnson for a duck off Steve Harmison as part of England's surge to a 197-run victory in the match, and a 2–1 victory in the series.

Against South Africa in November 2009, Collingwood surpassed Alec Stewart's record of 170 ODIs to become England's most capped player. He held the record until May 2019, when Eoin Morgan surpassed Collingwood during England's series against Pakistan.

=== Late career and retirement ===
In early 2010, Collingwood led the England Twenty20 team to the 2010 World Twenty20 championship. Collingwood appeared in all seven games, struggling with the bat as he scored only 61 runs at 10.16; with the ball, he only bowled one over for ten runs, although his prowess in the field continued – his four catches being the joint-highest with the wicket-keeper, Craig Kieswetter, for the England team. It was Collingwood's captaincy that was most praised, as he led England to their first-ever ICC trophy, hitting the winning runs in their seven-wicket victory over Australia in the final.

Collingwood was then rested for the home Test series against Bangladesh, but returned for the five-match ODI series against Australia in June. During the second match, he overtook Alec Stewart's record to become England's all-time leading runscorer in the format. Following poor batting performances in the 2010–11 Ashes series, he announced his retirement from Test cricket.

For his performances in 2010, he was named in the World ODI XI by the ICC.

In July 2014, he played for the Rest of the World side in the Bicentenary Celebration match at Lord's. In August 2017, he was named in a World XI side to play three Twenty20 International matches against Pakistan in the 2017 Independence Cup in Lahore. In the 3-match series, Collingwood only played a single match.

== Coaching career ==
After retiring from international cricket, Collingwood associated with England and Scotland cricket teams as coach and supporting staff. In November 2014, Collingwood agreed to return in Scotland's coaching staff for the 2015 Cricket World Cup. He then became the captain/assistant coach of Durham, which led them to win the 2013 LV County Championship, the inaugural 2014 Royal London One-Day Cup.

Collingwood was named as Limited Overs Consultant for England in September 2015. He was appointed fielding coach for the England cricket team. On 7 February 2022, it was announced that Collingwood would serve as interim head coach of the men's England cricket team for the forthcoming West Indies Test series.

== Honours ==
He was chosen as one of the five Wisden Cricketers of the Year in 2007, alongside England teammate Monty Panesar. In its rationale, Wisden describes him as having become the embodiment of "the sort of cricketer who not only made the most of his ability but was also determined to keep getting better".

== Achievements ==
=== Test matches ===
- 1,000+ Test runs in a calendar year in 2006.
- England fourth-wicket partnership record against Australia – 206 in a partnership of 310 with Kevin Pietersen in 2006.
- Double century against Australia in 2007 – only the third English batsman to score a double century in Australia, and the first since Wally Hammond in 1936.
- First Durham player to score a Test century for England, and first to hit one at Riverside Ground.

=== One-Day Internationals ===
- Best bowling figures in an ODI by an England player – 6/31 against Bangladesh in 2005.
- Best ODI all-round performance – 6/31 and 112* against Bangladesh in 2005.

=== Twenty20 Internationals ===
- First English cricket captain to lead a major ICC tournament-winning side.

== Career performance ==
=== Test career against opponents ===
		Batting				Bowling			
Opposition	Matches	Runs	Average	High score	100 / 50	Runs	Wickets	Average	Best (Inns)
Australia	16	783	30.11	206	1 / 4	186	3	62.00	1/3
Bangladesh	2	148	49.33	145	1 / 0	8	0	–	–
India	8	597	45.92	134*	2 / 2	139	4	34.75	2/24
New Zealand	6	276	30.66	66	0 / 3	147	5	29.40	3/23
Pakistan	10	632	39.50	186	1 / 3	180	1	180.00	1/33
South Africa	7	576	57.60	135	1 / 4	118	0	–	–
Sri Lanka	8	390	27.85	57	0 / 2	116	3	38.66	2/25
West Indies	11	857	61.21	161	4 / 2	124	1	124.00	1/34
Overall	68	4259	40.56	206	10 / 20	1018	17	59.88	3/23

=== ODI career against opponents ===
		Batting				Bowling			
Opposition	Matches	Runs	Average	High Score	100 / 50	Runs	Wickets	Average	Best
Australia	27	690	36.31	120*	1 / 4	464	11	42.18	4/34
Bangladesh	7	234	234.00	112*	1 / 0	102	6	17.00	6/31
Canada	1	62	–	62*	0 / 1	41	0	–	0/41
India	33	865	37.60	93	0 / 6	711	11	64.63	2/45
Ireland	3	109	36.33	90	0 / 1	86	4	21.50	2/26
Kenya	1	18	–	18*	0 / 0	33	2	16.50	2/33
Namibia	1	38	38.00	38	0 / 0	–	–	–	–
Netherlands	1	5	–	5*	0 / 0	–	–	–	–
New Zealand	22	579	30.47	106	1 / 3	624	24	26.00	4/15
Pakistan	13	315	31.50	66*	0 / 2	266	5	53.20	2/23
South Africa	14	318	39.75	105*	1 / 1	388	6	64.66	2/24
Sri Lanka	19	538	29.88	100	1 / 1	431	12	35.91	2/29
West Indies	21	357	23.80	69	0 / 1	387	11	35.18	3/16
Zimbabwe	8	262	52.40	80*	0 / 3	233	7	33.28	3/16
Overall	171	4390	35.98	120*	5 / 23	3766	99	38.04	6/31

=== T20I career against opponents ===
		Batting				Bowling			
Opposition	Matches	Runs	Average	High Score	100 / 50	Runs	Wickets	Average	Best
Australia	3	69	23.00	46	0 / 0	60	3	20.00	2/8
India	1	28	28.00	28	0 / 0	13	0	n/a	0/13
New Zealand	3	83	27.66	54	0 / 1	45	2	22.5	1/15
Pakistan	1	2	2.00	2	0 / 0	19	0	n/a	0/19
Sri Lanka	1	5	5.00	5	0 / 0	22	4	5.50	4/22
West Indies	2	106	53.00	79	0 / 1	38	2	19.00	2/21
Zimbabwe	1	37	37.00	37	0 / 0	23	1	23.00	1/23
Overall	13	330	25.38	79	0 / 2	220	12	18.33	4/22
