= NatWest Series =

One-day cricket tournament in England

The NatWest Series is the name used for One Day International cricket tournaments held in England since 2000. The tournaments are sponsored by the National Westminster Bank.

== 2000 to 2005: triangular series ==
The original format of the NatWest Series was a three-team triangular tournament, involving England and two visiting international sides. Each of the three teams would play the other two three times each, after which the two top teams would face each other in a final at Lord's in London. The ten matches would be played at the seven international grounds (Lord's, Edgbaston, Headingley, Old Trafford, The Oval, Trent Bridge and the Riverside Ground), as well as other county cricket grounds such as the St Lawrence Ground (Canterbury), Sophia Gardens (Cardiff), the Rose Bowl (Southampton) and at Bristol.

The first NatWest Series was held in 2000 a year after England hosted the World Cup. The West Indies and Zimbabwe were the two visiting teams, with England and Zimbabwe contesting the first final. England won by 6 wickets, with Darren Gough taking 3–20 and Alec Stewart scoring 97.

It used to be a common occurrence at the end of cricket Test matches for the crowd to invade the pitch to watch the presentation from the pavilion balcony. In the UK this tradition ended in 2001 Natwest Series after a steward was injured in a pitch invasion at a one-day match between England and Pakistan. Invading the pitch can now warrant a £1,000 fine, and post-match presentations are held on the field. During the presentation ceremony at the 2001 NatWest Series final on the balcony at Lord's, Michael Bevan was hit in the face with a beer can thrown from the crowd.

Other notable matches in the series included the 2002 final, where England faced India. England posted a total of 325–5 with Nasser Hussain scoring 115, his only one day century, and Marcus Trescothick also scoring 109, but were beaten by India who made 326–8 thanks to Mohammad Kaif scoring 87 and Yuvraj Singh 69.

In 2005, Bangladesh secured an unexpected victory over Australia in Cardiff, with Mohammad Ashraful scoring a century. Also, that year's final between Australia and England was a tie, with both sides scoring 196 and sharing the trophy.

By the time of the last triangular tournament in 2005, every test-playing nation had participated in at least one NatWest Series.

=== Tournaments by year ===
Season	Winner	Runner-up	Third place
2000	England	Zimbabwe	West Indies
2001	Australia	Pakistan	England
2002	India	England	Sri Lanka
2003	England	South Africa	Zimbabwe
2004	New Zealand	West Indies	England
2005	Australia; England (shared)		Bangladesh

== NatWest Challenge ==
For three seasons, from 2003 to 2005, three extra One Day Internationals were arranged for the England team in addition to the NatWest Series.

In 2003, Pakistan came to England for the three match series. In 2004, India played the NatWest Challenge as a prelude to the ICC Champions Trophy held in England that year. The following year, Australia played these matches between the NatWest Series and The Ashes. The ICC began their trial of the "Supersub", 12th man who could bat or bowl and "Powerplay", flexible fielding restrictions in the 2005 matches. The Supersub idea was jettisoned after a year whilst the Powerplay experiment was retained.

=== NatWest Challenge results ===
Season	Matches	Winner	Runner-up	Result
2003	3	England	Pakistan	2–1
2004	3	England	India	2–1
2005	3	Australia	England	2–1

== 2006 to date ==
The triangular format was abandoned in 2006, when England reverted to playing separate series against each visiting team (as they had in the Texaco Trophy from 1984 until 1998), but the name NatWest Series was retained. This was attributed to the poor crowds at matches not involving the home team. The NatWest Series includes one or two matches in the Twenty20 cricket format against the touring team. The home team now plays 10 One Day Internationals a season.

In 2006, England played five matches against each of Sri Lanka and Pakistan, losing 5–0 to Sri Lanka and drawing 2–2 with Pakistan.

In 2007, the visiting teams were the West Indies and India: England lost the three-match series against the West Indies 2–1, and defeated India 4–3 in the seven-match series.

=== 2008 Series ===
In June 2008, England lost the five-match series against New Zealand 3–1 with one match rained off. During a close match 4 at The Oval that NZ won, Grant Elliott was controversially run out after a mid-pitch collision with Ryan Sidebottom.

In August/September 2008, England beat South Africa 4–0 in the five match series with the final match rained off. Led by new captain Kevin Pietersen, a revitalised England beat an "end of tour" South Africa. In match 2 in Nottingham, SA were bowled out for 83 and England won the day/night match before the floodlights were required.

In the Twenty20 matches, England beat New Zealand in the only match in Manchester in June however the match against South Africa at Chester-le-Street was abandoned without a ball being bowled.

=== 2009 Series ===
In May 2009, England led by Andrew Strauss beat the West Indies 2–0 with one match rained off. England won both matches, by 58 runs at Birmingham and by 6 wickets, Bristol, respectively. There were no Twenty20 internationals scheduled due to the ICC World Twenty20 event in June.

In August/September England were scheduled to play two Twenty20 matches at Manchester versus Australia. The first match was abandoned during the England innings and the second match was abandoned without a ball being bowled.

A seven match series was contested in September 2009 versus Australia after the home team's Ashes series win. The Australians won the first six, at The Oval, two at Lords, Southampton and two at Nottingham, and England won the final match at the Chester-le-Street. The top run scorer in the series was Andrew Strauss, 267 runs for England, who also scored most in the Ashes Test match series. Top wicket taker was Brett Lee, 12 wickets for Australia, who did not appear in the summer's Test series.

=== 2010 Series ===
During the 2010 summer there were three NatWest Series. In June 2010, England played a five match tour series versus Australia, who were in the country to play a Test series Pakistan. England beat the Australians 3–2 winning the first three matches with Eoin Morgan scoring the most runs, 238 runs and Stuart Broad taking 12 wickets on either side.

In July, England beat Bangladesh 2–1 in a three match series. The series was notable as Bangladesh beat England for the very first time in one-day cricket.

In September, England played Pakistan in two Twenty20 matches (not part of the NatWest Series) and a five match one-day match series. This series was played with the backdrop of spot fixing allegations made against Pakistani players during the Test match series against England. England won the two Twenty20 matches at Cardiff.

England then went on to win the one-day series 3–2. England lost the 3rd match at The Oval by 23 runs. The ICC launched an investigation into the match after receiving information that there were scoring irregularities during the England innings. Ijaz Butt the Pakistan Cricket Board chairman suggested that as "a conspiracy" to defraud Pakistan cricket. Butt went on to accuse England players of bad practice, allegations he later withdrew. Andrew Strauss scored the most runs, 317 runs and Umar Gul took most wickets, 12, during the series.

=== 2011 Series ===
In June and July 2011, England won the five match series 3–2 versus Sri Lanka. England won the close deciding 5th match at Old Trafford by 16 runs. The 2nd match at The Oval was notable as Sri Lankan batsman Sanath Jayasuriya played his 445th and final one-day international. England's captain Alastair Cook scored the most runs in the series (298). Sri Lankan Spinner Suraj Randiv and England fast bowler James Anderson were joint highest wicket takers, (9). Sri Lanka won the Nat West Twenty20 International by 9 wickets at Bristol.

In September, England won a five match series versus India 3–0 with one tied match and one no result. The 4th match at Lords ended in a tie under the Duckworth-Lewis method. The 5th match at Cardiff, was Rahul Dravid's 344th and final one-day international. He also played his first and last Twenty20 International at Old Trafford. England won that match, at the end of August, by 6 wickets. In the one day series, Indian captain MS Dhoni scored the most runs, (236) and English spinner Graeme Swann took the most wickets (8). India went through the whole tour of England without a win in an international match, after also losing the Test series 4–0.

England played two more Twenty20 Internationals at The Oval versus the West Indies to close the season. The series ended 1–1.

=== NatWest Series results since 2006 ===
Season	One Day Internationals				Twenty20 Internationals			
Season	Matches	Winner	Runner-up	Result	Matches	Winner	Runner-up	Result
2006	5	Sri Lanka	England	5–0	1	Sri Lanka	England	1–0
2006	5	England; Pakistan (shared)		2–2*	1	Pakistan	England	1–0
2007	3	West Indies	England	2–1	2	England; West Indies (shared)		1–1
2007	7	England	India	4–3	(No Twenty20 Series played)			
2008	5	New Zealand	England	3–1*	1	England	New Zealand	1–0
2008	5	England	South Africa	4–0*	1	(Match abandoned)		
2009	3	England	West Indies	2–0*	(No Twenty20 Series played)			
2009	7	Australia	England	6–1	2	(Both matches abandoned)		
2010	5	England	Australia	3–2*	(No Twenty20 Series played)			
2010	3	England	Bangladesh	2–1	(No Twenty20 Series played)			
2010	5	England	Pakistan	3–2	2	England	Pakistan	2–0
2011	5	England	Sri Lanka	3–2	1	Sri Lanka	England	1–0
2011	5	England	India	3–0 + Tie *	1	England	India	1–0
2012	3	England	West Indies	2–0*	1	England	West Indies	1–0

'* One match no result

== See also ==
- 2004 NatWest Challenge
