= Indian cricket team in England in 2004 =

	India	England
- Dates: 1 September – 5 September 2004
Captains	Sourav Ganguly	Michael Vaughan

One Day International series
- Results: England won the 3-match series 2–1
Most runs	Sourav Ganguly (121)	Andrew Flintoff (133)
Most wickets	Harbhajan Singh (5)	Steve Harmison (7); Darren Gough (7)
- Player of the series: Steve Harmison (Eng)

The India national cricket team toured England in 2004 for a three-match series of One Day Internationals in preparation for the 2004 ICC Champions Trophy. England won the series 2–1, winning the first two matches before India won the final match at Lord's.

== Squads ==
England	India
Michael Vaughan (c); Kabir Ali; James Anderson; Gareth Batty; Paul Collingwood; Andrew Flintoff; Ashley Giles; Darren Gough; Stephen Harmison; Geraint Jones (wk); Anthony McGrath; Vikram Solanki; Andrew Strauss; Marcus Trescothick	Sourav Ganguly (c); Virender Sehwag; Sachin Tendulkar; Rahul Dravid (wk); VVS Laxman; Yuvraj Singh; Mohammad Kaif; Ajit Agarkar; Dinesh Karthik (wk); Anil Kumble; Harbhajan Singh; Lakshmipathy Balaji; Ashish Nehra; Irfan Pathan; Rohan Gavaskar

== ODI series ==
=== 1st ODI ===
1 September 2004
Scorecard

India; 170 (43.5 overs)	v	England; 171/3 (32.2 overs)
Mohammad Kaif 50 (79); Alex Wharf 3/30 (8 overs)		Vikram Solanki 52 (75); Lakshmipathy Balaji 2/37 (10 overs)

England won by 7 wickets
Trent Bridge, Nottingham
Umpires: Darrell Hair (Aus) and David Shepherd (Eng)
Player of the match: Alex Wharf (Eng)

- England won the toss and elected to field.
- Alex Wharf (Eng) made his ODI debut.
- Steve Harmison (Eng) claimed his first hat-trick in ODIs, picking the final three wickets of India's innings.

=== 2nd ODI ===
3 September 2004
Scorecard

England; 307/5 (50 overs)	v	India; 237 (46.3 overs)
Andrew Flintoff 99 (93); Harbhajan Singh 2/14 (10 overs)		Mohammad Kaif 51 (73); Darren Gough 4/50 (10 overs)

England won by 70 runs
The Oval, London
Umpires: Mark Benson (Eng) and Darrell Hair (Aus)
Player of the match: Andrew Flintoff (Eng)

- India won the toss and elected to field.
- Andrew Flintoff and Paul Collingwood broke the record for highest partnership for the fifth wicket for England in ODIs, before it was bettered by Eoin Morgan and Ravi Bopara in 2013.
- Harbhajan Singh and Lakshmipathy Balaji broke the record for highest tenth wicket partnership for India in ODIs (64).

=== 3rd ODI ===
5 September 2004
Scorecard

India; 204 (49.3 overs)	v	England; 181 (48.2 overs)
Sourav Ganguly 90 (119); Steve Harmison 4/22 (10 overs)		Michael Vaughan 74 (141); Ashish Nehra 3/26 (7.2 overs)

India won by 23 runs
Lord's, London
Umpires: Darrell Hair (Aus) and Jeremy Lloyds (Eng)
Player of the match: Sourav Ganguly (Ind)

- India won the toss and elected to bat.
- Dinesh Karthik (Ind) made his ODI debut.
- Darren Gough (Eng) claimed his 200th wicket in ODIs.
