= Benedict Bermange =

British cricket statistician

Benedict Bermange (born 19 March 1975) is a British sports statistician and writer. He is best known for his work as a cricket statistician on Sky Sports.

== Early life and education ==
Bermange was educated at Haberdashers' Boys' School. He studied at Durham University, where he was a member of Hatfield College and captained its cricket team, which included Andrew Strauss. While still a student, Bermange established the first online cricket ratings website in 1994.

== Career ==
Bermange initially worked as an accountant and ran the website for PricewaterhouseCoopers. During the 1999 Cricket World Cup, he began working as an additional scorer for television coverage, using annual leave from his regular employment to attend matches. He returned for the 2003 Cricket World Cup and joined Sky Sports full-time in 2006, when the broadcaster acquired the rights to televise England's home Test matches.

As Sky's cricket statistician, Bermange provides statistical information for commentators and identifies records and milestones during matches. He has also written regularly for the Sky Sports website, providing statistical analysis of international cricket. He has additionally worked as a statistician on the broadcaster's NFL coverage.

== Selected works ==
- Bermange, Benedict (2020). Picking the Perfect Cricket Team. White Owl. ISBN 9781526769701.
- ——— (2022). The Greatest of their Time. White Owl. ISBN 9781399008860.
