= Riverside Ground =

Cricket ground

- Chester-le-Street

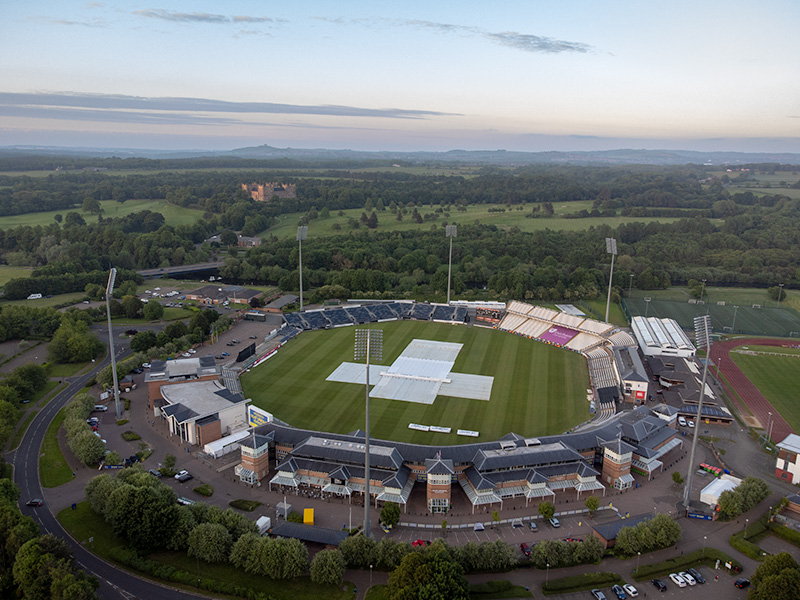
- Interactive map of Riverside Ground

Ground information
- Location: Chester-le-Street, County Durham
- Country: England
- Coordinates: 54°50′59″N 1°33′39″W
- Establishment: 1995
- Capacity: 5000 (domestic); 17,000 (internationals)
- End names
- Lumley End Finchale End

International information
- First men's Test: 5–7 June 2003: England v Zimbabwe
- Last men's Test: 27–30 May 2016: England v Sri Lanka
- First men's ODI: 20 May 1999: Pakistan v Scotland
- Last men's ODI: 22 September 2026: England v Sri Lanka
- First men's T20I: 8 September 2012: England v South Africa
- Last men's T20I: 1 July 2026: England v India
- First women's ODI: 18 June 1996: England v New Zealand
- Last women's ODI: 10 May 2026: England v New Zealand
- First women's T20I: 8 September 2012: England v West Indies
- Last women's T20I: 10 September 2022: England v India

Team information
Durham	(1995 – present)
- As of 24 September 2024; Source: Cricinfo

The Riverside Ground, known for sponsorship reasons as the Banks Homes Riverside, is a cricket venue in Chester-le-Street, County Durham, England. It is home to Durham County Cricket Club, and has also hosted several international matches.

== History ==
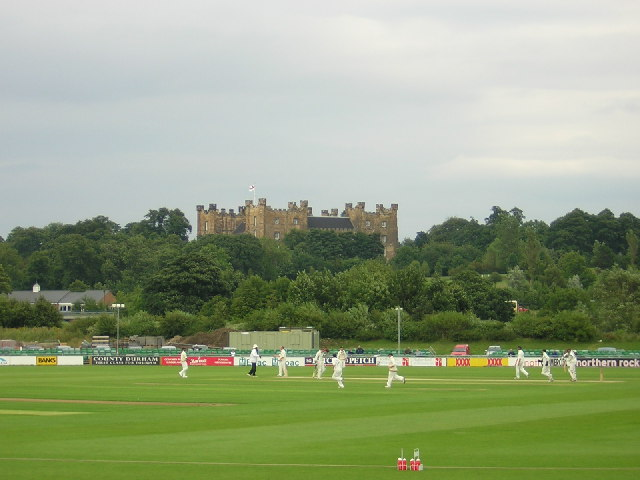
View to the north-east of the ground towards Lumley Castle. Additional seating on this side of the ground is now permanently erected, where previously for international matches, capacity was increased with temporary seating.

Durham's acceptance into first-class cricket in 1991 was made conditional on the building of a new Test match-standard cricket ground. Work began on the new ground at the Riverside in a location overlooked by Lumley Castle in 1990, with development continuing in phases. Work on the outfield and playing surface began in 1993. In its first three seasons in the County Championship, the Club played in a variety of locations around the county, but the Riverside ground was pronounced ready for cricket in time for the 1995 season, even though many of the buildings were still temporary or unfinished. The ground hosted its first game, Durham vs. Warwickshire, on 18 May 1995.

Other facilities at the ground continued being built over subsequent years, and the club's Don Robson Pavilion was opened by Queen Elizabeth II in 1996. The full ground capacity, including permanent and temporary seating, is 17,000.

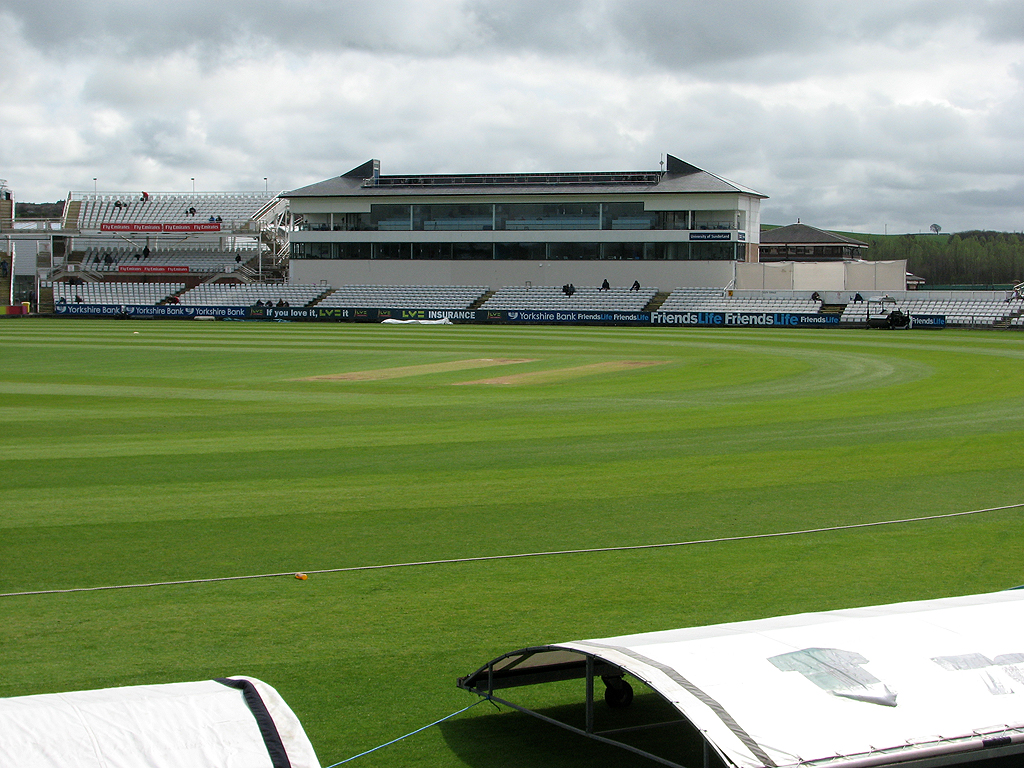
Media Centre and South Terrace

In September 2008 plans were announced concerning further developments to the ground. These included installing permanent floodlights, and extending the County Durham stand so that permanent seating surrounds the entire ground, raising the ground capacity to around 20,000. A new entrance building was also planned to house the box office and club shop, as well as offices for club officials, a new perimeter road and a hotel. These developments were seen as a necessity, as the England and Wales Cricket Board (ECB) have specified that they must take place in order for the ground to secure its status as a venue for the 2019 Cricket World Cup.

In April 2015, planning permission was granted to erect six permanent 55-metre floodlights around the ground. Within weeks, the lights were in action as Durham Jets hosted the Yorkshire Vikings in a T20 Blast match.

On 16 September 2017, during the Riverside Ground's hosting of England's Twenty20 International match against the West Indies, a stand in the North-East Terrace partially collapsed. Three spectators were injured, and part of the stand was evacuated.

Irish pop vocal band Westlife were due to perform at the stadium on 18 July 2020 for their "Stadiums in the Summer Tour" but the concert was cancelled due to the COVID-19 pandemic.

== International matches ==
The development of the Riverside into a significant cricketing venue was underscored in 1999, when it hosted two World Cup matches involving Pakistan, Scotland, Australia and Bangladesh, and then in 2000 when it staged two One-Day International matches in a triangular series between England, Zimbabwe and the West Indies. In 2001 a One-Day International between Australia and Pakistan was abandoned without a ball bowled due to rain.

2003 saw the Riverside Ground raised to Test match status; it has hosted six England Test matches: against Zimbabwe in 2003, Bangladesh in 2005, West Indies in 2007 and 2009, Australia in 2013 and Sri Lanka in 2016. The fourth day of the West Indies Test, 18 June 2007, saw Paul Collingwood hitting a century on his home pitch for England against the West Indies, and so becoming the first local Durham player to hit a Test century at the Riverside.

It was announced in July 2009 that the ground would host the fourth Ashes Test match of the 2013 Ashes series, the culmination of Durham's growth as a First Class County since 1992 coming after Durham missed out to Cardiff in its bid to host an Ashes test in 2009. Hosting an Ashes Test match was predicted to generate £20 million for the local economy.

The first scheduled Twenty20 International at the ground, against South Africa in 2008, was abandoned due to heavy rain. In 2012 South Africa returned for the Riverside Ground's second Twenty20 match, defeating England by 7 wickets, in a match held alongside a women's T20I against the West Indies. A second T20I double header was hosted in August 2013, where England defeated Australia in both men's and women's matches. The women's match formed the final encounter of the 2013 women's Ashes series. Further Twenty20 matches were held against West Indies in 2017 and New Zealand in 2023.

ODI matches held included against India in 2002, New Zealand in 2004, Pakistan in 2010, Australia and South Africa in 2013. Further international matches held at the Riverside Ground included two ODI matches, against Sri Lanka in 2014 and New Zealand in 2015, and a Test match against Sri Lanka held in 2016.

As part of the conditions of a package of financial support announced in October 2016, the ECB imposed a number of sanctions on Durham County Cricket Club, including removal of the club's eligibility to bid to stage Test cricket at the Riverside Ground. The club will still be eligible to bid to host one-day and Twenty20 international matches, with a Twenty20 international against the West Indies scheduled to be held in 2017. It hosted three matches at the 2019 Cricket World Cup. Riverside Ground is the northernmost cricket ground in the world which has hosted a test match. Additional England ODI matches include against Australia in 2018, Sri Lanka in 2021, South Africa in 2022, Australia in 2024 and the West Indies in 2025.

== Sponsorship ==
On 4 June 2010 it was announced that the stadium would be renamed the 'Emirates Durham International Cricket Ground' for sponsorship reasons. In February 2016 it was again renamed, this time to 'Emirates Riverside', following the extension of Emirates' contract with the county until 2022. The ground reverted to The Riverside Cricket Ground at the end of 2021 season due to the impact of COVID-19 on the airline.

== See also ==
- List of cricket grounds in England and Wales
- List of Test cricket grounds
