= Pakistani cricket team in England in 2003 =

	Pakistan	England
- Dates: 17 June – 22 June 2003
Captains	Rashid Latif	Michael Vaughan

One Day International series
- Results: England won the 3-match series 2–1
Most runs	Mohammad Hafeez (102)	Marcus Trescothick (212)
Most wickets	Mohammad Hafeez (4); Shoaib Malik (4)	James Anderson (8)
- Player of the series: Marcus Trescothick (ENG)

The Pakistan national cricket team toured England in 2003 for a three-match series of One Day Internationals, which was named the 2003 NatWest Challenge. England won the series 2–1, winning the final two matches after Pakistan won the first match at Old Trafford.

== Squads ==
England	Pakistan
Michael Vaughan (c); Kabir Ali; James Anderson; Rikki Clarke; Andrew Flintoff; Ashley Giles; Darren Gough; Steve Harmison; ~~Richard Johnson~~; Rob Key; Anthony McGrath; Chris Read (wk); Vikram Solanki; Marcus Trescothick; Jim Troughton	Rashid Latif (c and wk); Mohammad Yousuf; Mohammad Hafeez; Imran Nazir; ~~Faisal Athar~~; Yasir Hameed; Younis Khan; Misbah-ul-Haq; Shoaib Malik; Bilal Asad; Azhar Mahmood; Shoaib Akhtar; Mohammad Sami; Shabbir Ahmed; Umar Gul; Danish Kaneria

Richard Johnson withdrew from the England squad on 13 June and was replaced by James Kirtley. Faisal Athar withdrew from the Pakistan squad on 14 June and was replaced by Abdul Razzaq.

== ODI series ==
=== 1st ODI ===
17 June 2003 (D/N)
Scorecard

England; 204/9 (50 overs)	v	Pakistan; 208/8 (49.2 overs)
A Flintoff 39 (55); Shoaib Malik 3/26 (10 overs)		Mohammad Hafeez 69 (112); James Anderson 3/59 (10 overs)

Pakistan won by 2 wickets
Old Trafford, Manchester
Umpires: DB Hair (AUS) and DR Shepherd (ENG)
Player of the match: Mohammad Hafeez (PAK)

- England won the toss and elected to bat.
- R Clarke, A McGrath, and JO Troughton (all ENG) made their ODI debuts.

=== 2nd ODI ===
20 June 2003
Scorecard

Pakistan; 185 (44 overs)	v	England; 189/3 (22 overs)
Mohammad Yousuf 75* (102); James Anderson 4/27 (9 overs)		ME Trescothick 86 (55); Shoaib Akhtar 2/69 (9 overs)

England won by 7 wickets
The Oval, London
Umpires: DB Hair (AUS) and NA Mallender (ENG)
Player of the match: ME Trescothick (ENG)

- Pakistan won the toss and elected to bat.
- James Anderson became the first England bowler to claim a hat-trick in ODIs.

=== 3rd ODI ===
22 June 2003
Scorecard

Pakistan; 229/7 (50 overs)	v	England; 231/6 (48.3 overs)
Abdul Razzaq 64 (53); A Flintoff 4/32 (10 overs)		ME Trescothick 108* (145); Mohammad Hafeez 3/31 (9 overs)

England won by 4 wickets
Lord's, London
Umpires: DB Hair (AUS) and P Willey (ENG)
Player of the match: ME Trescothick (ENG)

- England won the toss and elected to field.
