= Sri Lankan cricket team in England in 2002 =

Sri Lanka in England in 2002
	Sri Lanka	England
- Dates: 26 April – 11 July 2002
Captains	Sanath Jayasuriya	Nasser Hussain

Test series
- Result: England won the 3-match series 2–0
Most runs	Marvan Atapattu (277)	Marcus Trescothick (354)
Most wickets	Muttiah Muralitharan (8)	Matthew Hoggard (14)
- Player of the series: Mark Butcher (Eng); Mahela Jayawardene (SL)

The Sri Lanka cricket team toured England in the 2002 season to play a three-match Test series against England, followed by a triangular One Day International tournament that also featured India. Sri Lanka finished in third place in the ODI tournament, while England won the Test series 2–0 with one match drawn.

== Tour matches ==
=== First-class: Kent vs Sri Lankans ===
26–28 April 2002
Scorecard

Sri Lankans	v	Kent
375 (90.3 overs); Mahela Jayawardene 119 (134); James Golding 4/76 (22 overs)		419/6d (63.3 overs); David Fulton 116 (117); Ruchira Perera 3/45 (12 overs)

Match drawn
St Lawrence Ground, Canterbury
Umpires: Mervyn Kitchen (Eng) and Peter Willey (Eng)

- Sri Lankans won the toss and elected to bat
- No play was possible on Day 1 due to rain.

=== List A: Sir Paul Getty's XI vs Sri Lankans ===
30 April 2002
Scorecard

Sri Lankans	v	Sir Paul Getty's XI

Match abandoned without a ball bowled
Sir Paul Getty's Ground, Wormsley
Umpires: Dickie Bird (Eng) and John Holder (Eng)

- No toss.
- No play was possible due to rain.

=== First-class: British Universities vs Sri Lankans ===
2–4 May 2002
Scorecard

Sri Lankans	v	British Universities
383/8d (94 overs); Marvan Atapattu 100 (180); Mark Tournier 5/88 (28 overs)		216 (58.3 overs); Jamie Dalrymple 40 (66); Ishara Amerasingh 3/46 (12 overs)
128/1d (24 overs); Sanath Jayasuriya 52 (55); Mark Tournier 1/37 (6 overs)

Match drawn
County Ground, Northampton
Umpires: Trevor Jesty (Eng) and Richard Kettleborough (Eng)

- British Universities won the toss and elected to field

=== First-class: Durham vs Sri Lankans ===
7–9 May 2002
Scorecard

Durham	v	Sri Lankans
469 (93.2 overs); Paul Collingwood 190 (212); Chaminda Vaas 3/79 (22 overs)		167 (48.5 overs); Aravinda de Silva 53 (85); Marc Symington 4/27 (12 overs)
		282/4 (f/o) (60 overs); Russel Arnold 112 (134); Graeme Bridge 2/40 (12 overs)

Match drawn
Riverside Ground, Chester-le-Street
Umpires: John Holder (Eng) and Tim Robinson (Eng)

- Durham won the toss and elected to bat

=== First-class: Middlesex vs Sri Lankans ===
11–13 May 2002
Scorecard

Sri Lankans	v	Middlesex
186 (50.4 overs); Sanath Jayasuriya 52 (62); Ben Hutton 4/37 (16 overs)		274 (74 overs); Ed Joyce 93 (126); Charitha Buddhika 4/72 (18 overs)
281/4 (66 overs); Mahela Jayawardene 125* (161); Tim Bloomfield 3/45 (17 overs)

Match drawn
Denis Compton Oval, Shenley
Umpires: Graham Burgess (Eng) and Peter Hartley (Eng)

- Sri Lankans won the toss and elected to bat
- Play abandoned at lunch on Day 3.

=== First-class: Glamorgan vs Sri Lankans ===
23–26 May 2002
Scorecard

Sri Lankans	v	Glamorgan
337/7 (99 overs); Kumar Sangakkara 113 (152); Alex Wharf 4/71 (25 overs)

Match drawn
Sophia Gardens, Cardiff
Umpires: Michael Dixon (Eng) and Jeremy Lloyds (Eng)

- Glamorgan won the toss and elected to field
- No play was possible on Day 1, 2, or 3 due to rain.

=== First-class: Marylebone Cricket Club vs Sri Lankans ===
6–8 June 2002
Scorecard

Marylebone Cricket Club	v	Sri Lankans
326/7d (86 overs); Usman Afzaal 111 (174); Ruchira Perera 4/66 (20 overs)		127 (35.3 overs); Aravinda de Silva 54 (49); Kevin Dean 3/29 (12 overs)
93/0d (17 overs); David Fulton 47* (55)

Match drawn
Queen's Park, Chesterfield
Umpires: Alan Hill (Eng) and Alan Whitehead (Eng)

- Marylebone Cricket Club won the toss and elected to bat

=== List A: West Indies A vs Sri Lankans ===
19 June 2002
Scorecard

West Indies A 77 (26.1 overs)	v	Sri Lanka; 82/3 (13 overs)
Runako Morton 20 (60); Charitha Buddhika 4/30 (9 overs)		Kumar Sangakkara 35 (37); Jermaine Lawson 1/4 (3 overs)

Sri Lankans won by 7 wickets (with 222 balls remaining)
County Ground, Hove
Umpires: Vanburn Holder (WI) and George Sharp (Eng)

- West Indies A won the toss and elected to bat

=== List A: Somerset vs Sri Lankans ===
21 June 2002
Scorecard

Somerset; 241 (48 overs)	v	Sri Lankans; 178 (42 overs)
Mike Burns 63 (61); Nuwan Zoysa 4/49 (10 overs)		Naveed Nawaz 61 (94); Keith Dutch 4/30 (10 overs)

Somerset won by 63 runs
County Ground, Taunton
Umpires: Tim Robinson (Eng) and David Shepherd (Eng)

- Somerset won the toss and elected to bat

=== List A: Gloucestershire v Sri Lankans ===
23 June 2002
Scorecard

Sri Lankans; 275/8 (50 overs)	v	Gloucestershire; 182 (36.1 overs)
Russel Arnold 80 (86); Ian Harvey 4/35 (7 overs)		Craig Spearman 76 (66); Nuwan Zoysa 3/43 (7.1 overs)

Sri Lankans won by 93 runs
County Ground, Bristol
Umpires: Jeremy Lloyds (Eng) and Neil Mallender (Eng)

- Sri Lankans won the toss and elected to bat

=== List A: Northamptonshire v Sri Lankans ===
24 June 2002
Scorecard

Northamptonshire; 246/5 (50 overs)	v	Sri Lankans; 249/2 (43.1 overs)
Mal Loye 123 (151); Charitha Buddhika 2/36 (10 overs)		Romesh Kaluwitharana 140* (135); Darren Cousins 1/31 (8 overs)

Sri Lankans won by 8 wickets with 41 balls remaining
County Ground, Northampton
Umpires: Barry Dudleston (Eng) and Kevin Lyons (Eng)

- Northamptonshire won the toss and elected to bat

== Test series ==
=== 1st Test ===
16–20 May 2002
Scorecard

Sri Lanka	v	England
555/8d (169 overs); Marvan Atapattu 185 (351); Dominic Cork 3/93 (35.3 overs)		275 (73.1 overs); Michael Vaughan 64 (148); Ruchira Perera 3/48 (11 overs)
42/1 (13 overs); Mahela Jayawardene 14 (21); Andy Caddick 1/10 (7 overs)		529/5d (f/o) (191 overs); Michael Vaughan 115 (219); Ruchira Perera 2/90 (30 overs)

Match drawn
Lord's, London
Umpires: Daryl Harper (Aus) and Srinivas Venkataraghavan (Ind)
Player of the match: Marvan Atapattu

- Sri Lanka won the toss and elected to bat

=== 2nd Test ===
30 May – 2 June 2002
Scorecard

Sri Lanka	v	England
162 (52.5 overs); Mahela Jayawardene 47 (60); Andy Caddick 3/47 (17 overs)		545 (163.5 overs); Marcus Trescothick 161 (232); Muttiah Muralitharan 5/143 (64 overs)
272 (89.1 overs); Mahela Jayawardene 59 (158); Matthew Hoggard 5/92 (23 overs)

England won by an innings and 111 runs
Edgbaston, Birmingham
Umpires: Daryl Harper (Aus) and Srinivas Venkataraghavan (Ind)
Player of the match: Matthew Hoggard

- England won the toss and elected to field

=== 3rd Test ===
13–17 June 2002
Scorecard

England	v	Sri Lanka
512 (145.2 overs); Alec Stewart 123 (190); Muttiah Muralitharan 3/137 (60 overs)		253 (92.3 overs); Russel Arnold 62 (77); Alex Tudor 4/65 (25 overs)
50/0 (5 overs); Michael Vaughan 24 (17)		308 (f/o) (113.2 overs); Russel Arnold 109 (236); Ashley Giles 4/62 (24.2 overs)

England won by 10 wickets
Old Trafford, Manchester
Umpires: Steve Bucknor (WIN) and Dave Orchard (RSA)
Player of the match: Alex Tudor

- England won the toss and elected to bat
- Start of Day 2 delayed until 2pm due to rain

== NatWest Series (ODI) ==
=== 1st Match: England v Sri Lanka ===
27 June 2002 (D/N)
Scorecard

England; 293/6 (50 overs)	v	Sri Lanka; 249/9 (45.2 overs)
Alec Stewart 83 (103); Dilhara Fernando 2/46 (8 overs)		Romesh Kaluwitharana 52 (64); Andrew Flintoff 3/49 (10 overs)

England won by 44 runs
Trent Bridge, Nottingham
Umpires: Dave Orchard (SA) and David Shepherd (Eng)
Player of the match: Andrew Flintoff (Eng)

- England won the toss and elected to bat.
- Points: England 4, Sri Lanka 0.

=== 3rd Match: India v Sri Lanka ===
30 June 2002
Scorecard

Sri Lanka; 202/8 (50 overs)	v	India; 203/6 (45.2 overs)
Mahela Jayawardene 62 (105); Ajit Agarkar 3/44 (9 overs)		Sachin Tendulkar 49 (70); Chaminda Vaas 2/38 (10 overs)

India won by 4 wickets
The Oval, London
Umpires: Dave Orchard (SA) and Peter Willey (Eng)
Player of the match: Ajit Agarkar (Ind)

- Sri Lanka won the toss and elected to bat.
- Points: India 4, Sri Lanka 0.

=== 4th Match: England v Sri Lanka ===
2 July 2002
Scorecard

Sri Lanka; 240/7 (32 overs)	v	England; 241/7 (31.2 overs)
Sanath Jayasuriya 112 (87); Darren Gough 3/45 (7 overs)		Marcus Trescothick 82 (60); Dilhara Fernando 2/38 (6 overs)

England won by 3 wickets
Headingley, Leeds
Umpires: Steve Bucknor (SA) and Neil Mallender (Eng)
Player of the match: Sanath Jayasuriya (SL)

- England won the toss and elected to field.
- Match restricted to 32 overs due to rain.
- Points: England 4, Sri Lanka 0.

=== 6th Match: India v Sri Lanka ===
6 July 2002
Scorecard

Sri Lanka; 187 (48.2 overs)	v	India; 188/6 (48.1 overs)
Marvan Atapattu 50 (73); Ashish Nehra 2/28 (10 overs)		Rahul Dravid 64 (95); Dilhara Fernando 2/22 (10 overs)

India won by 4 wickets
Edgbaston, Birmingham
Umpires: Steve Bucknor (WI) and Neil Mallender (Eng)
Player of the match: Rahul Dravid (Ind)

- India won the toss and elected to field.
- Points: India 4, Sri Lanka 0.

=== 7th Match: England v Sri Lanka ===
7 July 2002
Scorecard

Sri Lanka; 229 (49.4 overs)	v	England; 206 (47.4 overs)
Kumar Sangakkara 70 (79); Michael Vaughan 4/22 (6 overs)		Nick Knight 29 (34); Sanath Jayasuriya 3/38 (9 overs)

Sri Lanka won by 23 runs
Old Trafford, Manchester
Umpires: Dave Orchard (SA) and Peter Willey (Eng)
Player of the match: Kumar Sangakkara (SL)

- Sri Lanka won the toss and elected to bat.
- Points: Sri Lanka 4, England 0.

=== 9th Match: India v Sri Lanka ===
11 July 2002 (D/N)
Scorecard

India; 304 (50 overs)	v	Sri Lanka; 241 (44.1 overs)
Sachin Tendulkar 113 (102); Thilan Samaraweera 2/39 (8 overs)		Kumar Sangakkara 66 (47); Harbhajan Singh 4/46 (10 overs)

India won by 63 runs
County Ground, Bristol
Umpires: Dave Orchard (SA) and David Shepherd (Eng)
Player of the match: Sachin Tendulkar (Ind)

- India won the toss and elected to bat.
- Points: India 5, Sri Lanka 0.

== External sources ==
- CricketArchive
- CricInfo
