= Indian cricket team in England in 2002 =

Cricket series on england soil

	India	England
- Dates: 22 June – 9 September 2002
Captains	Sourav Ganguly	Nasser Hussain

Test series
- Result: 4-match series drawn 1–1
Most runs	Rahul Dravid (602)	Michael Vaughan (615)
Most wickets	Anil Kumble (14)	Matthew Hoggard (14)
- Player of the series: Rahul Dravid (Ind) and Michael Vaughan (Eng)

The India national cricket team toured England from 22 June to 9 September 2002. The tour comprised a four-match Test series, preceded by a triangular One Day International tournament that also featured Sri Lanka. India won the ODI tournament, beating England in the final, while the Test series was drawn 1–1.

== Squads ==
England		India	
Tests	ODIs	Tests	ODIs
Nasser Hussain (c); Mark Butcher; Andy Caddick; Dominic Cork; John Crawley; Andrew Flintoff; Darren Gough; Ashley Giles; Steve Harmison; Matthew Hoggard; Ronnie Irani; Simon Jones; Rob Key; Alec Stewart (wk); Graham Thorpe; Marcus Trescothick; Alex Tudor; Michael Vaughan; Craig White		Sourav Ganguly (c); Virender Sehwag; Rahul Dravid; Sachin Tendulkar; Dinesh Mongia; Yuvraj Singh; Mohammad Kaif; VVS Laxman; Ajay Ratra (wk); Harbhajan Singh; Ashish Nehra; Anil Kumble; Zaheer Khan; Tinu Yohannan; Ajit Agarkar	Sourav Ganguly (c); Shiv Sunder Das; Wasim Jaffer; Rahul Dravid; Sachin Tendulkar; VVS Laxman; Virender Sehwag; Harbhajan Singh; Ajay Ratra (wk); Parthiv Patel (wk); Anil Kumble; Zaheer Khan; Ashish Nehra; Ajit Agarkar; Tinu Yohannan; Sanjay Bangar

== Tour matches ==
=== 50-over: Sussex v Indians ===
22 June 2002
Scorecard

Sussex; 203/8 (50 overs)	v	Indians; 205/7 (48.5 overs)
Murray Goodwin 49 (69); Ashish Nehra 4/27 (10 overs)		Sachin Tendulkar 75* (82); Kevin Innes 3/35 (10 overs)

India won by 3 wickets
County Ground, Hove
Umpires: Tony Clarkson (Eng) and Richard Kettleborough (Eng)

- Sussex won the toss and elected to bat.

=== 50-over: Kent v Indians ===
24 June 2002
Scorecard

Kent; 284 (50 overs)	v	Indians; 263 (48.5 overs)
Rob Key 76 (84); Zaheer Khan 4/38 (8 overs)		Sourav Ganguly 64 (75); James Golding 4/42 (9 overs)

Kent won by 21 runs
St Lawrence Ground, Canterbury
Umpires: Tony Clarkson (Eng) and Alan Hill (Eng)

- Kent won the toss and elected to bat.

=== 50-over: Leicestershire v Indians ===
26 June 2002
Scorecard

Indians; 315/7 (50 overs)	v	Leicestershire; 261/7 (50 overs)
Virender Sehwag 98 (85); Jamie Grove 2/58 (10 overs)		Trevor Ward 95 (110); Yuvraj Singh 3/48 (10 overs)

Indians won by 54 runs
Grace Road, Leicester
Umpires: Alan Hill (Eng) and Barrie Leadbeater (Eng)

- Indians won the toss and elected to bat.

=== First-class: Indians v West Indies A ===
16–18 July 2002
Scorecard

Indians	v	(Cricket West Indies) West Indies A
253/7d (89.5 overs); Dinesh Mongia 87 (139); Chris Gayle 2/30 (12 overs)		266 (59.4 overs); Devon Smith 69 (93); Ajit Agarkar 4/55 (16 overs)
255 (77.4 overs); Mohammad Kaif 77 (126); Jermaine Lawson 6/76 (22.4 overs)		81/4 (26 overs); Devon Smith 19 (52); Sanjay Bangar 1/11 (7 overs)

Match drawn
Arundel Castle Cricket Ground, Arundel
Umpires: Nigel Llong (Eng) and Neil Mallender (Eng)

- Indians won the toss and elected to bat.

=== First-class: Hampshire v Indians ===
20–22 July 2002
Scorecard

Indians	v	Hampshire
236 (81.1 overs); Rahul Dravid 78 (119); Shaun Udal 5/59 (29 overs)		123 (37.3 overs); Neil Johnson 45 (49); Sanjay Bangar 4/40 (10 overs)
139/4d (41.2 overs); Sanjay Bangar 52* (100); James Hamblin 2/44 (7 overs)		186 (46.2 overs); Shaun Udal 36* (42); Anil Kumble 4/58 (17.2 overs)

Indians won by 66 runs
Rose Bowl, Southampton
Umpires: Nigel Cowley (Eng) and Peter Willey (Eng)

- Indians won the toss and elected to bat.

=== First-class: Worcestershire v Indians ===
31 July–3 August 2002
Scorecard

Indians	v	Worcestershire
417/8d (105 overs); Sachin Tendulkar 169 (246); Alamgir Sheriyar 4/109 (25 overs)		200/6 (54 overs); Stephen Peters 50 (90); Sourav Ganguly 2/21 (5 overs)

Match drawn
New Road, Worcester
Umpires: Richard Kettleborough (Eng) and George Sharp (Eng)

- Indians won the toss and elected to bat.
- No play was possible on Days 1 and 2 due to rain.

=== First-class: Essex v Indians ===
14–17 August 2002
Scorecard

Indians	v	Essex
516 (129.4 overs); Shiv Sunder Das 250 (380); James Middlebrook 4/164 (36 overs)		279 (75.4 overs); Darren Robinson 59 (79); Harbhajan Singh 7/83 (32 overs)
327/6d (88 overs); Virender Sehwag 142 (156); Mark Ilott 4/67 (17 overs)		186/3 (56 overs); Richard Clinton 53 (104); Virender Sehwag 2/52 (18 overs)

Match drawn
County Ground, Essex
Umpires: Paul Adams (Eng) and David Constant (Eng)

- Indians won the toss and elected to bat.

=== First-class: Derbyshire v Indians ===
28–30 August 2002
Scorecard

Indians	v	Derbyshire
445/8d (121.1 overs); Ajay Ratra 101* (207); Jason Kerr 3/97 (25 overs)		358 (100.5 overs); Rawait Khan 91 (200); Ashish Nehra 4/85 (23 overs)
182/3d (43.3 overs); Virender Sehwag 104 (97); Mathew Dowman 1/11 (3 overs)

Match drawn
County Ground, Derby
Umpires: Allan Jones (Eng) and Ken Shuttleworth (Eng)

- Indians won the toss and elected to Walk away.

== NatWest Series (ODI) ==
=== 2nd Match: England v India ===
29 June 2002
Scorecard

England; 271/7 (50 overs)	v	India; 272/4 (48.5 overs)
Marcus Trescothick 86 (78); Yuvraj Singh 3/39 (7 overs)		Rahul Dravid 73 (86); Ashley Giles 3/39 (10 overs)

India won by 6 wickets
Lord's, London
Umpires: Steve Bucknor (WI) and Neil Mallender (Eng)
Player of the match: Yuvraj Singh (Ind)

- England won the toss and elected to bat.
- Points: India 4, England 0.

=== 3rd Match: India v Sri Lanka ===
30 June 2002
Scorecard

Sri Lanka; 202/8 (50 overs)	v	India; 203/6 (45.2 overs)
Mahela Jayawardene 62 (105); Ajit Agarkar 3/44 (9 overs)		Sachin Tendulkar 49 (70); Chaminda Vaas 2/38 (10 overs)

India won by 4 wickets
The Oval, London
Umpires: Dave Orchard (SA) and Peter Willey (Eng)
Player of the match: Ajit Agarkar (Ind)

- Sri Lanka won the toss and elected to bat.
- Points: India 4, Sri Lanka 0.

=== 5th Match: England v India ===
4 July 2002 (D/N)
Scorecard

India; 285/4 (50 overs)	v	England; 53/1 (12.3 overs)
Sachin Tendulkar 105* (108); Darren Gough 2/52 (10 overs)		Marcus Trescothick 23 (26); Zaheer Khan 1/31 (6 overs)

No result
Riverside Ground, Chester-le-Street
Umpires: Dave Orchard (SA) and David Shepherd (Eng)

- India won the toss and elected to bat.
- Rain stopped play after 12.3 overs of the England innings.
- Points: England 2, India 2.

=== 6th Match: India v Sri Lanka ===
6 July 2002
Scorecard

Sri Lanka; 187 (48.2 overs)	v	India; 188/6 (48.1 overs)
Marvan Atapattu 50 (73); Ashish Nehra 2/28 (10 overs)		Rahul Dravid 64 (95); Dilhara Fernando 2/22 (10 overs)

India won by 4 wickets
Edgbaston, Birmingham
Umpires: Steve Bucknor (WI) and Neil Mallender (Eng)
Player of the match: Rahul Dravid (Ind)

- India won the toss and elected to field.
- Points: India 4, Sri Lanka 0.

=== 8th Match: England v India ===
9 July 2002
Scorecard

England; 229/8 (32 overs)	v	India; 165 (29.1 overs)
Ronnie Irani 53 (55); Zaheer Khan 3/53 (7 overs)		Virender Sehwag 46 (41); Ronnie Irani 5/26 (7 overs)

England won by 64 runs
The Oval, London
Umpires: Steve Bucknor (WI) and Peter Willey (Eng)
Player of the match: Ronnie Irani (Eng)

- India won the toss and elected to field.
- Play reduced to 32 overs per side due to rain.
- Points: England 5, India 0.

=== 9th Match: India v Sri Lanka ===
11 July 2002 (D/N)
Scorecard

India; 304 (50 overs)	v	Sri Lanka; 241 (44.1 overs)
Sachin Tendulkar 113 (102); Thilan Samaraweera 2/39 (8 overs)		Kumar Sangakkara 66 (47); Harbhajan Singh 4/46 (10 overs)

India won by 63 runs
County Ground, Bristol
Umpires: Dave Orchard (SA) and David Shepherd (Eng)
Player of the match: Sachin Tendulkar (Ind)

- India won the toss and elected to bat.
- Points: India 5, Sri Lanka 0.

=== Final: England v India ===
13 July 2002
Scorecard

England; 325/5 (50 overs)	v	India; 326/8 (49.3 overs)
Nasser Hussain 115 (128); Zaheer Khan 3/62 (10 overs)		Mohammad Kaif 87* (75); Ashley Giles 2/47 (10 overs)

India won by 2 wickets
Lord's, London
Umpires: Steve Bucknor (WI) and David Shepherd (Eng)
Player of the match: Mohammad Kaif (Ind)

- England won the toss and elected to bat.
- Nasser Hussain (Eng) scored his first hundred in an ODI.

== Test series ==
=== 1st Test ===
25–29 July 2002
Scorecard

England	v	India
487 (142.2 overs); Nasser Hussain 155 (331); Zaheer Khan 3/90 (36 overs)		221 (81.5 overs); Virender Sehwag 84 (96); Matthew Hoggard 3/33 (16.5 overs)
301/6d (64.4 overs); John Crawley 100* (132); Anil Kumble 3/84 (24 overs)		397 (109.4 overs); Ajit Agarkar 109* (190); Matthew Hoggard 4/87 (24 overs)

England won by 170 runs
Lord's, London
Umpires: Rudi Koertzen (SA) and Russell Tiffin (Zim)
Player of the match: Nasser Hussain (Eng)

- England won the toss and elected to bat.
- Simon Jones (Eng) made his Test debut.

=== 2nd Test ===
8–12 August 2002
Scorecard

India	v	England
357 (101.1 overs); Virender Sehwag 106 (183); Matthew Hoggard 4/105 (35.1 overs)		617 (144.5 overs); Michael Vaughan 197 (258); Zaheer Khan 3/110 (26 overs)
424/8d (115 overs); Rahul Dravid 115 (244); Dominic Cork 2/54 (12 overs)

Match drawn
Trent Bridge, Nottingham
Umpires: Rudi Koertzen (SA) and Russell Tiffin (Zim)
Player of the match: Michael Vaughan (Eng)

- India won the toss and elected to bat.
- Steve Harmison, Rob Key (both Eng) and Parthiv Patel (Ind) made their Test debuts.
- At 17 years and 153 days, Parthiv Patel became Test cricket's youngest wicket-keeper.

=== 3rd Test ===
22–26 August 2002
Scorecard

India	v	England
628/8d (180.1 overs); Sachin Tendulkar 193 (330); Andy Caddick 3/150 (40.1 overs)		273 (89 overs); Alec Stewart 78* (120); Harbhajan Singh 3/40 (18 overs)
		309 (f/o; 110.5 overs); Nasser Hussain 110 (194); Anil Kumble 4/66 (29.5 overs)

India won by an innings and 46 runs
Headingley, Leeds
Umpires: Asoka de Silva (SL) and Dave Orchard (SA)
Player of the match: Rahul Dravid (Ind)

- India won the toss and elected to bat.

=== 4th Test ===
5–9 September 2002
Scorecard

England	v	India
515 (155.4 overs); Michael Vaughan 195 (279); Harbhajan Singh 5/115 (38.4 overs)		508 (170 overs); Rahul Dravid 217 (468); Andy Caddick 4/114 (43 overs)
114/0 (28 overs); Marcus Trescothick 58* (98)

Match drawn
The Oval, London
Umpires: Asoka de Silva (SL) and Dave Orchard (SA)
Player of the match: Rahul Dravid (Ind)

- England won the toss and elected to bat.
- Last test of Dominic Cork
