= 2002 NatWest Series =

One Day International cricket tournament

- Part of Sri Lankan cricket team in England in 2002 and Indian cricket team in England in 2002
- Date: 27 June–13 July 2002
- Location: England
- Result: India beat England in the final
- Player of the series: Marcus Trescothick (ENG)
Teams
England	India	Sri Lanka
Captains
Nasser Hussain	Sourav Ganguly	Sanath Jayasuriya
Most runs
Marcus Trescothick (362)	Sachin Tendulkar (337)	Sanath Jayasuriya (210)
Most wickets
Andrew Flintoff (9)	Zaheer Khan (14)	Dilhara Fernando (10)

The 2002 NatWest Series was a One Day International cricket tri-series sponsored by the National Westminster Bank that took place in England between 27 June and 13 July 2002. The series involved the national teams of England, India and Sri Lanka. Ten matches were played in total, with each team playing one another thrice during the group stage. The teams which finished in the top two positions following the group stages qualified for the final, which India won by defeating England at Lord's on 13 July by 2 wickets. Preceding the series, England played Sri Lanka in a three Test series, while following the series, India played England in a four Test series.

== Venues ==
Nottingham	London	London	Leeds
Trent Bridge; Capacity: 15,000	Lord's; Capacity: 28,000	The Oval; Capacity: 23,500	Headingley; Capacity: 17,500
2002 NatWest Series is located in England
Chester-le-Street	Birmingham	Manchester	Bristol
Riverside Ground; Capacity: 19,000	Edgbaston; Capacity: 21,000	Old Trafford; Capacity: 15,000	County Ground; Capacity: 16,000

== Squads ==
England	India	Sri Lanka
Nasser Hussain (c); Paul Collingwood; Andrew Flintoff; Ashley Giles; Darren Gough; Matthew Hoggard; Ronnie Irani; James Kirtley; Nick Knight; Jeremy Snape; Alec Stewart (wk); Graham Thorpe; Marcus Trescothick; Alex Tudor; Michael Vaughan	Sourav Ganguly (c); Virender Sehwag; Rahul Dravid; Sachin Tendulkar; Dinesh Mongia; Yuvraj Singh; Mohammad Kaif; VVS Laxman; Ajay Ratra (wk); Harbhajan Singh; Ashish Nehra; Anil Kumble; Zaheer Khan; Tinu Yohannan; Ajit Agarkar	Sanath Jayasuriya (c); Marvan Atapattu; Thilan Samaraweera; Russel Arnold; Mahela Jayawardene; Kumar Sangakkara (wk); Romesh Kaluwitharana (wk); Nuwan Zoysa; Upul Chandana; Dilhara Fernando; Charitha Buddhika; Chaminda Vaas; Avishka Gunawardene; Pramodya Wickramasinghe; Chamara Silva; Naveed Nawaz

== Fixtures ==
Team	Pld	W	L	NR	BP	Pts	NRR
India	6	4	1	1	1	19	+0.175
England	6	3	2	1	1	15	+0.386
Sri Lanka	6	1	5	0	0	4	-0.441

27 June 2002 (D/N)
Scorecard

England; 293/6 (50 overs)	v	Sri Lanka; 249/9 (45.2 overs)
Alec Stewart 83 (103); Dilhara Fernando 2/46 (8 overs)		Romesh Kaluwitharana 52 (64); Andrew Flintoff 3/49 (10 overs)

England won by 44 runs
Trent Bridge, Nottingham
Umpires: Dave Orchard (SA) and David Shepherd (Eng)
Player of the match: Andrew Flintoff (Eng)

- England won the toss and elected to bat.
- Points: England 4, Sri Lanka 0.

29 June 2002
Scorecard

England; 271/7 (50 overs)	v	India; 272/4 (48.5 overs)
Marcus Trescothick 86 (78); Yuvraj Singh 3/39 (7 overs)		Rahul Dravid 73 (86); Ashley Giles 3/39 (10 overs)

India won by 6 wickets
Lord's, London
Umpires: Steve Bucknor (WI) and Neil Mallender (Eng)
Player of the match: Yuvraj Singh (Ind)

- England won the toss and elected to bat.
- Points: India 4, England 0.

30 June 2002
Scorecard

Sri Lanka; 202/8 (50 overs)	v	India; 203/6 (45.2 overs)
Mahela Jayawardene 62 (105); Ajit Agarkar 3/44 (9 overs)		Sachin Tendulkar 49 (70); Chaminda Vaas 2/38 (10 overs)

India won by 4 wickets
The Oval, London
Umpires: Dave Orchard (SA) and Peter Willey (Eng)
Player of the match: Ajit Agarkar (Ind)

- Sri Lanka won the toss and elected to bat.
- Points: India 4, Sri Lanka 0.

2 July 2002
Scorecard

Sri Lanka; 240/7 (32 overs)	v	England; 241/7 (31.2 overs)
Sanath Jayasuriya 112 (87); Darren Gough 3/45 (7 overs)		Marcus Trescothick 82 (60); Dilhara Fernando 2/38 (6 overs)

England won by 3 wickets
Headingley, Leeds
Umpires: Steve Bucknor (WI) and Neil Mallender (Eng)
Player of the match: Sanath Jayasuriya (SL)

- England won the toss and elected to field.
- Match restricted to 32 overs due to rain.
- Points: England 4, Sri Lanka 0.

4 July 2002 (D/N)
Scorecard

India; 285/4 (50 overs)	v	England; 53/1 (12.3 overs)
Sachin Tendulkar 105* (108); Darren Gough 2/52 (10 overs)		Marcus Trescothick 23 (26); Zaheer Khan 1/31 (6 overs)

No result
Riverside Ground, Chester-le-Street
Umpires: Dave Orchard (SA) and David Shepherd (Eng)

- India won the toss and elected to bat.
- Rain stopped play after 12.3 overs of the England innings.
- Points: England 2, India 2.

6 July 2002
Scorecard

Sri Lanka; 187 (48.2 overs)	v	India; 188/6 (48.1 overs)
Marvan Atapattu 50 (73); Ashish Nehra 2/28 (10 overs)		Rahul Dravid 64 (95); Dilhara Fernando 2/22 (10 overs)

India won by 4 wickets
Edgbaston, Birmingham
Umpires: Steve Bucknor (WI) and Neil Mallender (Eng)
Player of the match: Rahul Dravid (Ind)

- India won the toss and elected to field.
- Points: India 4, Sri Lanka 0.

7 July 2002
Scorecard

Sri Lanka; 229 (49.4 overs)	v	England; 206 (47.4 overs)
Kumar Sangakkara 70 (79); Michael Vaughan 4/22 (6 overs)		Nick Knight 29 (34); Sanath Jayasuriya 3/38 (9 overs)

Sri Lanka won by 23 runs
Old Trafford, Manchester
Umpires: Dave Orchard (SA) and Peter Willey (Eng)
Player of the match: Kumar Sangakkara (SL)

- Sri Lanka won the toss and elected to bat.
- Points: Sri Lanka 4, England 0.

9 July 2002
Scorecard

England; 229/8 (32 overs)	v	India; 165 (29.1 overs)
Ronnie Irani 53 (55); Zaheer Khan 3/53 (7 overs)		Virender Sehwag 46 (41); Ronnie Irani 5/26 (7 overs)

England won by 64 runs
The Oval, London
Umpires: Steve Bucknor (WI) and Peter Willey (Eng)
Player of the match: Ronnie Irani (Eng)

- India won the toss and elected to field.
- Play reduced to 32 overs per side due to rain.
- Points: England 5, India 0.

11 July 2002 (D/N)
Scorecard

India; 304 (50 overs)	v	Sri Lanka; 241 (44.1 overs)
Sachin Tendulkar 113 (102); Thilan Samaraweera 2/39 (8 overs)		Kumar Sangakkara 66 (47); Harbhajan Singh 4/46 (10 overs)

India won by 63 runs
County Ground, Bristol
Umpires: Dave Orchard (SA) and David Shepherd (Eng)
Player of the match: Sachin Tendulkar (Ind)

- India won the toss and elected to bat.
- Points: India 5, Sri Lanka 0.

=== Final ===
13 July 2002
Scorecard

England; 325/5 (50 overs)	v	India; 326/8 (49.3 overs)
Nasser Hussain 115 (128); Zaheer Khan 3/62 (10 overs)		Mohammad Kaif 87* (75); Ashley Giles 2/47 (10 overs)

India won by 2 wickets
Lord's, London
Umpires: Steve Bucknor (WI) and David Shepherd (Eng)
Player of the match: Mohammad Kaif (Ind)

- England won the toss and elected to bat.
- Nasser Hussain (Eng) scored his first hundred in an ODI.

== Statistics ==
Most runs		Most wickets	
(England) Marcus Trescothick	362	(India) Zaheer Khan	14
(India) Sachin Tendulkar	337	(Sri Lanka) Dilhara Fernando	10
(India) Yuvraj Singh	254	(Sri Lanka) Chaminda Vaas	9
(India) Rahul Dravid	245	(England) Andrew Flintoff	9
(England) Nasser Hussain	244	(England) Ronnie Irani	8
