= List of international cricket five-wicket hauls by Harbhajan Singh =

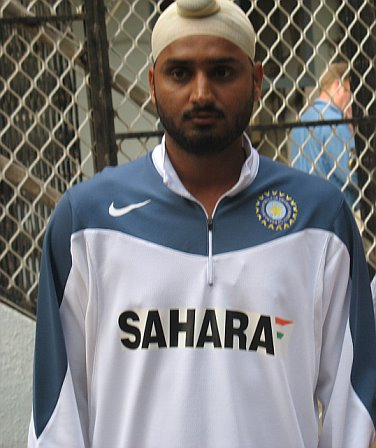
Harbhajan Singh has the third-highest number of Test wickets by an off spinner, behind Sri Lanka's Muttiah Muralitharan and India's Ravichandran Ashwin in test match cricket.

In cricket, a five-wicket haul (also known as a "fifer") refers to a bowler taking five or more wickets in a single innings. This is regarded as a notable achievement, and as of October 2024, only 54 bowlers have taken 15 or more five-wicket hauls at international level in their cricketing careers. A right-arm off break bowler, Harbhajan Singh has taken 417 wickets in Test, 269 wickets in One Day International (ODI) and 25 wickets in Twenty20 International (T20I) matches for India. He has the second-highest number of five-wicket hauls (28) in international cricket—next to Anil Kumble—among Indian cricketers and the eleventh among overall. (Note: He stands next to Muttiah Muralitharan (77), Richard Hadlee (41), Shane Warne (38), Anil Kumble (37), Glenn McGrath (36), Waqar Younis (35), Rangana Herath (35), Wasim Akram (31), Dale Steyn (29) and James Anderson (29).)

Harbhajan made his Test debut against Australia in 1998. His first five-wicket haul came against the same team during the second Test of the 2000–01 series at Eden Gardens. His six wickets for 73 runs in the second innings of the match raised his tally to thirteen wickets in the match; his performance was instrumental in India winning the match after being forced to follow-on. (Note: This was only the third occasion where a team had won after being forced to follow-on.) In the third Test of the series, he claimed fifteen wickets for 217 runs, including career-best figures of eight wickets for 84 runs. The majority of his five-wicket hauls in Test cricket—seven out of his twenty-five—have come against Australia.

Harbhajan's first five-wicket haul in ODIs came against England in 2002, four years after he made his debut. He took five wickets for 43 runs in the match which India lost. His best figures of five wickets for 31 runs came against the same team in 2006. Although Harbhajan made his first T20I appearance in 2006, he has yet to take a five-wicket haul in the format as of October 2019. His figures of four wickets for 12 runs against England in 2012 remain his best in T20Is.

== Key ==
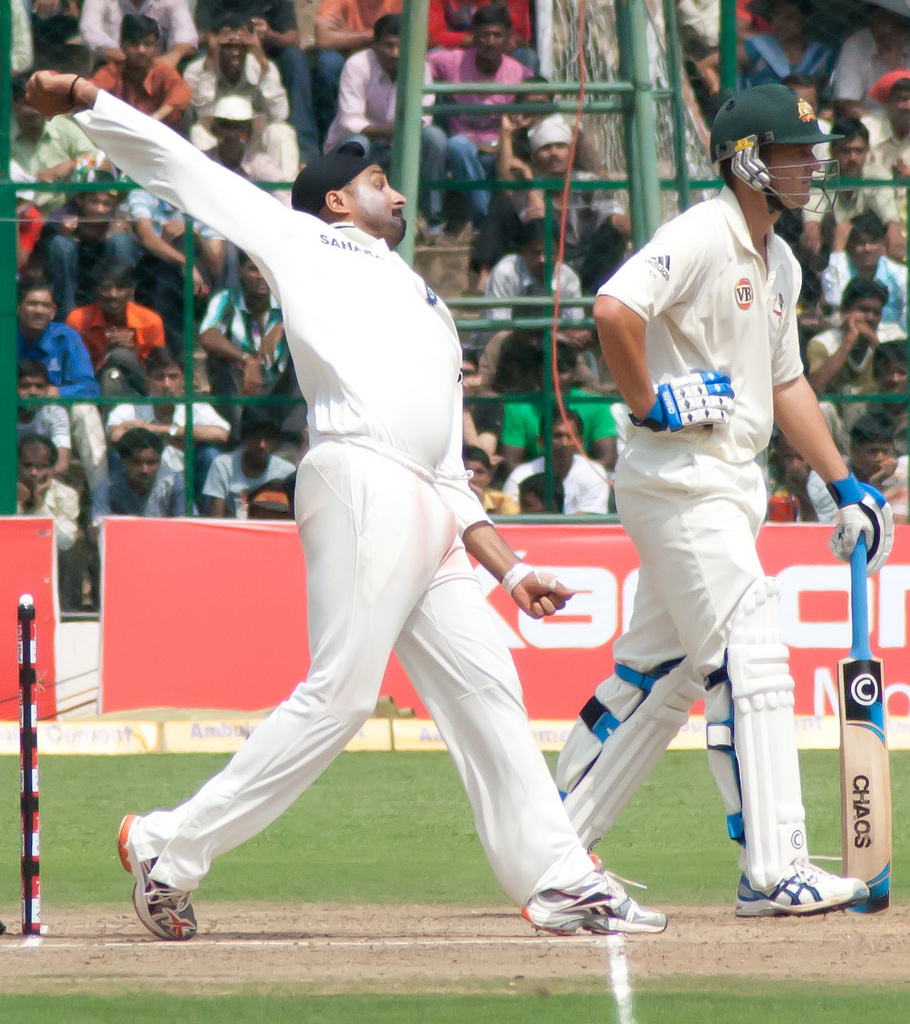
Harbhajan bowling against Australia during the 2010–11 Border–Gavaskar Trophy.

Symbol	Meaning
Date	Day the Test started or ODI held
Inn	Innings in which five-wicket haul was taken
Overs	Number of overs bowled
Runs	Number of runs conceded
Wkts	Number of wickets taken
Econ	Runs conceded per over
Batsmen	Batsmen whose wickets were taken
Result	Result for the India team
*	One of two five-wicket hauls by Harbhajan in the match
†	10 or more wickets taken in the match
‡	Harbhajan was selected as the man of the match

== Tests ==
Five-wicket hauls in Test cricket
No.	Date	Ground	Against	Inn	Overs	Runs	Wkts	Econ	Batsmen	Result
1	11 March 2001 * †	Eden Gardens, Kolkata	Australia	1	37.5	123	7	3.25	Matthew Hayden; Mark Waugh; Steve Waugh; Ricky Ponting; Adam Gilchrist; Shane Warne; Jason Gillespie	Won
2	11 March 2001 * †	Eden Gardens, Kolkata	Australia	4	30.3	73	6	2.39	Michael Slater; Justin Langer; Steve Waugh; Ricky Ponting; Jason Gillespie; Glenn McGrath	Won
3	18 March 2001 * † ‡	M. A. Chidambaram Stadium, Chennai	Australia	1	38.2	133	7	3.46	Matthew Hayden; Justin Langer; Ricky Ponting; Adam Gilchrist; Shane Warne; Jason Gillespie; Colin Miller	Won
4	18 March 2001 * † ‡	M. A. Chidambaram Stadium, Chennai	Australia	3	41.5	84	8	2.01	Michael Slater; Adam Gilchrist; Mark Waugh; Steve Waugh; Ricky Ponting; Shane Warne; Jason Gillespie; Colin Miller	Won
5	3 December 2001	Punjab Cricket Association Stadium, Mohali	England	1	19.3	51	5	2.61	Mark Ramprakash; Andrew Flintoff; James Foster; Richard Dawson; Matthew Hoggard	Won
6	11 December 2001	Sardar Patel Stadium, Ahmedabad	England	3	30.2	71	5	2.34	Mark Butcher; Nasser Hussain; Mark Ramprakash; Ashley Giles; Matthew Hoggard	Drawn
7	28 February 2002 ‡	Feroz Shah Kotla, Delhi	Zimbabwe	3	31	62	6	2.00	Stuart Carlisle; Trevor Gripper; Alistair Campbell; Andy Flower; Travis Friend; Ray Price	Won
8	18 May 2002	Sabina Park, Kingston	West Indies	1	38	138	5	3.63	Wavell Hinds; Ramnaresh Sarwan; Ridley Jacobs; Mervyn Dillon; Adam Sanford	Lost
9	5 September 2002	Kennington Oval, London	England	1	38.4	115	5	2.97	Mark Butcher; Alec Stewart; Dominic Cork; Alex Tudor; Matthew Hoggard	Drawn
10	9 October 2002	Wankhede Stadium, Mumbai	West Indies	3	28.3	48	7	1.68	Chris Gayle; Wavell Hinds; Carl Hooper; Mahendra Nagamootoo; Mervyn Dillon; Pedro Collins; Cameron Cuffy	Won
11	30 October 2002	Eden Gardens, Kolkata	West Indies	2	57.3	115	5	2.00	Wavell Hinds; Ramnaresh Sarwan; Mervyn Dillon; Marlon Samuels; Cameron Cuffy	Drawn
12	6 October 2004 * †	M. Chinnaswamy Stadium, Bangalore	Australia	1	41	146	5	3.56	Matthew Hayden; Adam Gilchrist; Shane Warne; Michael Kasprowicz; Glenn McGrath	Lost
13	6 October 2004 * †	M. Chinnaswamy Stadium, Bangalore	Australia	3	30.1	78	6	2.58	Damien Martyn; Darren Lehmann; Michael Clarke; Shane Warne; Jason Gillespie; Michael Kasprowicz	Lost
14	3 November 2004	Wankhede Stadium, Mumbai	Australia	4	10.5	29	5	2.67	Matthew Hayden; Simon Katich; Adam Gilchrist; Michael Kasprowicz; Glenn McGrath	Won
15	28 November 2004 ‡	Eden Gardens, Kolkata	South Africa	3	30	87	7	2.90	Graeme Smith; Andrew Hall; Jacques Rudolph; Jacques Kallis; Hashim Amla; Shaun Pollock; Justin Ontong	Won
16	24 March 2005	M. Chinnaswamy Stadium, Bangalore	Pakistan	1	51.5	152	6	2.93	Younis Khan; Mohammad Yousuf; Asim Kamal; Abdul Razzaq; Kamran Akmal; Danish Kaneria	Lost
17	18 December 2005 † ‡	Sardar Patel Stadium, Ahmedabad	Sri Lanka	2	22.2	62	7	2.77	Marvan Atapattu; Kumar Sangakkara; Mahela Jayawardene; Thilan Samaraweera; Tillakaratne Dilshan; Farveez Maharoof; Lasith Malinga	Won
18	18 December 2005	Warner Park, Basseterre	West Indies	1	44	147	5	3.34	Dwayne Bravo; Denesh Ramdin; Jerome Taylor; Pedro Collins; Corey Collymore	Drawn
19	30 June 2006	Sabina Park, Kingston	West Indies	2	4.3	13	5	2.88	Daren Ganga; Dwayne Bravo; Ramnaresh Sarwan; Denesh Ramdin; Pedro Collins	Won
20	30 November 2007	Eden Gardens, Kolkata	Pakistan	2	45.5	122	5	2.66	Salman Butt; Mohammad Yousuf; Kamran Akmal; Shoaib Akhtar; Danish Kaneria	Drawn
21	26 March 2008	M. A. Chidambaram Stadium, Chennai	South Africa	1	44.5	164	5	3.65	Neil McKenzie; Jacques Kallis; Morne Morkel; Paul Harris; Dale Steyn	Drawn
22	31 July 2008 †	Galle International Stadium, Galle	Sri Lanka	2	40.3	102	6	2.51	Malinda Warnapura; Kumar Sangakkara; Thilan Samaraweera; Tillakaratne Dilshan; Prasanna Jayawardene; Muttiah Muralitharan	Won
23	18 March 2009	Seddon Park, Hamilton	New Zealand	3	28	63	6	2.25	Martin Guptill; Daniel Flynn; Jesse Ryder; James Franklin; Daniel Vettori; Iain O'Brien	Won
24	14 February 2010	Eden Gardens, Kolkata	South Africa	3	48.3	59	5	1.21	Alviro Petersen; Ashwell Prince; JP Duminy; Dale Steyn; Morné Morkel	Won
25	2 January 2011	Newlands, Cape Town	South Africa	3	38	120	7	3.15	Graeme Smith; Alviro Petersen; Paul Harris; Hashim Amla; Dale Steyn; Morne Morkel; Lonwabo Tsotsobe	Drawn

== ODIs ==
Five-wicket hauls in ODI cricket
No.	Date	Ground	Against	Inn	Overs	Runs	Wkts	Econ	Batsmen	Result
1	3 February 2002	Wankhede Stadium, Mumbai	England	1	10	43	5	4.30	Marcus Trescothick; Graham Thorpe; Paul Collingwood; Ashley Giles; James Foster	Lost
2	28 March 2006 ‡	Feroz Shah Kotla, Delhi	England	2	10	31	5	3.10	Matt Prior; Andrew Flintoff; Paul Collingwood; Geraint Jones; Ian Blackwell	Won
3	14 September 2009	R. Premadasa Stadium, Colombo	Sri Lanka	2	9.4	56	5	5.79	Tillakaratne Dilshan; Mahela Jayawardene; Thilina Kandamby; Lasith Malinga; Ajantha Mendis	Won
