= New Zealand cricket team in England in 1999 =

New Zealand in England 1999
	New Zealand	England
- Dates: 21 June – 22 August 1999
Captains	Stephen Fleming	Nasser Hussain

Test series
- Result: New Zealand won the 4-match series 2–1
Most runs	Matt Horne (203)	Alec Stewart (215)
Most wickets	Chris Cairns (19)	Andy Caddick (20)
- Player of the series: Chris Cairns and Andy Caddick

The New Zealand cricket team toured England in the 1999 cricket season, playing 12 first-class matches including four Tests against England.

New Zealand won the Test series 2–1, with one match drawn. As a result, England fell to the bottom of the Wisden Test rankings.

== Overview ==
At Edgbaston, in a low scoring match, an England team without a coach (as David Lloyd has resigned after their exit from the World Cup) surprised themselves by beating New Zealand by 7 wickets. Trailing by 100 runs on first innings, New Zealand could only set England 208 to win the match collapsing to only 107 all out in their second innings. England lost one wicket late on day 2 but of significant importance is that the cloud cover which had prevailed for the previous two days (during which 21 wickets had fallen) had disappeared. New Zealand could manage only two more wickets as Hussain, Thorpe and fledgling all-rounder Alex Tudor took England to victory. Tudor made 99 not out including 21 fours.

Roger Twose admitted New Zealand were "bitterly disappointed" to lose the first test when interviewed by Channel 4 during the second test and their response was a resounding win at Lord's. New Zealand bowled England out for a paltry 186 on a good batting wicket and then ground out 358 at barely 3 runs per over. Leading by 172, England faced an uphill battle to even make New Zealand bat again. With no batsman able to score more than 45 (Andy Caddick at number 8 top scoring), England set New Zealand 60 to win - which they duly did by 9 wickets. Chris Cairns took 8 wickets in the match including the celebrated Chris Read ducking what ended up being a leg stump yorker as he lost sight of Cairns's slower ball.

In the third test at Old Trafford, the rain largely saved England as they could only face 68 overs in their 2nd innings. Alec Stewart made 83 not out to hold off defeat. Nathan Astle and Craig McMillan scored centuries in New Zealand's 496/9 declared.

The series was therefore 1-1 heading into the final match at the Oval. Another low scoring contest (something of a feature of this series) ensued. Leading by 80 runs on first innings, again New Zealand somewhat collapsed to 162 all out in their second innings, Cairns top scoring by some margin with 80 batting at number 8 including some huge sixes off Tufnell. England therefore needed only 246 to win the match and series but fell well short at 162 with nobody able to stay with Michael Atherton who made 64.

This series is probably most memorable for:

- the all-round exploits of Chris Cairns - fit and very much in form in a career that was dogged by injuries.
- the new-ball combination of Cairns and Nash.
- the emergence of Daniel Vettori as a world class spinner.
- the rather "rudderless" England team who were without a coach and seemed to lack any sort of motivation on the field - despite the arrival of new captain Nasser Hussain.

At the end of the series, England had dropped below Zimbabwe in the Wisden world rankings and in a moment of black humour England's fans were heard to sing "We've got the worst team in the world" to the tune of the hymn "He's got the whole world in his hands".

=== 1st Test ===
1–3 July 1999
Scorecard

New Zealand	v	England
226 (88.4 overs); Adam Parore 73 (140); Phil Tufnell 3/22 (17 overs)		126 (46.4 overs); Andy Caddick 33 (73); Dion Nash 3/17 (11 overs)
107 (37.1 overs); Simon Doull 46 (50); Andy Caddick 5/32 (14 overs)		211/3 (43.4 overs); Alex Tudor 99* (119); Geoff Allott 2/71 (15 overs)

England won by 7 wickets
Edgbaston Cricket Ground, Birmingham
Umpires: Steve Bucknor (WI) and Peter Willey (Eng)
Player of the match: Alex Tudor (Eng)

- New Zealand won the toss and elected to bat.
- Aftab Habib and Chris Read (both Eng) made their Test debuts.
- This was Nasser Hussain's first Test as England captain.
- Alex Tudor's unbeaten 99 was the highest individual score for an England nightwatchman surpassing Harold Larwood's 98 in 1933.

=== 2nd Test ===
22–25 July 1999
Scorecard

England	v	New Zealand
186 (61.1 overs); Nasser Hussain 61 (144); Chris Cairns 6/77 (21.1 overs)		358 (119.1 overs); Matt Horne 100 (224); Dean Headley 3/74 (27 overs)
229 (101.4 overs); Andy Caddick 45 (96); Geoff Allott 3/36 (16.4 overs)		60/1 (23 overs); Matthew Bell 26* (72); Andy Caddick 1/18 (10 overs)

New Zealand won by 9 wickets
Lord's Cricket Ground, London
Umpires: Mervyn Kitchen (Eng) and Rudi Koertzen (SA)
Player of the match: Matt Horne (NZ)

- England won the toss and elected to bat.
- Nasser Hussain did not bat in England's second innings due to a finger injury. Graham Thorpe acted as captain in Hussain's absence.
- Alec Stewart (Eng) passed 6,000 runs in Tests.
- This was New Zealand's first win at this venue in 13 attempts.

=== 3rd Test ===
5–9 August 1999
Scorecard

England	v	New Zealand
199 (109.1 overs); Mark Ramprakash 69* (227); Dion Nash 3/46 (31.1 overs)		496/9d (160 overs); Craig McMillan 107* (210); Peter Such 4/114 (41 overs)
181/2 (68 overs); Alec Stewart 83* (198); Dion Nash 1/26 (10 overs)

Match drawn
Old Trafford Cricket Ground, Manchester
Umpires: David Shepherd (Eng) and Russell Tiffin (Zim)
Player of the match: Craig McMillan (NZ)

- England won the toss and elected to bat.
- Graeme Hick (Eng) and Craig McMillan (NZ) passed 3,000 and 1,000 runs respectively in Tests.

=== 4th Test ===
19–22 August 1999
Scorecard

New Zealand	v	England
236 (102.1 overs); Stephen Fleming 66* (234); Phil Tufnell 3/39 (16 overs)		153 (80 overs); Nasser Hussain 40 (111); Chris Cairns 5/31 (19 overs)
162 (54 overs); Chris Cairns 80 (93); Andy Caddick 3/35 (17 overs)		162 (56.1 overs); Michael Atherton 64 (158); Dion Nash 4/39 (14 overs)

New Zealand won by 83 runs
The Oval, London
Umpires: George Sharp (Eng) and Srinivas Venkataraghavan (Ind)
Player of the match: Chris Cairns (NZ)

- England won the toss and elected to field.
- Darren Maddy and Ed Giddins (both Eng) made their Test debuts.
- Michael Atherton (Eng) scored his 50th score of more than 50 in Tests.

== Notes ==
- Playfair Cricket Annual 2000
- Wisden Cricketers' Almanack 2000
