= English cricket team in Australia in 1998–99 =

1998-1999 Test series, England versus Australia

1998–99 Ashes Series
- Date: 20 November 1998 – 6 January 1999
- Location: Australia
- Result: Australia won the five-Test series 3–1
- Player of the series: Steve Waugh (Aus)
Teams
- Australia: England
Captains
- Mark Taylor: Alec Stewart
Most runs
- Steve Waugh (498) Michael Slater (460) Justin Langer (436): Nasser Hussain (407); Mark Ramprakash (379); Alec Stewart (316)
Most wickets
- Stuart MacGill (27) Glenn McGrath (24) Damien Fleming (16): Darren Gough (21); Dean Headley (19); Alan Mullally (12)

The England cricket team toured Australia in 1998–99, playing a five-Test series for The Ashes and a number of tour matches against Australian domestic teams. They also played a tri-nation series which included Sri Lanka.

Australia won the Test series 3–1 and retained the Ashes, which were in their possession since 1989. The player of the series was Steve Waugh from Australia. Of the five matches, one was drawn, Australia won three and England won one. Australian captain Mark Taylor won all five coin tosses at the start of each Test.

== Test series ==
=== 1st Test ===
20–24 November 1998
Scorecard

Australia	v	England
485 (158 overs); Ian Healy 134 (229); Alan Mullally 5/105 (40 overs)		375 (128.2 overs); Mark Butcher 116 (236); Glenn McGrath 6/85 (34.2 overs)
237/3d (62 overs); Michael Slater 113 (139); Dominic Cork 1/18 (5 overs)		179/6 (68 overs); Nasser Hussain 47 (122); Stuart MacGill 3/51 (22 overs)

Match drawn
The Gabba, Brisbane
Umpires: K. T. Francis (SL) and Darrell Hair (Aus)
Player of the match: Glenn McGrath (Aus)

- Australia won the toss and elected to bat.
- Play on Day 1 reduced to 89 overs due to bad light.
- Play on Day 3 reduced to 75 overs due to bad light and thunderstorms.
- Play on Day 5 reduced to 61 overs due to thunderstorms.

=== 2nd Test ===
28–30 November 1998
Scorecard

England	v	Australia
112 (39 overs); Alec Stewart 38 (29); Damien Fleming 5/46 (14 overs)		240 (89.2 overs); Mark Taylor 61 (144); Alex Tudor 4/89 (20.2 overs)
191 (70.2 overs); Graeme Hick 68 (73); Jason Gillespie 5/88 (15.2 overs)		64/3 (23 overs); Mark Waugh 17 (37); Darren Gough 1/18 (9 overs)

Australia won by 7 wickets
WACA Ground, Perth
Umpires: Daryl Harper (Aus) and Srinivasaraghavan Venkataraghavan (Ind)
Player of the match: Damien Fleming (Aus)

- Australia won the toss and elected to field.
- Alex Tudor (Eng) made his Test debut.

=== 3rd Test ===
11–15 December 1998
Scorecard

Australia	v	England
391 (125.5 overs); Justin Langer 179 (350); Dean Headley 4/97 (23 overs)		227 (82.5 overs); Nasser Hussain 89* (204); Stuart MacGill 4/53 (28 overs)
278/5d (98 overs); Michael Slater 103 (191); Peter Such 2/66 (29 overs)		237 (89 overs); Alec Stewart 63* (122); Glenn McGrath 4/50 (17 overs)

Australia won by 205 runs
Adelaide Oval, Adelaide
Umpires: Steve Bucknor (WI) and Steve Davis (Aus)
Player of the match: Justin Langer (Aus)

- Australia won the toss and elected to bat.

=== 4th Test ===
26–29 December 1998
Scorecard

England	v	Australia
270 (76 overs); Alec Stewart 107 (160); Stuart MacGill 4/61 (19 overs)		340 (98.3 overs); Steve Waugh 122* (198); Darren Gough 5/96 (28 overs)
244 (80.2 overs); Graeme Hick 60 (82); Matthew Nicholson 3/56 (15 overs)		162 (46.4 overs); Mark Waugh 43 (81); Dean Headley 6/60 (17 overs)

England won by 12 runs
Melbourne Cricket Ground, Melbourne
Umpires: Steve Bucknor (WI) and Daryl Harper (Aus)
Player of the match: Dean Headley (Eng)

- Australia won the toss and elected to field.
- No play was possible on Day 1 due to rain.
- Matthew Nicholson (Aus) and Warren Hegg (Eng) made their Test debuts.

=== 5th Test ===
2–5 January 1999
Scorecard

Australia	v	England
322 (87.3 overs); Mark Waugh 121 (205); Dean Headley 4/62 (19.3 overs)		220 (80.1 overs); John Crawley 44 (75); Stuart MacGill 5/57 (20.1 overs)
184 (64.5 overs); Michael Slater 123 (189); Peter Such 5/81 (25.5 overs)		188 (66.1 overs); Nasser Hussain 53 (129); Stuart MacGill 7/50 (20.1 overs)

Australia won by 98 runs
Sydney Cricket Ground, Sydney, Australia
Umpires: Steve Dunne (NZ) and Darrell Hair (Aus)
Player of the match: Stuart MacGill (Aus)

- Australia won the toss and elected to bat.
- Darren Gough took a hat-trick in Australia's first innings. It was the first Ashes hat-trick by an Englishman in almost 100 years and the first hat-trick taken in Sydney in almost 107 years.
