= James Golding (cricketer) =

English cricketer

Personal information
- Full name: James Matthew Golding
- Born: 19 July 1977 (age 49); Canterbury, Kent
- Batting: Right-handed
- Bowling: Right-arm medium-fast

Domestic team information
- Years: Team
- 1998–2000: Kent Cricket Board
- 1999–2002: Kent
- 2005–2009: Wiltshire
- FC debut: 15 July 1999 Kent v New Zealanders
- Last FC: 19 July 2002 Kent v Surrey
- LA debut: 4 May 1999 Kent Cricket Board v Denmark
- Last LA: 3 May 2005 Wiltshire v Kent

Career statistics
Competition	First-class	List A
Matches	11	40
Runs scored	224	383
Batting average	24.88	19.15
100s/50s	0/0	0/0
Top score	32	47*
Balls bowled	1,162	1,544
Wickets	14	48
Bowling average	45.50	25.43
5 wickets in innings	0	0
10 wickets in match	0	0
Best bowling	4/76	4/42
Catches/stumpings	2/–	8/–
- Source: CricInfo, 11 October 2017

James Matthew Golding (born 19 July 1977) is a former English professional cricketer. He was born at Canterbury in Kent and played for Kent County Cricket Club, Kent Cricket Board and Wiltshire County Cricket Club between 1998 and 2009.

Golding made his debut for Kent's Second XI in 1995 before making his First-class cricket debut for the county in 1999 against the touring New Zealanders. He signed as a professional member of Kent's playing staff at the end of the 1999 season. He played List A cricket for Kent Cricket Board in the 1999 NatWest Trophy before going on to play 36 times for the Kent List A team between 2000 and 2002, including a match against the touring Indian team in 2002 when he recorded his best List A bowling figures of 4/42, including bowling Sachin Tendulkar.

He made his County Championship debut for Kent in 2001 against Somerset at Taunton, taking three wickets in Somerset's first innings. Golding played 11 first-class matches for Kent before being released at the end of the 2002 season. After leaving Kent, Golding played Minor Counties cricket for Wiltshire between 2005 and 2009 as well as making one List A appearance for the county in the 2005 Cheltenham & Gloucester Trophy.

Golding became a P.E. teacher after leaving the professional game. He worked at Abbeyfield School in Chippenham, Wiltshire and, as of October 2017, is a Housemaster and Master in charge of cricket at Abingdon School in Oxfordshire.
