= Micky Stewart =

English cricketer (born 1932)

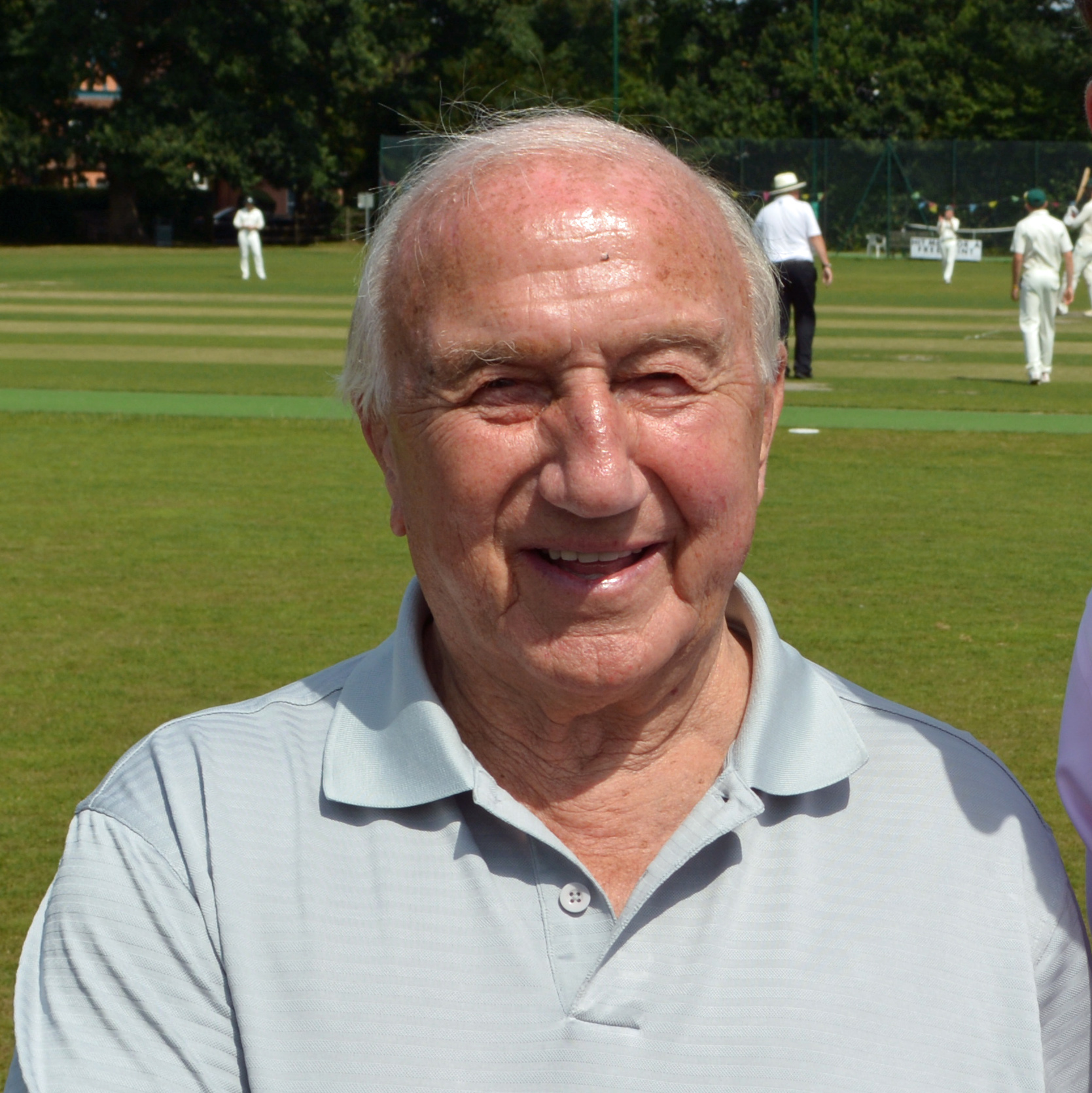
- Stewart in 2019

Personal information
- Full name: Michael James Stewart
- Born: 16 September 1932 (age 94); Herne Hill, England
- Batting: Right-handed
- Bowling: Right arm medium
- Relatives: Alec Stewart (son)

International information
- National side: England
- Test debut (cap 412): 21 June 1962 v Pakistan
- Last Test: 26 January 1964 v India

Domestic team information
- Years: Team
- 1954–1972: Surrey

Career statistics
Competition	Test	FC	LA
Matches	8	530	75
Runs scored	385	26,491	1,172
Batting average	35.00	32.90	16.74
100s/50s	0/2	49/132	1/3
Top score	87	227*	101
Balls bowled	–	136	1
Wickets	–	1	0
Bowling average	–	99.00	–
5 wickets in innings	–	0	–
10 wickets in match	–	0	–
Best bowling	–	1/4	–
Catches/stumpings	6/–	635/–	24/–
Medal record
Men's Cricket
Representing England as Coach
ICC Cricket World Cup
Runner-up	1987 India and Pakistan
Runner-up	1992 Australia and New Zealand
- Source: ESPNcricinfo, 1 October 2009

Michael James Stewart OBE (born 16 September 1932) is an English former cricketer, coach and administrator. A right-handed batsman, Stewart's international career was hampered by illness that curtailed his first overseas tour – serving as vice-captain in India in 1963–64 – and he made only eight Test appearances in all, scoring two half-centuries. His domestic career for Surrey spanned eighteen years, in which he scored over 26,000 first-class runs with forty-nine centuries. He made a century on debut for his county, against Pakistan, and went on to break the then-world record number of catches in a match in 1957 with his strong fielding. He captained Surrey between 1963 and 1972, winning the County Championship in 1971. After retiring, he became a manager at the club and later for England until 1992. He then worked for the ECB until 1997. He was the coach of the English squad which finished as runners-up at the 1987 Cricket World Cup.

Stewart was awarded the OBE in 1998 for services to cricket. The cricket writer Colin Bateman commented, "a staunch patriot and the toughest of opponents, he stamped his mark on Test cricket as England's first full-time manager far more emphatically than he did as a player". His son, Alec Stewart, went on to play over 100 Tests for England.

== Life and career ==
Born at Herne Hill, in south London, Stewart played first-class cricket for Surrey from 1954 to 1972 and also appeared in eight Test matches for England between 1962 and 1964. A right-handed opening batsman, Stewart averaged 35.00 with the bat in Test cricket with a highest score of 87. He was an outstanding close catcher, particularly at short leg. In 1957, he took 77 catches during the season, only one short of Wally Hammond's record. Against Northamptonshire that year, he held seven catches in an innings. It was partly for his fielding that he was selected as one of the Wisden Cricketers of the Year in the 1958 edition of Wisden Cricketers' Almanack.

Stewart toured India in 1963/64 as M. J. K. Smith's vice-captain, but he contracted dysentery and was forced home after playing only one innings.

From 1959 to 1966, he had a successful opening partnership for Surrey with John Edrich, before moving down the batting order to number three. The pair also opened together for England on a couple of occasions. Stewart captained Surrey from 1963 to 1972, winning the County Championship in 1971.

He served as cricket manager of Surrey (1979–1986) and England (1986–1992), and was director of coaching for the ECB (1992–1997). According to Steve James, writing in the Daily Telegraph: "As England's first manager Stewart was way ahead of his time, not least in the aspects of fitness and planning..." James quotes Graham Gooch, captain during the latter part of Stewart's time as England manager, as saying: "We laid the foundations for what you see in the England set-up now. The fitness, the monitoring of fitness, the nutrition, it was the birth of all that on a team scale."

During a winter tour of New Zealand by England, Stewart controversially got involved in an argument with a TV cameraman who was filming footage of an injured David Lawrence on a stretcher; England wicketkeeper Jack Russell also joined in the fracas.

Stewart was also a footballer, playing inside forward for the amateur side Corinthian-Casuals, Charlton Athletic and Wimbledon. In 1956 he played for the England amateur side in their match against France. He had hoped to play for his country in the Olympic Games to be held in Melbourne in November that year, but because he was a professional cricketer the Olympic Committee ruled that he was ineligible. He therefore decided to turn professional as a footballer, and left Corinthian-Casuals and joined Charlton Athletic. He went on to manage Corinthian-Casuals between 1970 and 1975.

He is the father of the former England wicket-keeper, Alec Stewart. At Lord's in 1991, Stewart was able to watch his son Alec score a Test century, something that had eluded him.
