= Mark Tournier =

Australian cricketer

Personal information
- Full name: Mark Andrew Tournier
- Born: 3 May 1971 (age 55); Melbourne, Victoria, Australia
- Batting: Right-handed
- Bowling: Right-arm fast-medium

Domestic team information
- Years: Team
- 2000–2002: British Universities
- 2002: Nottinghamshire Cricket Board

Career statistics
Competition	First-class	List A
Matches	3	1
Runs scored	23	25
Batting average	11.50	25.00
100s/50s	0/0	0/0
Top score	13	25
Balls bowled	522	60
Wickets	9	2
Bowling average	34.33	16.50
5 wickets in innings	1	0
10 wickets in match	0	0
Best bowling	5/88	2/33
Catches/stumpings	0/–	0/–
- Source: Cricinfo, 21 November 2010

Mark Andrew Tournier (born 3 May 1971) is an Australian cricketer. Tournier is a right-handed batsman who bowls right-arm fast-medium. He was born in Melbourne, Victoria.

Tournier made his first-class debut for British Universities in 2000 against the touring Zimbabweans. He played 2 further first-class matches for the team against the touring Pakistanis in 2001 and the touring Sri Lankans in 2002. In his 3 first-class matches, he scored 23 runs at a batting average of 11.50, with a high score of 13. With the ball he took 9 wickets at a bowling average of 34.33, with a single five-wicket haul which gave him best figures of 5/88.

Tournier represented the Nottinghamshire Cricket Board in a single List A match against Cumberland in the 1st round of the 2003 Cheltenham & Gloucester Trophy which was played in 2002. In his only List A match he scored 25 runs and with the ball he took 2 wickets at a bowling average of 16.50, with figures of 2/33.

He has played club cricket for Knypersley Cricket Club in the Derbyshire Premier Cricket League.
