= Matthew Hoggard =

English cricketer (born 1976)

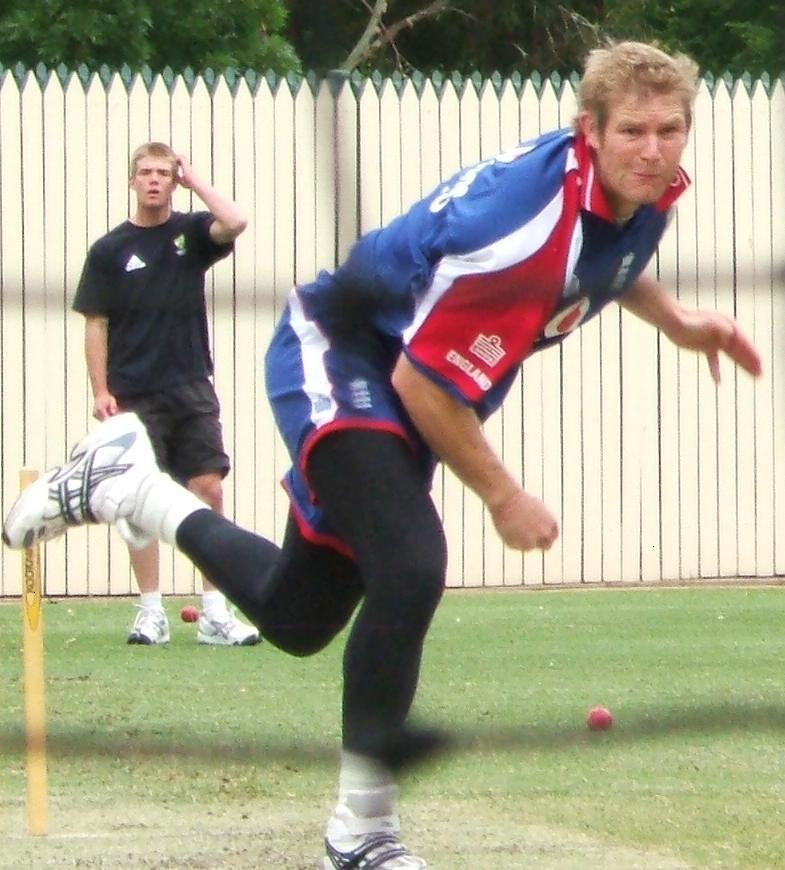

Personal information
- Full name: Matthew James Hoggard
- Born: 31 December 1976 (age 49); Pudsey, West Yorkshire, England
- Nickname: Hoggy, Oggie
- Height: 6 ft 2 in (1.88 m)
- Batting: Right-handed
- Bowling: Right-arm fast-medium
- Role: Bowler

International information
- National side: England (2000–2008)
- Test debut (cap 602): 29 June 2000 v West Indies
- Last Test: 5 March 2008 v New Zealand
- ODI debut (cap 165): 3 October 2001 v Zimbabwe
- Last ODI: 12 April 2006 v India
- ODI shirt no.: 22

Domestic team information
- Years: Team
- 1996–2009: Yorkshire (squad no. 14)
- 1998/99–1999/00: Free State
- 2010–2013: Leicestershire (squad no. 77)

Career statistics
Competition	Test	ODI	FC	LA
Matches	67	26	239	150
Runs scored	473	17	1,908	144
Batting average	7.27	4.25	9.04	6.00
100s/50s	0/0	0/0	0/4	0/0
Top score	38	7	89*	23
Balls bowled	13,909	1,306	42,349	6,932
Wickets	248	32	786	205
Bowling average	30.50	36.00	27.65	25.72
5 wickets in innings	7	1	26	4
10 wickets in match	1	0	1	0
Best bowling	7/61	5/49	7/49	5/28
Catches/stumpings	24/–	5/–	63/–	18/–
- Source: CricketArchive, 7 September 2017

Matthew James Hoggard, MBE (born 31 December 1976) is a former English cricketer, who played international cricket for England cricket team from 2000 to 2008, playing both Test cricket and One Day Internationals. The 6' 2" Hoggard was a right arm fast-medium bowler and right-handed batsman.

He was the captain of Leicestershire from 2010 until he announced his retirement in 2013. Previous to this he played for Yorkshire for a total of thirteen years.

== Personal life ==
In May 2007 Hoggard's wife Sarah gave birth to a baby boy, Ernie, weighing in at 7 lbs 10 oz.

== Domestic career ==
=== Early career ===
Hoggard began his cricketing journey at his local team, the famous Bradford League club, Pudsey Congs CC. He started his domestic career in first-class cricket in 1996. His debut List-A match followed in 1998.

=== Late career ===
In Hoggard's first year as captain, he was involved in a row with Leicestershire chairman, Neil Davidson. Davidson had accused Hoggard and coach Tim Boon of setting a 'very poor example', after Hoggard and Boon had accused Davidson of interfering in team affairs after a string of poor results. Davidson eventually left the county in October 2010. In his first season at Grace Road, Hoggard took an impressive 50 First Class wickets.

In 2011, Leicestershire finished bottom of the County Championship, but under Hoggard's captaincy, won the Twenty 20 Cup for the third time, making the Foxes the most successful English county side in the shortest form of the game.

In September 2013, Hoggard announced his retirement from cricket at the end of the season. Unfortunately, Hoggard did not pick up any wickets in his last two games making the Worcestershire captain, Daryl Mitchell, his last victim in first-class cricket, this was before he announced his retirement.

== International career ==
=== Debut days ===
Hoggard was initially brought into the England side under the wings of Nasser Hussain and Duncan Fletcher in 2000. He was brought into the NatWest Series as a replacement for the injured Andy Caddick. Having only played two tests, Hoggard led the attack during England's 2001–2002 tour of India, and later took 7/63 against New Zealand. He then suffered an "horrific" winter tour of Australia at the hands of Matthew Hayden.

=== Success ===
During a successful tour of the West Indies for Hoggard, he took the 34th hat-trick in Test cricket on 3 April 2004, helping England to bowl out the West Indies for 94 in their second innings of the Third Test at Kensington Oval. This took England to their first series win in the West Indies since 1967–68, becoming the first visiting team to win three Tests in a Caribbean series. Hoggard also scored his highest score with the bat, 38 against the West Indies in August 2004. He then took 12 wickets at Johannesburg against South Africa.

In the 4th Test match of the series in South Africa in January 2005 Hoggard took 12 wickets for 205. Of Englishmen, only Johnny Wardle, who took 12 for 89 in Cape Town in 1956–57, has bettered his figures in South Africa since World War II. His match figures were England's best anywhere since Ian Botham's 13 for 106 against India in 1979–80. During the 2005 Ashes series, Hoggard scored 8 not out with Ashley Giles against Australia in the fourth Test at Trent Bridge in the 2005 Ashes series, which included a well-executed cover drive for four off a Brett Lee full toss, as England won by three wickets by reaching 129 to take a 2–1 series lead.

During the Second Ashes Test at Adelaide in December 2006, Hoggard took 8 wickets in the match, with first innings figures of 7/109, in very unfavourable bowling and especially swing bowling conditions, though England still lost. Hoggard missed the fifth test in Sydney with a side-strain. It ended a run of 40 consecutive tests. As of July 2007, Hoggard was sixth in the list of all-time English Test wicket-takers with 240 from 64 matches.

A graph showing Hoggard's test career bowling statistics and how they have varied over time.

=== Struggling form & retirement ===
Hoggard performed well in the opening two warm up matches at the start of England's tour of Sri Lanka. In the second of these, against the Sri Lanka Cricket President's XI, Hoggard took 5–25 in a match that saw Steve Harmison and James Anderson fall foul of injuries.

After a disappointing performance where England lost the first test, Hoggard was dropped (along with longtime bowling partner, Steve Harmison) for the second test.

He said on 18 July 2008 on BBC Radio 5 Live's Test Match Special programme that he believed he would not play for England again after being left out of the Test squads against both New Zealand and South Africa.

== Post-retirement ==
With Hoggard's international career all but at an end, 2009 saw an increasing amount of him in the guise of a media personality. He released a book, which had a serialisation in The Times, and contributed a regular column to Cricinfo.

Hoggard was considered a scapegoat for his sudden falling out of favour from the England and Wales Cricket Board. "We've had the same problems with the ECB since I started international cricket," he wrote in his book. "There were people slagging them off when I first came in and there are people still slagging them off. And it's not the ECB who pick the side anyway. See if you can find a player with a good word to say about the ECB. What are they going to do, sue me for telling the truth?"

Hoggard was released by Yorkshire at the end of the 2009 season and immediately linked with an unexpected move to Leicestershire. Hoggard was announced as the new captain of Leicestershire on 9 November.

He is now an assistant coach for the women's T20 cricket team Loughborough Lightning. He also works as an after dinner speaker and cricket pundit.

In August 2013, Hoggard featured as a contestant on Celebrity Masterchef. In January 2020, Hoggard joined sports travel company Venatour as their Cricket Ambassador for their upcoming cricket tours.

In November 2021, Hoggard was alleged to have made racist comments - which included things such as 'elephant washers' and 'you lot sit over there' - towards Azeem Rafiq and other players of Asian heritage during his time at Yorkshire at the DCMS select committee hearing on 16 November 2021. It is understood that Hoggard apologised to Rafiq over the phone.

== Honours ==
In the 2006 New Year Honours Hoggard was awarded the MBE for his role in the successful Ashes tournament. He was also named as one of five Wisden Cricketers of the Year in April 2006. On 6 March 2006, Hoggard was officially ranked the 4th best Test match bowler in the world. This was as a result of his Man of the Match performance for England against India in the First Test match at Nagpur in March 2006. On 13 May 2006 he became the tenth England bowler to take 200 Test wickets.

In a 2015 analysis, statistician Andrew Samson calculated that Hoggard was England's best bowler, in terms of the batting average of the batsmen he dismissed in his career.

== Bowling action ==
Matthew Hoggard was a specialist orthodox swing bowler, and usually took the new ball for England in Test cricket. Hoggard's primary role in the team was to utilise the shine on the new ball to test the technique of top-order batsmen against the swinging delivery. If, due to pitch or atmospheric conditions, the new ball did not swing he could be ineffective. Hoggard was seen as the consistent bowler in the team. Hoggard also had a sound defensive batting technique, but was not known for scoring runs, averaging only 7.40 with the bat. He could block up an end for the batsman at the other end to score, and was also used as a nightwatchman.

== Career best performances ==
	Batting				Bowling			
	Score	Fixture	Venue	Season	Score	Fixture	Venue	Season
Tests	38	England v West Indies	The Oval	2004	7–61	England v South Africa	Johannesburg	2005
ODI	7	England v India	Kochi	2006	5–49	England v Zimbabwe	Harare	2001
FC	89*	Yorkshire v Glamorgan	Leeds	2004	7–49	Yorkshire v Somerset	Leeds	2003
LA	23	Leicestershire Foxes v Surrey Brown Caps	The Oval	2011	5–28	Yorkshire Phoenix v Leicestershire Foxes	Leicester	2000
T20	18	Yorkshire Phoenix v Lancashire Lightning	Manchester	2005	3–19	Leicestershire Foxes v Lancashire Lightning	Manchester	2010
