= Ronnie Irani =

Former England cricketer

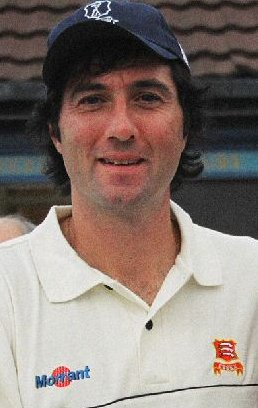

Personal information
- Full name: Ronald Charles Irani
- Born: 26 October 1971 (age 55); Leigh, Lancashire, England
- Nickname: Reggie
- Height: 6 ft 4 in (1.93 m)
- Batting: Right-handed
- Bowling: Right arm medium

International information
- National side: England (1996–2003)
- Test debut (cap 577): 6 June 1996 v India
- Last Test: 22 August 1999 v New Zealand
- ODI debut (cap 137): 23 May 1996 v India
- Last ODI: 26 February 2003 v India
- ODI shirt no.: 15

Domestic team information
- Years: Team
- 1990–1993: Lancashire
- 1994–2007: Essex

Career statistics
Competition	Test	ODI	FC	LA
Matches	3	31	232	315
Runs scored	86	360	13,472	7,733
Batting average	17.20	14.40	41.58	30.93
100s/50s	0/0	0/1	28/72	7/46
Top score	41	53	218	158*
Balls bowled	192	1,283	20,389	10,453
Wickets	3	24	339	309
Bowling average	37.33	41.20	29.51	25.22
5 wickets in innings	0	1	9	4
10 wickets in match	0	0	0	0
Best bowling	1/22	5/26	6/71	5/26
Catches/stumpings	2/–	6/–	79/–	83/–
- Source: Cricinfo, 19 April 2017

Ronald Charles Irani (born 26 October 1971) is an English former cricketer. He played three Tests for England in 1996 and 1999, but found a niche in One Day Internationals, where he gained much praise for his performances.

He spent most of his career at Essex County Cricket Club, latterly as captain, after starting at Lancashire. He is of Irani descent, the Iranis being a community of Persian Zoroastrians who immigrated to India during the British Raj.

Irani was a genuine all-rounder until a knee injury in 2003 forced him to stop bowling and play as a specialist batsman. The injury led to Irani being forced to retire from first-class cricket in June 2007. At Essex, Irani helped bring through promising players such as Alastair Cook and Ravinder Bopara, as well as winning two major One-Day Titles. Professionally he scored over 20,000 runs and took more than 650 wickets during his career.

== Personal life ==
Irani's father Jimmy Irani arrived in Bolton from Bombay, India in 1961 to play a summer's club cricket. During that summer he met 16-year-old Lancastrian Anne Main. The two married and had a son, Ronnie. Jimmy Irani was an enthusiastic, successful and prolific club cricketer with Daisy Hill and Atherton in the Bolton Association who often put up overseas players, such as Farokh Engineer and Javed Miandad, during Ronnie's childhood. From March 1991 to May 1992 Irani was a director of F.A.M. Publishing Ltd, which has since changed its name to Parcel2Go.

== Domestic career ==
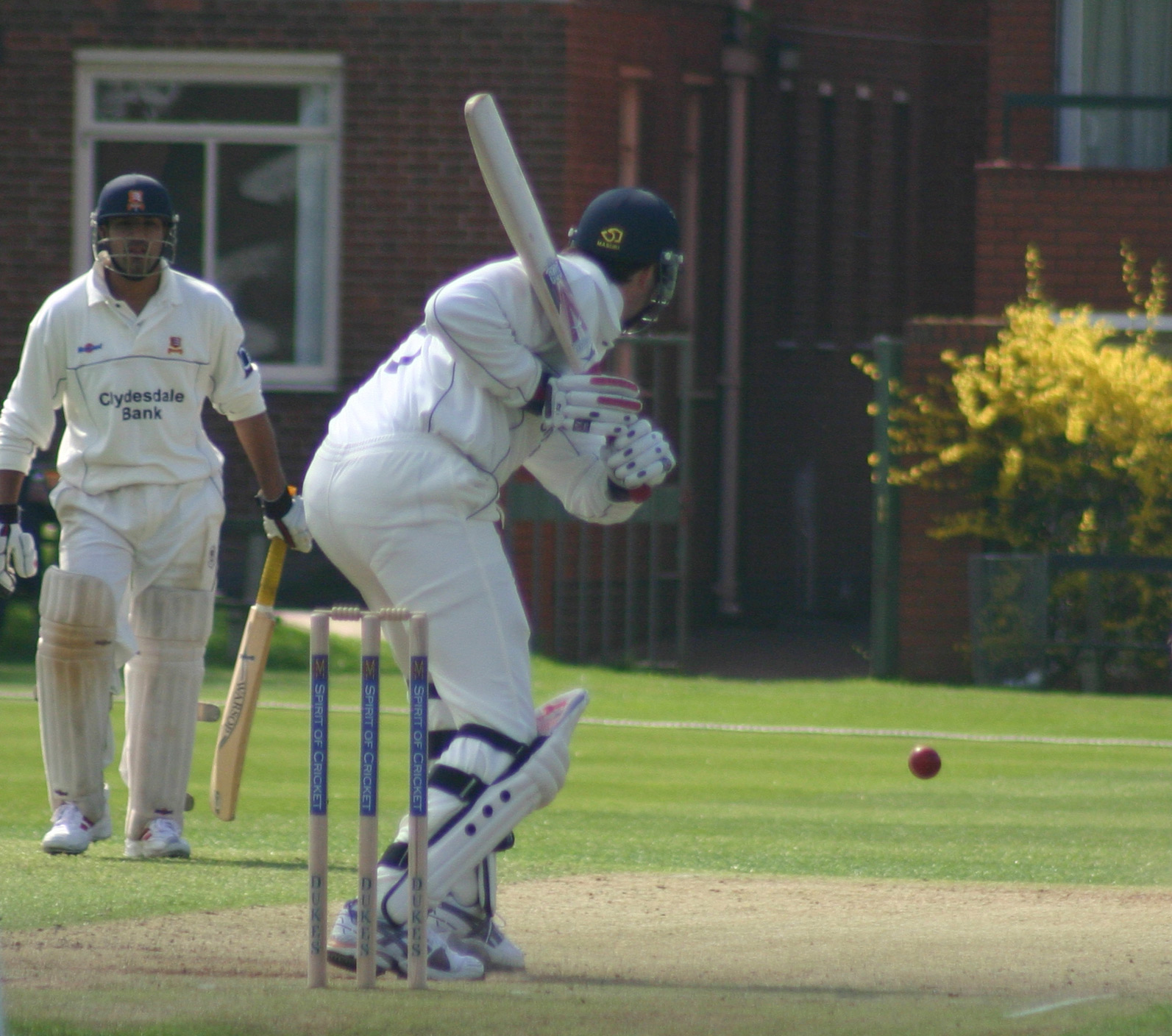
Irani batting against Cambridge UCCE, April 2005

He started his career playing for Lancashire in 1990, before he moved to Essex in 1994. At Essex, he gained cult status, before he became captain in 2000, and is generally accepted to have done a decent job in charge, helping to bring through promising players such as Alastair Cook, Will Jefferson and Ravi Bopara. After Graham Gooch stepped down as the club's head coach prior to the start of the 2005 season, Irani assumed some of these responsibilities in addition to his role as county captain.

In June 2007, he rejected a new contract with Essex and announced his retirement from first-class cricket at the end of the 2007 season. He retired with immediate effect later that month.

== International career ==
Irani was awarded fans' player of the series in Natwest Series 2002 featuring India and Sri Lanka for his allround performance. He scored 169 runs and took 8 wickets in the tri-series.

== After retirement ==
After his retirement, he co-hosted The Alan Brazil Sports Breakfast with Scottish former footballer Alan Brazil on Talksport radio from 2007. On the show, he was nicknamed Chicken, from the dish chicken biryani rhyming with his surname. In 2013 he left the show.

Irani also appeared as a guest on the BBC quiz show A Question of Sport.

In 2009 Irani's autobiography "No Boundaries" was published. He was part of a celebrity 'consortium' (along with Radio 2 DJ Chris Evans) who clubbed together to pay for Paul Gascoigne to receive treatment for alcoholism in the US.

In 2015, Irani took up the position of Cricket Committee Chairman at Essex and expressed his desire for the club to improve its performances. He left the role in 2021.

Irani is also the co-founder/inventor of OrthoSole, an orthotic insole.

== Personality ==
He is known by many sports fans for an "Exercise Routine" during an England One-Day International in Australia. He was doing a warm-up while fielding, and unbeknown to Irani, the Australian fans were imitating his routine behind his back. When he discovered what they were doing, he played up to the tens of thousands of fans and became quicker as to make the fans carry on even more.

Irani is a long time supporter of Manchester United, after being taken to games by his father when he was a child.

Preceded by Graham Beecroft	Talksport breakfast show host with Alan Brazil; 2007–2013	Succeeded by Neil Warnock
