= Alex Tudor =

English cricketer

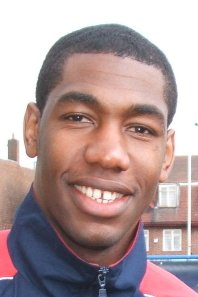

Personal information
- Full name: Alex Jeremy Tudor
- Born: 23 October 1977 (age 49); Kensington, London, England
- Nickname: Big Al, Tudes
- Height: 6 ft 5 in (1.96 m)
- Batting: Right-handed
- Bowling: Right-arm fast
- Role: Bowler

International information
- National side: England
- Test debut (cap 592): 28 November 1998 v Australia
- Last Test: 29 November 2002 v Australia
- ODI debut (cap 169): 7 July 2002 v Sri Lanka
- Last ODI: 13 July 2002 v India

Domestic team information
- Years: Team
- 1995–2005: Surrey
- 2005–2008: Essex
- 2008–2009: Surrey

Career statistics
Competition	Test	ODI	FC	LA
Matches	10	3	129	82
Runs scored	229	9	2,960	470
Batting average	19.08	9.00	21.92	12.05
100s/50s	0/1	0/0	2/9	0/1
Top score	99*	6	144	56
Balls bowled	1,512	127	18,191	3,451
Wickets	28	4	351	111
Bowling average	34.39	34.00	31.40	25.09
5 wickets in innings	1	0	14	0
10 wickets in match	0	0	0	0
Best bowling	5/44	2/30	7/48	4/26
Catches/stumpings	3/–	1/–	36/–	23/–
- Source: ESPNcricinfo, 31 October 2009

Alex Jeremy Tudor (born 23 October 1977) is an English former professional cricketer who spent two spells with Surrey County Cricket Club as well as playing for Essex. He is a right-handed batsman and a right-arm fast bowler. He was twice awarded the NBC Denis Compton Award during the 1997 and 1998 seasons. A highly talented performer with bat and ball, his career was hampered by frequent injury trouble.

== Playing career ==
Tudor's Test debut came in the 1998/99 Ashes series in which he played solidly with the bat and further impressed selectors while bowling, winning the praise of his opponents, in particular Australia's captain Mark Taylor. His further contributions with the bat were the subject of much attention as he batted against New Zealand and hit 99 not out, the highest-ever score by an English nightwatchman, which led him towards a Cricket Writers' Club Young Cricketer of the Year award; batting partner Graham Thorpe received much ribbing from their Surrey teammates for not letting him reach a century.

Recalled to the England cricket team for the third Test at Nottingham against Australia in 2001, he took his best Test innings bowling figures, 5/44, but England lost the match, thereby confirming a seventh successive Ashes series defeat. The following year, recalled to the Test team again, he took his best match figures in a Test match, 7/109, winning the man of the match award in a victory at Manchester against Sri Lanka. However two less successful Tests against India followed.

Initial omission from the 2002/03 Ashes squad was over-ruled when he was selected above several injured players. But he only appeared in the third Test at Perth, which confirmed another Ashes defeat, his tour also ending in injury as he was forced to retire hurt when batting after being struck by a delivery from Brett Lee. This, his tenth Test, proved to be his last international appearance. He had also played three One Day Internationals in 2002, but his One Day International career also ended in disappointment as England narrowly lost the 2002 NatWest Series final to India at Lord's.

Injuries in 2003 and 2004 followed, and despite his recovery being aided by visits to the German doctor Dr Hans-Wilhelm Müller-Wohlfahrt, Tudor was released from his contract by Surrey at the end of the 2004 season. Essex gave him the chance to continue playing first-class cricket the following season, but it was to be another year blighted by injury. He managed to return to action in 2006, playing almost the full season.

In August 2008, after a season in which he had failed to hold down a regular place in the Essex side, the county announced that they would be releasing Tudor at the end of the season. Later that month, he returned to Surrey, initially as part of a loan deal. He rejoined Surrey on 24 October 2008, and spent one final season there, before retiring from county cricket at the end of 2009.

He holds the distinction of bowling one of the most expensive overs on record. Bowling for Surrey against Andrew Flintoff at Old Trafford in 1998 he went for 6–4–4–4–4–6–6–0 (34) and in bowling 2 no balls incurred, under ECB regulations at the time, four more penalty runs for a total of 38 runs in one over.

Alex continued to play for Nottingham's West Indian Cavaliers CC until 2012 but later rejoined his boyhood side of Spencer CC in London. Along with playing PCA (of which he is an ambassador) and charity games. Alex runs his own successful company Alex Tudor Coaching. He has been active in Surrey's African-Caribbean Engagement (ACE) Programme, aimed at encouraging black teenagers into cricket.

Tudor currently coaches cricket at Kimbolton School, an independent school in the Cambridgeshire countryside. Tudor also had a role in the first episode of the Freddie Flintoff documentary Field of Dreams coaching novice cricketers in the Preston region, his involvement was limited however and his contributions in later episodes were less regular.

== Personal life ==
Born in England, Tudor is of Barbadian descent. He is married to wife Mel, a serving police officer. Tudor is also fan of English football team Queens Park Rangers.
