= Peter Willey =

English cricketer

Personal information
- Full name: Peter Willey
- Born: 6 December 1949 (age 76); Sedgefield, County Durham, England
- Nickname: Will
- Height: 6 ft 1 in (1.85 m)
- Batting: Right-handed
- Bowling: Right-arm off break
- Role: All-rounder

International information
- National side: England
- Test debut (cap 468): 22 July 1976 v West Indies
- Last Test: 29 July 1986 v New Zealand
- ODI debut (cap 39): 2 June 1977 v Australia
- Last ODI: 31 March 1986 v West Indies

Domestic team information
- Years: Team
- 1966–1983: Northamptonshire
- 1982/83–1984/85: Eastern Province
- 1984–1991: Leicestershire
- 1992: Northumberland

Umpiring information
- Tests umpired: 25 (1996–2003)
- ODIs umpired: 34 (1996–2003)
- WTests umpired: 1 (2005)
- WODIs umpired: 8 (2007–2012)
- WT20Is umpired: 3 (2009–2012)
- FC umpired: 283 (1992–2015)
- LA umpired: 298 (1993–2015)

Career statistics
Competition	Test	ODI	FC	LA
Matches	26	26	559	458
Runs scored	1,184	538	24,361	11,105
Batting average	26.90	23.39	30.56	28.25
100s/50s	2/5	0/5	44/101	10/67
Top score	102*	64	227	154
Balls bowled	1,091	1,031	58,635	18,520
Wickets	7	13	756	347
Bowling average	65.14	50.69	30.95	32.11
5 wickets in innings	0	0	26	0
10 wickets in match	0	0	3	0
Best bowling	2/73	3/33	7/37	4/17
Catches/stumpings	3/–	4/–	235/–	124/–
- Source: Cricinfo, 17 November 2008

Peter Willey (born 6 December 1949) is a former English cricketer, who played as a right-handed batsman and right-arm offbreak bowler. In and out of the England team, he interrupted his international career for three years by taking part in the first of the England players' South African rebel tours in 1982. After his playing career ended, he became a Test umpire.

== Playing career ==
As his career developed, Willey became a leading exponent of the "open stance" style of batting, where the batsman looks squarely at the bowler, rather than the traditional "side-on" style, looking past his own shoulder at the bowler, a practice later picked up by Hashim Amla of South Africa and Shivnarine Chanderpaul of the West Indies.

Willey made his debut for Northamptonshire aged 16 in 1966, moving to Leicestershire later in his career. He helped Northamptonshire win the Gillette Cup in 1976, and Leicestershire to win the Benson and Hedges Cup in 1985, in both cases winning the man of the match award.

He was called up by England and given a Test debut against the West Indies in 1976. Known for his intimidating and moody image, and his ability to score runs off fast bowlers, he was frequently picked against the formidable West Indian pace attack, only to be dropped again for games against more gentle opposition. In all, 15 of his 26 Tests and 13 of his 26 one-day internationals came against the West Indies, all but two of the remaining Tests coming against Australia. He scored two hundreds against the West Indies, although his overall Test batting average ended at under 27.

His first test hundred came in extraordinary fashion when, in partnership with Bob Willis he saved a test match at the Oval in 1980 which had appeared lost with an unbroken last-wicket partnership of 117. His second Test century, and his highest Test score, 102 not out, came in Antigua that winter. Partly because so many of his Test matches came against the West Indies, who never lost a Test to England in his era, it was his nineteenth Test before he finished on the winning side, in the famous victory at Headingley in 1981 against Australia. In 1985 he was restored to the Test team after joining the rebel tour of 1982, and participated in another tour of the West Indies that winter, playing his final Test in 1986.

While his off-spin was less successful in Test cricket, by the time his playing career ended in 1992 he had compiled over 1,000 wickets in first-class cricket and List A cricket combined, to go with over 35,000 runs, including match figures of 12/138 for T.N. Pearce's XI against the touring New Zealanders in 1978.

== Umpiring career ==
Upon his retirement from playing cricket, Willey became an umpire, becoming responsible for international Test Matches in 1996. However, he declined an offer to join the Elite Panel of ICC Umpires in 2001 when it was established, citing family reasons. Willey continued to umpire Test matches in England until 2015, when he turned 65. ECB policy requires all umpires to retire when they reach this age, in order to allow younger umpires to gain employment. Willey and fellow Northamptonshire team-mate and umpire George Sharp challenged this decision at an employment tribunal, alleging age discrimination on the part of the ECB, but lost their case.

== Personal life ==
Willey is married, and has two children, including David Willey who plays for Northamptonshire County Cricket Club and the England cricket team, and two grandchildren.

== Anecdotes ==
According to an urban myth, it was during a Test match between the West Indies and England, when Michael Holding was about to bowl to Willey, that the radio commentator Brian Johnston said: "The bowler's Holding, the batsman's Willey". While Wisden stated that there is no record of Johnston or anyone else actually saying this, Johnston's co-commentator, Henry Blofeld, recalled the incident as having taken place at The Oval in 1976. The story is sometimes told the other way around, with Willey bowling to Holding: however, Willey did not bowl to Holding in that particular match.

In 1979, Willey caught Dennis Lillee off the bowling of Graham Dilley, resulting in a scorecard entry of: "Lillee, c. Willey, b. Dilley".

== See also ==
- List of Test cricket umpires
- List of One Day International cricket umpires
