= Ashley Giles =

English cricketer (born 1973)

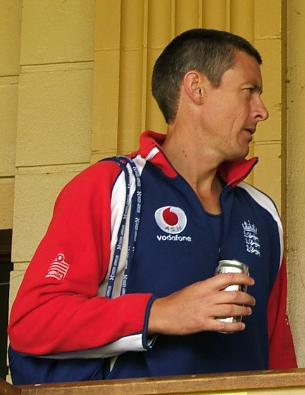

Personal information
- Full name: Ashley Fraser Giles
- Born: 19 March 1973 (age 53); Chertsey, Surrey, England, UK
- Nickname: Gilo, Skinny, Skinny Dipper, Splash, King of Spain, The Wheelie Bin
- Height: 6 ft 4 in (1.93 m)
- Batting: Right-handed
- Bowling: Slow left arm orthodox
- Role: Bowler

International information
- National side: England (1997–2006)
- Test debut (cap 590): 2 July 1998 v South Africa
- Last Test: 1 December 2006 v Australia
- ODI debut (cap 145): 24 May 1997 v Australia
- Last ODI: 12 July 2005 v Australia
- ODI shirt no.: 29

Domestic team information
- Years: Team
- 1993–2006: Warwickshire

Career statistics
| Competition | Test | ODI | FC | LA |
|---|---|---|---|---|
| Matches | 54 | 62 | 178 | 224 |
| Runs scored | 1,421 | 385 | 5,346 | 2,089 |
| Batting average | 20.89 | 17.50 | 26.33 | 20.89 |
| 100s/50s | 0/4 | 0/0 | 3/22 | 1/5 |
| Top score | 59 | 41 | 128* | 107 |
| Balls bowled | 12,180 | 2,856 | 37,304 | 9,729 |
| Wickets | 143 | 55 | 539 | 272 |
| Bowling average | 40.60 | 37.61 | 29.60 | 25.59 |
| 5 wickets in innings | 5 | 1 | 26 | 3 |
| 10 wickets in match | 0 | 0 | 3 | 0 |
| Best bowling | 5/57 | 5/57 | 8/90 | 5/21 |
| Catches/stumpings | 33/– | 22/– | 80/– | 73/– |
- Source: ESPNcricinfo, 24 August 2017

Ashley Fraser Giles MBE (born 19 March 1973) is an English former first-class cricketer, who played 54 Test matches and 62 One Day Internationals for England before being forced to retire due to a recurring hip injury. Giles played the entirety of his 14-year first-class career at Warwickshire County Cricket Club.

Giles started his career as a fast bowler before an early injury forced him to become a slow left-arm spinner. He made his first-class debut for Warwickshire in 1993, but it was 1996 when he gained a regular place in the side, winning the NBC Denis Compton Award for being 'The Most Promising Young Player' at the club. Giles was awarded his One Day International debut against Australia in May 1997, and 36 wickets in the 1998 season led to his first Test match against South Africa, although it would be a further two years before he would play another Test for England.

He did not have the most fluent bowling action and was unable to turn the ball a huge amount, although at 6 feet 4 inches (193 cm), he was able to use his height to extract plenty of bounce. As a right-handed batsman, Giles scored three first-class centuries, but his highest international score was only 59, an innings that helped England win The Ashes in 2005. Between November 2000 and the emergence of Monty Panesar in 2006 (during his first prolonged injury lay-off), Giles was England's first-choice spin bowler, although he was constantly having to justify his selection. This came to a head in 2004 when Giles considered retirement before a match-winning 9-wicket haul against the West Indies gave him the confidence to perform at the highest level.

Following his playing career Giles has had spells as white-ball Head Coach and Director of Cricket with England, as well as holding similar roles as county level with Warwickshire and Lancashire. In 2023 he joined Worcestershire County Cricket Club as chief executive.

== Domestic career and influences ==
Ashley Giles spent his early years living in Woking, attending the Kingfield First and Middle Schools. Giles benefited from a cricket-loving teacher, and became involved with District and County Cricket at Under-9 level. After his parents moved to Ripley, Surrey, he attended the George Abbot School in Guildford, completing his GCSEs and A-levels. The Giles family was heavily involved with Ripley Cricket Club: Ashley's father, brother Andrew, cousins and uncles all played for the club, as did both paternal and maternal grandfathers previously. Giles soon moved into the Saturday 2nd XI, opening the bowling with close friend Ian Ward. At this stage, both players were aspiring fast bowlers, and a deadly force for Surrey Under-19s. Giles moved to Guildford Cricket Club, working under coach Brian Ruby alongside future professionals Darren and Martin Bicknell.

Giles advanced through the county age-groups, and toured Barbados with Surrey Young Cricketers in 1990/91. While at Guildford, an injury forced Giles to try bowling spin, which brought him some success. Giles made his debut for the Surrey Second XI in 1990, and was named Surrey Young Cricketer of the Year in 1991. The following season, he played one further match for Surrey but they were unable to offer him a professional contract. After an initial trial with Dennis Amiss, Giles was awarded a one-year contract with Warwickshire County Cricket Club.

Between 1992 and 1995, Giles played the majority of his games for Warwickshire Second XI, scoring over 2,500 runs and taking 165 wickets in this period. He made his first-class debut for Warwickshire against Kent in May 1993; his second match was against Durham later that season. In September 1993, he made his List A debut against the touring Zimbabweans, his first wicket being that of Grant Flower, although it would not be until the tail-end of the 1995 season before Giles began to cement his place in the Warwickshire side taking 16 wickets at an average of 22.12 (in 6 matches). In 1996 Giles won the NBC Denis Compton Award, and before his debut for the full national side in 1998 he toured Australia, Sri Lanka and Kenya with the England A team.

== International career ==
=== England debut to 2004 ===
Giles played winter cricket in South Africa for Vredenberg & Saldanha (1992–95) and Avendale (1995–96). On 2 July 1998, Giles made his Test debut against South Africa, and took 1 for 106 in 36 overs. He then went on to tour Australia in the One Day squad. On 31 December, it was announced that Giles was to step out of the One Day match between the ODI squad and the Bradman XI, and into the Test squad for the final Test match in Sydney. He was chosen in light of Australia's selection of Shane Warne, Colin Miller and Stuart MacGill, England captain Alec Stewart stating that the selection of Giles gave England another option.

Giles took part in England's 2000—01 tour of Pakistan, establishing himself as "England's No. 1 slow bowler." He suffered an achilles tendon injury in February which affected his bowling, conceding 83 runs from his 19 overs, with Duncan Fletcher citing the injury as the cause of this. Giles returned, however, to take part in the Test matches. The press at the time suggested that Giles was to match Muttiah Muralitharan in wicket taking, but he dismissed this idea. His tendon injury recurred in April, however, and was rested for six weeks.

Giles then impressed during India's tour of England in the winter of 2001. In Domestic Cricket, Giles scored 96 from 139 balls for Warwickshire against Middlesex, as well as taking the wicket of Andrew Strauss. He went on to take three more wickets as Middlesex reeled. During the 2002 tour of Australia, Giles took six wickets at Brisbane, but he was forced to end his tour when Steve Harmison injured Giles' wrist during nets practice. In the winter of 2003, Giles took eight wickets against Sri Lanka in the first Test, and hit 18 and 17 to keep England in the series with a draw. Giles was later named for the 2004 touring squad to the West Indies.

=== Hundredth Test wicket ===
Until 2004, his most successful bowling had been in Pakistan and Sri Lanka, and that year started with an uninspiring performance in the Caribbean. However, in July 2004 he recorded match-figures of 9–210 in the first Test at Lord's (including his 100th Test wicket, Brian Lara), which won him the Man of the Match award. He followed this with his best Test-figures of 9–122 in the second Test at Edgbaston, and was instrumental in England beating West Indies twice. In that series he gained the nickname "King of Spain", after a set of mugs ordered in 2000 (for his testimonial year) were erroneously printed with that slogan, instead of "King of Spin". There were originally only two of these mugs produced, one of which Giles used for his coffee in the dressing room (this mug was subsequently stolen), and another on display in the club shop. However, after the error was publicised, a further two hundred mugs were produced with King Juan Carlos on the other side and were snapped up by Warwickshire fans.

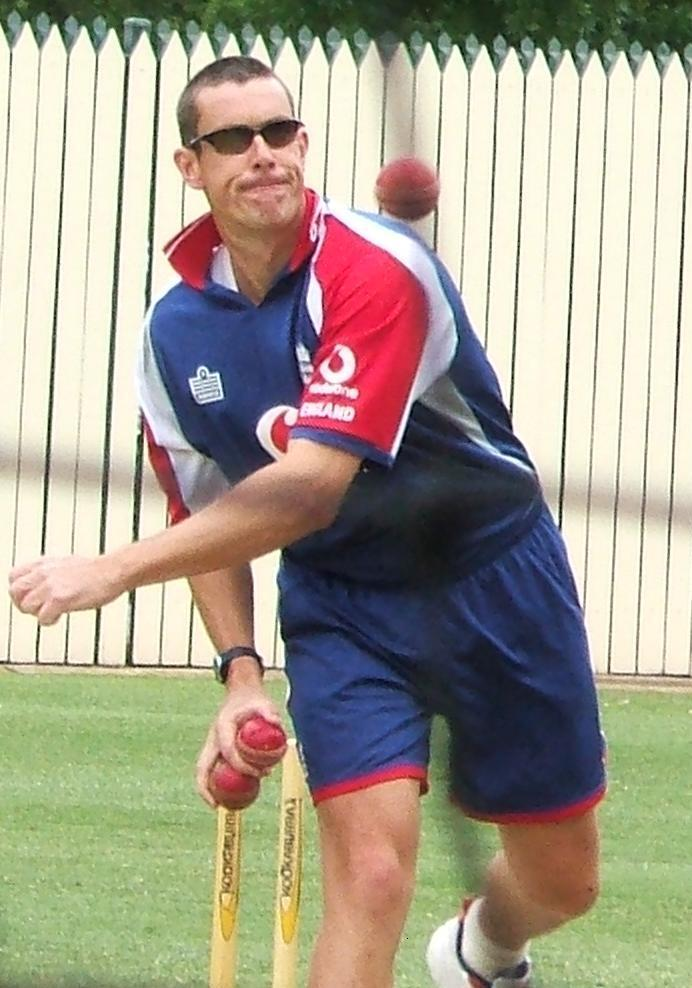
Giles bowls in the Adelaide Oval nets

Fans during the Ashes series of 2005 also regularly sang "Y viva España" in Giles' honour. Giles was, until that successful run of form, also gently derided by commentators: the BBC's Test Match Special commentator Henry Blofeld famously labelled him a "Wheelie bin" because of his trundling run-up, much to Giles' disgust. Blofeld however, insisted that the moniker was not malicious. (It was originally bestowed on Giles by The Guardian journalist David Hopps.)

=== 2005 Ashes ===
In 2005, he was named as one of five cricketers of the year by Wisden Cricketers' Almanack. In the 2005 Ashes series, Giles captured the wickets of all of the top Australian batsmen at least once during the series. He hit the winning runs in the fourth Test at Trent Bridge to give England a 2–1 lead. He contributed a Test-best 59 runs and a century partnership with Kevin Pietersen to ensure the draw in the final Test at The Oval and a 2–1 series victory. However, his ten wickets in the series came at a high average of 57.80.

=== 2006, injury and retirement ===
In February 2006, a recurring hip injury forced Giles out of both the Test and ODI sections of England's tour to India that year. His number 8 spot was taken first by left-arm spinner Ian Blackwell and then fast bowler Liam Plunkett, and Giles admitted that left-arm spinner Monty Panesar was another threat to his place. In the final Test, veteran off-break bowler Shaun Udal replaced him, with some success. In the Tests of summer 2006, whilst Giles was injured for the entire season, Panesar played against both Sri Lanka and Pakistan, with conspicuous success. On 24 April 2006, Giles gave an interview stating that although he had at one point feared his career might be in danger, he was now "a lot more confident and happy" after being diagnosed with a sportman's hernia. At the end of October 2006, after spending time in India with the England Champions Trophy squad, Giles was passed fit for selection, and took Panesar's place in the team for the first Test at Brisbane. However, he was dropped for the third Test in the series, with Panesar reclaiming his place.

Giles flew home from the 2006 Ashes tour of Australia on 1 December in order to care for his wife who had a brain tumour. He was not selected for England's 2007 World Cup squad, nor in their 2007 summer performance squad. On Warwickshire's pre-season tour he suffered some hip discomfort, which revealed a need for an operation. It kept him out for most of the 2007 English county series, and on 9 August, Giles officially announced his retirement from all forms of cricket, following advice from doctors in light of his injury.

== Coaching career ==
Following his retirement, in September 2007, Giles became Warwickshire's director of cricket, replacing Mark Greatbatch, ahead of Dermot Reeve. In November two months later, Giles was named the official spin coach in the England Performance Programme. On 18 January 2008, Giles was added to a new four-man panel, along with Peter Moores and James Whitaker, headed by Geoff Miller, which replaced David Graveney in the role of national selector for the England team, the latter having been removed from the position and reinstated as a national performance manager. Led Warwickshire to the Division One County Championship in September 2012, Division Two County Championship 2008, CB40 2010 & Pro 40 Division Two 2009.

On 28 November 2012 the England and Wales Cricket Board confirmed Ashley Giles would become England's limited overs Head Coach taking charge of the Twenty20 and One Day International teams.

Following his departure from that post in April 2014 he spent the summer months as match analyst for ESPN, playing in the Warwickshire Premier League for Nuneaton CC in return for a charitable donation and setting a world record by climbing Mount Kilimanjaro to play in the highest game of cricket ever played (also for charity).

In October 2014 he was appointed as cricket director and head coach of Lancashire County Cricket Club. In December 2016, he was appointed as sport director of Warwickshire County Cricket Club

He became the managing director of men's cricket for England in December 2018. It was announced on 2 February 2022 that he was leaving the role following a poor Ashes cricket performance over the winter of 2021. During his time in office he was associated with the controversial rotation of players and the merging of the chairman of selectors and the coach.

Giles was appointed as Chief Executive by Worcestershire, beginning in the role on 3 July 2023.

== Personal life ==
Giles is a resident of Droitwich Spa, Worcestershire and was named an 'Honorary Citizen' of the town by the mayor after the 2005 Ashes success. The award was created for him, as he did not meet the usual criteria to become a Freeman. Giles was awarded an MBE in the 2006 New Year Honours for his role in the successful Ashes-winning squad. He is married to the Norwegian Stine (née Osland), with whom he has two children, Anders Fraser and Matilde Louise. He is a lifelong supporter of Queens Park Rangers F.C.

He is a graduate of Manchester Metropolitan University's Masters of Sport Directorship programme.

== Awards ==
- NBC Denis Compton Award 1996 and 1997
- Wisden Cricketer of the Year 2005
- Awarded the MBE in 2005
- Honorary Citizen of Droitwich Spa 2005
