= Alec Stewart =

English cricketer

Alec Stewart OBE
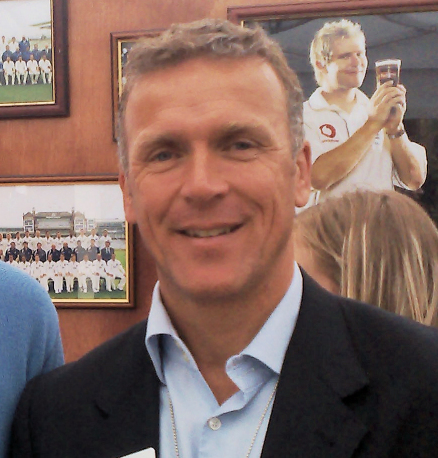

Personal information
- Full name: Alec James Stewart
- Born: 8 April 1963 (age 63); Merton Park, England
- Nickname: The Gaffer
- Height: 5 ft 10 in (178 cm)
- Batting: Right-handed
- Bowling: Right-arm medium
- Role: Wicket-keeper-batsman
- Relatives: Micky Stewart (father)

International information
- National side: England (1989–2003)
- Test debut (cap 543): 24 February 1990 v West Indies
- Last Test: 8 September 2003 v South Africa
- ODI debut (cap 104): 15 October 1989 v Sri Lanka
- Last ODI: 2 March 2003 v Australia
- ODI shirt no.: 4

Domestic team information
- Years: Team
- 1981–2003: Surrey

Career statistics
Competition	Test	ODI	FC	LA
Matches	133	170	447	504
Runs scored	8,463	4,677	26,165	14,771
Batting average	39.54	31.60	40.06	35.08
100s/50s	15/45	4/28	48/148	19/94
Top score	190	116	271*	167*
Balls bowled	20	0	502	4
Wickets	0	–	3	0
Bowling average	–	–	148.66	–
5 wickets in innings	–	–	0	–
10 wickets in match	–	–	0	–
Best bowling	–	–	1/7	–
Catches/stumpings	263/14	159/15	721/32	442/48
Medal record
Men's Cricket
Representing England
ICC Cricket World Cup
Runner-up	1992 Australia and New Zealand
- Source: Cricinfo, 14 October 2007

Alec James Stewart OBE (born 8 April 1963) is an English former cricketer, and former captain of the England cricket team, who played Test cricket and One Day Internationals as a right-handed wicket-keeper-batsman. He is the fifth-most-capped English cricketer ever in Test matches and third-most-capped in One Day Internationals (ODIs), having played in 133 Tests and 170 ODIs. An attacking batsman in tests against the new ball, Stewart is regarded as one of England's greatest openers. Pakistani fast bowler Wasim Akram considers him one of the most difficult batsmen he ever bowled to. He was a part of the English squad which finished as runners-up at the 1992 Cricket World Cup.

== Domestic career ==
The younger son of former English Test cricketer Micky Stewart, Stewart was educated at Clarence Avenue Infants' School, Coombe Hill Junior School and Tiffin School in Kingston upon Thames. He made his debut for Surrey in 1981, earning a reputation as an aggressive opening batsman and occasional wicketkeeper.

Stewart is a well-known supporter of Surrey County Cricket Club and Chelsea Football Club. When shirt numbers were introduced for One Day International cricket, Stewart chose the number 4 shirt in honour of his favourite Chelsea player when growing up, John Hollins, and kept that shirt number throughout his career.

== International career ==
Stewart made his England debut in the first Test of the 1989/90 tour of the West Indies, along with Nasser Hussain, who would eventually replace him as England captain.

At the start of his career, Stewart was a specialist opening batsman for England, with wicketkeeping duties being retained by Jack Russell, who was generally recognised as the superior gloveman and who batted down the order. However, Russell, the inferior batsman, would often be dropped to improve the balance of the side (i.e. to accommodate an extra bowler or batsman), in which case Stewart would don the gloves. After enduring years of selection and deselection, Russell retired from international cricket in 1998, leaving Stewart unrivalled as England's keeper-batsman until his own retirement in 2003.

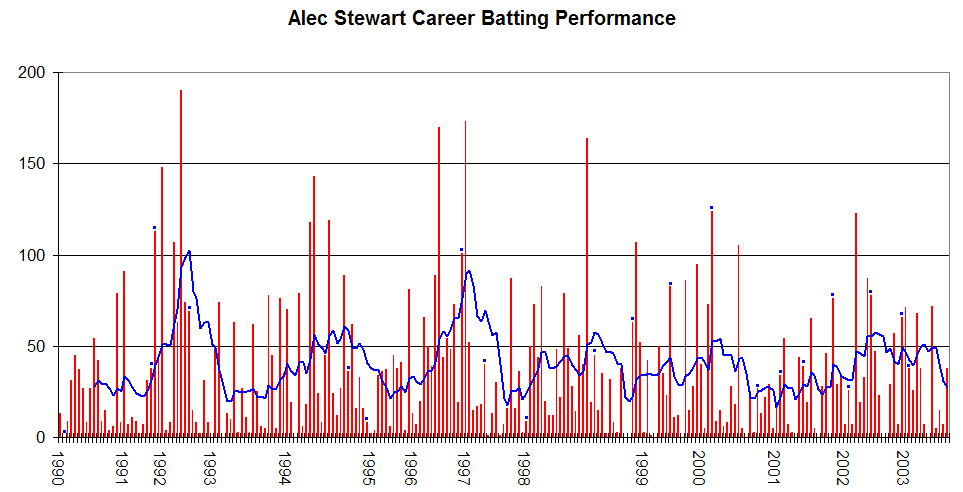
Alec Stewart's career performance graph.

=== Prominence ===
His highest Test score, 190, was against Pakistan in the drawn first Edgbaston Test on 4 June 1992; it was his fourth century in five Tests. In 1994 at the Kensington Oval he became only the seventh Englishman to score centuries in both innings of a Test match, scoring 118 and 143 as the West Indies were beaten at their Bridgetown "fortress" for the first time since 1935.

Stewart's batting average (39.54) is the lowest of any player to have scored 8000 or more runs in Test cricket: he is the only player to have scored over 8000 runs despite an average of under 40. However, when played as a specialist batsman in Test cricket, Stewart averaged 46.90 in 51 games with 9 centuries. Since World War II, only Len Hutton, Geoff Boycott, Dennis Amiss and Alastair Cook have bettered Stewart's average of 46 as a specialist opening batsman for England. As wicketkeeper-batsman he averaged 34.92 from 82 tests, higher than many of his contemporaries. He was on the losing side in a record 54 Test Matches.

Stewart holds the record for scoring the most test runs without a career double century in test history (8463).

=== Captaincy ===
Stewart was groomed for the England captaincy under Graham Gooch, deputising for him in four tests in India and Sri Lanka in 1993, but when Gooch retired from the captaincy later that year Mike Atherton was chosen to succeed him. Stewart was asked to captain England in 1998 when Mike Atherton resigned. Despite being aged 35 at the time, Stewart's level of fitness was impeccable, especially bearing in mind that most players do not continue beyond 37. As it was Stewart went on to play for England beyond his 40th birthday – but as events were to transpire, his captaincy of England barely lasted 12 months.

In his first series as captain, against South Africa, Stewart scored an outstanding 164 in the third Test at Old Trafford to salvage a draw, a result which eventually enabled England to overturn a 1–0 deficit to win the series 2–1. Nonetheless, failures against Australia and in the 1999 Cricket World Cup saw him sacked from the captaincy to be replaced by Hussain. During his captaincy, he dropped down the order and did not open the batting. He continued to deputise occasionally as captain of England's one-day side, and became the second international captain to concede a match in 2001, after a pitch invasion during a One Day International against Pakistan rendered the continuation of play impossible. He continued as an England player for five more seasons, and became only the fourth player to score a century in his 100th Test, scoring 105 against the West Indies at Old Trafford in 2000.

Stewart also set a record for playing the most number of ODI matches(28) as a captain who has kept wicket and opened the batting.

== After cricket ==
In 2004, Stewart became a founding director of Arundel Promotions with specific responsibility for player management and representation. Cricket playing clients include Paul Collingwood, Ian Bell, Ashley Giles and Matt Prior.

In 2009, Stewart rejoined Surrey as a part-time consultant to the coaching staff specialising in batting, wicket keeping and mentoring.

Since retiring from playing Stewart has taken on the role as the Club Ambassador for Surrey County Cricket Club and was made an executive director in 2011.

On 17 June 2013, it was announced by Surrey County Cricket Club that Stewart would take charge of first team affairs following the sacking of Chris Adams, until a long term successor was found. In October 2013 the club announced that Graham Ford would become head coach in February 2014, with Stewart becoming Director of Cricket, a new position. In March 2024, he announced that he would be stepping down from this role at the end of the year. In October 2024 it was announced that Stewart would remain at the club as a part-time high-performance cricket advisor.

He was the subject of This Is Your Life in 2003 when he was surprised by Michael Aspel while playing golf at the Royal Automobile Club in Epsom.

== Honours ==
- One of five Wisden Cricketers of the Year 1993
- Appointed an MBE on 13 June 1998
- Appointed an OBE on 14 June 2003
- As a mark of his achievements Surrey County Cricket Club have named the gates at the Vauxhall End after him: the Alec Stewart Gates
- Awarded an honorary doctorate by the University of Surrey in 2005

Sporting positions
Preceded by Graham Gooch; Mike Atherton	English national cricket captain (deputised 1993); 1998–1999	Succeeded by Graham Gooch; Nasser Hussain
Preceded by Ian Greig	Surrey captain 1992–1997	Succeeded by Adam Hollioake
