= List of cricketers by number of international centuries scored =

This list is a compilation of total centuries scored by international cricketers, split between different formats of the game.

A qualification of 15 overall centuries is used for entry onto the men's list. To date, 133 cricketers have scored 15 or more international centuries, 88 of whom went on to score 20 or more centuries, 45 have scored 30 or more centuries, and 21 have a total of 40 or more centuries. Across all three formats, 10 players have scored 50 or more centuries, 6 have scored 60 or more centuries and 3 have scored 70 or more centuries, 2 have scored 80 or more centuries in their respective international careers. Only one cricketer has scored 100 centuries.

Five centuries is used as the qualifying standard for the women's list; to date, 34 players have reached this mark.

== Key ==
^	Inducted into the ICC Cricket Hall of Fame
ǂ	Denotes player who is still playing internationally
—N/a	Indicates player never played format

== Men's international cricket ==
As of 21 November 2026

Rank	Player	Period	Team	Test	ODI	T20I	Total
1	Sachin Tendulkar^	1989–2013	India	51	49	0	100
2	Virat Kohli ǂ	2008–2026	India	30	55	1	86
3	Ricky Ponting^	1995–2012	Australia / World XI	41	30	0	71
4	Kumar Sangakkara^	2000–2015	Sri Lanka	38	25	0	63
5	Jacques Kallis^	1995–2014	South Africa	45	17	0	62
6	Joe Root ǂ	2012–2026	England	41	20	0	61
7	Hashim Amla ^	2004–2019	South Africa	28	27	0	55
8	Mahela Jayawardene^	1997–2015	Sri Lanka / Asia XI	34	19	1	54
9	Brian Lara^	1990–2007	West Indies	34	19	–	53
10	Rohit Sharma ǂ	2007–2026	India	12	35	5	52
11	David Warner	2009–2024	Australia	26	22	1	49
11	Steve Smith ǂ	2010–2026	Australia	37	12	0	49
13	Rahul Dravid^	1996–2012	India	36	12	0	48
13	Kane Williamson	2010–2026	New Zealand	33	15	0	48
15	AB de Villiers^	2004–2018	South Africa	22	25	0	47
16	Chris Gayle	1999–2021	West Indies	15	25	2	42
16	Sanath Jayasuriya	1989–2011	Sri Lanka	14	28	0	42
18	Shivnarine Chanderpaul^	1994–2015	West Indies	30	11	0	41
18	Younis Khan	2000–2017	Pakistan	34	7	0	41
20	Matthew Hayden ^	1993–2009	Australia	30	10	0	40
20	Ross Taylor	2006–2022	New Zealand	19	21	0	40
22	Tillakaratne Dilshan	1999–2016	Sri Lanka	16	22	1	39
22	Mohammad Yousuf	1998–2010	Pakistan	24	15	0	39
24	Alastair Cook^	2006–2018	England	33	5	0	38
24	Sourav Ganguly^	1992–2008	India	16	22	–	38
24	Virender Sehwag^	1999–2013	India	23	15	0	38
24	Mark Waugh	1988–2002	Australia	20	18	–	38
28	Graeme Smith ^	2002–2014	South Africa	27	10	0	37
29	Michael Clarke	2003–2015	Australia	28	8	0	36
30	Sunil Gavaskar^	1971–1987	India	34	1	–	35
30	Herschelle Gibbs	1996–2010	South Africa	14	21	0	35
30	Desmond Haynes^	1978–1994	West Indies	18	17	–	35
30	Inzamam-ul-Haq	1991–2007	Pakistan	25	10	0	35
30	Viv Richards^	1974–1991	West Indies	24	11	–	35
30	Steve Waugh^	1985–2004	Australia	32	3	–	35
36	Gary Kirsten	1993–2004	South Africa	21	13	–	34
37	Adam Gilchrist^	1996–2008	Australia	17	16	0	33
38	Babar Azam ǂ	2015–2026	Pakistan	9	20	3	32
38	Kevin Pietersen^	2004–2014	England	23	9	0	32
40	Saeed Anwar	1989–2003	Pakistan	11	20	–	31
40	Quinton de Kock ǂ	2012–2026	South Africa	6	23	2	31
40	Javed Miandad^	1975–1996	Pakistan	23	8	–	31
40	Aravinda de Silva^	1984–2003	Sri Lanka	20	11	–	31
44	Allan Border^	1978–1994	Australia	27	3	–	30
44	Gordon Greenidge^	1974–1991	West Indies	19	11	–	30
46	Mohammad Azharuddin	1984–2000	India	22	7	–	29
46	Don Bradman^	1928–1948	Australia	29	–	–	29
46	Shai Hope ǂ	2015–2026	West Indies	5	21	3	29
49	Graham Gooch^	1975–1995	England	20	8	–	28
50	Nathan Astle	1995–2007	New Zealand	11	16	0	27
50	Marvan Atapattu	1990–2007	Sri Lanka	16	11	0	27
50	Greg Chappell^	1970–1984	Australia	24	3	–	27
50	Andrew Strauss	2003–2012	England	21	6	0	27
54	Ian Bell	2004–2015	England	22	4	0	26
54	David Boon	1984–1996	Australia	21	5	–	26
54	Garfield Sobers^	1954–1974	West Indies	26	0	–	26
54	Marcus Trescothick	2000–2006	England	14	12	0	26
58	David Gower^	1978–1992	England	18	7	–	25
58	Tamim Iqbal	2007–2023	Bangladesh	10	14	1	25
58	Tom Latham ǂ	2012–2026	New Zealand	17	8	0	25
61	Shikhar Dhawan	2010–2022	India	7	17	0	24
61	KL Rahul ǂ	2014–2026	India	13	9	2	24
63	Jonny Bairstow ǂ	2011–2024	England	12	11	0	23
63	Geoffrey Boycott^	1964–1982	England	22	1	–	23
63	Faf du Plessis	2011–2021	South Africa	10	12	1	23
63	Shubman Gill ǂ	2019–2026	India	11	11	1	23
63	Martin Guptill	2009–2022	New Zealand	3	18	2	23
63	Justin Langer	1993–2007	Australia	23	0	–	23
63	VVS Laxman	1996–2012	India	17	6	–	23
63	Mushfiqur Rahim ǂ	2005–2026	Bangladesh	14	9	0	23
71	Ijaz Ahmed	1986–2001	Pakistan	12	10	–	22
71	Azhar Ali	2010–2022	Pakistan	19	3	0	22
71	Colin Cowdrey^	1954–1975	England	22	0	–	22
71	Wally Hammond^	1927–1947	England	22	–	–	22
71	Michael Hussey	2004–2013	Australia	19	3	0	22
76	Martin Crowe^	1982–1995	New Zealand	17	4	–	21
76	Mohammad Hafeez	2003–2021	Pakistan	10	11	0	21
76	Neil Harvey^	1948–1963	Australia	21	–	–	21
76	Travis Head ǂ	2016–2026	Australia	13	8	0	21
76	Richie Richardson	1983–1996	West Indies	16	5	–	21
81	Ken Barrington^	1955–1968	England	20	–	–	20
81	Dinesh Chandimal ǂ	2010–2026	Sri Lanka	16	4	0	20
81	Gautam Gambhir	2003–2016	India	9	11	0	20
81	Carl Hooper	1987–2003	West Indies	13	7	–	20
81	Clive Lloyd^	1966–1985	West Indies	19	1	–	20
81	Saleem Malik	1982–1999	Pakistan	15	5	–	20
81	Ramnaresh Sarwan	2000–2013	West Indies	15	5	0	20
81	Brendan Taylor ǂ	2004–2026	Zimbabwe	8	11	1	20
81	Mark Taylor	1989–1999	Australia	19	1	–	20
90	Zaheer Abbas^	1969–1985	Pakistan	12	7	–	19
90	Aaron Finch	2011–2022	Australia	0	17	2	19
90	Len Hutton^	1937–1955	England	19	–	–	19
90	Angelo Mathews ǂ	2008–2025	Sri Lanka	16	3	0	19
90	Brendon McCullum	2002–2016	New Zealand	12	5	2	19
90	Cheteshwar Pujara	2010–2023	India	19	0	–	19
90	Alec Stewart	1989–2003	England	15	4	–	19
90	Ben Stokes	2011–2026	England	14	5	0	19
98	Michael Atherton	1989–2001	England	16	2	–	18
98	Dean Jones	1984–1994	Australia	11	7	–	18
98	Usman Khawaja	2011–2026	Australia	16	2	0	18
98	Allan Lamb	1982–1992	England	14	4	–	18
98	Damien Martyn	1992–2006	Australia	13	5	0	18
98	Kusal Mendis ǂ	2015–2026	Sri Lanka	11	7	0	18
98	Upul Tharanga	2005–2019	Sri Lanka	3	15	0	18
98	Michael Vaughan	1999–2008	England	18	0	0	18
98	Dilip Vengsarkar	1976–1992	India	17	1	–	18
107	Denis Compton^	1937–1957	England	17	–	–	17
107	Daryll Cullinan	1993–2001	South Africa	14	3	–	17
107	Stephen Fleming	1994–2008	New Zealand	9	8	0	17
107	Dimuth Karunaratne	2011–2025	Sri Lanka	16	1	–	17
107	Marlon Samuels	2000–2018	West Indies	7	10	0	17
107	Yuvraj Singh	2000–2017	India	3	14	0	17
113	Harry Brook ǂ	2022–2026	England	10	4	2	16
113	MS Dhoni^	2004–2019	India/Asia XI	6	10	0	16
113	Andy Flower^	1992–2003	Zimbabwe	12	4	–	16
113	Eoin Morgan	2006–2022	England/Ireland	2	14	0	16
113	Thilan Samaraweera	1998–2013	Sri Lanka	14	2	0	16
113	Paul Stirling ǂ	2008–2026	Ireland	1	14	1	16
113	Herbert Sutcliffe^	1924–1935	England	16	–	–	16
113	Graham Thorpe	1993–2005	England	16	0	–	16
121	Dennis Amiss	1966–1977	England	11	4	–	15
121	Jos Buttler ǂ	2011–2026	England	2	11	2	15
121	Paul Collingwood	2001–2017	England	10	5	0	15
121	Jack Hobbs^	1909–1930	England	15	–	–	15
121	Nasser Hussain	1989–2003	England	14	1	–	15
121	Rohan Kanhai^	1957–1975	West Indies	15	0	–	15
121	Daryl Mitchell ǂ	2019–2026	New Zealand	6	9	0	15
121	Ajinkya Rahane	2011–2023	India	12	3	0	15
121	Ravi Shastri	1981–1992	India	11	4	–	15
121	Navjot Singh Sidhu	1983–1999	India	9	6	–	15
121	Clyde Walcott^	1948–1960	West Indies	15	–	–	15
121	Doug Walters	1965–1981	Australia	15	0	–	15
121	Everton Weekes^	1948–1958	West Indies	15	–	–	15

== Women's international cricket ==
As of 25 October 2026

Rank	Player	Period	Teams	Test	ODI	T20I	Total
1	Smriti Mandhana ǂ	2013–2026	India	2	14	2	18
1	Laura Wolvaardt ǂ	2016–2026	South Africa	1	13	4	18
3	Meg Lanning	2010–2023	Australia	0	15	2	17
3	Hayley Matthews ǂ	2014–2026	West Indies	–	14	3	17
5	Tammy Beaumont	2009–2026	England	1	12	1	14
5	Suzie Bates	2006–2026	New Zealand	–	13	1	14
7	Chamari Athapaththu ǂ	2009–2026	Sri Lanka	–	9	4	13
7	Charlotte Edwards^	1996–2016	England	4	9	0	13
9	Nat Sciver-Brunt ǂ	2013–2026	England	2	10	0	12
9	Claire Taylor^	1998–2011	England	4	8	0	12
11	Janette Brittin^	1979–1998	England	5	5	–	10
11	Sophie Devine	2006–2026	New Zealand	–	9	1	10
11	Karen Rolton ^	1995–2009	Australia	2	8	0	10
11	Stafanie Taylor ǂ	2008–2026	West Indies	–	10	0	10
15	Alyssa Healy	2010–2026	Australia	0	8	1	9
15	Harmanpreet Kaur ǂ	2009–2026	India	0	8	1	9
15	Beth Mooney ǂ	2016–2026	Australia	1	6	2	9
18	Tazmin Brits ǂ	2018–2026	South Africa	0	7	1	8
18	Debbie Hockley^	1979–1996	New Zealand	4	4	–	8
18	Mithali Raj	2002–2022	India	1	7	0	8
21	Sidra Ameen ǂ	2011–2026	Pakistan	–	7	0	7
21	Belinda Clark^	1991–2005	Australia	2	5	0	7
21	Amelia Kerr ǂ	2016 –2026	New Zealand	–	5	2	7
21	Amy Satterthwaite	2007–2022	New Zealand	–	7	0	7
21	Annabel Sutherland ǂ	2020–2026	Australia	4	3	0	7
21	Sarah Taylor^	2006–2019	England	0	7	0	7
27	Enid Bakewell^	1968–1982	England	4	2	–	6
27	Heather Knight	2010–2026	England	2	3	1	6
29	Deandra Dottin ǂ	2008–2026	West Indies	–	3	2	5
29	Marizanne Kapp ǂ	2009–2026	South Africa	1	4	0	5
29	Jill Kennare	1982–1987	Australia	3	2	–	5
29	Esha Oza ǂ	2018–2026	United Arab Emirates	–	0	5	5
29	Ellyse Perry ǂ	2007–2026	Australia	2	3	0	5
29	Danni Wyatt-Hodge ǂ	2010–2026	England	0	2	3	5

== See also ==
- List of cricketers with centuries in all international formats
