= List of international cricket centuries by Adam Gilchrist =

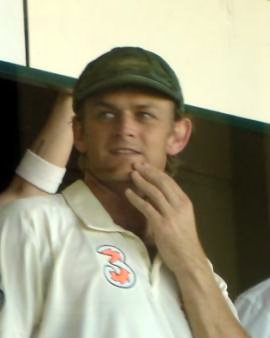
Australian batsman and wicketkeeper Adam Gilchrist

Adam Gilchrist is a retired international Australian batsman and wicketkeeper. He scored centuries (scores of 100 or more) 33 times in his career, in both Test and One Day International (ODI) matches. Describing his batting philosophy simply as "just hit the ball", he has been called "one of the most destructive batsmen the sport has ever seen".

Selected for the Australian ODI side, Gilchrist made his debut in October 1996 against South Africa in the Titan Cup at Faridabad. His first century came in January 1998 against the same opponents, this time at the Sydney Cricket Ground (SCG). Opening the batting, he scored 100 runs from 104 deliveries, and led Australia to a seven-wicket victory. Gilchrist's third ODI century helped Australia to equal the world record for the highest ODI runchase, while his fourth, against Sri Lanka in 1999, helped Australia achieve the highest successful run chase in ODI history at the SCG at the time. His fifth ODI century, 154 against the same team later in the tournament, broke Dean Jones and Ricky Ponting's Australian record score of 145. Gilchrist's sixth ODI century, 128 from 98 deliveries against New Zealand, helped Australia on their way to their highest ever ODI total. He reached the milestone in 78 balls, equalling the Australian record of Allan Border for the fastest hundred in ODIs. As part of Gilchrist's eighth century, he and Ponting shared an Australian second-wicket record partnership of 225. He was named the Australian One-Day International Player of the Year in both 2003 and 2004. Gilchrist's highest score in ODI cricket is 172, achieved against Zimbabwe in January 2004. Gilchrist's century against the World XI came from 73 deliveries, breaking his own Australian record by five balls. He broke this mark again with his 14th century, reaching three figures in 67 balls. His penultimate ODI century was made in the 2007 Cricket World Cup final which also happened to be his only world cup century. Scoring 149 runs from 104 deliveries, including eight sixes and thirteen fours, Gilchrist made the highest score and quickest century in the final of the World Cup. Australia won every ODI match in which Gilchrist scored a century, and he retired with 16 to his name, scoring at a rate of more than one run per delivery in 13 of them.

Gilchrist made his Test debut against Pakistan in November 1999, and scored his first international century in the second match of the series. Scoring an unbeaten 149 in the fourth innings of the match, he led Australia to a four-wicket victory in Hobart. This was the third highest successful runchase in Test history and the highest on Australian soil. His second Test century helped to extend Australia's world record streak of consecutive Test wins to 16. This came after the Australians fell to 5/99 in reply to India's total of 171, before Gilchrist scored 122 from 112 deliveries, featuring in a 197-run partnership with Matthew Hayden in 32 overs. His highest Test score, 204 not out, was made against South Africa at the New Wanderers Stadium, Johannesburg in February 2002. Featuring in a partnership of 317 with Damien Martyn, this was the fastest double century in Test history at the time, in terms of deliveries received. He followed this with 138 from 108 balls in the next match, and ended the three-Test series with 473 runs from 474 balls, at a batting average of 157.66. In the same year, he was named as one of the Wisden Cricketers of the Year. In 2006, he made the second-fastest century in Test history, hitting 100 from 57 balls, including three sixes in a single over against English bowler Monty Panesar. Usually batting at number seven in the Test side, Gilchrist scored centuries against all nine other Test nations. By the time of his retirement from international cricket in January 2008, he had scored 17 Test centuries. This far surpasses other Australian wicketkeepers (Ian Healy and Brad Haddin both scored four) and as of 2025, Gilchrist has still scored the majority of Test centuries by Australian wicketkeepers (17 out of 33).

== Key ==
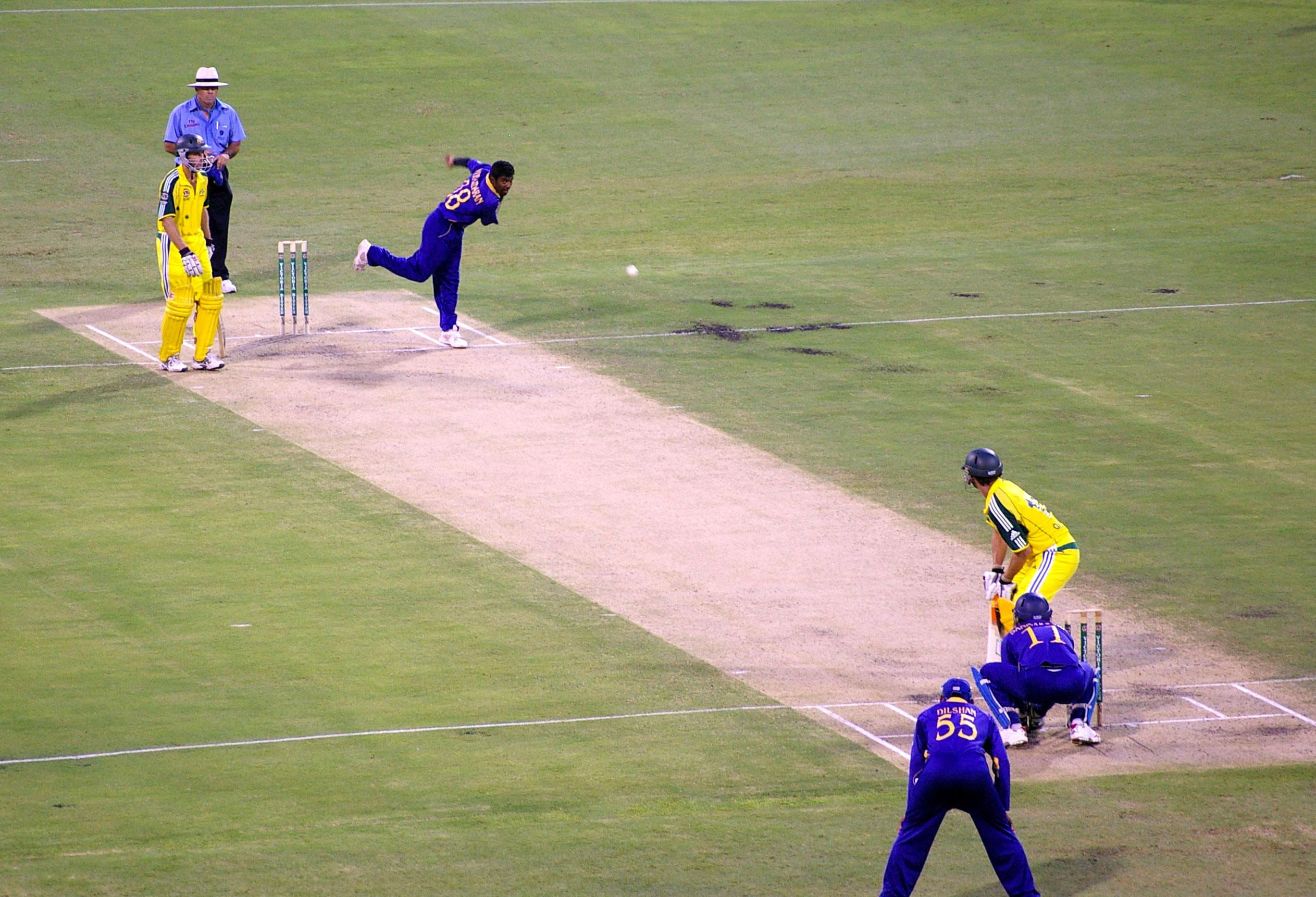
Sri Lankan spin bowler Muttiah Muralitharan bowls to Adam Gilchrist in February 2006. Gilchrist hit a century in 67 balls and went on to make 122 before he was bowled by Muralitharan.

Symbol	Meaning
*	Remained not out
♠	Player of the match
Test	The number of the Test matches played in that series
Pos.	Position in the batting order
Inn.	The innings of the match
S.R.	Strike rate during the innings.
H/A/N	The venue was at home (Australia), away or neutral.
Lost	The match was lost by Australia.
Won	The match was won by Australia.
Draw	The match was drawn.

== Test centuries ==
No.	Score	Against	Pos.	Inn.	Test	Venue	H/A	Date	Result
1	149*	Pakistan	7	4	2/3	Bellerive Oval, Hobart	Home	18 November 1999	Won
2	122♠	India	7	2	1/3	Wankhede Stadium, Mumbai	Away	27 February 2001	Won
3	152♠	England	7	2	1/5	Edgbaston, Birmingham	Away	5 July 2001	Won
4	118	New Zealand	7	1	1/3	Brisbane Cricket Ground, Woolloongabba, Brisbane	Home	8 November 2001	Draw
5	204*♠	South Africa	7	1	1/3	New Wanderers Stadium, Johannesburg	Away	22 February 2002	Won
6	138*	South Africa	7	2	2/3	Newlands, Cape Town	Away	8 March 2002	Won
7	133	England	7	2	5/5	Sydney Cricket Ground, Sydney	Home	2 January 2003	Lost
8	101*	West Indies	5	1	2/4	Queen's Park Oval, Port of Spain, Trinidad	Away	19 April 2003	Won
9	113*	Zimbabwe	7	1	1/2	Western Australia Cricket Association Ground, Perth	Home	9 October 2003	Won
10	144	Sri Lanka	3	3	2/3	Asgiriya Stadium, Kandy	Away	16 March 2004	Won
11	104	India	7	1	1/4	M Chinnaswamy Stadium, Bangalore	Away	6 October 2004	Won
12	126	New Zealand	7	2	1/2	Brisbane Cricket Ground, Woolloongabba, Brisbane	Home	18 November 2004	Won
13	113	Pakistan	6	1	3/3	Sydney Cricket Ground, Sydney	Home	2 January 2005	Won
14	121♠	New Zealand	8	2	1/3	Jade Stadium, Christchurch	Away	10 March 2005	Won
15	162♠	New Zealand	7	1	2/3	Basin Reserve, Wellington	Away	18 March 2005	Draw
16	144♠	Bangladesh	6	2	1/2	Fatullah Osmani Stadium, Fatullah	Away	9 April 2006	Won
17	102*	England	7	3	3/5	Western Australia Cricket Association Ground, Perth	Home	14 December 2006	Won

== One Day International centuries ==
No.	Score	Against	Pos.	Inn.	S.R.	Venue	H/A/N	Date	Result
1	100♠	South Africa	1	2	96.15	Sydney Cricket Ground, Sydney	Home	26 January 1998	Won
2	118♠	New Zealand	1	2	100.85	Lancaster Park, Christchurch	Away	8 February 1998	Won
3	103	Pakistan	1	2	99.03	Gaddafi Stadium, Lahore	Away	10 November 1998	Won
4	131♠	Sri Lanka	1	2	111.01	Sydney Cricket Ground, Sydney	Home	13 January 1999	Won
5	154♠	Sri Lanka	1	1	119.37	Melbourne Cricket Ground, Melbourne	Home	7 February 1999	Won
6	128♠	New Zealand	2	1	130.61	Jade Stadium, Christchurch	Away	26 February 2000	Won
7	105♠	South Africa	1	2	100.96	Kingsmead, Durban	Away	3 April 2002	Won
8	124♠	England	1	1	119.23	Melbourne Cricket Ground, Melbourne	Home	15 December 2002	Won
9	111♠	India	1	1	106.73	M Chinnaswamy Stadium, Bangalore	Away	12 November 2003	Won
10	172♠	Zimbabwe	1	1	136.50	Bellerive Oval, Hobart	Home	16 January 2004	Won
11	121*♠	England	1	2	119.80	Kennington Oval, London	Away	12 July 2005	Won
12	103♠	ICC World XI	1	1	130.37	Docklands Stadium, Melbourne	Home	7 October 2005	Won
13	116♠	Sri Lanka	1	2	110.47	Western Australia Cricket Association Ground, Perth	Home	29 January 2006	Won
14	122♠	Sri Lanka	1	2	134.06	Brisbane Cricket Ground, Woolloongabba, Brisbane	Home	14 February 2006	Won
15	149♠	Sri Lanka	1	1	143.26	Kensington Oval, Bridgetown, Barbados	Neutral	28 April 2007	Won
16	118♠	Sri Lanka	1	1	89.39	Western Australia Cricket Association Ground, Perth	Home	15 February 2008	Won
