= List of international cricket centuries by Graham Gooch =

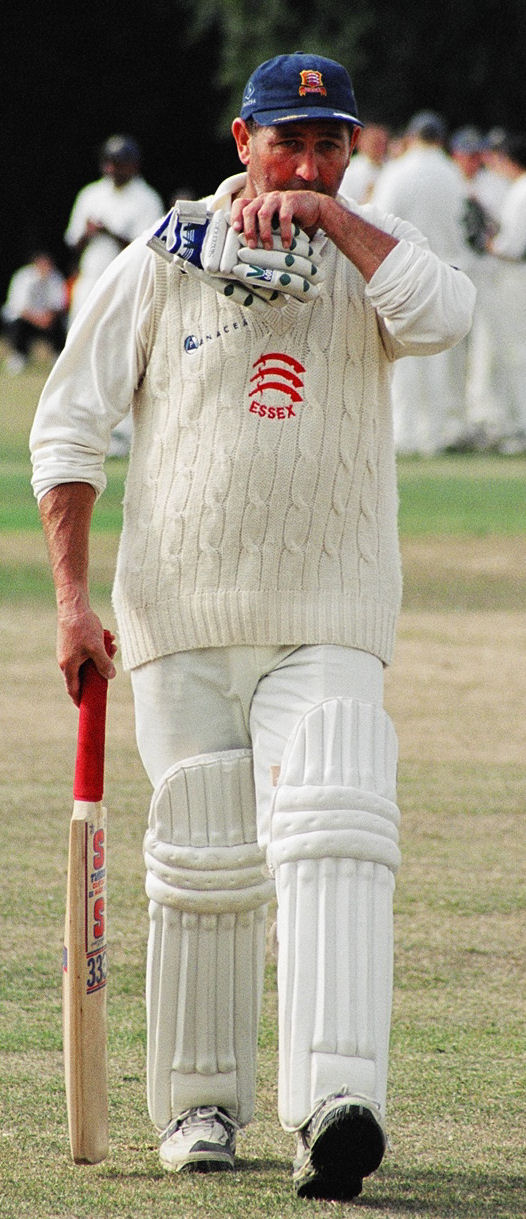
Gooch has scored 28 international centuries for England.

Graham Gooch is a former cricketer who captained Essex and England. He has scored centuries (100 or more runs in a single innings) in Test and One Day International (ODI) matches on twenty and eight occasions respectively, in an international career spanning nearly two decades. He is one of the most successful international batsmen of his generation; through a first-class career spanning from 1973 until 2000, he became the most prolific run scorer of all time with 67,057. With 8,900 runs, Gooch was the leading Test run-scorer for England until overtaken by Alastair Cook in 2015. Gooch is one of 25 players in history to have scored over 100 first-class centuries. Having coached at Essex, he was full-time test batting coach for the England cricket team 2012–2014.

Five years after Gooch's Test debut where he made a pair of ducks against Australia at Edgbaston in July 1975, he scored his first Test century with 123 against the West Indies at Lord's in June 1980. Gooch's highest Test score is 333, which he made in the first innings against India in 1990. As of August 2026, this is the third-highest Test score by an Englishman (after Len Hutton's 364 and Wally Hammond's 336 not out), and is the equal fourteenth-highest score in Test history. He went on to score 123 in the second innings of the same Test match, becoming the sixth Englishman at that time to have scored a century in both innings of a Test match, and the first for over 40 years. Gooch is one of fewer than 60 batsmen to carry his bat in a Test innings when, in 1991 against the West Indies, he remained not out at the end of the England innings with a score of 154. He is also one of only seven cricketers in Test history, and the only on a score of 100 or greater, to have been dismissed by handling the ball, when he flicked the ball away from the stumps against Australia in 1993.

Gooch scored 32 on his One Day International (ODI) debut, against the West Indies at Scarborough in August 1976. His first ODI century came in August 1980. Scoring 108, and making an opening partnership of 154 with Geoffrey Boycott, Gooch's innings led England to a 47-run victory over Australia at Edgbaston. Gooch's highest ODI score is 142 which he achieved against Pakistan in November 1987. As of October 2026, this is the twentieth-highest score by an Englishman in ODI history.

== Key ==
Key
Symbol	Meaning
*	Remained not out
†	Man of the match
‡	Captained the England cricket team
Balls	Balls faced
Pos.	Position in the batting order
Inn.	The innings of the match
Test	The number of the Test match played in that series
S/R	Strike rate during the innings
H/A/N	Venue was at home (England), away or neutral
Date	Date the match was held, or the starting date of match for Test matches
Lost	The match was lost by England.
Won	The match was won by England.
Drawn	The match was drawn.

== Test cricket centuries ==
List of Test centuries scored by Graham Gooch
No.	Score	Against	Pos.	Inn.	Test	Venue	H/A/N	Date	Result	Ref
1	123	West Indies	1	1	2/5	Lord's Cricket Ground, London	Home	19 June 1980	Drawn	
2	116	West Indies	1	4	3/5	Kensington Oval, Bridgetown, Barbados	Away	13 March 1981	Lost	
3	153	West Indies	1	1	5/5	Sabina Park, Kingston, Jamaica	Away	10 April 1981	Drawn	
4	127	India	1	2	5/6	M. A. Chidambaram Stadium, Chennai	Away	13 January 1982	Drawn	
5 †	196	Australia	1	1	6/6	Kennington Oval, London	Home	29 August 1985	Won	
6	114	India	1	1	1/3	Lord's Cricket Ground, London	Home	5 June 1986	Lost	
7 †	183	New Zealand	1	3	1/3	Lord's Cricket Ground, London	Home	24 July 1986	Drawn	
8	146	West Indies	1	3	1/5	Trent Bridge, Nottingham	Home	2 June 1988	Drawn	
9 ‡	154	New Zealand	1	1	3/3	Edgbaston, Birmingham	Home	5 July 1990	Won	
10 †‡	333	India	1	1	1/3	Lord's Cricket Ground, London	Home	26 July 1990	Won	
11 †‡	123	India	1	3	1/3	Lord's Cricket Ground, London	Home	26 July 1990	Won	
12 ‡	116	India	1	1	2/3	Old Trafford Cricket Ground, Manchester	Home	9 August 1990	Drawn	
13 †‡	117	Australia	1	4	4/5	Adelaide Oval, Adelaide	Away	25 January 1991	Drawn	
14 †‡	154*	West Indies	1	3	1/5	Headingley, Leeds	Home	6 June 1991	Won	
15 ‡	174	Sri Lanka	1	3	1/1	Lord's Cricket Ground, London	Home	22 August 1991	Won	
16 †‡	114	New Zealand	1	3	2/3	Eden Park, Auckland	Away	30 January 1992	Won	
17 †‡	135	Pakistan	1	2	4/5	Headingley, Leeds	Home	23 July 1992	Won	
18 ‡	133	Australia	1	4	1/6	Old Trafford Cricket Ground, Manchester	Home	3 June 1993	Lost	
19 ‡	120	Australia	5	3	3/6	Trent Bridge, Nottingham	Home	1 July 1993	Drawn	
20 †	210	New Zealand	3	2	1/3	Trent Bridge, Nottingham	Home	2 June 1994	Won	

== One Day International centuries ==
List of ODI centuries scored by Graham Gooch
No.	Score	Balls	Against	Pos.	Inn.	S/R	Venue	H/A/N	Date	Result	Ref
1 †	108	113	Australia	1	1	95.57	Edgbaston, Birmingham	Home	22 August 1980	Won	
2	115	159	Australia	1	1	72.32	Edgbaston, Birmingham	Home	1 June 1985	Lost	
3	117*	164	Australia	1	2	71.34	Lord's, London	Home	3 June 1985	Won	
4 †	129*	118	West Indies	1	2	109.32	Queen's Park Oval, Port of Spain	Away	4 March 1986	Won	
5 †	115	136	India	1	1	84.55	Wankhede Stadium, Mumbai	Away	5 November 1987	Won	
6 †	142	134	Pakistan	1	1	105.97	National Stadium, Karachi	Away	20 November 1987	Won	
7	136	162	Australia	1	1	83.95	Lord's, London	Home	29 May 1989	Lost	
8 ‡	112*	152	New Zealand	1	2	73.68	Kennington Oval, London	Home	25 May 1990	Won	
