= List of international cricket centuries by Garfield Sobers =

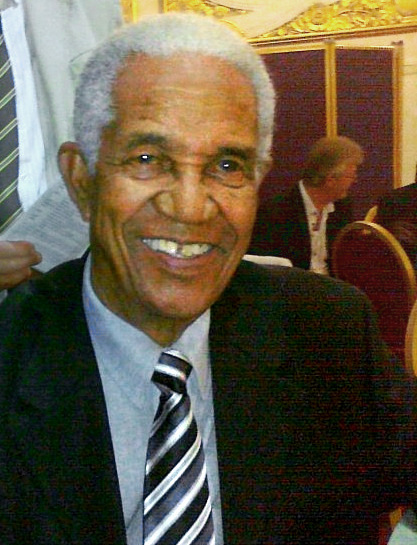
Sobers held the record for the second highest number of centuries in Test cricket at the time of his retirement.

Sir Garfield Sobers (also known as Gary or Garry Sobers) is a former international cricketer who represented the West Indies cricket team between 1954 and 1974. He scored centuries (100 or more runs in an innings) on 26 occasions. Widely acknowledged as the "greatest all-rounder", he was described by Australian cricketer Don Bradman as a "five-in-one cricketer". (Note: In addition to batting and fielding, Sobers could bowl three different types of deliveries—left-arm seam and swing, slow left-arm orthodox and left-arm wrist spin.) In 93 Tests, Sobers scored 8,032 runs—at a batting average of 57.78—and claimed 235 wickets. He held the record for most runs by a player in Test cricket until 1981. (Note: England's Geoffrey Boycott surpassed his record.) Sobers was named one of the five Wisden Cricketers of the Year in 1964, and one of the five Wisden Cricketers of the Century in 2000. He entered into the ICC Cricket Hall of Fame when the International Cricket Council (ICC) formally inducted him alongside 55 initial inductees in 2009.

Sobers made his Test debut against Pakistan in 1954. He scored his first century (365 not out) against the same team during the third Test of the 1957–58 home series. In the event, he became the youngest player to complete a triple century. Sobers' innings remained the highest individual score in Test cricket for 36 years until it was transcended by Brian Lara in 1994; the innings, however, remains the highest maiden century for a player in Tests. In the fourth Test of the same series, Sobers went on to score centuries in both the innings; he ended up scoring 824 runs at an average of 137.33 in the series. In terms of centuries scored, he was most successful against England (10 centuries). Sobers made scores of 150 or more in a Test match innings on thirteen occasions, and was dismissed five times between scores of 90 and 99. As of March 2019, he has the third-highest number of centuries for West Indies in Tests.

Sobers made his solitary One Day International (ODI) appearance in a match against England in September 1973; he was dismissed for a duck.

== Key ==
Key
Symbol	Meaning
*	Remained not out
†	Captained the West Indies cricket team
Pos.	Position in the batting order
Inn.	The innings of the match
Test	The number of the Test match played in that series
H/A/N	Venue was at home (West Indies), away or neutral
Date	Date the match was held, or the starting date of match for Test matches
Lost	The match was lost by West Indies
Won	The match was won by West Indies
Drawn	The match was drawn
Tied	The match was tied

== Test cricket centuries ==
List of Test centuries scored by Garfield Sobers
No.	Score	Against	Pos.	Inn.	Test	Venue	H/A/N	Date	Result	Ref
1	365*	Pakistan	3	2	3/5	Sabina Park, Kingston	Home	26 February 1958	Won	
2	125	Pakistan	2	2	4/5	Bourda, George Town	Home	13 March 1958	Won	
3	109*	Pakistan	3	4	4/5	Bourda, George Town	Home	13 March 1958	Won	
4	142*	India	1	3	1/5	Brabourne Stadium, Bombay	Away	28 November 1958	Drawn	
5	198	India	4	3	2/5	Green Park Stadium, Kanpur	Away	12 December 1958	Won	
6	106*	India	6	1	3/5	Eden Gardens, Calcutta	Away	31 December 1958	Won	
7	226	England	4	2	1/5	Kensington Oval, Bridgetown	Home	6 January 1960	Drawn	
8	147	England	4	2	3/5	Sabina Park, Kingston	Home	17 February 1960	Drawn	
9	145	England	4	2	4/5	Bourda, George Town	Home	9 March 1960	Drawn	
10	132	Australia	4	1	1/5	Brisbane Cricket Ground, Brisbane	Away	9 December 1960	Tied	(Note: As of 2013, this is the first of two occasions where a Test match ended in a tie.)
11	168	Australia	4	1	3/5	Sydney Cricket Ground, Sydney	Away	13 January 1961	Won	
12	153	India	5	2	2/5	Sabina Park, Kingston	Home	7 March 1962	Won	
13	104	India	5	1	5/5	Sabina Park, Kingston	Home	13 April 1962	Won	
14	102	England	6	1	4/6	Headingley, Leeds	Away	25 July 1963	Won	
15	161 †	England	6	3	1/5	Old Trafford Cricket Ground, Manchester	Away	2 June 1966	Won	
16	163* †	England	6	1	2/5	Lord's Cricket Ground, London	Away	16 June 1966	Drawn	
17	174 †	England	6	1	4/5	Headingley, Leeds	Away	4 August 1966	Won	
18	113* †	England	6	3	2/5	Sabina Park, Kingston	Home	8 February 1968	Drawn	
19	152 †	England	5	1	1/3	Bourda, George Town	Home	28 March 1968	Drawn	
20	110 †	Australia	6	1	4/5	Adelaide Cricket Ground, Adelaide	Away	24 January 1969	Drawn	
21	113 †	Australia	5	4	3/5	Sydney Cricket Ground, Sydney	Away	14 February 1969	Lost	
22	108* †	India	5	3	3/5	Bourda, George Town	Home	19 March 1971	Drawn	
23	178* †	India	5	1	4/5	Kensington Oval, Bridgetown	Home	1 April 1971	Drawn	
24	132 †	India	6	2	5/5	Queens Park Oval, Port of Spain	Home	13 April 1971	Drawn	
25	142 †	New Zealand	7	3	3/5	Kensington Oval, Bridgetown	Home	23 March 1972	Drawn	
26	150*	England	6	1	3/3	Lord's Cricket Ground, London	Away	23 August 1973	Won	
