= List of international cricket centuries by Steve Waugh =

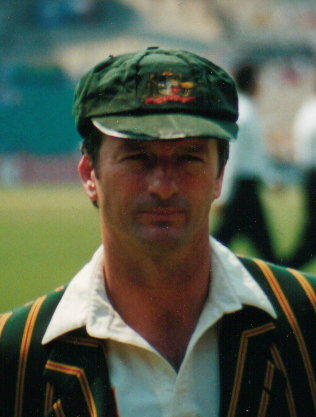
Steve Waugh has scored the third-highest number of centuries .

Steve Waugh is a former cricketer and captain of the Australia cricket team. He is a right-handed middle order batsman and a right-arm medium bowler. Described as one of the most consistent batsmen, and by Indian cricketer Rahul Dravid as "a gritty player who did not throw away his wicket easily and is someone who valued his wicket", Waugh scored centuries (scores of 100 or more) in both Test and One Day International (ODI) matches organised by the International Cricket Council (ICC). During his career in international cricket he scored centuries on 35 occasions and half centuries on 95 occasions. Considered to be one of the greatest modern day cricket captains, Waugh led Australia to 41 wins out of the 57 Test matches under his captaincy. "He was named Cricketer of the Year in 1988 by Indian Cricket, and a year later by Wisden. In January 2010, the ICC inducted him into the ICC Cricket Hall of Fame.

Waugh made his Test debut against India in December 1985, and scored a century for the first time in a match against England in 1989 which Australia won. In Test matches, Waugh has scored centuries against all Test cricket playing nations, the second player to do so. (Note: Gary Kirsten was the first player to accomplish this feat.) He has scored a century in at least one cricket ground of all Test cricket playing nations, except Sri Lanka and Bangladesh. He has made scores of 150-plus in an innings on 14 occasions. His career best score of 200—his only double century—came against West Indies in April 1995. Waugh has been most successful against England, scoring ten centuries against them, the first in 1989 and the last one in 2003. On 25 July 2003 he became the first player to score 150 runs in an innings against all Test-playing nations, a world record. He has been dismissed eight times between scores of 90 and 99, with a further two innings not out in the 90s. As of August 2015, Waugh is ninth in the list of leading century makers in Test cricket.

Although he made his ODI debut in January 1986, it was not until 1996 that Waugh scored his first century, when he made 102 against Sri Lanka in a match which Australia lost. He went on to score centuries on two more occasions until the end of his career. His highest score of 120 came against South Africa during the 1999 Cricket World Cup; the innings ensured Australia's victory and earned him a Man of the match award. Having played for Australia for nineteen years, Waugh retired from international cricket after the final Test of the 2003–04 series against India.

== Key ==
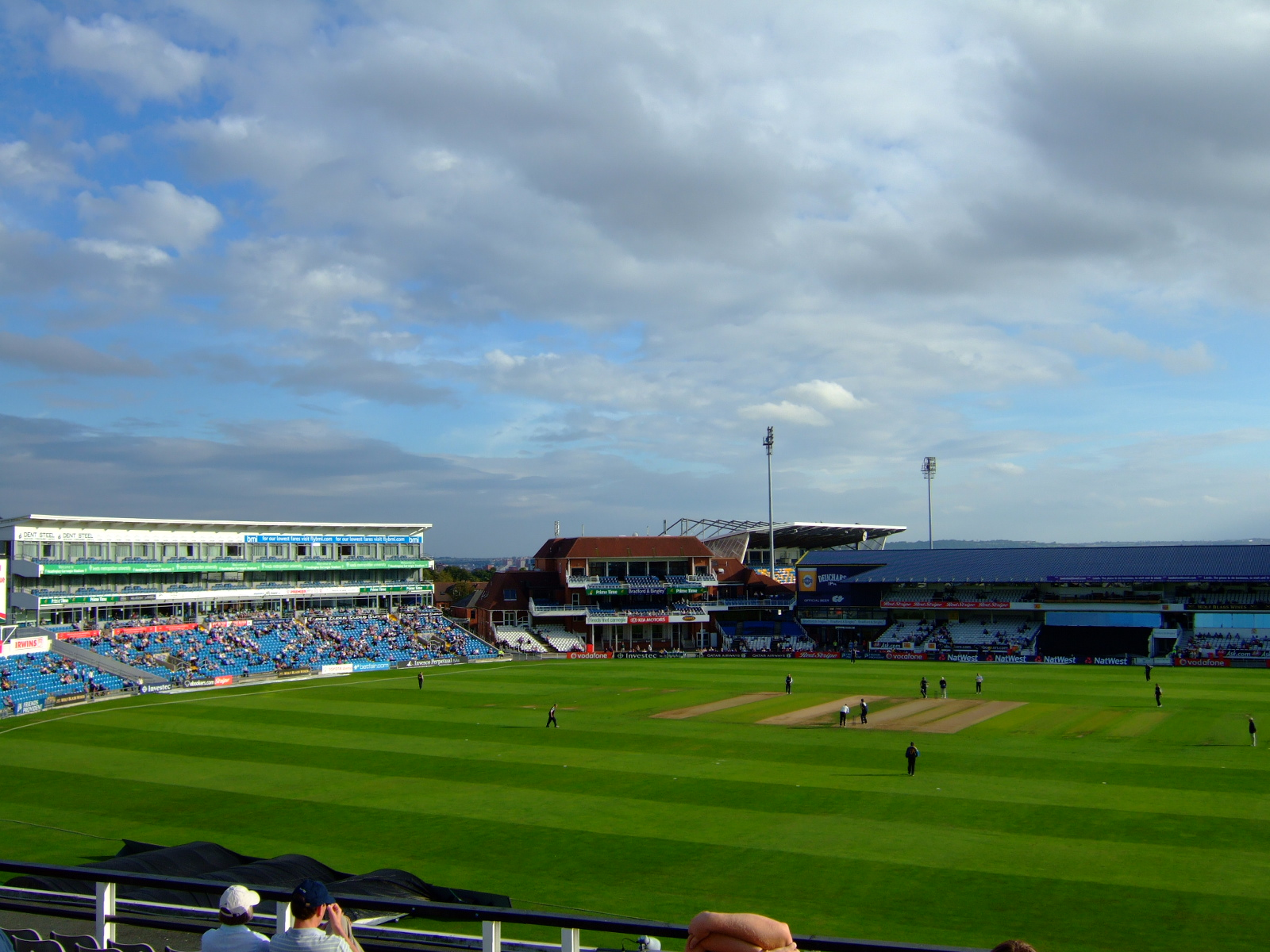
Headingley, Leeds, where Waugh scored his first hundred in Test cricket in 1989.

Key
| Symbol | Meaning |
|---|---|
| * | Remained not out |
| ‡ | Waugh was named "Man of the match". |
| † | Captained the Australian cricket team |
| Pos. | Position in the batting order |
| Inn. | The innings of the match |
| Test | The number of the Test match played in that series. |
| S/R. | Strike rate during the innings |
| H/A/N | Venue was at home (Australia), away or neutral |
| Date | Date the match was held, or the starting date of match for Test matches |
| Lost | The match was lost by Australia. |
| won | The match was won by Australia. |
| Drawn | The match was drawn. |

== Test cricket centuries ==
List of Test centuries scored by Steve Waugh
| No. | Score | Against | Pos. | Inn. | Test | Venue | H/A/N | Date | Result | Ref |
|---|---|---|---|---|---|---|---|---|---|---|
| 1 | 177* | England | 6 | 1 | 1/6 | Headingley, Leeds | Away | 8 June 1989 | Won | |
| 2 | 152* ‡ | England | 6 | 2 | 2/6 | Lord's Cricket Ground, London | Away | 22 June 1989 | Won | |
| 3 | 134* | Sri Lanka | 7 | 3 | 2/2 | Bellerive Oval, Hobart | Home | 16 December 1989 | Won | |
| 4 | 100 | West Indies | 3 | 1 | 3/5 | Sydney Cricket Ground, Sydney | Home | 2 January 1993 | Drawn | |
| 5 | 157* | England | 6 | 1 | 4/6 | Headingley, Leeds | Away | 22 July 1993 | Won | |
| 6 | 147* | New Zealand | 6 | 2 | 3/3 | Brisbane Cricket Ground, Brisbane | Home | 3 December 1993 | Won | |
| 7 | 164 ‡ | South Africa | 6 | 1 | 3/3 | Adelaide Oval, Adelaide | Home | 28 January 1994 | Won | |
| 8 | 200 ‡ | West Indies | 5 | 2 | 4/4 | Sabina Park, Kingston, Jamaica | Away | 29 April 1995 | Won | |
| 9 | 112* | Pakistan | 5 | 1 | 1/3 | Brisbane Cricket Ground, Brisbane | Home | 9 November 1995 | Won | |
| 10 | 131* | Sri Lanka | 5 | 1 | 2/3 | Melbourne Cricket Ground, Melbourne | Home | 26 December 1995 | Won | |
| 11 | 170 ‡ | Sri Lanka | 5 | 1 | 3/3 | Adelaide Oval, Adelaide | Home | 25 January 1996 | Won | |
| 12 | 160 ‡ | South Africa | 5 | 2 | 1/3 | New Wanderers Stadium, Johannesburg | Away | 28 February 1997 | Won | |
| 13 | 108 ‡ (Note: Waugh made centuries in both innings of the match.) | England | 5 | 1 | 3/6 | Old Trafford Cricket Ground, Manchester | Away | 3 July 1997 | Won | |
| 14 | 116 (Note: Waugh's second century in the match.) | England | 5 | 3 | 3/6 | Old Trafford Cricket Ground, Manchester | Away | 3 July 1997 | Won | |
| 15 | 157 ‡ | Pakistan | 5 | 2 | 1/3 | Rawalpindi Cricket Stadium, Rawalpindi | Away | 1 October 1998 | Won | |
| 16 | 112 | England | 5 | 1 | 1/5 | Brisbane Cricket Ground, Brisbane | Home | 20 November 1998 | Drawn | |
| 17 | 122* | England | 5 | 2 | 4/5 | Melbourne Cricket Ground, Melbourne | Home | 26 December 1998 | Lost | |
| 18 | 100 † | West Indies | 5 | 1 | 2/4 | Sabina Park, Kingston, Jamaica | Away | 13 March 1999 | Lost | |
| 19 | 199 † | West Indies | 5 | 1 | 3/4 | Kensington Oval, Bridgetown | Away | 26 March 1999 | Lost | |
| 20 | 151* ‡ † | Zimbabwe | 5 | 2 | 1/1 | Harare Sports Club, Harare | Away | 14 October 1999 | Won | |
| 21 | 150 ‡ † | India | 5 | 1 | 1/3 | Adelaide Oval, Adelaide | Home | 10 December 1999 | Won | |
| 22 | 151* † | New Zealand | 6 | 2 | 2/3 | Basin Reserve, Wellington | Away | 24 March 2000 | Won | |
| 23 | 121* ‡ † | West Indies | 5 | 1 | 4/5 | Melbourne Cricket Ground, Melbourne | Home | 26 December 2000 | Won | |
| 24 | 103 † | West Indies | 5 | 2 | 5/5 | Sydney Cricket Ground, Sydney | Home | 2 January 2001 | Won | |
| 25 | 110 † | India | 5 | 1 | 2/3 | Eden Gardens, Kolkata | Away | 11 March 2001 | Lost | |
| 26 | 105 † | England | 5 | 2 | 1/5 | Edgbaston Cricket Ground, Birmingham | Away | 5 July 2001 | won | |
| 27 | 157* † | England | 5 | 1 | 5/5 | Kennington Oval, London | Away | 23 August 2001 | Won | |
| 28 | 103* † | Pakistan | 5 | 1 | 3/3 | Sharjah Cricket Association Stadium, Sharjah | Neutral | 19 October 2002 | Won | |
| 29 | 102 † | England | 5 | 2 | 5/5 | Sydney Cricket Ground, Sydney | Home | 2 January 2003 | Lost | |
| 30 | 115 † | West Indies | 5 | 1 | 3/4 | Kensington Oval, Bridgetown | Away | 1 May 2003 | Won | |
| 31 | 100* ‡ † | Bangladesh | 5 | 2 | 1/2 | Marrara Oval, Darwin | Home | 18 July 2003 | Won | |
| 32 | 156* † | Bangladesh | 5 | 2 | 2/2 | Bundaberg Rum Stadium, Cairns | Home | 25 July 2003 | Won | |

== ODI cricket centuries ==
List of ODI centuries scored by Steve Waugh
| No. | Score | Against | Pos. | Inn. | S/R | Venue | H/A/N | Date | Result | Ref |
|---|---|---|---|---|---|---|---|---|---|---|
| 1 | 102* | Sri Lanka | 4 | 1 | 88.69 | Melbourne Cricket Ground, Melbourne | Home | 16 January 1996 | Lost | |
| 2 | 120* ‡ † | South Africa | 5 | 2 | 109.09 | Headingley, Leeds | Neutral | 13 June 1999 | Won | |
| 3 | 114* ‡ † | South Africa | 5 | 1 | 110.67 | Docklands Stadium, Melbourne | Home | 16 August 2000 | Won | |
