= List of international cricket centuries by Marcus Trescothick =

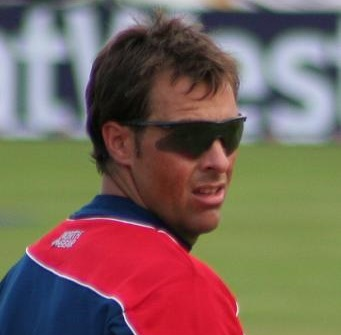
Marcus Trescothick has scored more centuries in One Day International cricket than any other English player.

Marcus Trescothick is an English cricketer and former opening batsman for the England national cricket team. He has scored centuries (100 or more runs) on 14 occasions in Test cricket and 12 times in One Day International (ODI) matches.

Trescothick's first Test century was scored against Sri Lanka at Galle International Stadium in 2001, when he made 122. He then continued to score at least one century every year until his retirement from international cricket in 2006. His highest score of 219 was made against South Africa in 2003 at The Oval, London—his only double century. He has made a century in both innings of a Test match on only one occasion, against the West Indies in 2004 at Edgbaston. Despite being the first batsman to achieve this feat at Edgbaston, Trescothick was not named Man of the Match, as Andrew Flintoff's first-innings of 167 earned him the accolade instead. During the 2005 series against Bangladesh, Trescothick scored centuries in both Test matches against the touring side, helping earn him a Man of the Series award. His 14 Test centuries have been scored at 11 grounds; nine were scored in England and the remaining five were scored at different venues. Trescothick has been dismissed twice between 90 and 99, against India in 2001 and Australia in 2005.

Trescothick's 12 ODI hundreds remained a record for an English player until Joe Root went past his tally in July 2018. Trescothick passed Graham Gooch's (the previous record-holder) tally when he scored 100 not out against Bangladesh in his 100th ODI in 2005. This was also the fastest of his career, off 76 balls, the third fastest ODI century for an English batsman. Trescothick made his first ODI century against Pakistan, scoring a career-best 137. His century the following year against India in the final of the 2002 NatWest Series, along with two fifties earlier in the competition, saw him named Man of the Series. He was again named Man of the Series in the 2003 NatWest Challenge, finishing the three-match series with a century, a fifty and more than twice as many runs as any other player. Only six days later, captaining his side against South Africa, Trescothick scored another century and, alongside fellow opener Vikram Solanki, set an English record first wicket partnership of 200. His ODI hundreds have been made against 10 different opponents, on seven different grounds. Six of his centuries have been scored in London, equally split between The Oval and Lord's.

After scoring four Test centuries and two ODI centuries in 2004, Trescothick was named as one of the Wisden Cricketers of the Year in 2005. Between the two formats (Test and ODI), Trescothick has scored a century against every opponent he has played except Namibia and Netherlands, each of which he only faced in one ODI. Trescothick did not score a century in any of his three Twenty20 Internationals; his highest score was the 72 he scored against Sri Lanka in 2006.

== Key ==
- * denotes that he remained not out.
- ‡ denotes that he was the captain of the English team in that match.
- Pos. denotes his position in the batting order.
- Test denotes the number of the Test match played in that series.
- Inn. denotes the number of innings in the match.
- H/A/N denotes whether the venue is home (England), away (opposition's home) or neutral.
- Lost denotes that the match was lost by England.
- Won denotes that the match was won by England.
- S/R denotes strike rate.

== Test centuries ==
No.	Score	Against	Pos.	Inn.	Test	Venue	H/A	Date	Result
1	122	Sri Lanka	2	2	1/3	Galle International Stadium, Galle	Away	22 February 2001	Lost
2	117	Pakistan	2	4	2/2	Old Trafford, Manchester	Home	31 May 2001	Lost
3	161	Sri Lanka	1	2	2/3	Edgbaston, Birmingham	Home	30 May 2002	Won
4	219	South Africa	1	2	5/5	The Oval, London	Home	4 September 2003	Won
5	113	Bangladesh	1	2	1/2	Bangabandhu National Stadium, Dhaka	Away	21 October 2003	Won
6	132	New Zealand	1	2	2/3	Headingley, Leeds	Home	3 June 2004	Won
7	105	West Indies	1	1	2/4	Edgbaston, Birmingham	Home	29 July 2004	Won
8	107	West Indies	1	3	2/4	Edgbaston, Birmingham	Home	29 July 2004	Won
9	132	South Africa	1	3	2/5	Kingsmead, Durban	Away	26 December 2004	Draw
10	180	South Africa	1	3	4/5	Wanderers Stadium, Johannesburg	Away	13 January 2005	Won
11	194	Bangladesh	1	2	1/2	Lord's, London	Home	26 May 2005	Won
12	151	Bangladesh	1	2	2/2	Riverside, Chester-le-Street	Home	3 June 2005	Won
13	193 ‡	Pakistan	1	2	1/3	Multan Cricket Stadium, Multan	Away	12 November 2005	Lost
14	106	Sri Lanka	1	1	1/3	Lord's, London	Home	11 May 2006	Draw

== ODI centuries ==
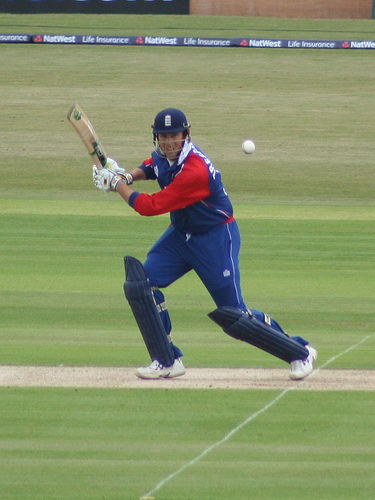
Trescothick batting for England against Sri Lanka in 2006

No.	Score	Against	Pos.	Inn.	S/R	Venue	H/A/N	Date	Result
1	137	Pakistan	1	2	96.47	Lord's, London	Home	12 June 2001	Lost
2	121	India	1	2	111.00	Eden Gardens, Kolkata	Away	19 January 2002	Lost
3	109	India	1	1	109.00	Lord's, London	Home	13 July 2002	Lost
4	119	Zimbabwe	1	1	116.66	R. Premadasa Stadium, Colombo	Neutral	18 September 2002	Won
5	108*	Pakistan	1	2	74.48	Lord's, London	Home	22 June 2003	Won
6	114* ‡	South Africa	1	2	91.20	The Oval, London	Home	28 June 2003	Won
7	130	West Indies	1	1	94.20	Beausejour Stadium, Gros Islet	Away	1 May 2004	Lost
8	104	West Indies	1	1	83.87	The Oval, London	Home	25 September 2004	Lost
9	100*	Bangladesh	1	2	131.57	The Oval, London	Home	16 June 2005	Won
10	104*	Australia	1	2	77.61	Headingley, Leeds	Home	7 July 2005	Won
11	113	Ireland	1	1	99.12	Civil Service Cricket Club Ground, Belfast	Away	16 June 2006	Won
12	121	Sri Lanka	1	1	102.54	Headingley, Leeds	Home	1 July 2006	Lost
