= List of international cricket centuries by Babar Azam =

Babar Azam is a Pakistani cricketer. As of 15 November 2025, he has played 61 Tests, 138 One Day Internationals (ODIs), and 131 Twenty20 Internationals (T20Is) for Pakistan. He has scored centuries (100 or more runs in an innings) on 32 occasions, scoring 9 centuries in Tests, 20 in ODIs, and 3 in T20Is. In 2022, Babar Azam became the Pakistan batter with the most runs — 2,598 — in all formats of the game in a calendar year.

He has been named in the ICC Men's ODI Team of the Year on three occasions, captaining it in 2021 and in 2022. In 2021 he also captained the ICC Men's T20I Team of the Year. He was also captain of the 2021 ICC Men's T20 World Cup Team of the Tournament.

Azam made his Test debut in October 2016, and scored his first century two years later when he scored 127* against New Zealand at Dubai. His highest Test score of 196 came against Australia in March 2022; his innings included the highest-ever score by a captain in the fourth innings of a match and the second-longest innings by a batter in the fourth innings of a Test. (Note: The record for the longest innings is held by Michael Atherton.) Azam has scored Test centuries against five different opponents at five grounds, including three at grounds outside Pakistan.

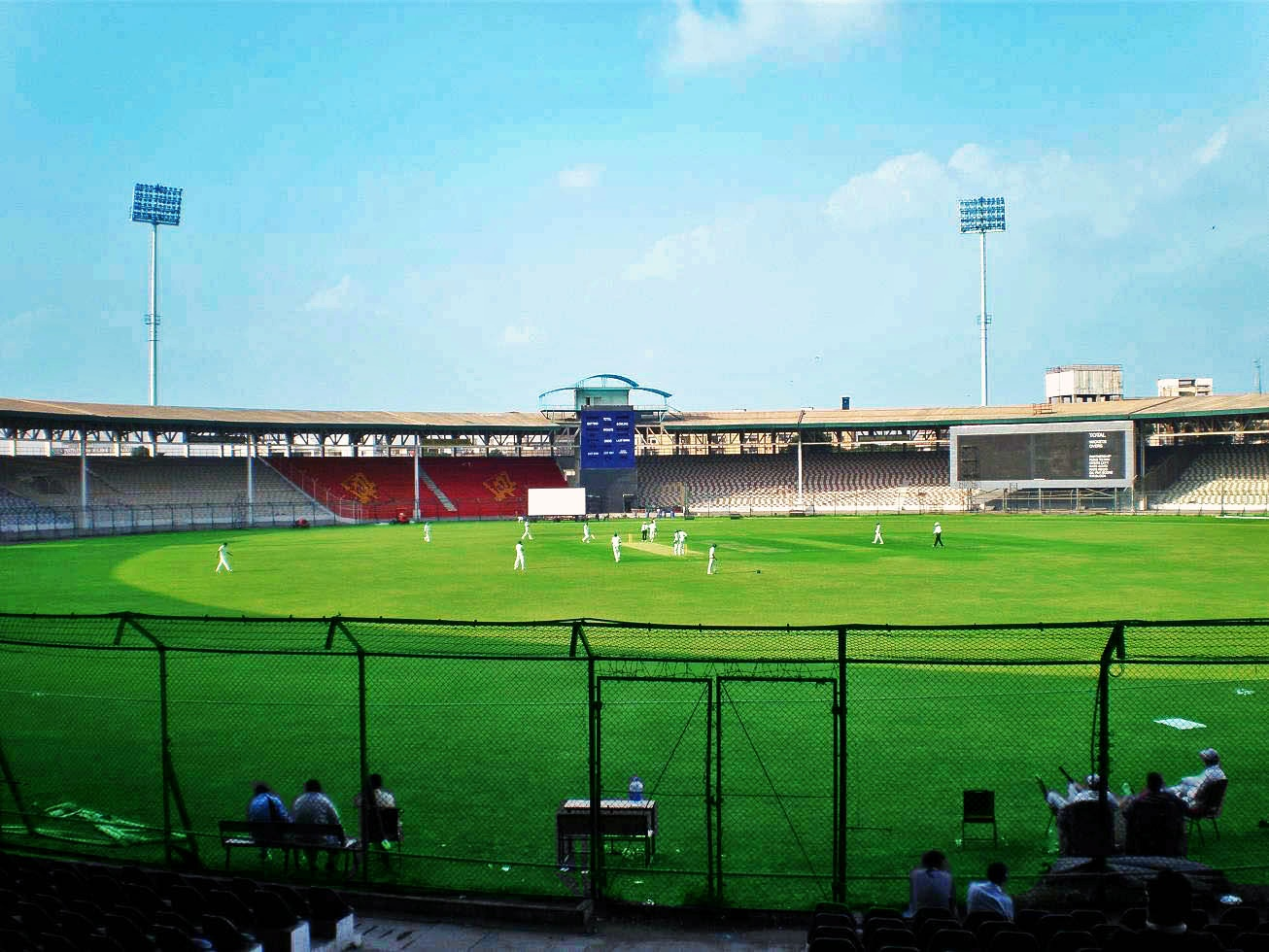
National Stadium, Karachi, where Babar has scored centuries in all three formats of the game.

Azam made his ODI debut in May 2015 and scored his first century in the format a year later in 2016, making 120 against the West Indies. This was followed by scores of 123 and 117, making him the third Pakistani batsman and eighth batsman overall to score three consecutive ODI hundreds. In 2022, he scored three consecutive ODI hundreds again, with two centuries against Australia and one against the West Indies, making him the first and so-far the only batter to do this on two occasions. His highest ODI score of 158 was made against England in July 2021. His ODI centuries, which were scored at thirteen venues, have come against seven different opponents. He became the fastest batsman to complete 5,000 one-day international runs during the fourth match against New Zealand in Karachi. In August 2023, he became the batsman to have scored the most runs after the first 100 ODI innings.

He made his T20I debut in September 2016 and has scored three centuries in the format, with the first one coming against South Africa at Centurion. His second century came against England at Karachi in September 2022, making him the only Pakistani to score more than one T20I century. His third century came on 15 April 2023 against New Zealand where he scored 101* on 58 balls, becoming the first player to score three T20I centuries as captain.

== Key ==
Symbol	Meaning
*	Remained not out
†	Man of the match
‡	Captained the Pakistan cricket team
Pos.	Position in the batting order
Inn.	The innings of the match
Test	The number of the Test match played in that series
S/R	Strike rate during the innings
H/A/N	Venue was at home (Pakistan), away, or neutral
Date	Date the match was held, or the starting date of match for Test matches
Lost	The match was lost by Pakistan.
Won	The match was won by Pakistan.
Drawn	The match was drawn.
(D/L)	The result was determined by the Duckworth–Lewis method.

== Test centuries ==
Test centuries scored by Azam
No.	Score	Against	Pos.	Inn.	Test	Venue	H/A/N	Date	Result	Ref
1	127*	New Zealand	6	1	2/3	Dubai International Cricket Stadium, Dubai	Neutral	24 November 2018	Won	
2	104	Australia	5	3	1/2	The Gabba, Brisbane	Away	21 November 2019	Lost	
3	102*	Sri Lanka	4	2	1/2	Rawalpindi Cricket Stadium, Rawalpindi	Home	11 December 2019	Drawn	
4	100*	Sri Lanka	4	3	2/2	National Stadium, Karachi	Home	19 December 2019	Won	
5	143	Bangladesh	4	2	1/2	Rawalpindi Cricket Stadium, Rawalpindi	Home	7 February 2020	Won	
6	196 † ‡	Australia	4	4	2/3	National Stadium, Karachi	Home	12 March 2022	Drawn	
7	119 ‡	Sri Lanka	4	1	1/2	Galle International Stadium, Galle	Away	16 July 2022	Won	
8	136 ‡	England	4	2	1/3	Rawalpindi Cricket Stadium, Rawalpindi	Home	1 December 2022	Lost	
9	161 ‡	New Zealand	4	1	1/2	National Bank Cricket Arena, Karachi	Home	26 December 2022	Drawn	

== One Day International centuries ==
ODI centuries scored by Azam
No.	Score	Against	Pos.	Inn.	S/R	Venue	H/A/N	Date	Result	Ref
1	120 †	West Indies	3	1	91.60	Sharjah Cricket Stadium, Sharjah	Neutral	30 September 2016	Won (D/L)	
2	123 †	West Indies	3	1	97.62	Sharjah Cricket Stadium, Sharjah	Neutral	2 October 2016	Won	
3	117 †	West Indies	3	1	110.38	Sheikh Zayed Cricket Stadium, Abu Dhabi	Neutral	5 October 2016	Won	
4	100	Australia	3	2	91.74	Adelaide Oval, Adelaide	Away	26 January 2017	Lost	
5	125* †	West Indies	3	1	94.70	Providence Stadium, Providence	Away	9 April 2017	Won	
6	103	Sri Lanka	3	1	78.63	Dubai International Cricket Stadium, Dubai	Neutral	13 October 2017	Won	
7	101	Sri Lanka	3	1	75.94	Sheikh Zayed Cricket Stadium, Abu Dhabi	Neutral	16 October 2017	Won	
8	106* †	Zimbabwe	3	1	139.47	Queens Sports Club, Bulawayo	Away	22 July 2018	Won	
9	115	England	3	1	102.68	Trent Bridge, Nottingham	Away	17 May 2019	Lost	
10	101* †	New Zealand	3	2	80.16	Edgbaston, Birmingham	Neutral	26 June 2019	Won	
11	115	Sri Lanka	3	1	109.52	National Stadium, Karachi	Home	30 September 2019	Won	
12	125 ‡	Zimbabwe	3	2	100.00	Rawalpindi Cricket Stadium, Rawalpindi	Home	3 November 2020	Tied	
13	103 † ‡	South Africa	3	2	99.03	Centurion Park, Centurion	Away	2 April 2021	Won	
14	158 ‡	England	3	1	113.66	Edgbaston, Birmingham	Away	13 July 2021	Lost	
15	114 † ‡	Australia	3	2	137.34	Gaddafi Stadium, Lahore	Home	31 March 2022	Won	
16	105* † ‡	Australia	3	2	91.30	Gaddafi Stadium, Lahore	Home	2 April 2022	Won	
17	103 ‡	West Indies	3	2	96.26	Multan Cricket Stadium, Multan	Home	8 June 2022	Won	
18	107 † ‡	New Zealand	3	1	91.45	National Stadium, Karachi	Home	5 May 2023	Won	
19	151 † ‡	Nepal	3	1	115.27	Multan Cricket Stadium, Multan	Home	30 August 2023	Won	
20	102* †	Sri Lanka	3	2	85.71	Rawalpindi Cricket Stadium, Rawalpindi	Home	14 November 2025	Won	

== T20I centuries ==
T20I centuries scored by Azam
No.	Score	Against	Pos.	Inn.	S/R	Venue	H/A/N	Date	Result	Ref
1	122 † ‡	South Africa	1	2	206.77	Centurion Park, Centurion	Away	14 April 2021	Won	
2	110* † ‡	England	2	2	166.66	National Stadium, Karachi	Home	22 September 2022	Won	
3	101* † ‡	New Zealand	2	1	174.13	Gaddafi Stadium, Lahore	Home	15 April 2023	Won	
