= List of international cricket centuries by Mark Waugh =

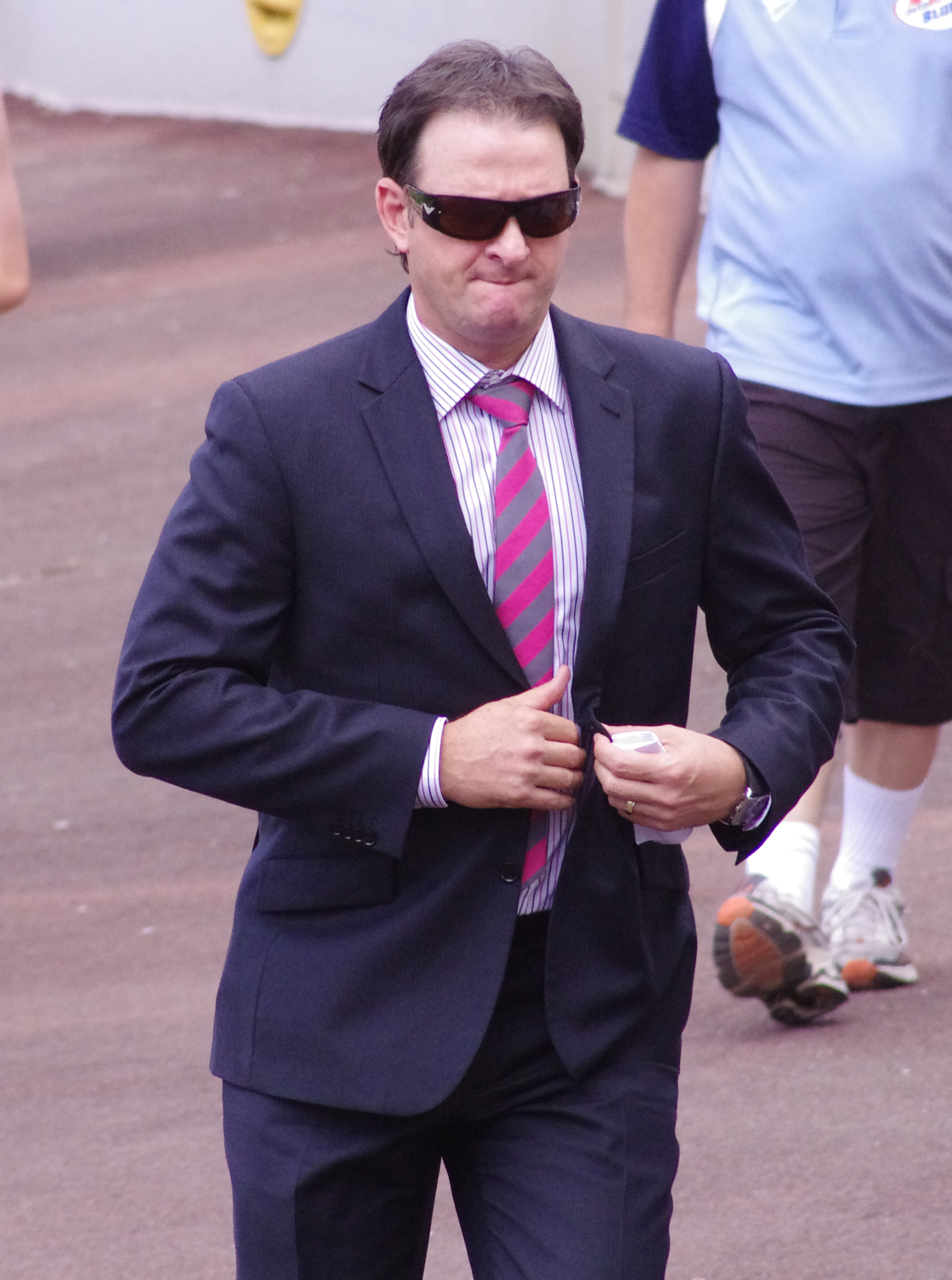
Mark Waugh holds the record for the third-highest number of international centuries for Australia.

Mark Waugh is a former Australian cricketer who scored centuries (100 or more runs) in Test and One Day International (ODI) matches organised by the International Cricket Council (ICC). Described by Cricinfo writer John Polack as "one of the world's most elegant and gifted strokemakers", he played most of his career under the captaincy of his older twin-brother Steve Waugh. Waugh represented Australia in 128 Test matches and 244 ODIs between 1988 and 2002, scoring 20 and 18 centuries respectively. He was primarily a batsman who played as an opener in ODIs, while normally at number four in Tests.

Waugh made his Test debut against England at the Adelaide Oval in January 1991, scoring a century; he became the fifteenth player from Australia to score a hundred on debut when he made 138 in the innings. He ended the season with one more century, aggregating 554 runs at an average of 61.55. Following his performances, Wisden Cricketers' Almanack named him as one of their five Cricketers of the Year the same year. Waugh was instrumental in Australia's victory in the 1995 Frank Worrell Trophy against the West Indies when he made 126 in the deciding game. His highest score of 153 not out was achieved against India during the third Test of the 1998 Border–Gavaskar Trophy in Bangalore. In Tests, Waugh was most successful against England scoring six centuries. As of September 2026, his position is eleventh in the list of Test century-makers for Australia.

Although Waugh made his ODI debut against Pakistan in December 1988, he did not score his first century until four years later. Between his debut and the 1996 World Cup he made five centuries, all against different opponents. Waugh was more prolific at the 1996 World Cup scoring three centuries. (Note: Only two other players – Sourav Ganguly and Matthew Hayden – have scored three centuries in a single World Cup tournament.) Waugh set the record for the highest individual score by an Australian when he made 173 against the West Indies at the Melbourne Cricket Ground in February 2001. (Note: The total has since then been surpassed by five Australian players – Matthew Hayden (181*), Shane Watson (185*), David Warner (178) & (179), Glenn Maxwell (201*) and Mitch Marsh (177*).) The following month he scored a match-winning 133 not out against India at Nehru Stadium in Pune which also became his last century in the format. Despite a slow start to his ODI career, he became the third highest century-maker in ODIs at the time of scoring his last century. (Note: Only Sachin Tendulkar (26) and Saeed Anwar (19) were ahead of Waugh at the time. As of September 2026, Waugh's position is twentieth in the overall ODI list, and third in the equivalent list for Australia.)

== Key ==
- * – Remained not out
- † – Man of the match

== Test centuries ==
Test centuries scored by Mark Waugh
| No. | Score | Against | Pos. | Inn. | Test | Venue | H/A | Date | Result | Ref |
|---|---|---|---|---|---|---|---|---|---|---|
| 1 | 138 | England | 6 | 1 | 4/5 | Adelaide Oval, Adelaide | Home | 25 January 1991 | Draw | |
| 2 | 139* | West Indies | 6 | 1 | 5/5 | Antigua Recreation Ground, St. John's | Away | 27 April 1991 | Won | |
| 3 | 112 | West Indies | 4 | 1 | 2/5 | Melbourne Cricket Ground, Melbourne | Home | 27 December 1992 | Won | |
| 4 | 137 † | England | 4 | 2 | 5/6 | Edgbaston Cricket Ground, Birmingham | Away | 6 August 1993 | Won | |
| 5 | 111 † | New Zealand | 4 | 1 | 2/3 | Bellerive Oval, Hobart | Home | 27 November 1993 | Won | |
| 6 | 113* † | South Africa | 5 | 3 | 3/3 | Kingsmead Cricket Ground, Durban | Away | 29 March 1994 | Draw | |
| 7 | 140 | England | 4 | 1 | 1/5 | The Gabba, Brisbane | Home | 26 November 1994 | Won | |
| 8 | 126 | West Indies | 4 | 2 | 4/4 | Sabina Park, Kingston | Away | 30 April 1995 | Won | |
| 9 | 116 | Pakistan | 4 | 2 | 3/3 | Sydney Cricket Ground, Sydney | Home | 2 December 1995 | Lost | |
| 10 | 111 | Sri Lanka | 4 | 2 | 1/3 | WACA Ground, Perth | Home | 10 December 1995 | Won | |
| 11 | 116 † | South Africa | 4 | 4 | 2/3 | St George's Oval, Port Elizabeth | Away | 17 March 1997 | Won | |
| 12 | 100 | South Africa | 4 | 2 | 2/3 | Sydney Cricket Ground, Sydney | Home | 4 January 1998 | Won | |
| 13 | 115* | South Africa | 4 | 4 | 3/3 | Adelaide Oval, Adelaide | Home | 3 February 1998 | Draw | |
| 14 | 153* | India | 4 | 2 | 3/3 | M. Chinnaswamy Stadium, Bangalore | Away | 27 March 1998 | Won | |
| 15 | 117 | Pakistan | 4 | 3 | 3/3 | National Stadium, Karachi | Away | 25 October 1998 | Draw | |
| 16 | 121 | England | 4 | 1 | 5/5 | Sydney Cricket Ground, Sydney | Home | 2 January 1999 | Won | |
| 17 | 100 | Pakistan | 4 | 2 | 1/3 | The Gabba, Brisbane | Home | 7 November 1999 | Won | |
| 18 | 119 † | West Indies | 5 | 2 | 2/5 | WACA Ground, Perth | Home | 2 December 2000 | Won | |
| 19 | 108 | England | 4 | 2 | 2/5 | Lord's Cricket Ground, London | Away | 20 July 2001 | Won | |
| 20 | 120 | England | 4 | 1 | 5/5 | The Oval, London | Away | 24 August 2001 | Won | |

== ODI centuries ==
ODI centuries scored by Mark Waugh
| No. | Score | Against | Pos. | Inn. | S/R | Venue | H/A/N | Date | Result | Ref |
|---|---|---|---|---|---|---|---|---|---|---|
| 1 | 108 | New Zealand | 2 | 1 | 82.44 | Seddon Park, Hamilton | Away | 27 March 1993 | Lost | |
| 2 | 113 | England | 3 | 2 | 92.62 | Edgbaston Cricket Ground, Birmingham | Away | 21 May 1993 | Won | |
| 3 | 107 | South Africa | 4 | 1 | 96.39 | Sydney Cricket Ground, Sydney | Home | 23 January 1994 | Won | |
| 4 | 121* | Pakistan | 3 | 1 | 90.29 | Rawalpindi Cricket Stadium, Rawalpindi | Away | 22 October 1994 | Lost | |
| 5 | 130 † | Sri Lanka | 2 | 1 | 90.27 | WACA Ground, Perth | Home | 12 January 1996 | Won | |
| 6 | 130 † | Kenya | 2 | 1 | 101.56 | Indira Priyadarshini Stadium, Visakhapatnam | Neutral | 23 February 1996 | Won | |
| 7 | 126 † | India | 1 | 1 | 93.33 | Wankhede Stadium, Mumbai | Away | 27 February 1996 | Won | |
| 8 | 110 † | New Zealand | 2 | 2 | 98.21 | M. A. Chidambaram Stadium, Chennai | Neutral | 11 March 1996 | Won | |
| 9 | 102 | West Indies | 1 | 1 | 89.47 | The Gabba, Brisbane | Home | 5 January 1997 | Lost | |
| 10 | 115* † | South Africa | 1 | 2 | 92.00 | St George's Oval, Port Elizabeth | Away | 31 March 1997 | Won | |
| 11 | 104 † | New Zealand | 1 | 2 | 92.03 | Adelaide Oval, Adelaide | Home | 7 December 1997 | Won | |
| 12 | 104 | Zimbabwe | 2 | 1 | 86.66 | Lord's Cricket Ground, London | Neutral | 9 June 1999 | Won | |
| 13 | 106 † | Zimbabwe | 1 | 1 | 109.27 | Queens Sports Club, Bulawayo | Away | 21 October 1999 | Won | |
| 14 | 116 † | India | 2 | 1 | 88.54 | Adelaide Oval, Adelaide | Home | 26 January 2000 | Won | |
| 15 | 112* † | West Indies | 2 | 2 | 87.50 | The Gabba, Brisbane | Home | 14 January 2001 | Won | |
| 16 | 102* | Zimbabwe | 2 | 2 | 90.26 | Bellerive Oval, Hobart | Home | 30 January 2001 | Won | |
| 17 | 173 † | West Indies | 2 | 1 | 116.89 | Melbourne Cricket Ground, Melbourne | Home | 9 February 2001 | Won | |
| 18 | 133* † | India | 1 | 2 | 96.37 | Nehru Stadium, Pune | Away | 28 March 2001 | Won | |
