= List of international cricket centuries by Tom Latham =

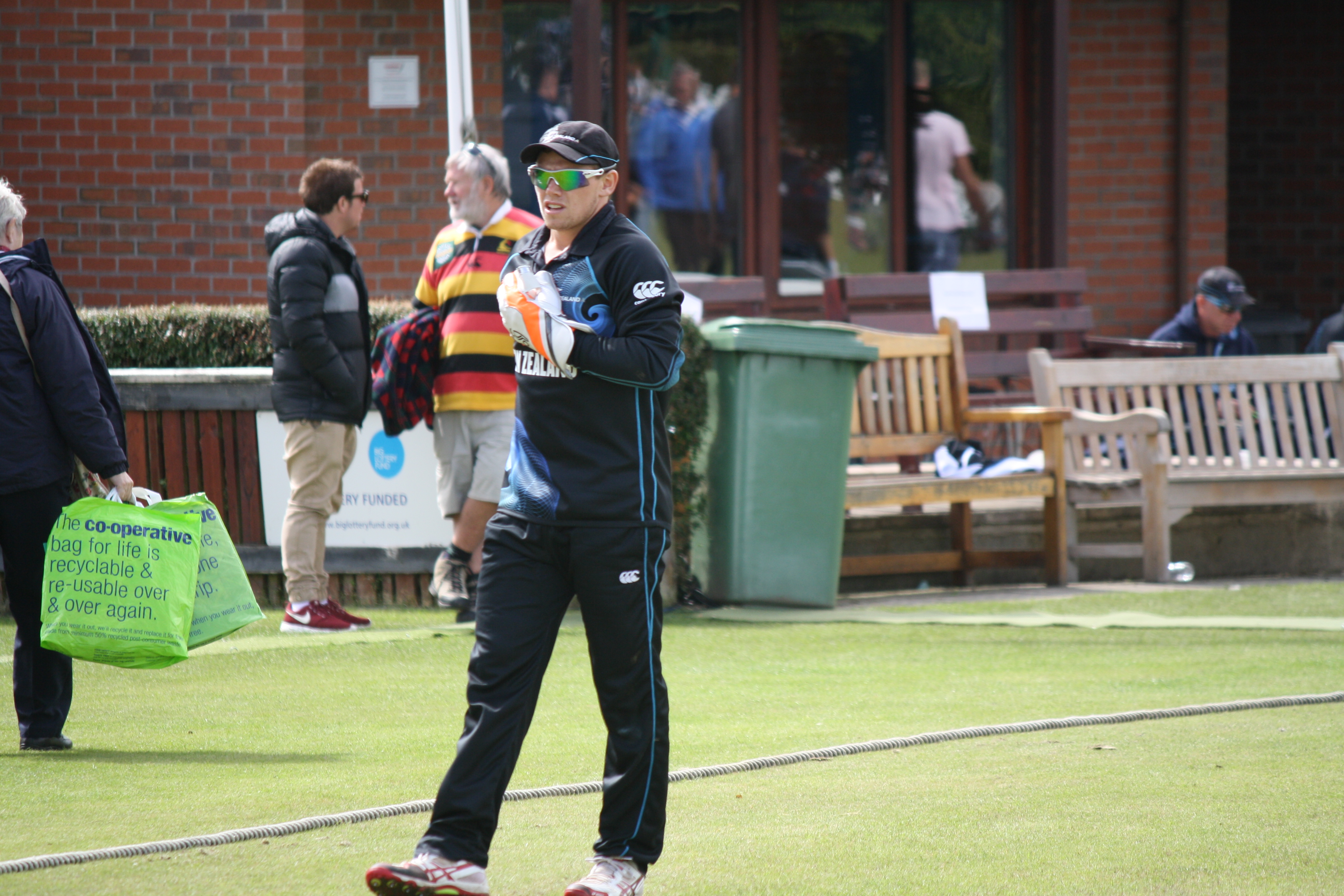
Latham wicket-keeping against Scotland in August 2014

Tom Latham is an international cricketer who represents the New Zealand national cricket team. He made his ODI debut in February 2012 against Zimbabwe at University of Otago Oval, Dunedin. and Test debut against India at the Basin Reserve, Wellington in February 2014.

On 9 November 2014, Latham scored his first international century against Pakistan in a test match played at Sheikh Zayed Stadium, which was the second highest score in the match and the only century scored by a New Zealander.

He has scored 17 centuries (100 or more runs in a single innings) in Test and 8 in One Day International (ODI) matches. His highest Test score of 264* came against Sri Lanka at the Basin Reserve, Wellington in December 2018. Latham His highest score of 137 came against Bangladesh at Hagley Oval, Christchurch in December 2016. He has not scored any century in Twenty20 International (T20I) matches.

== Key ==
* – Remained not out
‡ – Captain of New Zealand in that match
† – Man of the match

== Test centuries ==
List of Test centuries scored by Latham
No.	Score	Against	Pos.	Inn.	Test	Venue	H/A/N	Date	Result	Ref
1	103	Pakistan	1	2	1/3	Sheikh Zayed Stadium, Abu Dhabi	Neutral	9 November 2014	Lost	
2	137	Pakistan	1	1	2/3	Dubai International Stadium, Dubai	Neutral	17 November 2014	Drawn	
3	109*	Sri Lanka	1	3	1/2	University of Otago Oval, Dunedin	Home	10 December 2015	Won	
4	105	Zimbabwe	2	2	1/2	Queens Sports Club, Bulawayo	Away	28 July 2016	Won	
5	136	Zimbabwe	2	1	2/2	Queens Sports Club, Bulawayo	Away	6 August 2016	Won	
6	177 †	Bangladesh	2	2	1/2	Basin Reserve, Wellington	Home	12 January 2017	Won	
7	264* †	Sri Lanka	2	2	1/2	Basin Reserve, Wellington	Home	15 December 2018	Drawn	
8	176	Sri Lanka	2	3	2/2	Hagley Oval, Christchurch	Home	26 December 2018	Won	
9	161	Bangladesh	2	2	1/2	Seddon Park, Hamilton	Home	28 February 2019	Won	
10	154 †	Sri Lanka	2	2	2/2	Paikiasothy Saravanamuttu Stadium, Colombo	Away	22 August 2019	Won	
11	105	England	2	1	2/2	Seddon Park, Hamilton	Home	29 November 2019	Drawn	
12	252 †	Bangladesh	1	1	2/2	Hagley Oval, Christchurch	Home	9 January 2022	Won	
13	113	Pakistan	1	2	1/2	National Bank Cricket Arena, Karachi	Home	26 December 2022	Drawn	
14	145 ‡	West Indies	1	3	1/3	Hagley Oval, Christchurch	Home	2 December 2025	Drawn	
15	137 ‡	West Indies	1	1	3/3	Bay Oval, Mount Maunganui	Home	18 December 2025	Won	
16	101 ‡	West Indies	1	3	3/3	Bay Oval, Mount Maunganui	Home	18 December 2025	Won	
17	151 ‡	England	1	1	3/3	Trent Bridge, Nottingham	Away	25 June 2026	Won	

== One Day International centuries ==
ODI centuries scored by Latham
No.	Score	Against	Pos.	Inn.	S/R	Venue	H/A/N	Date	Result	Ref
1	110*	Zimbabwe	2	2	94.83	Harare Sports Club, Harare	Away	4 August 2015	Won	
2	137 †	Bangladesh	2	1	113.22	Hagley Oval, Christchurch	Home	26 December 2016	Won	
3	104 † ‡	Ireland	2	1	93.69	Malahide Cricket Club Ground, Malahide	Away	21 May 2017	Won	
4	103* †	India	5	2	100.98	Wankhede Stadium, Mumbai	Away	22 October 2017	Won	
5	110* † ‡	Bangladesh	5	2	101.85	Hagley Oval, Christchurch	Home	23 March 2021	Won	
6	140* † ‡	Netherlands	5	1	113.82	Seddon Park, Hamilton	Home	2 April 2022	Won	
7	145* †	India	5	2	139.42	Eden Park, Auckland	Home	25 November 2022	Won	
8	118* †	Pakistan	5	1	113.46	National Stadium, Karachi	Away	19 February 2025	Won	
