= List of international cricket centuries by Andrew Strauss =

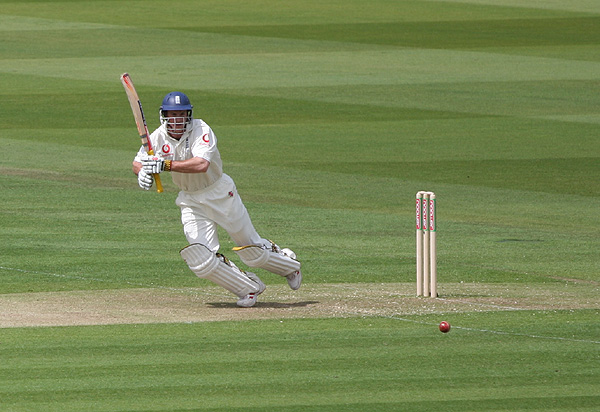
Strauss batting against Bangladesh at Lord's in 2005.

Andrew Strauss is an English cricketer, who plays as an opening batsman. He has captained the England cricket team in Test and One Day International cricket since 2009. He has scored centuries (100 or more runs in a single innings) on twenty-one occasions in Test cricket, and six times in One Day International (ODI) matches. In 2005, he was named as a Wisden Cricketer of the Year for his performances the previous year, in which he made his debut and, according to Wisden's Jon Henderson, advanced "from tyro to stalwart". He was appointed as a Member of the Order of the British Empire (MBE) in 2006 as part of England's 2005 Ashes winning squad. Five years later, he was again honoured for his Ashes achievements and was made an Officer of the Order of the British Empire (OBE) for his role as captain during the 2010–11 Ashes series.

Strauss made his Test cricket debut at the age of 27 after being called into the team to replace the injured Michael Vaughan. He scored a century in the first innings of the match, played against New Zealand at Lord's, his county home ground for Middlesex. In the second innings of the match he missed out on becoming the first England batsman to score centuries in both innings of his Test debut when he was run out on 83. His second Test century came in the first match of the series against the West Indies two months later, and was also scored at Lord's. The following English winter, Strauss scored three centuries during the Test series in South Africa, earning him the man of the series accolade, and high praise from Allan Donald, who said he had "never seen any visiting player bat as well, with so many match-winning performances". In 2008, he passed 150 for the first time in Test cricket, scoring 177 against New Zealand at McLean Park, Napier. The innings, his highest in Test cricket, is also the only time he has scored a Test century when not playing as an opening batsman for England. Strauss was named as England captain in 2009, and responded by passing 140 four times during the year, hitting centuries in three subsequent Tests against the West Indies, and scoring his highest total during an Ashes series against Australia, reaching 161 at Lord's. After a series of low scores, Strauss scored a century against the West Indies in the first match of the 2012 series, his first in a year and a half.

In ODI cricket, Strauss has scored six centuries during his career, the first of which came against the West Indies in 2004 at Lord's. He scored his second century the following season, reaching 152 against Bangladesh, at the time the third-highest total by an England batsman in ODIs. Strauss was dropped from the ODI side after the 2007 World Cup, but returned in 2009 when he was named as the national captain. He scored a patient century against the West Indies in the same year, but England's success without him at the 2010 World Twenty20 led to questions about whether his batting temperament was suited to one-day cricket. Over the subsequent year, Strauss scored three centuries, twice surpassing his previous highest total. He scored 154 against Bangladesh, and during the 2011 World Cup reached 158 during a tied match against India. His three scores in excess of 150 are all among the highest five by England batsmen in ODI cricket.

== Key ==
- * denotes that he remained not out.
- ‡ denotes that he was the captain of the England team in that match.
- ^{M} denotes that he was named man of the match.
- Pos. denotes his position in the batting order.
- Test denotes the number of the Test match played in that series (for example, (1/3) denotes the first Test in a three match series).
- Inn. denotes in which innings of the match he scored his century.
- H/A/N denotes whether the venue is home (England), away (opposition's home) or neutral.
- Date denotes the date on which the match began.
- Lost denotes that the match was lost by England.
- Won denotes that the match was won by England.
- Drawn denotes that the match was drawn.
- Tied denotes that the match was tied.
- S/R denotes strike rate.

== Test centuries ==
No.	Score	Against	Pos.	Inn.	Test	Venue	H/A/N	Date	Result
1	112 ^{M}	New Zealand	2	2	1/3	Lord's, London	Home	20 May 2004	Won
2	137	West Indies	2	1	1/4	Lord's, London	Home	22 July 2004	Won
3	126 ^{M}	South Africa	2	2	1/5	St George's Park, Port Elizabeth	Away	17 December 2004	Won
4	136	South Africa	2	3	2/5	Kingsmead, Durban	Away	26 December 2004	Drawn
5	147	South Africa	2	1	4/5	Wanderers Stadium, Johannesburg	Away	13 January 2005	Won
6	106	Australia	2	3	3/5	Old Trafford, Manchester	Home	11 August 2005	Drawn
7	129	Australia	2	1	5/5	The Oval, London	Home	8 September 2005	Drawn
8	128	India	1	1	3/3	Wankhede Stadium, Mumbai	Away	18 March 2006	Won
9	128 ‡	Pakistan	2	3	1/4	Lord's, London	Home	13 July 2006	Drawn
10	116 ‡	Pakistan	2	3	3/4	Headingley, Leeds	Home	4 August 2006	Won
11	177	New Zealand	3	3	3/3	McLean Park, Napier	Away	22 March 2008	Won
12	106	New Zealand	1	4	2/3	Old Trafford, Manchester	Home	23 May 2008	Won
13	123	India	1	1	1/2	M. A. Chidambaram Stadium, Chennai	Away	11 December 2008	Lost
14	108	India	1	3	1/2	M. A. Chidambaram Stadium, Chennai	Away	11 December 2008	Lost
15	169 ‡	West Indies	1	1	3/5	Antigua Recreation Ground, St. John's	Away	15 February 2009	Drawn
16	142 ‡	West Indies	1	1	4/5	Kensington Oval, Bridgetown	Away	26 February 2009	Drawn
17	142 ‡	West Indies	1	1	5/5	Queen's Park Oval, Port of Spain	Away	6 March 2009	Drawn
18	161 ‡	Australia	1	1	2/5	Lord's, London	Home	16 July 2009	Won
19	110 ‡	Australia	1	3	1/5	Brisbane Cricket Ground, Brisbane	Away	25 November 2010	Drawn
20	122 ‡	West Indies	1	2	1/3	Lord's, London	Home	17 May 2012	Won
21	141 ‡	West Indies	1	2	2/3	Trent Bridge, Nottingham	Home	25 May 2012	Won

== ODI centuries ==
No.	Score	Against	Pos.	Inn.	S/R	Venue	H/A/N	Date	Result
1	100	West Indies	4	1	86.20	Lord's, London	Home	6 July 2004	Lost
2	152	Bangladesh	2	1	118.75	Trent Bridge, Nottingham	Home	21 June 2005	Won
3	105 ‡	West Indies	1	2	81.39	Providence Stadium, Providence	Away	22 March 2009	Lost
4	154 ‡ ^{M}	Bangladesh	1	1	110.00	Edgbaston, Birmingham	Home	12 July 2010	Won
5	126 ‡ ^{M}	Pakistan	1	2	94.02	Headingley, Leeds	Home	12 September 2010	Won
6	158 ‡ ^{M}	India	1	2	108.96	M. Chinnaswamy Stadium, Bangalore	Away	27 February 2011	Tied
