= List of international cricket centuries by Michael Clarke =

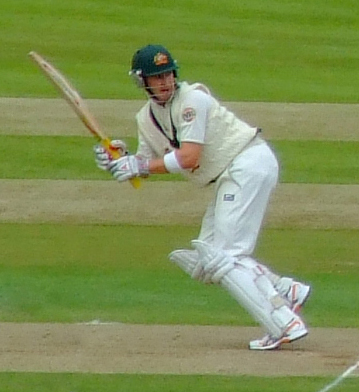
Clarke scored 36 centuries for Australia in international cricket.

Michael Clarke is an Australian former cricketer and captain of the Australia national cricket team. (Note: He retired from T20I in January 2011.) He scored centuries (100 or more runs in a single innings) in Test matches and One Day International (ODI) matches on 28 and 8 occasions respectively during his international career. He played 115 Tests and 238 ODIs for Australia, scoring 8,643 and 7,981 runs, respectively. Journalist Peter English wrote that "Clarke could do anything with the bat, but he has matured into one of the game's most professional, reliable and focussed players". He was named by Wisden as one of their Cricketers of the Year in 2010. Cricket Australia awarded him with the Allan Border Medal in 2005, 2009, 2012 and 2013. (Note: He shared the award with Ponting in 2009.)

Clarke scored a century on his Test debut against India at the M. Chinnaswamy Stadium, Bangalore, in 2004. His highest Test score of 329 not out – the highest individual score in an innings at the Sydney Cricket Ground – came against the same team, during the 2011–12 series. (Note: This was the hundredth Test hosted by the Sydney Cricket Ground, and Clarke became the seventh Test captain to score a triple century (300 or more runs).) As of 2015, Clarke was the only player to have scored four double centuries (200 or more runs) during a calendar year, and the third to achieve two double centuries in a series twice. (Note: The other two players to achieve this feat were Donald Bradman and Wally Hammond.) He has scored Test centuries at sixteen cricket grounds, including eleven at venues outside Australia. He is fifth in the list of Test century-makers for Australia, only bettered by Ricky Ponting, Steve Waugh, Matthew Hayden and Don Bradman.

Having made his ODI debut in 2003 against England at Adelaide Oval, Clarke's first century came against Zimbabwe at the Harare Sports Club in May 2004. His highest ODI score was 130 runs against India at the M. Chinnaswamy Stadium, in 2007. Clarke played 34 Twenty20 International (T20I) matches, with a top score of 67, before retiring in January 2011.

== Key ==
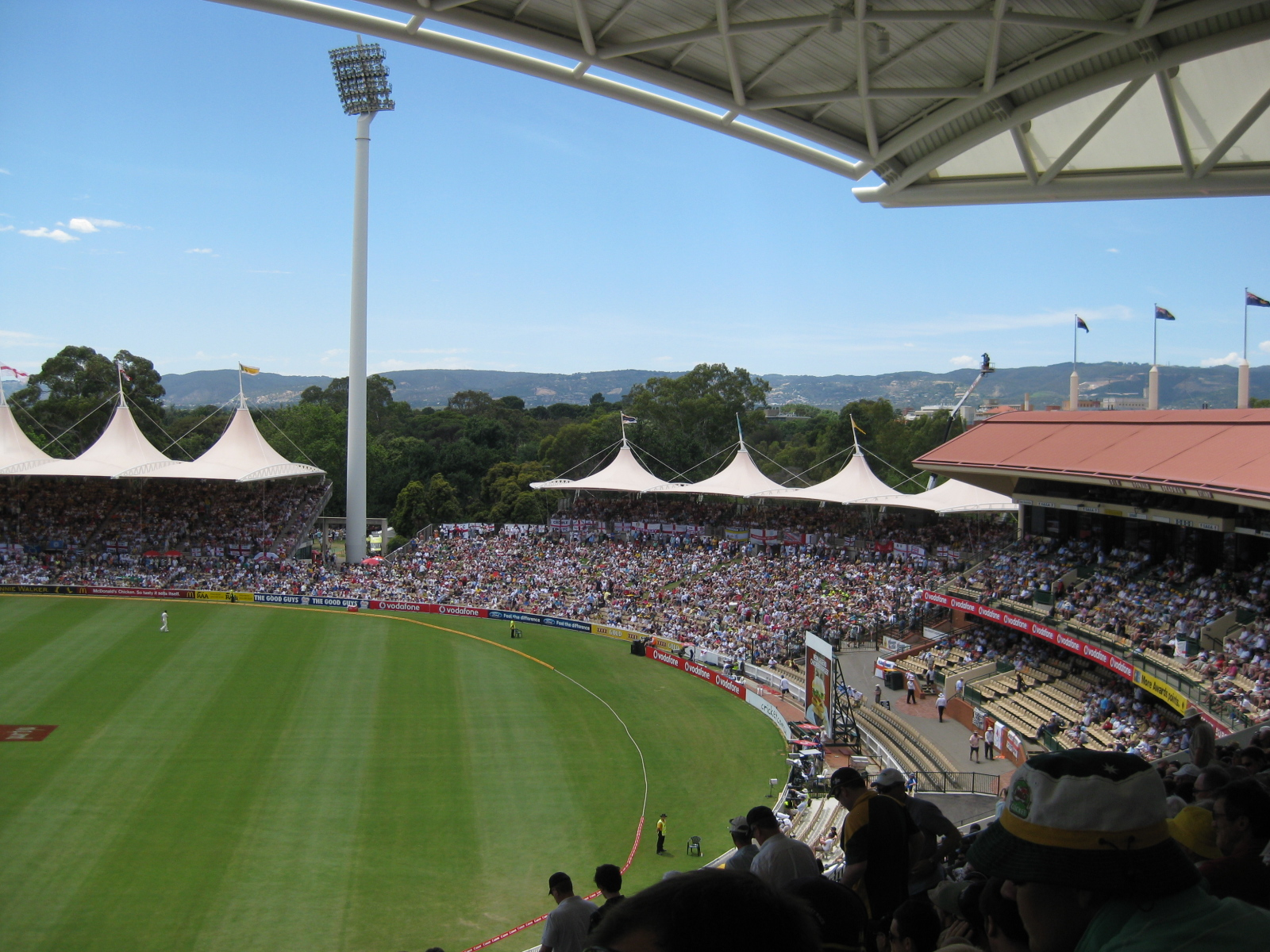
Clarke has scored seven of his Test centuries, including two double centuries, at the Adelaide Oval.

Key
Symbol	Meaning
*	Remained not out.
†	Man of the match
‡	Captained the Australia cricket team
Balls	Balls faced
Pos.	Position in the batting order
Inn.	The innings of the match
Test	The number of the Test match played in that series
SR	Strike rate during the innings
H/A/N	Venue was at home (Australia), away or neutral
Date	Date the match was held, or the starting date of match for Test matches
Lost	The match was lost by Australia.
Won	The match was won by Australia.
Drawn	The match was drawn.
No result	The match was inconclusive.

== Test cricket centuries ==
Test centuries by Michael Clarke
No.	Score	Against	Pos.	Inn.	Test	Venue	H/A/N	Date	Result	Ref
1	151†	India	6	1	1/4	M. Chinnaswamy Stadium, Bangalore	Away	6 October 2004	Won	
2	141†	New Zealand	6	2	1/2	The Gabba, Brisbane	Home	18 November 2004	Won	
3	124	England	6	2	2/5	Adelaide Oval, Adelaide	Home	1 December 2006	Won	
4	135*	England	5	3	3/5	WACA Ground, Perth	Home	14 December 2006	Won	
5	145*	Sri Lanka	5	1	1/2	The Gabba, Brisbane	Home	8 November 2007	Won	
6	118	India	5	2	4/4	Adelaide Oval, Adelaide	Home	24 January 2008	Drawn	
7	110	West Indies	5	1	2/3	Sir Vivian Richards Stadium, North Sound	Away	30 May 2008	Drawn	
8	112	India	5	2	3/4	Feroz Shah Kotla Ground, Delhi	Away	29 October 2008	Drawn	
9	110	New Zealand	5	2	2/2	Adelaide Oval, Adelaide	Home	28 November 2008	Won	
10	138	South Africa	5	1	3/3	Sydney Cricket Ground, Sydney	Home	3 January 2009	Won	
11	136	England	5	4	2/5	Lord's, London	Away	16 July 2009	Lost	
12	103*†	England	5	3	3/5	Edgbaston Cricket Ground, Edgbaston	Away	30 July 2009	Drawn	
13	166	Pakistan	5	1	3/3	Bellerive Oval, Hobart	Home	14 January 2010	Won	
14	168†	New Zealand	5	1	1/2	Basin Reserve, Wellington	Away	19 March 2010	Won	
15	112‡	Sri Lanka	5	3	3/3	Sinhalese Sports Club Ground, Colombo	Away	16 September 2011	Drawn	
16	151‡	South Africa	5	1	1/2	Newlands Cricket Ground, Cape Town	Away	9 November 2011	Lost	
17	139‡	New Zealand	5	2	1/2	The Gabba, Brisbane	Home	1 December 2011	Won	
18	329*†‡	India	5	2	2/4	Sydney Cricket Ground, Sydney	Home	3 January 2012	Won	
19	210‡	India	5	1	4/4	Adelaide Oval, Adelaide	Home	24 January 2012	Won	
20	259*†‡	South Africa	5	2	1/3	The Gabba, Brisbane	Home	9 November 2012	Drawn	
21	230‡	South Africa	5	1	2/3	Adelaide Oval, Adelaide	Home	22 November 2012	Drawn	
22	106‡	Sri Lanka	5	2	2/3	Melbourne Cricket Ground, Melbourne	Home	26 December 2012	Won	
23	130‡	India	5	1	1/4	M. A. Chidambaram Stadium, Chennai	Away	22 February 2013	Lost	
24	187†‡	England	4	1	3/5	Old Trafford, Manchester	Away	1 August 2013	Drawn	
25	113‡	England	4	2	1/5	The Gabba, Brisbane	Home	21 November 2013	Won	
26	148‡	England	4	1	2/5	Adelaide Oval, Adelaide	Home	5 December 2013	Won	
27	161*‡	South Africa	4	1	3/3	Newlands Cricket Ground, Cape Town	Away	1 March 2014	Won	
28	128‡	India	4	1	1/4	Adelaide Oval, Adelaide	Home	9 December 2014	Won	

== One Day International centuries ==
ODI centuries by Michael Clarke
No.	Score	Balls	Against	Pos.	Inn.	SR	Venue	H/A/N	Date	Result	Ref
1	105*	102	Zimbabwe	2	2	102.94	Harare Sports Club, Harare	Home	29 May 2004	Won	
2	103*†	107	Pakistan	1	2	96.26	Sydney Cricket Ground, Sydney	Home	23 January 2005	Won	
3	130	132	India	4	1	98.48	M. Chinnaswamy Stadium, Bangalore	Away	29 September 2007	No result	
4	100*‡	122	Pakistan	4	2	81.96	Sheikh Zayed Stadium, Abu Dhabi	Neutral	1 May 2009	Won	
5	111*‡	139	India	3	1	79.85	ACA-VDCA Stadium, Visakhapatnam	Away	20 October 2010	Lost	
6	101†‡	111	Bangladesh	4	1	90.99	Sher-e-Bangla Cricket Stadium, Dhaka	Away	9 April 2011	Won	
7	117‡	91	Sri Lanka	4	1	128.57	Adelaide Oval, Adelaide	Home	6 March 2012	Lost	
8	105†‡	102	England	4	1	102.94	Old Trafford, Manchester	Away	8 September 2013	Won	
