= List of international cricket centuries by Brian Lara =

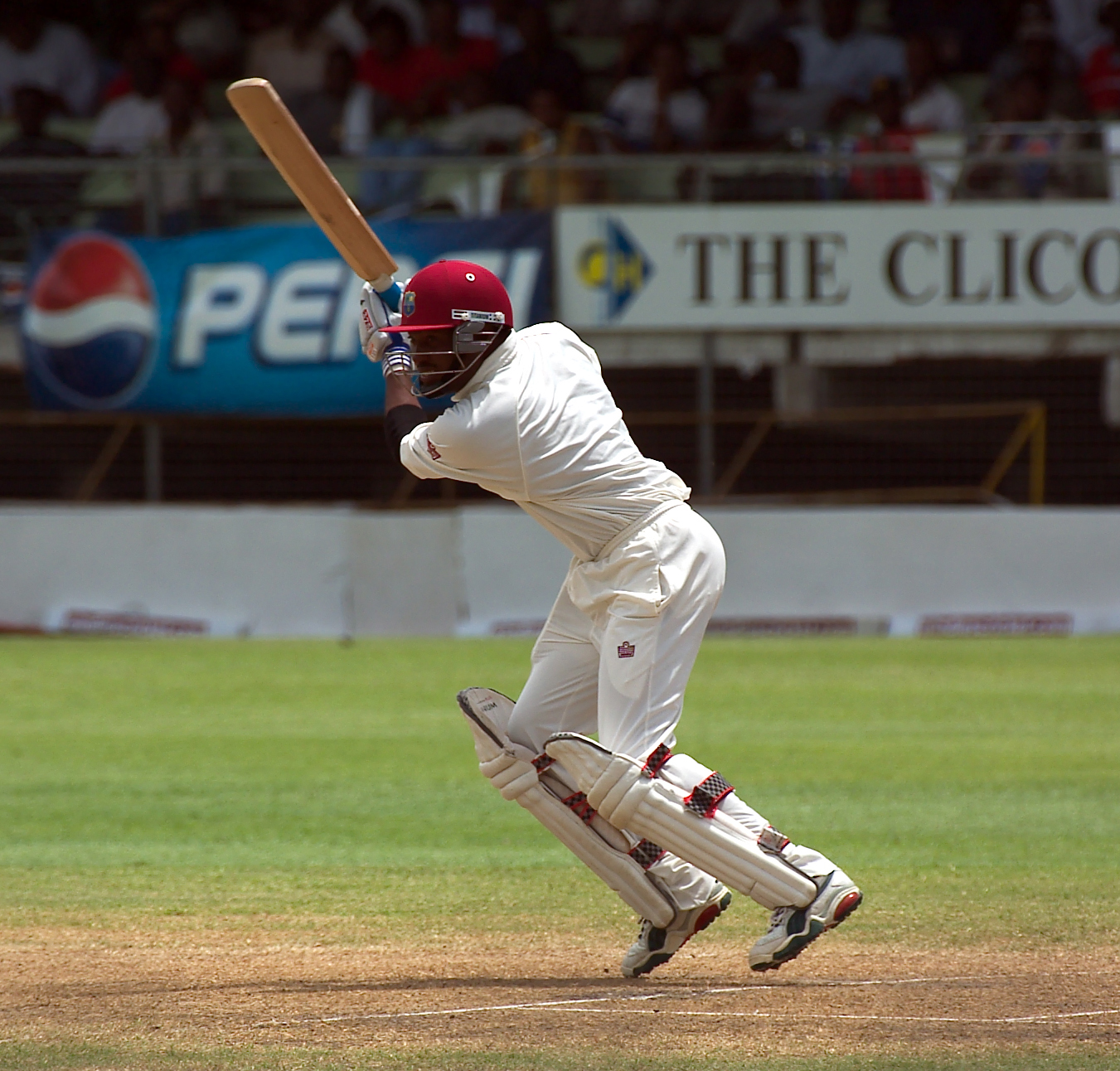
Brian Lara, who made the highest individual score and the only quadruple century in Test cricket

Brian Lara is a former cricketer and captain of the West Indies cricket team. He was a skilled batsman, and was known for his ability to bat for long and high-scoring innings. From his debut in international cricket in 1990 to his retirement in 2007, Lara scored 11,953 runs in Tests and 10,405 in One Day Internationals (ODI), accumulating a total of 53 centuries. His accomplishments with the bat saw him chosen as the BBC Overseas Sports Personality of the Year in 1994, as well as one of the Wisden Cricketers of the Year in 1995.

Lara scored a Test century for the first time in his fifth Test match in 1993 against Australia. His score of 277 in that match is the fourth-highest maiden century in Test history. The 375 he made against England in 1994 was the highest individual Test score for nine years, until Matthew Hayden surpassed it in 2003. Lara regained the world record in 2004 when he made an unbeaten 400, once again against England. It is also the only quadruple century in Test cricket. The unbeaten 153 he scored against Australia in 1999 was rated as the second-best Test innings of all time by the Wisden Cricketers' Almanack in 2001. He has scored more than 200 runs on nine occasions, the highest after Donald Bradman and Kumar Sangakkara Alongside Sir Donald Bradman, Virender Sehwag and Chris Gayle, he is one of four batsmen who have scored triple centuries on two occasions. Lara scored 34 centuries during his Test career, the highest number by a West Indian player. He is ranked sixth for the highest number of centuries in a career along with Mahela Jayawardene, Sunil Gavaskar and Younis Khan, behind Sachin Tendulkar, Jacques Kallis, Ricky Ponting, Kumar Sangakkara and Rahul Dravid.

Lara's first ODI century came more than two years after his debut match, when he scored 128 against Pakistan. His career best is 169 runs made against Sri Lanka in 1995. It is also the third highest individual score by a West Indian batsman. The 117 he made against Bangladesh in 1999 is the fifth fastest century in ODI cricket. It was made in 45 balls at a strike rate of 188.70, reaching the boundary on eighteen occasions and clearing it on four. During his career, he scored more than 150 runs on three occasions. By the time of his retirement, he had scored 19 centuries in ODI matches. This is the second highest number of centuries scored by a single batsman for the West Indies, a record that Chris Gayle surpassed.

== Key ==
- * – Remained not out
- ‡ – Captain in that match
- † – Player of the match
- (D/L) – Result was determined by the Duckworth–Lewis method

== Test cricket centuries ==
No.	Score	Against	Pos.	Inn.	Test	Venue	H/A	Date	Result
1	277†	Australia	4	2	1/5	Sydney Cricket Ground, Sydney	Away	2 January 1993	Drawn
2	167†	England	3	2	2/5	Bourda, Georgetown	Home	17 March 1994	Won
3	375†	England	3	1	5/5	Antigua Recreation Ground, St. John's	Home	16 April 1994	Drawn
4	147	New Zealand	3	1	2/2	Basin Reserve, Wellington	Away	10 February 1995	Won
5	145	England	3	3	4/6	Old Trafford, Manchester	Away	27 July 1995	Lost
6	152	England	3	2	5/6	Trent Bridge, Nottingham	Away	10 August 1995	Drawn
7	179†	England	4	2	6/6	The Oval, London	Away	25 August 1995	Drawn
8	132	Australia	4	2	5/5	WACA Ground, Perth	Away	1 February 1997	Won
9	103†	India	4	1	4/5	Antigua Recreation Ground, St. John's	Home	4 April 1997	Drawn
10	115	Sri Lanka	3	3	2/2	Arnos Vale Stadium, Kingstown	Home	20 June 1997	Drawn
11	213†‡	Australia	4	2	2/4	Sabina Park, Kingston	Home	13 March 1999	Won
12	153*†‡	Australia	5	4	3/4	Kensington Oval, Bridgetown	Home	26 March 1999	Won
13	100‡	Australia	4	2	4/4	Antigua Recreation Ground, St. John's	Home	3 April 1999	Lost
14	112	England	4	3	3/5	Old Trafford, Manchester	Away	3 August 2000	Drawn
15	182	Australia	4	1	3/5	Adelaide Oval, Adelaide	Away	15 December 2000	Lost
16	178	Sri Lanka	4	1	1/3	Galle International Stadium, Galle	Away	13 November 2001	Lost
17	221†	Sri Lanka	4	1	3/3	Sinhalese Sports Club Ground, Colombo	Away	29 November 2001	Lost
18	130†	Sri Lanka	4	3	3/3	Sinhalese Sports Club Ground, Colombo	Away	29 November 2001	Lost
19	110‡	Australia	4	3	1/4	Bourda, Georgetown	Home	10 April 2003	Lost
20	122‡	Australia	4	4	2/4	Queen's Park Oval, Port of Spain	Home	19 April 2003	Lost
21	209†‡	Sri Lanka	4	2	1/2	Beausejour Stadium, Gros Islet	Home	20 June 2003	Drawn
22	191†‡	Zimbabwe	4	1	2/2	Queens Sports Club, Bulawayo	Away	12 November 2003	Won
23	202‡	South Africa	4	2	1/4	Wanderers Stadium, Johannesburg	Away	12 December 2003	Lost
24	115‡	South Africa	4	2	3/4	Newlands Cricket Ground, Cape Town	Away	2 January 2004	Drawn
25	400*†‡	England	3	1	4/4	Antigua Recreation Ground, St. John's	Home	10 April 2004	Drawn
26	120‡	Bangladesh	4	2	2/2	Sabina Park, Kingston	Home	4 June 2004	Won
27	196	South Africa	4	1	2/4	Queen's Park Oval, Port of Spain	Home	8 April 2005	Lost
28	176	South Africa	4	1	3/4	Kensington Oval, Bridgetown	Home	21 April 2005	Lost
29	130	Pakistan	4	1	1/2	Kensington Oval, Bridgetown	Home	26 May 2005	Won
30	153	Pakistan	4	2	2/2	Sabina Park, Kingston	Home	3 June 2005	Lost
31	226†	Australia	4	1	3/3	Adelaide Oval, Adelaide	Away	25 November 2005	Lost
32	120‡	India	3	3	2/4	Beausejour Stadium, Gros Islet	Home	10 June 2006	Drawn
33	122‡	Pakistan	4	3	1/3	Gaddafi Stadium, Lahore	Away	11 November 2006	Lost
34	216‡	Pakistan	3	2	2/3	Multan Cricket Stadium, Multan	Away	19 November 2006	Drawn

== ODI centuries ==
No.	Score	Against	Pos.	Inn.	S.R.	Venue	H/A/N	Date	Result
1	128*	Pakistan	2	1	102.40	Sahara Stadium Kingsmead, Durban	Neutral	19 February 1993	Won
2	111*†	South Africa	2	2	79.28	Springbok Park, Bloemfontein	Away	23 February 1993	Won
3	114†	Pakistan	1	2	98.27	Sabina Park, Kingston	Home	23 March 1993	Won
4	153†	Pakistan	2	2	106.99	Sharjah Cricket Association Stadium, Sharjah	Neutral	5 November 1993	Won
5	139†	Australia	3	1	113.00	Queen's Park Oval, Port of Spain	Home	12 March 1995	Won
6	169†	Sri Lanka	3	1	131.00	Sharjah Cricket Association Stadium, Sharjah	Neutral	16 October 1995	Won
7	111†	South Africa	3	1	118.08	National Stadium, Karachi	Neutral	11 March 1996	Won
8	146*†	New Zealand	3	2	108.95	Queen's Park Oval, Port of Spain	Home	30 March 1996	Won
9	104	New Zealand	3	2	100.97	Arnos Vale Stadium, Kingstown	Home	6 April 1996	Won
10	102	Australia	3	2	89.47	The Gabba, Brisbane	Away	5 January 1997	Won
11	103*†	Pakistan	3	2	88.79	WACA Ground, Perth	Neutral	10 January 1997	Won
12	110‡	England	3	2	103.77	Kensington Oval, Bridgetown	Home	29 March 1998	Lost
13	117†‡	Bangladesh	2	1	188.70	Bangabandhu National Stadium, Dhaka	Away	9 October 1999	Won
14	116*†	Australia	4	2	109.43	Sydney Cricket Ground, Sydney	Away	17 January 2001	Lost (D/L)
15	111†	Kenya	3	1	92.50	Sinhalese Sports Club Ground, Colombo	Neutral	17 September 2002	Won
16	116†	South Africa	3	1	86.56	Newlands Cricket Ground, Cape Town	Away	9 February 2003	Won
17	116‡	Sri Lanka	3	1	109.43	Kensington Oval, Bridgetown	Home	8 June 2003	Lost
18	113‡	Zimbabwe	3	1	137.80	Queens Sports Club, Bulawayo	Away	22 November 2003	Won
19	156†‡	Pakistan	4	1	113.04	Adelaide Oval, Adelaide	Neutral	28 January 2005	Won
