= List of international cricket centuries by Matthew Hayden =

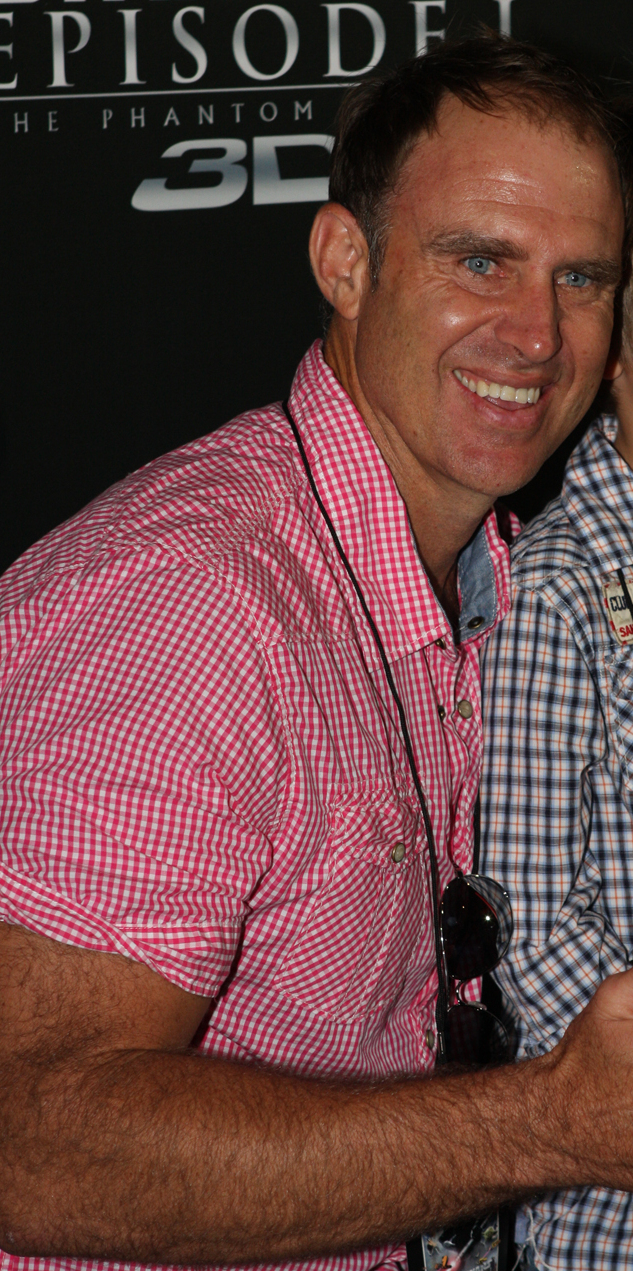
Matthew Hayden has the third-highest number of centuries for an Australian in international cricket.

Matthew Hayden is a former Australian international cricketer. An opening batsman, Hayden scored 8,625 runs in Tests and 6,133 runs in One Day Internationals (ODIs), accruing a total of 40 centuries—30 in Tests and 10 in ODIs. He was described by Yahoo! Cricket as "a strong-built left-hander, an intimidating personality and [possessing] an aggressive attitude", "[with] all the ingredients" needed for success. He was named as one of Indian Cricket's "Cricketers of the Year" in 2001 and as Wisden's Cricketers of the Year in 2003. Hayden was chosen as the "ICC ODI Cricketer of the Year" in 2007.

Hayden made his Test debut against South Africa in March 1994. His first century came three years later at the Adelaide Oval when he scored 125 against the West Indies. It took another four years to score his second international century. He scored centuries against all the Test cricket playing nations, except Bangladesh. His highest score of 380—which was a record score at the time—came against Zimbabwe at the WACA Ground, Perth in October 2003. He broke Brian Lara's nine-year-old record (375 runs); however, Lara reclaimed his record six months later when he scored 400 not out against England. (Note: Hayden's innings remains the highest score by an Australian in a Test match and the second highest for any player as of January 2019.) Hayden scored centuries in each innings of a Test match on two different occasions.

Hayden made his ODI debut in 1993 and scored his first century in 2001 when he made 100 against India at the Indira Priyadarshini Stadium, Visakhapatnam. He made ten centuries against five different opponents and was most successful against New Zealand (four centuries) and India (three centuries). Hayden's highest score of 181 not out was made against New Zealand in 2007; the score was an Australian record at the time. (Note: It was later broken by Shane Watson when he made 185 not out against Bangladesh in April 2011.) His 66-ball century against South Africa during the 2007 World Cup was the fastest by an Australian in ODIs at the time. (Note: As of January 2019, it is the third-fastest by an Australian.) Hayden was the leading run-scorer in the tournament (658 runs) and scored three centuries.

Hayden played nine Twenty20 International (T20I) matches between 2005 and 2007; his highest score in the format is 73 not out. As of January 2019, he ranks fourteenth in the list of century-makers in international cricket.

== Key ==
- * – Remained not out
- † – Man of the match

== Test centuries ==
List of Test centuries scored by Matthew Hayden
No.	Score	Against	Pos.	Inn.	Test	Venue	H/A/N	Date	Result	Ref
1	125	West Indies	2	2	4/5	Adelaide Oval, Adelaide	Home	25 January 1997	Won	
2	119	India	2	2	1/3	Wankhede Stadium, Mumbai	Away	27 February 2001	Won	
3	203 †	India	2	1	3/3	M. A. Chidambaram Stadium, Chennai	Away	18 March 2001	Lost	
4	136	New Zealand	2	1	1/3	Brisbane Cricket Ground, Brisbane	Home	8 November 2001	Drawn	
5	131	South Africa	2	3	1/3	Adelaide Oval, Adelaide	Home	14 December 2001	Won	
6	138 †	South Africa	2	2	2/3	Melbourne Cricket Ground, Melbourne	Home	26 December 2001	Won	
7	105 †	South Africa	2	1	3/3	Sydney Cricket Ground, Sydney	Home	2 January 2002	Won	
8	122	South Africa	2	1	1/3	New Wanderers Stadium, Johannesburg	Away	22 February 2002	Won	
9	119 †	Pakistan	2	2	2/3	Sharjah Cricket Association Stadium, Sharjah	Neutral	11 October 2002	Won	
10	197 †	England	2	1	1/5	Brisbane Cricket Ground, Brisbane	Home	7 November 2002	Won	
11	103 †	England	2	3	1/5	Brisbane Cricket Ground, Brisbane	Home	7 November 2002	Won	
12	102	England	2	1	4/5	Melbourne Cricket Ground, Melbourne	Home	26 December 2002	Won	
13	100*	West Indies	2	3	2/4	Queenspark Oval, Port of Spain	Away	19 April 2003	Won	
14	177	West Indies	2	3	4/4	Antigua Recreation Ground, St. John's	Away	9 May 2003	Lost	
15	380 †	Zimbabwe	2	1	1/2	WACA Ground, Perth	Home	9 October 2003	Won	
16	101*	Zimbabwe	2	4	2/2	Sydney Cricket Ground, Sydney	Home	17 October 2003	Won	
17	136	India	2	2	3/4	Melbourne Cricket Ground, Melbourne	Home	26 December 2003	Won	
18	130 †	Sri Lanka	2	3	1/3	Galle International Stadium, Galle	Away	8 March 2004	Won	
19	117 †	Sri Lanka	2	1	2/2	Bundaberg Rum Stadium, Cairns	Home	9 July 2004	Drawn	
20	132 †	Sri Lanka	2	3	2/2	Bundaberg Rum Stadium, Cairns	Home	9 July 2004	Drawn	
21	138	England	2	2	5/5	Kennington Oval, London	Away	8 September 2005	Drawn	
22	111 †	ICC World XI	2	1	1/1	Sydney Cricket Ground, Sydney	Home	14 October 2005	Won	
23	118	West Indies	2	3	1/3	Brisbane Cricket Ground, Brisbane	Home	3 November 2005	Won	
24	110	West Indies	1	2	2/3	Bellerive Oval, Hobart	Home	17 November 2005	Won	
25	137	South Africa	1	3	2/3	Melbourne Cricket Ground, Melbourne	Home	26 December 2005	Won	
26	102	South Africa	2	3	2/3	Kingsmead Cricket Ground, Durban	Away	24 March 2006	Won	
27	153	England	2	2	4/5	Melbourne Cricket Ground, Melbourne	Home	26 December 2006	Won	
28	124 †	India	2	1	1/4	Melbourne Cricket Ground, Melbourne	Home	26 December 2007	Won	
29	123	India	2	3	2/4	Sydney Cricket Ground, Sydney	Home	2 January 2008	Won	
30	103	India	2	2	4/4	Adelaide Oval, Adelaide	Home	24 January 2008	Drawn	

== One Day International centuries ==
List of ODI centuries scored by Matthew Hayden
No.	Score	Against	Pos.	Inn.	S/R	Venue	H/A/N	Date	Result	Ref
1	111 †	India	2	1	98.23	Indira Priyadarshini Stadium, Visakhapatnam	Away	3 April 2001	Won	
2	146 †	Pakistan	2	1	114.06	Gymkhana Club Ground, Nairobi	Neutral	30 August 2002	Won	
3	109	India	2	2	101.86	Brisbane Cricket Ground, Brisbane	Home	18 January 2004	Lost	
4	126 †	India	2	1	103.27	Sydney Cricket Ground, Sydney	Home	8 February 2004	Won	
5	114 †	New Zealand	2	1	91.93	Jade Stadium, Christchurch	Away	22 February 2005	Won	
6	117	New Zealand	2	1	105.40	WACA Ground, Perth	Home	28 January 2007	Won	
7	181* †	New Zealand	1	1	109.03	Seddon Park, Hamilton	Away	20 February 2007	Lost	
8	101 †	South Africa	2	1	148.52	Warner Park, Basseterre	Neutral	24 March 2007	Won	
9	158 †	West Indies	2	1	110.38	Sir Vivian Richards Stadium, North Sound	Away	27 March 2007	Won	
10	103 †	New Zealand	2	1	103.00	National Cricket Stadium, St. George's	Neutral	20 April 2007	Won	
