= List of international cricket centuries by Desmond Haynes =

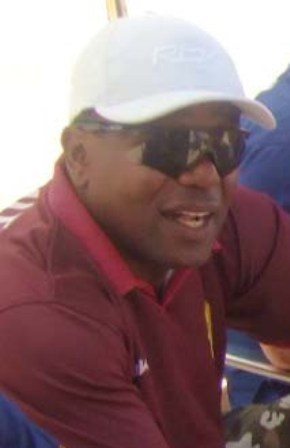
Former West Indies opener, Desmond Haynes

Desmond Haynes is a retired West Indian cricketer and former captain of the West Indies cricket team. He played 116 Test 238 One Day International (ODI) matches, and scored 7,487 and 8,648 runs respectively. He scored centuries (100 or more runs in an innings) in Test matches and One Day International (ODI) matches on 18 and 17 occasions respectively during his international career. He was rated by Trinidad and Tobago Guardian as "one of the greatest of all time", while the BBC described him as "one of the greatest opening partnerships in history with fellow Barbadian Gordon Greenidge." The cricket almanac Wisden noted his "combination of timing and barely evident power", and named him one of their Cricketers of the Year in 1991.

Haynes made his Test debut against Australia at the Queen's Park Oval, Port of Spain, in March 1978. His first Test century came in February 1980 against New Zealand at the Carisbrook, Dunedin, a match the West Indies lost by one wicket. His highest score of 184 runs came the same year against England at the Lord's Cricket Ground, London. Five of his Test centuries came against Australia. Haynes scored Test centuries at twelve cricket grounds, against five different opponents, including eight at venues outside the West Indies. As of October 2023, he is seventh in the list of Test century-makers for the West Indies.

Haynes scored a century on his ODI debut in February 1978 against Australia at the Antigua Recreation Ground, St John's. His score of 148 runs in the match earned him a man of the match award, resulting in the West Indies' win. His highest score in ODIs remained 152 runs, against India at the Bourda, Georgetown in March 1989. Due to his man-of-the-match performance, the West Indies won the match by 101 runs, and the series 5–0. He was most successful against Australia making six ODI centuries against them. Haynes' 17 ODI centuries was previously a record, until Sachin Tendulkar surpassed it in 1998. As of October 2023, Haynes is the third in the list of ODI century-makers for the West Indies.

== Key ==
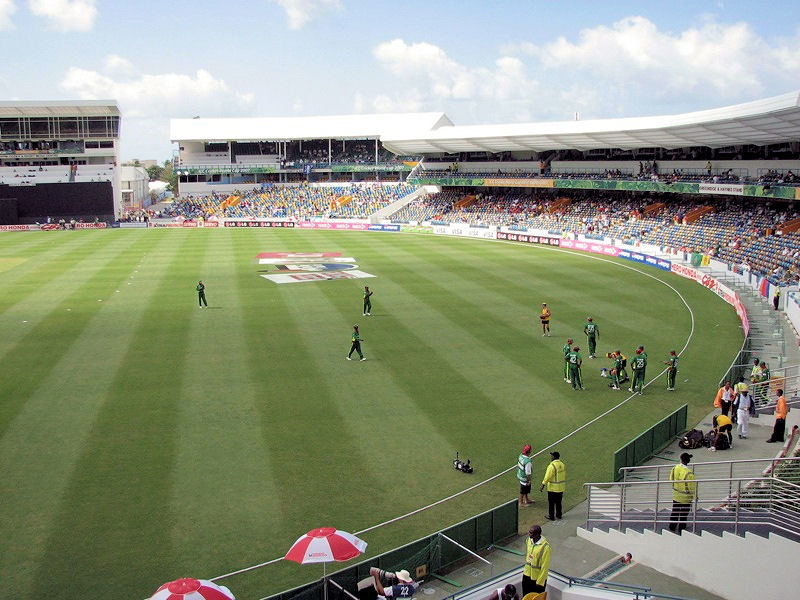
Haynes scored four of his Test centuries at the Kensington Oval, Bridgetown.

Symbol	Meaning
*	Remained not out
†	Man of the match
‡	Captained the West Indies cricket team
Balls	Balls faced
Pos.	Position in the batting order
Inn.	The innings of the match
S/R	Strike rate during the innings
H/A/N	Venue was at home (the West Indies), away or neutral
Date	Match starting day
Lost	The match was lost by the West Indies
Won	The match was won by the West Indies
Drawn	The match was drawn

== Test cricket centuries ==
List of Test centuries by Desmond Haynes
No.	Score	Balls	Against	Pos.	Inn.	S/R	Venue	H/A/N	Date	Result	Ref
1	105	323	New Zealand	2	3	32.50	Carisbrook, Dunedin	Away	8 February 1980	Lost	
2	122	199	New Zealand	2	3	61.30	Lancaster Park, Christchurch	Away	22 February 1980	Won	
3	184	395	England	2	2	46.58	Lord's Cricket Ground, London	Away	19 June 1980	Drawn	
4	136	—	India	2	2	—	Antigua Recreation Ground, St John's	Home	28 April 1983	Won	
5	103*	184	Australia	2	4	55.97	Bourda, Georgetown	Home	2 March 1984	drawn	
6	145	222	Australia	2	2	65.31	Kensington Oval, Bridgetown	Home	30 April 1984	Won	
7	125†	329	England	2	3	37.99	Kennington Oval, London	Away	9 August 1984	Won	
8	131	283	England	2	1	46.88	Antigua Recreation Ground, St John's	Home	11 April 1986	Won	
9	121	269	New Zealand	2	2	56.79	Basin Reserve, Wellington	Away	20 February 1987	Draw	
10	100	194	Australia	2	3	51.54	WACA Ground, Perth	Away	2 December 1988	Won	
11	143	272	Australia	2	3	52.57	Sydney Cricket Ground, Sydney	Away	26 January 1989	Lost	
12	112*	128	India	2	4	87.50	Kensington Oval, Bridgetown	Home	1 April 1989	Won	
13	109	177	England	2	3	61.58	Kensington Oval, Bridgetown	Home	5 April 1990	Won	
14	167 †	317	England	2	2	52.68	Antigua Recreation Ground, St John's	Home	12 April 1990	Won	
15	117‡	248	Pakistan	2	1	48.54	National Stadium, Karachi	Away	15 November 1990	Lost	
16	111	223	Australia	2	2	49.77	Bourda, Georgetown	Home	23 March 1991	Won	
17	143*†	288	Pakistan	1	3	49.65	Queen's Park Oval, Port of Spain	Home	16 April 1993	Won	
18	125 †	206	Pakistan	1	1	60.67	Kensington Oval, Bridgetown	Home	23 April 1993	Won	

== ODI centuries ==
List of ODI centuries by Desmond Haynes
No.	Score	Balls	Against	Pos.	Inn.	S/R	Venue	H/A/N	Date	Result	Ref
1	148 †	136	Australia	2	1	108.82	Antigua Recreation Ground, St John's	Home	22 February 1978	Won	
2	108* †	130	Australia	1	1	83.07	Sydney Cricket Ground, Sydney	Away	17 January 1984	Won	
3	133* †	147	Australia	2	2	90.47	Albion Sports Complex, Albion	Home	29 February 1984	Won	
4	102* †	142	Australia	2	2	71.83	Mindoo Philip Park, Castries	Home	19 April 1984	Won	
5	104* †	102	Australia	2	2	101.96	Sabina Park, Kingston	Home	26 April 1984	Won	
6	123* †	130	Australia	2	2	94.61	Melbourne Cricket Ground, Melbourne	Home	6 January 1985	Won	
7	145* †	157	New Zealand	1	1	92.35	Albion Sports Complex, Albion	Home	14 April 1985	Won	
8	116 †	138	New Zealand	1	1	84.05	Kensington Oval, Bridgetown	Home	23 April 1985	Won	
9	105	124	Sri Lanka	1	1	84.67	National Stadium, Karachi	Neutral	13 October 1987	Won	
10	142* †	132	Pakistan	1	1	107.57	Queen's Park Oval, Port of Spain	Home	18 March 1988	Won	
11	111 †	107	Pakistan	2	1	103.73	Adelaide Oval, Adelaide	Neutral	10 December 1988	Won	
12	101 †	112	Pakistan	1	1	90.17	Bellerive Oval, Hobart	Neutral	17 December 1988	Won	
13	117* †	132	India	2	1	88.63	Kensington Oval, Bridgetown	Home	7 March 1989	Won	
14	152* †	125	India	2	1	120.63	Bourda, Georgetown	Home	19 March 1989	Won	
15	138* †	164	England	1	1	84.14	Captain Roop Singh Stadium, Gwalior	Neutral	27 October 1989	Won	
16	107*	137	Pakistan	1	1	78.10	Eden Gardens, Calcutta (Note: Calcutta was renamed as Kolkata in 2001.)	Neutral	1 November 1989	Lost	
17	115 †	112	England	2	2	102.67	Queen's Park Oval, Port of Spain	Home	5 March 1994	Won	
