= List of international cricket centuries by Sunil Gavaskar =

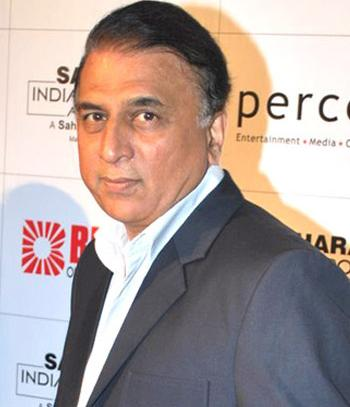
Gavaskar has scored the third-highest number of centuries in Tests for India.

Sunil Gavaskar is a former international cricketer who represented and captained the Indian cricket team. In a career spanning over 16 years he made 35 centuries (100 or more runs) at the international level. Described as one of the greatest opening batsmen in cricket history, Gavaskar played 125 Test matches and scored 10,122 runs. He was the first batsman to score 10,000 Test runs and held the record for most runs until Allan Border surpassed it. Gavaskar's record of 34 Test centuries stood for almost two decades before Tendulkar surpassed it in December 2005. He was named the Indian Cricket Cricketer of the Year in 1971 and as one of the Wisden Cricketers of the Year in 1980. In February 2012, the International Cricket Council (ICC) inducted him into the ICC Cricket Hall of Fame. As of 2012, he is the third-highest run scorer for India in Test cricket, after Sachin Tendulkar and Rahul Dravid.

Making his Test debut against the West Indies in March 1971, Gavaskar scored his first century in the third Test of the same series. In the final Test at Port of Spain he scored centuries in both innings of the match with scores of 124 and 220, becoming the second Indian player to perform the feat. He became the first player to score two centuries in a Test match for the third time, when he made 107 and 182 not out in a match against the West Indies in December 1978. Gavaskar's highest Test score of 236 not out came against the West Indies at Chennai in 1983, (Note: Madras was renamed as Chennai in 1996.) an Indian record at that time. He has scored 150 or more runs in a Test match innings on twelve occasions. Gavaskar was most successful against the West Indies and Australia scoring 13 and 8 centuries respectively.

Gavaskar made his One Day International (ODI) debut against England at Headingley in 1974. Unlike his Test career, his ODI career was less illustrious scoring 3,092 runs at an average of 35.13. Gavaskar's solitary century in ODIs came in the penultimate innings of his career—against New Zealand—during the 1987 Cricket World Cup where he scored 103 runs in 88 balls; the performance ensured India's victory, which earned him a man of the match award.

== Key ==
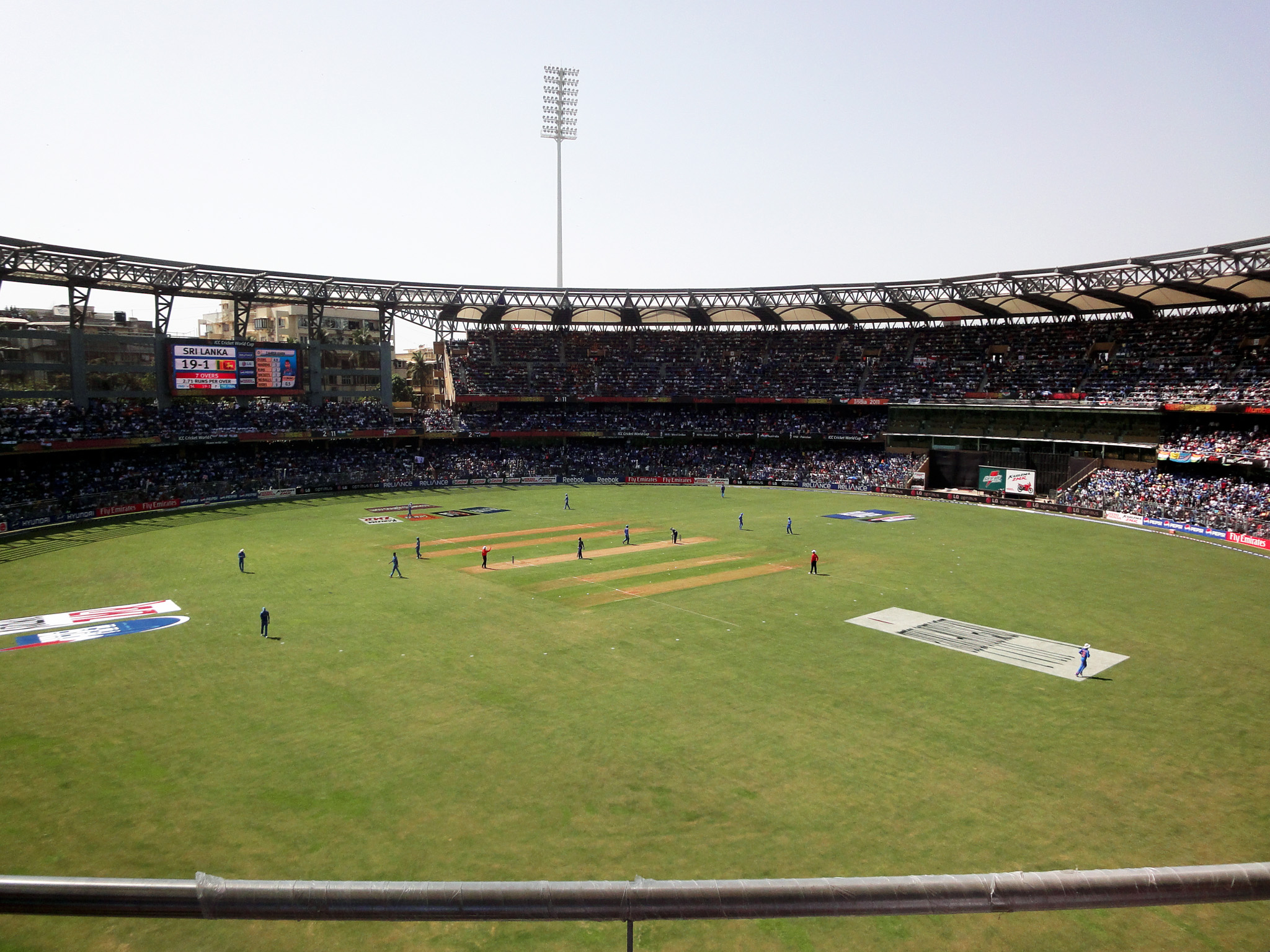
Gavaskar scored five of his Test centuries at the Wankhede Stadium, Mumbai.

Key
Symbol	Meaning
*	Remained not out.
‡	Gavaskar was named "Man of the match".
†	Captained the Indian cricket team.
Pos.	Position in the batting order
Inn.	The innings of the match.
Test	The number of the Test match played in that series.
S/R.	Strike rate during the innings
H/A/N	Venue was at home (India), away or neutral.
Date	Date the match was held, or the starting date of match for Test matches.
Lost	The match was lost by India.
Won	The match was won by India.
Drawn	The match was drawn.

== Test cricket centuries ==
List of Test centuries scored by Sunil Gavaskar
No.	Score	Against	Pos.	Inn.	Test	Venue	H/A/N	Date	Result
1	116	West Indies	2	2	3/5	Bourda, Georgetown	Away	19 March 1971	Draw
2	117*	West Indies	2	4	4/5	Kensington Oval, Bridgetown	Away	1 April 1971	Draw
3	124 (Note: Gavaskar made centuries in both innings of the match.)	West Indies	2	1	5/5	Queen's Park Oval, Port of Spain	Away	13 April 1971	Draw
4	220 (Note: Gavaskar's second century in the match.)	West Indies	2	3	5/5	Queen's Park Oval, Port of Spain	Away	13 April 1971	Draw
5	101	England	1	2	1/3	Old Trafford, Manchester	Away	6 June 1974	Lost
6	116 †	New Zealand	1	2	1/3	Eden Park, Auckland	Away	24 January 1976	Won
7	156	West Indies	1	2	2/4	Queen's Park Oval, Port of Spain	Away	24 March 1976	Draw
8	102	West Indies	1	4	3/4	Queen's Park Oval, Port of Spain	Away	7 April 1976	Won
9	119	New Zealand	1	1	1/3	Wankhede Stadium, Bombay (Note: Bombay was renamed as Mumbai in 1995.)	Home	10 November 1976	Won
10	108	England	1	1	5/5	Wankhede Stadium, Bombay	Home	11 February 1977	Draw
11	113	Australia	1	4	1/5	Brisbane Cricket Ground, Brisbane	Away	2 December 1977	Lost
12	127	Australia	1	3	2/5	Western Australia Cricket Association Ground, Perth	Away	16 December 1977	Lost
13	118	Australia	1	3	3/5	Melbourne Cricket Ground, Melbourne	Away	30 December 1977	Won
14	111	Pakistan	1	1	3/3	National Stadium, Karachi	Away	14 November 1978	Lost
15	137	Pakistan	1	3	3/3	National Stadium, Karachi	Away	14 November 1978	Lost
16	205 †	West Indies	1	1	1/6	Wankhede Stadium, Bombay	Home	1 December 1978	Draw
17	107 †	West Indies	1	1	3/6	Eden Gardens, Calcutta (Note: Calcutta was renamed as Kolkata in 2001.)	Home	29 December 1978	Draw
18	182* †	West Indies	1	3	3/6	Eden Gardens, Calcutta	Home	29 December 1978	Draw
19	120 †	West Indies	1	1	5/6	Feroz Shah Kotla Ground, Delhi	Home	24 January 1979	Draw
20	221 ‡	England	1	4	4/4	Kennington Oval, London	Away	30 August 1979	Draw
21	115 †	Australia	1	1	4/6	Feroz Shah Kotla Ground, Delhi	Home	13 October 1979	Draw
22	123 †	Australia	1	1	6/6	Wankhede Stadium, Bombay	Home	3 November 1979	Won
23	166 †	Pakistan	1	2	5/6	M. A. Chidambaram Stadium, Madras	Home	15 January 1980	Won
24	172 † ‡	England	1	2	2/6	Karnataka State Cricket Association Stadium, Bangalore	Home	9 December 1981	Draw
25	155 †	Sri Lanka	1	2	1/1	M. A. Chidambaram Stadium, Madras	Home	17 September 1982	Draw
26	127* †	Pakistan	1	3	3/6	Iqbal Stadium, Faisalabad	Away	3 January 1983	Lost
27	147*	West Indies	1	2	3/5	Bourda, Georgetown	Away	31 March 1983	Draw
28	103*	Pakistan	1	3	1/3	Karnataka State Cricket Association Stadium, Bangalore	Home	14 September 1983	Draw
29	121	West Indies	1	1	2/6	Feroz Shah Kotla Ground, Delhi	Home	29 October 1983	Draw
30	236* ‡	West Indies	4	2	6/6	M. A. Chidambaram Stadium, Madras	Home	28 December 1983	Draw
31	166*	Australia	1	2	1/3	Adelaide Oval, Adelaide	Away	15 December 1985	Draw
32	172	Australia	1	1	3/3	Sydney Cricket Ground, Sydney	Away	2 January 1986	Draw
33	103	Australia	1	2	3/3	Wankhede Stadium, Bombay	Home	15 October 1986	Draw
34	176 ‡	Sri Lanka	1	2	1/3	Green Park Stadium, Kanpur	Home	17 December 1986	Draw

== ODI centuries ==
List of ODI centuries scored by Sunil Gavaskar
No.	Score	Against	Pos.	Inn.	S/R	Venue	H/A/N	Date	Result
1	103 ‡ (Note: The man of the match award was shared between Gavaskar and Chetan Sharma.)	New Zealand	2	2	117.04	Vidarbha Cricket Association Ground, Nagpur	Home	31 October 1987	Won
