= English cricket team in Australia in 1990–91 =

International cricket tour

England in Australia in 1990/91
	Australia	England
- Dates: 25 October 1990 – 5 February 1991
Captains	Allan Border	Graham Gooch

Test series
- Result: Australia won the 5-match series 3–0
Most runs	David Boon (530)	Graham Gooch (426)
Most wickets	Bruce Reid (27)	Devon Malcolm (16)

The England cricket team toured Australia during the 1990–91 cricket season to compete in a five-match Test series against Australia for the Ashes. While in Australia, England also played a number of tour matches against state and representative teams, and competed in the one-day international (ODI) World Series Cup against Australia and New Zealand. At the conclusion of the tour, England flew to New Zealand to participate in a three-game ODI series.

Under the captaincy of Graham Gooch, England were unable to regain the Ashes, losing the series 3–0.

== Touring squad ==
The England squad flew out to Australia on 18 October 1990. The personnel was vastly different due to the turbulent years that had followed the previous tour to Australia, which had been won 2–1 under Mike Gatting, who had chosen to captain an England XI on a rebel tour of South Africa and subsequently had been banned from Test cricket for three years. Following the humiliation of the 1989 Ashes series defeat, Graham Gooch replaced David Gower as captain and although England continued their streak of series defeats against West Indies (going down 2–1 after winning the First Test), they won back much respect, and then followed up with series wins against India and New Zealand during the home summer.

As a result, although the initial squad contained a number of inexperienced Test players (only five squad members – Gooch, Gower, Allan Lamb, Gladstone Small and Eddie Hemmings – had been on earlier tours of Australia), journalists such as former Test cricketer Mike Selvey (writing for The Guardian at the time) felt somewhat confident that England could match it with the Australians.

- Graham Gooch (c) (Essex)
- Allan Lamb (vc) (Northamptonshire)
- Michael Atherton (Lancashire)
- Wayne Larkins (Northamptonshire)
- David Gower (Hampshire)
- Robin Smith (Hampshire)
- John Morris (Derbyshire)
- Alec Stewart (wk) (Surrey)
- Jack Russell (wk) (Gloucestershire)
- Chris Lewis (Leicestershire)
- Eddie Hemmings (Nottinghamshire)
- Phil Tufnell (Middlesex)
- Angus Fraser (Middlesex)
- Devon Malcolm (Derbyshire)
- Gladstone Small (Warwickshire)
- Martin Bicknell (Surrey)

Phillip DeFreitas (Lancashire) Hugh Morris (Glamorgan) and Phil Newport (Worcestershire) received subsequent call-ups to cover or replace injured players.

As on the previous Australian series, the tour was managed by Peter Lush, while Micky Stewart was team manager.

== Test series summary ==
=== 1st Test ===
23–25 November 1990
Scorecard

England; 194 (78 overs) & 114 (53.1 overs)	v	Australia; 152 (63 overs) & 0/157 (46 overs)

Australia won by 10 wickets
The Gabba, Brisbane

=== 2nd Test ===
26–30 December 1990
Scorecard

England; 352 (131.4 overs) & 150 (73 overs)	v	Australia; 306 (112.5 overs) & 2/197 (86 overs)

Australia won by 8 wickets
Melbourne Cricket Ground, Melbourne

=== 3rd Test ===
4–8 January 1991
Scorecard

Australia; 518 (157 overs) & 205 (89 overs)	v	England; 8/469d (172.1 overs) & 4/113 (25 overs)

Match drawn
Sydney Cricket Ground, Sydney

=== 4th Test ===
25–29 January 1991
Scorecard

Australia; 386 (135.2 overs) & 6/314d (104 overs)	v	England; 229 (81.3 overs) & 5/335 (96 overs)

Match drawn
Adelaide Oval, Adelaide

=== 5th Test ===
1–5 February 1991
Scorecard

England; 244 (66.4 overs) & 182 (61.3 overs)	v	Australia; 307 (90.5 overs) & 1/120 (31.2 overs)

Australia won by 9 wickets
WACA Ground, Perth

== Tour matches ==
2–5 November 1990
Scorecard

Western Australia	v	England XI
289 (85.1 overs); Graeme Wood 108 (218); Michael Atherton 3/27 (4.1 overs)		246 (78.4 overs); Allan Lamb 84 (111); Chris Matthews 5/66 (16 overs)
4/329d (104 overs); Geoff Marsh 151 (250); Devon Malcolm 1/54 (22 overs)		9/222 (83 overs); Robin Smith 98* (231); Terry Alderman 3/49 (17 overs)

Match drawn
WACA Ground, Perth
Umpires: Peter McConnell and Ric Evans

- England XI won the toss and elected to field.

October

- 25 - WACA President's XI - Lilac Hill, Perth, Western Australia - England won by 6 wickets
- 30 - Western Australia Combined XI - Perth, Australia - WAC XI won by 3 wickets

November

- 2-5 - Western Australia - Perth, Western Australia - match drawn
- 9-12 - South Australia - Adelaide, South Australia - South Australia won by 6 wickets
- 14 - Tasmania - Hobart, Tasmania - England won by 8 wickets
- 16-19 - An Australian XI - Hobart, Australia - match drawn

December

- 4 - Prime Minister's XI - Canberra, Australian Capital Territory - PM's XI won by 31 runs
- 20-23 - Victoria - Ballarat, Victoria - match drawn

January

- 13-16 - New South Wales - Albury, New South Wales - NSW won by 6 wickets
- 19-22 - Queensland - Carrarra, Queensland - England won by 10 wickets

== World Series Cup ==
England also played in the World Series Cup triangular tournament with Australia and New Zealand. England finished third in the table not qualifying for the finals.

December

- 1 v New Zealand, Adelaide Oval - New Zealand by 7 runs
- 7 v New Zealand, WACA, Perth - England by 4 wickets
- 9 v Australia, WACA, Perth - Australia by 6 wickets
- 13 v New Zealand, Sydney Cricket Ground - England by 33 runs
- 15 v New Zealand, Gabba, Brisbane - New Zealand by 8 wickets
- 16 v Australia, Gabba, Brisbane - Australia by 37 runs

January

- 1 v Australia, Sydney Cricket Ground - Australia by 68 runs
- 10 v Australia, Melbourne Cricket Ground - Australia by 3 runs
- England failed to qualify for the finals.

== External sources ==
- CricketArchive – tour itinerary

== Annual reviews ==
- Playfair Cricket Annual 1991
- Wisden Cricketers' Almanack 1991
