= 1990–91 Ashes series =

International cricket tour

1990-91 Ashes Series
- Part of the English cricket team in Australia in 1990-91
- Date: 23 November 1990 - 5 February 1991
- Location: Australia
- Result: Australia won the 5-Test series 3-0
- Player of the series: Bruce Reid
Teams
- Australia: England
Captains
- Allan Border: Allan Lamb (stand-in); Graham Gooch
Most runs
- David Boon (530) Greg Matthews (353) Geoff Marsh (314): Graham Gooch (426); David Gower (407); Mike Atherton (279)
Most wickets
- Bruce Reid (27) Craig McDermott (18) Terry Alderman (16): Devon Malcolm (16); Angus Fraser (11); Phil DeFreitas (10)

The England cricket team toured Australia in the 1990–91 season to play a five-match Test series against Australia for The Ashes. The Australians were the holders, having reclaimed the Ashes in England during the 1989 Ashes series. However, the 1986-87 Ashes series, which was the previous series in Australia, had been won by England. The English tourists were confident their home series loss in 1989 had been a blip and that they were more than capable of reclaiming the Ashes. The tourists were seemingly well-prepared; during their home summer they had 1-0 victories in 3-test series against both India and New Zealand, and had played well in their warm-up matches.

The Australians, though, led by the authoritative Allan Border, were in a ruthless mood. They had home series victories against Sri Lanka and Pakistan, but had lost a one-off test to New Zealand since the 1989 Ashes series victory, and Border and his men were determined to defend the trophy.

The Australians came out aggressively from the start, and, combined with moments of bad-luck for the tourists, proved too much pressure for the England team to handle. The five-test series was won 3-0 by Australia.

Unlike the 1989 series, however, only the final test was an outright walkover: England showed considerably more fight than they had two years previously. They narrowly had the better of the first innings in the first two Tests, before in each case suffering a second-innings batting collapse leaving Australia a comparatively small target to chase.

The third Test was almost a reverse of the first two, with Australia taking a narrow first innings lead after England declared while still short of the Australian total, before collapsing in the second innings. Only stalwart defence by the last two Australian wickets denied England, holding them up for a couple of hours on the last day, and leaving them with insufficient time to chase the runs.

In the fourth Test, Australia took a large first-innings lead, and declared in their second innings to set England an improbably high target in the final innings. Yet the tourists made such a good fist of the chase that the match could have swung either way if an extra day had been available.

Australia finished the series in style with a one-sided victory in the fifth Test. They took a 63-run first innings lead and bowled England out for 182, before easing to their target of 120 with nine wickets to spare.

== Test series ==
=== 1st Test ===
23–25 November 1990
Scorecard

England	v	Australia
194 (78 overs); David Gower 61 (121); Bruce Reid 4/53 (18 overs)		152 (63 overs); Greg Matthews 35 (93); Chris Lewis 3/29 (9 overs)
114 (53.1 overs); David Gower 27 (44); Terry Alderman 6/47 (22 overs)		0/157 (46 overs); Geoff Marsh 72* (154)

Australia won by 10 wickets
The Gabba, Brisbane
Umpires: Tony Crafter and Peter McConnell
Player of the match: Terry Alderman (Aus)

- Australia won the toss and fielded
- Carl Rackemann (AUS) and Martin Bicknell (ENG) were named 12th men for their respective teams
- Australia lead the five test series 1–0.

=== 2nd Test ===
26–30 December 1990
Scorecard

England	v	Australia
352 (131.4 overs); DI Gower 100 (170); BA Reid 6/97 [39]		306 (112.5 overs); AR Border 62 (164); ARC Fraser 6/82 [39]
150 (73 overs); GA Gooch 58 (116); BA Reid 7/51 [22]		197/2 (86 overs); DC Boon 94* (234); ARC Fraser 1/33 [20]

Australia won by 8 wickets
Melbourne Cricket Ground, Melbourne
Umpires: AR Crafter (Aus) and PJ McConnell (Aus)
Player of the match: BA Reid (Aus)

- Australia lead the five test series 2–0.

=== 3rd Test ===
4–8 January 1991
Scorecard

Australia	v	England
518 (157 overs); GRJ Matthews 128 (175); DE Malcolm 4/128 [45]		469/8d (172.1 overs); DI Gower 123 (236); TM Alderman 3/62 [20.1]
205 (89 overs); IA Healy 69 (160); PCR Tufnell 5/61 [37]		113/4 (25 overs); GA Gooch 54 (42); GRJ Matthews 2/26 [9]

Match drawn
Sydney Cricket Ground, Sydney
Umpires: AR Crafter (Aus) and PJ McConnell (Aus)
Player of the match: MA Atherton (Eng)

Australia lead the five test series 2–0.

=== 4th Test ===
25–29 January 1991
Scorecard

Australia	v	England
386 (135.2 overs); ME Waugh 138 (188); PAJ DeFreitas 4/56 [26.2]		229 (81.3 overs); GA Gooch 87 (197); CJ McDermott 5/97 [26.3]
314/6d (104 overs); DC Boon 121 (277); PCR Tufnell 1/28 [16]		335/5 (96 overs); GA Gooch 117 (188); BA Reid 2/59 [23]

Match drawn
Adelaide Oval, Adelaide
Umpires: LJ King (Aus) and TA Prue (Aus)
Player of the match: GA Gooch (Eng)

- Australia lead the five test series 2–0.

=== 5th Test ===
1–5 February 1991
Scorecard

England	v	Australia
244 (66.4 overs); AJ Lamb 91 (122); CJ McDermott 8/97 [24.4]		307 (90.5 overs); DC Boon 64 (124); DE Malcolm 3/94 [30]
182 (61.3 overs); RA Smith 43 (70); MG Hughes 4/37 [20]		120/1 (31.2 overs); GR Marsh 63* (110); PAJ DeFreitas 1/29 [6.2]

Australia won by 9 wickets
WACA Ground, Perth
Umpires: SG Randell (Aus) and CD Timmins (Aus)
Player of the match: CJ McDermott (Aus)

- Australia won the five test series 3–0.

== External sources ==
- CricketArchive – tour itinerary

== Annual reviews ==
- Playfair Cricket Annual 1991
- Wisden Cricketers' Almanack 1991
