= International cricket in 1989 =

International cricket season

The 1989 International cricket season was from May 1989 to September 1989. The only international series iduring this season was Australia tour of England for The Ashes Test series and 3-ODI Texaco Trophy.

== Season overview ==
International tours
| Start date | Home team | Away team | Results [Matches] | | | |
| Start date | Home team | Away team | Test | ODI | FC | LA |
|---|---|---|---|---|---|---|
| 25 May 1989 | England | Australia | 0–4 [6] | 1–1 [3] | — | — |

== May ==
=== Australia in England ===
Texaco Trophy - ODI series
| No. | Date | Home captain | Away captain | Venue | Result |
|---|---|---|---|---|---|
| ODI 566 | 25 May | David Gower | Allan Border | Old Trafford Cricket Ground, Manchester | England by 95 runs |
| ODI 567 | 27 May | David Gower | Allan Border | Trent Bridge, Nottingham | Match tied |
| ODI 568 | 29 May | David Gower | Allan Border | Lord's, London | Australia by 6 wickets |
The Ashes - Test series
| No. | Date | Home captain | Away captain | Venue | Result |
| Test 1121 | 8–13 June | David Gower | Allan Border | Headingley Cricket Ground, Leeds | Australia by 210 runs |
| Test 1122 | 22–27 June | David Gower | Allan Border | Lord's, London | Australia by 6 wickets |
| Test 1123 | 6–11 July | David Gower | Allan Border | Edgbaston Cricket Ground, Birmingham | Match drawn |
| Test 1124 | 27 July-1 August | David Gower | Allan Border | Old Trafford Cricket Ground, Manchester | Australia by 9 wickets |
| Test 1125 | 10–14 August | David Gower | Allan Border | Trent Bridge, Nottingham | Australia by an innings and 180 runs |
| Test 1126 | 24–29 August | David Gower | Allan Border | Kennington Oval, London | Match drawn |
