= International cricket in 1984 =

International cricket season

The 1984 International cricket season was from May 1984 to September 1984.

== Season overview ==
International tours
Start date	Home team	Away team	Results [Matches]			
Start date	Home team	Away team	Test	ODI	FC	LA
30 May 1984	England	West Indies	0–5 [5]	1–2 [3]	—	—
23 August 1984	England	Sri Lanka	0–0 [1]	—	—	—

== May ==
=== West Indies in England ===
ODI series
No.	Date	Home captain	Away captain	Venue	Result
ODI 264	31 May	David Gower	Clive Lloyd	Trent Bridge, Nottingham	West Indies by 104 runs
ODI 265	2 June	David Gower	Clive Lloyd	Old Trafford, Manchester	England by 3 wickets
ODI 266	4 June	David Gower	Clive Lloyd	Lord's, London	West Indies by 8 wickets
Test series
No.	Date	Home captain	Away captain	Venue	Result
Test 989	14–18 June	David Gower	Clive Lloyd	Edgbaston, Birmingham	West Indies by an innings and 180 runs
Test 990	28 June–3 July	David Gower	Clive Lloyd	Lord's, London	West Indies by 9 wickets
Test 991	12–16 July	David Gower	Clive Lloyd	Headingley, Leeds	West Indies by 8 wickets
Test 992	26–31 July	David Gower	Clive Lloyd	Old Trafford, Manchester	West Indies by an innings and 64 runs
Test 993	9–14 August	David Gower	Clive Lloyd	The Oval, London	West Indies by 172 runs

== August ==
=== Sri Lanka in England ===
One-off Test
No.	Date	Home captain	Away captain	Venue	Result
Test 994	23–28 August	David Gower	Duleep Mendis	Lord's, London	Match drawn
