= List of international cricket centuries by Allan Border =

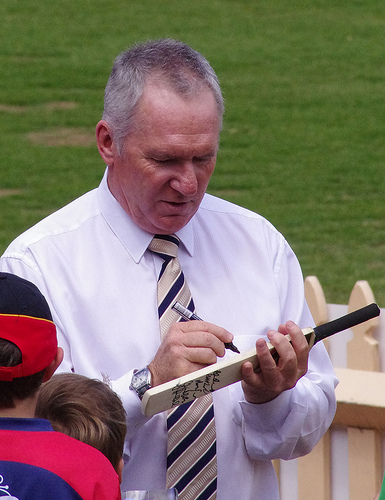
Allan Border has the sixth-highest number of Test centuries for Australia.

Allan Border is a former international cricketer and captain of the Australia cricket team. A left-handed middle order batsman, he scored centuries in Test and One Day International (ODI) matches organised by the International Cricket Council (ICC). Border scored 11,174 runs in 156 Tests and captained Australia in 93 of them. He holds the record for consecutive appearances (153 matches) as a player in Tests. Border was named by Wisden as one of its five Cricketers of the Year in 1982. He was the second Australian player after Sir Donald Bradman to receive the Order of Australia (AM) for his contribution to cricket, and was one of 55 initial inductees of the ICC Cricket Hall of Fame.

Border made his Test debut against England in December 1978 at the Melbourne Cricket Ground. His first century came three months later against Pakistan at the same venue. Border's 27 Test hundreds were scored at 14 different grounds; 14 hundreds were made at venues outside Australia. In Tests, he was most successful against England accumulating eight centuries. Border's highest score of 205 – one of his two double centuries – came against New Zealand at the Adelaide Oval in 1987. As of 2012, he is thirteenth overall in the list of most hundreds in Test cricket.

In ODI cricket, Border scored his first century against India in 1980, when he made 105 not out. The performance ensured Australia's victory and he was named "Man of the match". Border went on to score two more centuries until the end of his career – the first of them came against Sri Lanka (118) and the last one against West Indies (127), which was also his highest score in the format – he remained not out on both occasions.

== Key ==
Key
Symbol	Meaning
*	Remained not out.
‡	Border was named "Man of the match".
†	Captained the Australian cricket team.
Pos.	Position in the batting order.
Inn.	The innings of the match.
Test	The number of the Test match played in that series.
SR	Strike rate during the innings
H/A/N	Venue was at home (Australia), away or neutral.
Date	Date the match was held, or the starting date of match for Test matches.
Lost	The match was lost by Australia.
Won	The match was won by Australia.
Drawn	The match was drawn.

== Test cricket centuries ==
List of Test centuries scored by Allan Border
No.	Score	Against	Pos.	Inn.	Test	Venue	H/A/N	Date	Result	Ref
1	105	Pakistan	3	4	1/2	Melbourne Cricket Ground, Melbourne	Home	10 March 1979	Lost	
2	162	India	3	1	1/6	M. A. Chidambaram Stadium, Chennai	Away	11 September 1979	Drawn	
3	115	England	3	3	1/3	WACA Ground, Perth	Home	14 December 1979	Won	
4	150*	Pakistan	6	1	3/3	Gaddafi Stadium, Lahore	Away	18 March 1980	Drawn	
5	153	Pakistan	6	3	3/3	Gaddafi Stadium, Lahore	Away	18 March 1980	Drawn	
6	124	India	5	2	3/3	Melbourne Cricket Ground, Melbourne	Home	7 February 1981	Lost	
7	123*	England	5	4	5/6	Old Trafford, Manchester	Away	13 August 1981	Lost	
8	106*	England	5	1	6/6	Kennington Oval, London	Away	27 August 1981	Drawn	
9	126 ‡	West Indies	4	3	3/3	Adelaide Oval, Adelaide	Home	30 January 1982	Lost	
10	118	Pakistan	5	2	2/5	Brisbane Cricket Ground, Brisbane	Home	25 November 1983	Drawn	
11	117*	Pakistan	5	1	3/5	Adelaide Oval, Adelaide	Home	9 December 1983	Drawn	
12	100* ‡	West Indies	6	3	2/5	Queen's Park Oval, Port of Spain	Away	16 March 1984	Drawn	
13	196 † ‡	England	4	2	2/6	Lord's, London	Away	27 June 1985	Won	
14	146* †	England	4	3	4/6	Old Trafford Cricket Ground, Manchester	Away	1 August 1985	Drawn	
15	152* †	New Zealand	4	3	1/3	Brisbane Cricket Ground, Brisbane	Home	8 November 1985	Lost	
16	163 † ‡	India	3	3	2/3	Melbourne Cricket Ground, Melbourne	Home	26 December 1985	Drawn	
17	140 † ‡	New Zealand	4	1	2/3	Lancaster Park, Christchurch	Away	28 February 1986	Drawn	
18	114* † ‡	New Zealand	4	3	2/3	Lancaster Park, Christchurch	Away	28 February 1986	Drawn	
19	106 †	India	5	1	1/3	M. A. Chidambaram Stadium, Chennai	Away	18 September 1986	Tied	(Note: The match was a tie. There have been only two occasions where a Test match ended in a tie. The first was in 1960 and this match was the second of its kind.)
20	125 †	England	5	2	2/5	WACA Ground, Perth	Home	28 November 1986	Drawn	
21	100* † ‡	England	4	3	3/5	Adelaide Oval, Adelaide	Home	12 December 1986	Drawn	
22	205 † ‡	New Zealand	4	2	2/3	Adelaide Oval, Adelaide	Home	11 December 1987	Drawn	
23	113* † ‡	Pakistan	6	2	2/3	Iqbal Stadium, Faisalabad	Away	23 September 1988	Drawn	
24	106 † ‡	Sri Lanka	6	1	3/3	Tyronne Fernando Stadium, Moratuwa	Away	8 September 1992	Drawn	
25	110 †	West Indies	6	1	2/5	Melbourne Cricket Ground, Melbourne	Home	26 December 1992	Won	
26	200* † ‡	England	5	2	4/6	Headingley, Leeds	Away	22 July 1993	Won	
27	105 †	New Zealand	5	1	3/3	Brisbane Cricket Ground, Brisbane	Home	3 December 1993	Won	

== ODI cricket centuries ==
List of ODI centuries scored by Allan Border
No.	Score	Against	Pos.	Inn.	SR	Venue	H/A/N	Date	Result	Ref
1	105* ‡	India	2	2	86.06	Sydney Cricket Ground, Sydney	Home	18 December 1980	Won	
2	118* † ‡	Sri Lanka	4	1	134.09	Adelaide Oval, Adelaide	Home	28 January 1985	Won	
3	127* †	West Indies	4	1	90.71	Sydney Cricket Ground, Sydney	Home	6 February 1985	Won	
