= List of international cricket centuries by David Gower =

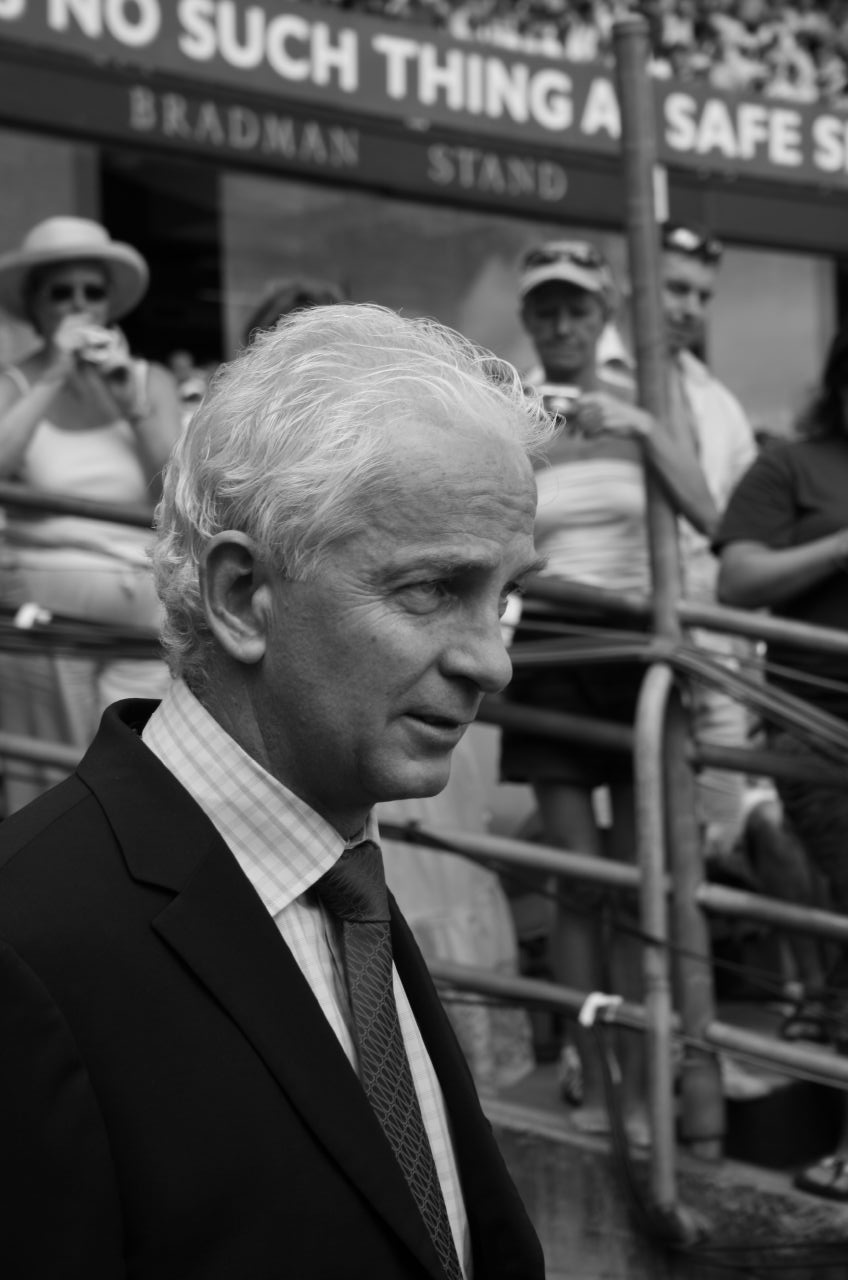
David Gower at the SCG in his commentator avatar post retirement c.2007

David Gower is an English former cricketer who batted with a graceful style as part of the top order for the England cricket team for over a decade. He scored centuries (100 or more runs in a single innings) on 18 occasions in Test cricket, and 7 times in One Day International (ODI) matches. He was named as a Wisden Cricketer of the Year in 1979 for his performances the previous year, which included being the youngest batsman to score a century for England since Peter May in 1951. He was appointed to the Order of the British Empire (OBE) in 1992 for services to sports, and in 2009 was inducted into the ICC Cricket Hall of Fame.

Gower made his Test debut for England in June 1978 against Pakistan at Edgbaston, Birmingham. He achieved his first century in Test cricket later that year, scoring 111 runs against New Zealand at The Oval, London. The following summer, Gower scored his first double-century, remaining unbeaten on 200 off 279 deliveries, in a batting innings described as "effortless" by the Wisden Cricketers' Almanack. He did not pass a hundred again until 1981, when he scored 154 not out against the West Indies, his runs coming off 403 deliveries at a strike rate of 38.21 – his lowest when scoring a century. Across 1984 and 1985, Gower struck five centuries in Test cricket, and on each occasion he passed 150 runs. Three of these centuries were scored during the 1985 Ashes, in which Gower was named as Man of the Series. In the fifth match he reached his highest score in Test cricket, amassing 215 runs and sharing a partnership of 331 with Tim Robinson. At the time, it was the sixth largest partnership for England, but in the next match Gower and Graham Gooch surpassed it, putting on 351 runs together. (Note: As of August 2022, Gower and Gooch's partnership of 351 is the eighth highest by England in Test cricket, while Gower and Robinson's 331 is the eleventh highest.) Gower's final Test century was scored in January 1991, when he reached 123 against Australia. In total, nine of Gower's eighteen Test centuries came during Ashes series, the fourth most by any batsman.

In ODI cricket, Gower's first century came in his second match for England, played against Pakistan in 1978, when he was 114 not out at the close of the innings. He was most prolific in 1983, when he scored four of his seven centuries in ODIs. Three of these centuries were scored against New Zealand during the 1982–83 World Series Cup, earning him the accolade of Man of the Preliminary Series. In the fourth match of the competition he scored 158 runs, which in the context of ODI cricket was both his highest score, and at the time, the highest score by any England batsman. (Note: As of August 2022, Gower's score of 158 is the sixth highest score by a batsman for England in ODIs.) Despite playing ODI cricket for England until 1991, Gower's final century in the format came in June 1985 against Australia, when he scored 102.

== Key ==
- * denotes that he remained not out.
- ‡ denotes that he was the captain of the England team in that match.
- ^{M} denotes that he was named Man of the match.
- Pos. denotes his position in the batting order.
- Test denotes the number of the Test match played in that series.
- Inn. denotes the number of innings in the match.
- H/A/N denotes whether the venue is home (England), away (opposition's home) or neutral.
- Date denotes the date on which the match began.
- Lost denotes that the match was lost by England.
- Won denotes that the match was won by England.
- Drawn denotes that the match was drawn.
- S/R denotes strike rate.

== Test centuries ==
No.	Score	Against	Pos.	Inn.	Test	Venue	H/A/N	Date	Result
1	111 ^{M}	New Zealand	4	2	1/3	The Oval, London	Home	27 July 1978	Won
2	102	Australia	5	1	2/6	Western Australian Cricket Association Ground, Perth	Away	15 December 1978	Won
3	200* ^{M}	India	5	1	1/4	Edgbaston, Birmingham	Home	12 July 1979	Won
4	154*	West Indies	4	3	5/5	Sabina Park, Kingston	Away	10 April 1981	Drawn
5	114	Australia	3	3	3/5	Adelaide Oval, Adelaide	Away	10 December 1982	Lost
6	112*	New Zealand	3	3	2/4	Headingley, Leeds	Home	28 July 1983	Lost
7	108 ^{M}	New Zealand	3	1	3/4	Lord's, London	Home	11 August 1983	Won
8	152 ‡ ^{M}	Pakistan	5	2	2/3	Iqbal Stadium, Faisalabad	Away	12 March 1984	Drawn
9	173* ‡	Pakistan	4	3	3/3	Gaddafi Stadium, Lahore	Away	19 March 1984	Drawn
10	166 ‡ ^{M}	Australia	3	1	3/6	Trent Bridge, Nottingham	Home	11 July 1985	Drawn
11	215 ‡	Australia	3	2	5/6	Edgbaston, Birmingham	Home	15 August 1985	Won
12	157 ‡	Australia	3	1	6/6	The Oval, London	Home	29 August 1985	Won
13	131	New Zealand	3	2	3/3	The Oval, London	Home	21 August 1986	Drawn
14	136	Australia	5	1	2/5	Western Australian Cricket Association Ground, Perth	Away	28 November 1986	Drawn
15	106 ‡	Australia	5	3	2/6	Lord's, London	Home	22 June 1989	Lost
16	157*	India	3	3	3/3	The Oval, London	Home	23 August 1990	Drawn
17	100	Australia	5	1	2/5	Melbourne Cricket Ground, Melbourne	Away	26 December 1990	Lost
18	123	Australia	5	2	3/5	Sydney Cricket Ground, Sydney	Away	4 January 1991	Drawn

== ODI centuries ==
No.	Score	Against	Pos.	Inn.	S/R	Venue	H/A/N	Date	Result
1	114* ^{M}	Pakistan	4	1	93.44	The Oval, London	Home	26 May 1978	Won
2	101* ^{M}	Australia	5	1	101.00	Melbourne Cricket Ground, Melbourne	Away	4 February 1979	Lost
3	122 ^{M}	New Zealand	1	2	91.04	Melbourne Cricket Ground, Melbourne	Neutral	13 January 1983	Lost
4	158 ^{M}	New Zealand	3	1	133.89	Brisbane Cricket Ground, Brisbane	Neutral	15 January 1983	Won
5	109	New Zealand	3	1	128.23	Adelaide Oval, Adelaide	Neutral	29 January 1983	Lost
6	130 ^{M}	Sri Lanka	3	1	108.33	County Ground, Taunton	Home	11 June 1983	Won
7	102 ‡ ^{M}	Australia	3	2	86.44	Lord's, London	Home	3 June 1985	Won

== Notes and references ==
Notes
