= Bruce Reid =

Australian cricketer (born 1963)

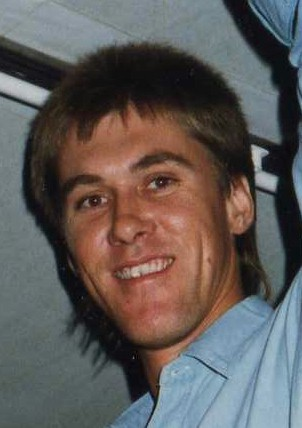
- Reid in Hong Kong, 1988

Personal information
- Full name: Bruce Anthony Reid
- Born: 14 March 1963 (age 63); Perth, Western Australia
- Height: 203 cm (6 ft 8 in)
- Batting: Left-handed
- Bowling: Left-arm fast-medium
- Role: Bowler
- Relatives: John Reid (cousin)

International information
- National side: Australia (1985–1992)
- Test debut (cap 334): December 1985 v India
- Last Test: November 1992 v West Indies
- ODI debut (cap 89): 9 January 1986 v New Zealand
- Last ODI: 18 March 1992 v West Indies

Domestic team information
- Years: Team
- 1984/85–1995/96: Western Australia

Career statistics
Competition	Test	ODI	FC	LA
Matches	27	61	96	96
Runs scored	93	49	503	104
Batting average	4.65	3.76	7.85	5.77
100s/50s	0/0	0/0	0/0	0/0
Top score	13	10	30	15*
Balls bowled	6,244	3,250	20,831	5,112
Wickets	113	63	350	106
Bowling average	24.63	34.96	26.63	30.65
5 wickets in innings	5	1	12	1
10 wickets in match	2	0	3	0
Best bowling	7/51	5/53	7/51	5/53
Catches/stumpings	5/–	6/–	19/–	11/–
Medal record
Men's Cricket
Representing Australia
ICC Cricket World Cup
Winner	1987 India and Pakistan
- Source: ESPNcricinfo, 12 December 2005

Bruce Anthony Reid (born 14 March 1963) is a former Australian international cricketer. A 203 cm (6 ft 8 in) tall left-arm fast-medium bowler, Reid also played domestically for his home state Western Australia. He was a part of the Australian team that won their first world title during the 1987 Cricket World Cup, and is the first Australian to take a hat-trick in the ODI format of the game.

== Playing career ==
Reid played for Western Australia in the Sheffield Shield from 1984–85 to 1995–96.

=== International career ===
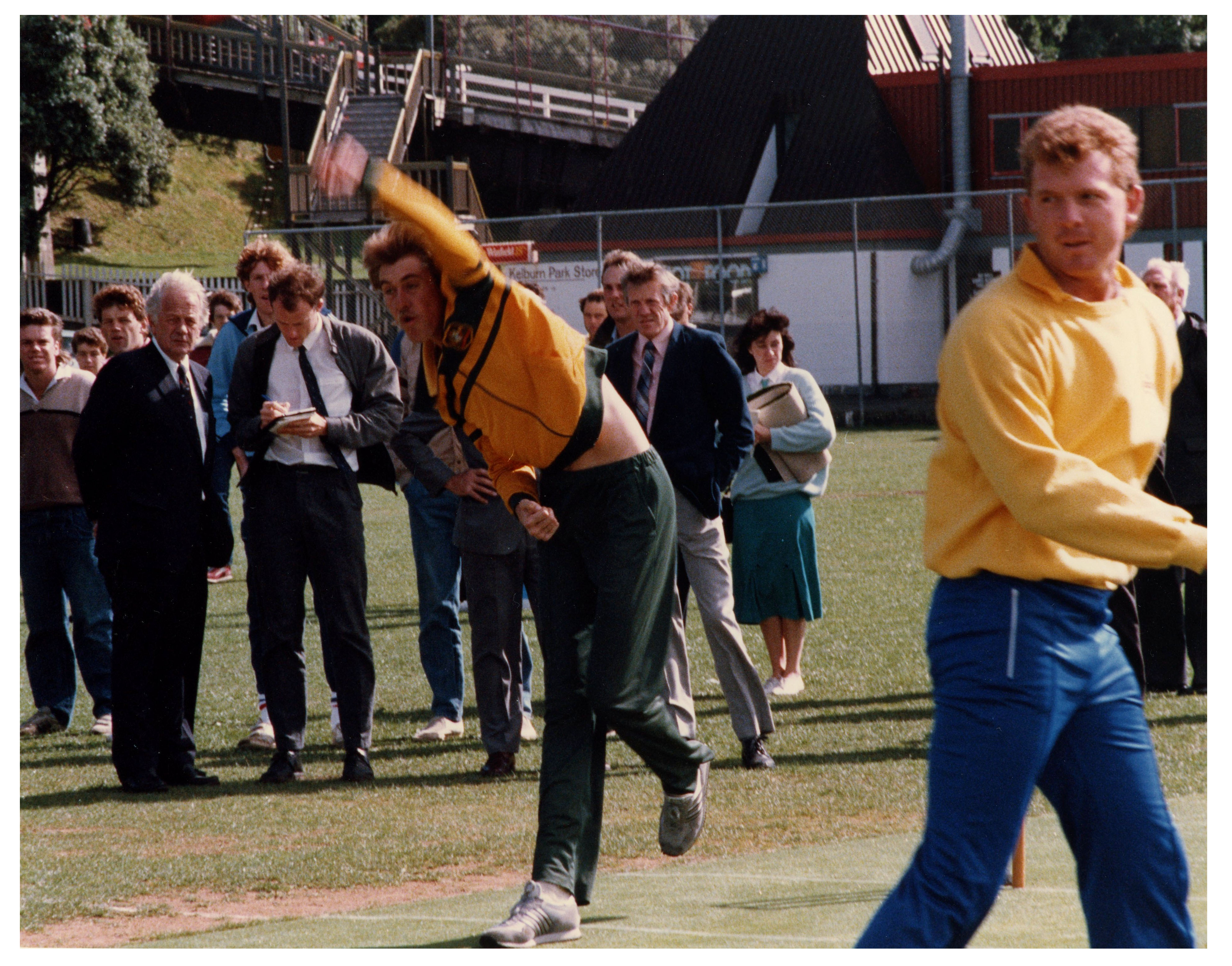
Reid (bowling, left) and Craig McDermott in Wellington, 1986

Reid represented Australia in Test cricket between December 1985 and December 1992 and in One Day Internationals between January 1986 and March 1992. He played 27 Test matches for Australia taking 113 Test wickets at an average of 24.63 runs per wicket. He also played 61 ODIs, taking 63 wickets.

Reid bowled left-arm fast-medium and had natural swing and an awkward angle of delivery. He achieved steepling bounce from his great height and was very accurate. Reid made his debut against India in January 1986. He was a mainstay of the Australian bowling attack from that time on. However, during Australia's tour of Pakistan in 1988 he suffered a back injury. Thereafter, Reid was frequently injured and was rarely fully fit, which limited his international career. In the 1990–91 Ashes series against England he took 27 wickets at an average of 16.00 in the first four Tests and won the award for player of the series, despite missing the last Test due to injury.

== Post-playing career ==
Since retirement as a player, Reid has developed a career as a bowling coach, and worked with teams around the world including the India cricket team (during the 2003–04 tour of Australia), the Zimbabwe national team and Hampshire County Cricket Club. He has also mentored Australian fast bowlers, including Nathan Bracken.

== Personal life ==
Reid was born in Osborne Park, a suburb of Perth, Western Australia. He was a cousin of New Zealand batsman John Reid. At 203 cm (6 ft 8 in) tall, Reid is same height as former West Indian fast bowler Joel Garner. Until the appearance of 216 cm (7 ft 1 in) tall Pakistani left-arm fast bowler Mohammad Irfan in 2010, Reid and Garner were the tallest players ever to have played international cricket.
