= David Gower =

English cricket player (born 1957)

David Gower OBE
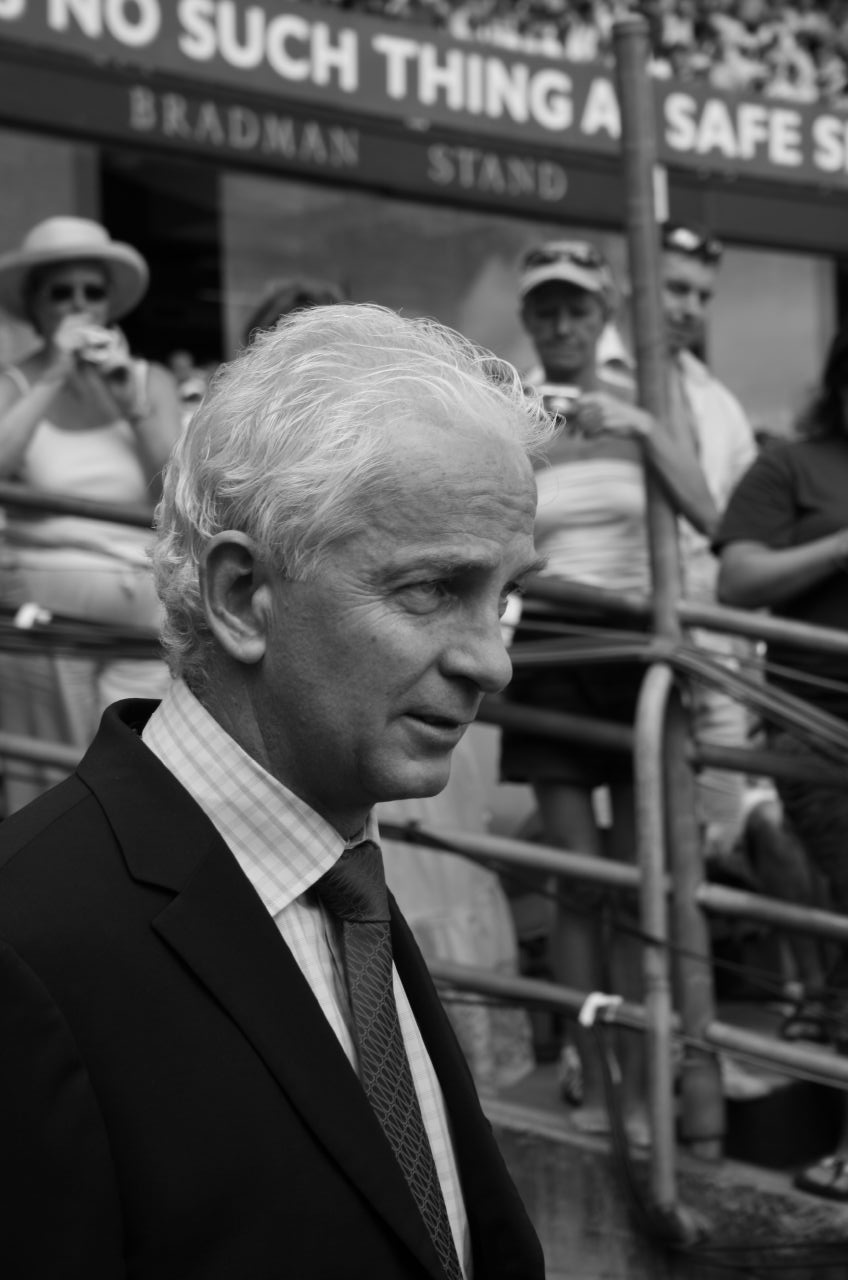
- Gower, photographed in 2007

Personal information
- Full name: David Ivon Gower
- Born: 1 April 1957 (age 69); Tunbridge Wells, Kent, England
- Height: 5 ft 11 in (1.80 m)
- Batting: Left-handed
- Bowling: Right arm off break
- Role: Batsman
- Relatives: John Ronald Gower (uncle)

International information
- National side: England (1978–1992)
- Test debut (cap 479): 1 June 1978 v Pakistan
- Last Test: 9 August 1992 v Pakistan
- ODI debut (cap 46): 24 May 1978 v Pakistan
- Last ODI: 16 February 1991 v New Zealand

Domestic team information
- Years: Team
- 1975–1989: Leicestershire
- 1990–1993: Hampshire

Career statistics
Competition	Test	ODI	FC	LA
Matches	117	114	448	430
Runs scored	8,231	3,170	26,339	12,255
Batting average	44.25	30.77	40.08	33.30
100s/50s	18/39	7/12	53/136	19/56
Top score	215	158	228	158
Balls bowled	36	5	260	20
Wickets	1	0	4	0
Bowling average	20.00	–	56.75	–
5 wickets in innings	0	–	0	–
10 wickets in match	0	–	0	–
Best bowling	1/1	–	3/47	–
Catches/stumpings	74/–	44/–	280/1	162/–
Medal record
Men's Cricket
Representing England
ICC Cricket World Cup
Runner-up	1979 England
- Source: CricketArchive, 1 September 2007

David Ivon Gower (born 1 April 1957) is an English cricket commentator and former cricketer who was captain of the England cricket team during the 1980s. Described as one of the most stylish left-handed batsmen of his era, Gower played 117 Test matches and 114 One Day Internationals (ODI) scoring 8,231 and 3,170 runs, respectively. He was one of the most capped and high-scoring players for England during this period, and only Jack Hobbs made more runs against Australia than Gower's 3,269. He was a part of the English squad which finished as runners-up at the 1979 Cricket World Cup.

Gower led England during the 1985 Ashes, and his team was victorious; however, two 5–0 whitewashes against the West Indies (in 1984 and 1985–86) reflected poorly on his captaincy, and Gower was replaced in 1986. He was briefly reinstated for the 1989 Ashes series, before being replaced as captain by Graham Gooch. The strained relationship between the pair contributed to Gower retiring from international cricket in 1993. Nevertheless, he ended with an impressive record in first-class cricket, accumulating 26,339 runs at an average of 40.08, and 53 centuries. As of February 2021, he held the record of 119 consecutive innings without registering a duck in Test cricket. Following his retirement, Gower became a successful cricket commentator with Sky Sports, and on 16 July 2009 he was inducted into the ICC Cricket Hall of Fame.

On the occasion of England's 1000th Test in August 2018, he was named in the country's greatest Test XI by the ECB.

== Early life ==
Gower was born in Tunbridge Wells in 1957. His father, Richard Gower OBE, was working for the Colonial Service in a position in Dar es Salaam, capital of the then British-administered territory of Tanganyika Territory, where Gower spent his early childhood. The family returned to England after Tanganyika was granted independence, when Gower was six years old, settling in Kent and later moving to Loughborough. Gower attended prep school at Marlborough House School in Hawkhurst from the age of 8 to that of 13, where he leaned towards cricket as his preferred sport.

He was awarded a scholarship to attend The King's School in Canterbury – where his father had once been head boy – as a boarder. Gower made the school cricket First XI aged 14, and was later made captain. He also played for the rugby First XV before being dropped from the team for "lack of effort". While at school, Gower played representative cricket for Public Schools against English Schools at under-16 level.

Gower finished school with eight O levels, three A levels and one S level in history. He sat the History exam for Oxford University and was offered an interview at St Edmund Hall, but missed a place. Spurning a place at University College London, Gower returned to school in an attempt to gain two more A levels but lost interest partway through the year. Having played some matches for the Leicestershire Second XI the previous summer, Gower tried his luck at the club as a professional for the remainder of the year, for £25 per week. In the summer, Gower returned to University College, where he studied law, but after six months he returned to professional cricket.

Gower is nicknamed "Lord Gower" by his Sky Sports colleagues, in allusion to his aristocratic ancestry and public school education. As a member of the Gower family formerly of Glandovan, he is a distant cousin of the Leveson-Gower family, Dukes of Sutherland. Per Gower's autobiography, An Endangered Species, "there was reckoned to be land in the family in Pembrokeshire two or three generations earlier, which an errant ancestor gambled away in a moment of boredom, and a connection with a place called Castell Malgwyn, now a country house hotel, in Cardigan."

== Playing career ==
Gower enjoyed one of the most prolific first-class cricket careers in English history, in both domestic and international competitions. Gower's career run total in test matches of 8,231 is the fifth-highest by an English player, behind only Alec Stewart with 8,463, Graham Gooch with 8,900, Sir Alastair Cook with 12,472 and Joe Root (still active) with 14,075. He played domestic cricket from 1975 until 1993, largely with Leicestershire until 1989, when he moved to Hampshire. He was a stalwart batsman at both clubs.

=== Domestic career ===
Gower made his debut for Leicestershire on 30 July 1975, during that season's County Championship, against Lancashire at Stanley Park, Blackpool. Winning the toss, Lancashire chose to bat first and amassed 259, thanks largely to a century by David Lloyd, who would later become Gower's co-commentator. Gower, batting at number seven, scored 32 before he was dismissed by Ken Shuttleworth, Leicestershire making 321 and taking a first-innings lead. Lloyd made 90 in the second innings as Lancashire declared on 305, with Gower taking one catch to dismiss Jack Simmons for 17. The match, lasting only three days with 100 overs as a maximum limit imposed on both teams for each innings, ended in a draw, with Leicestershire reaching 90 without Gower getting to bat again. Gower continued to make little impression during the rest of the 1975 season, playing in only two more matches and ending the season with 65 runs at 13.00. He enjoyed greater success in his debut List A season, playing in eight matches, scoring 175 runs at 25.00 with two fifties.

Gower was retained for the 1976 season, however, playing in a total of seven first-class matches. He enjoyed greater success, with 323 runs at 35.88 including a maiden century, 102*, and a second fifty. In one-day cricket he played another eight matches, scoring 188 runs at 23.50 with a season–high score of 48. The 1977 season saw Gower play 25 matches, with another career-best of 144*, his only century of the season. He amassed 745 runs at 23.28, with three other half-centuries. In the one-day format he was far more prolific, playing 24 matches and scoring 867 with a best of 135*, one of two hundreds that year, along with four fifties, all at 48.16. After two first-class matches against Sri Lankan domestic teams over the winter of 1977–78, in which he scored 76 runs at 38.00 in first-class and a score of 22 in the only one-day fixture, Gower topped 1,000 runs in a season for the first time in his career, scoring 1098 runs at 37.86 including two hundreds, five fifties and a call-up to the national team.

Gower returned to England in 1978 from an international tour with a career-best 200*, forming part of his 957 runs for the season at 41.60, with eight fifties to go with that one hundred. For his efforts that season, Gower was awarded Wisden Cricketer of the Year. Wisden recorded that "The sun scarcely graced the English cricket scene with its presence in 1978, but when it did it seemed to adorn the blond head of David Gower. The young Leicestershire left-hander could do little wrong. He typified a new, precocious breed of stroke-players, imperious and exciting, who added colour and glamour to an otherwise bedraggled English summer." The 1980 season in England saw Gower again top 1,000 runs, with 1142 at 48.89, including five hundreds and a career-best 156*. This was, thus far, the most prolific first-class season of Gower's career. He also played 21 one-day matches, with 616 runs including another century. He followed up the winter international tour with a prolific performance during the 1981 season, which included the 1981 Ashes series. During this season Gower played 19 matches, scoring a career-best 1,418 runs at 48.89, including one knock of 156*. Against Essex at Grace Road he shared an unbroken county record second-wicket stand of 289 with Chris Balderstone.

After another successful international tour, Gower returned to England to breach 1,000 runs again with a career-best 1,530 at 46.36, with two hundreds, and scored five further hundreds for only the second time in 1983, when he again topped 1,000 runs, 1,253 this time at 46.40. He narrowly failed to reach 1,000 runs in the 1984 season, ending with 999 at 35.67, and then scored 1,000 runs, including a then career-best of 215, at 54.70, in 1985. Gower scored one century in England and Australia in the next two seasons, before topping 1,000 runs for three consecutive series, in 1987, 1988 and 1989, with a total of seven centuries including his career-best 228.

In 1989 he moved to Hampshire, and upon returning from the 1989–90 tour of the West Indies, where he scored only four in one match, he scored 1,263 runs for his new club at 46.77, and he scored 1,142, 1,225 and 1,136 in his final three seasons, ending his last, 1993, with four centuries at 42.07. This was despite Gower being, at times, so out-of-form that Brian Mason, a personal counsellor, was asked to work with him on his poor form. His final three seasons had seen poorer returns in one-day cricket, with his last century coming in 1992, and with his final season returning 347 runs at 26.69. In his final first-class match, Gower faced Essex at Chelmsford on 16 September 1993. Batting at number four, he made a farewell century of 134 before he was stumped in the first innings, and with future captain Nasser Hussain and then captain Graham Gooch both making centuries as Essex fell short of Hampshire's 347 with their own innings of 268, Gower came out to bat for the final time in Hampshire's second innings. He made 25. Gooch, at that time the England captain, having succeeded Gower, came back onto the field for Essex to score his second century of the match.

=== International career ===
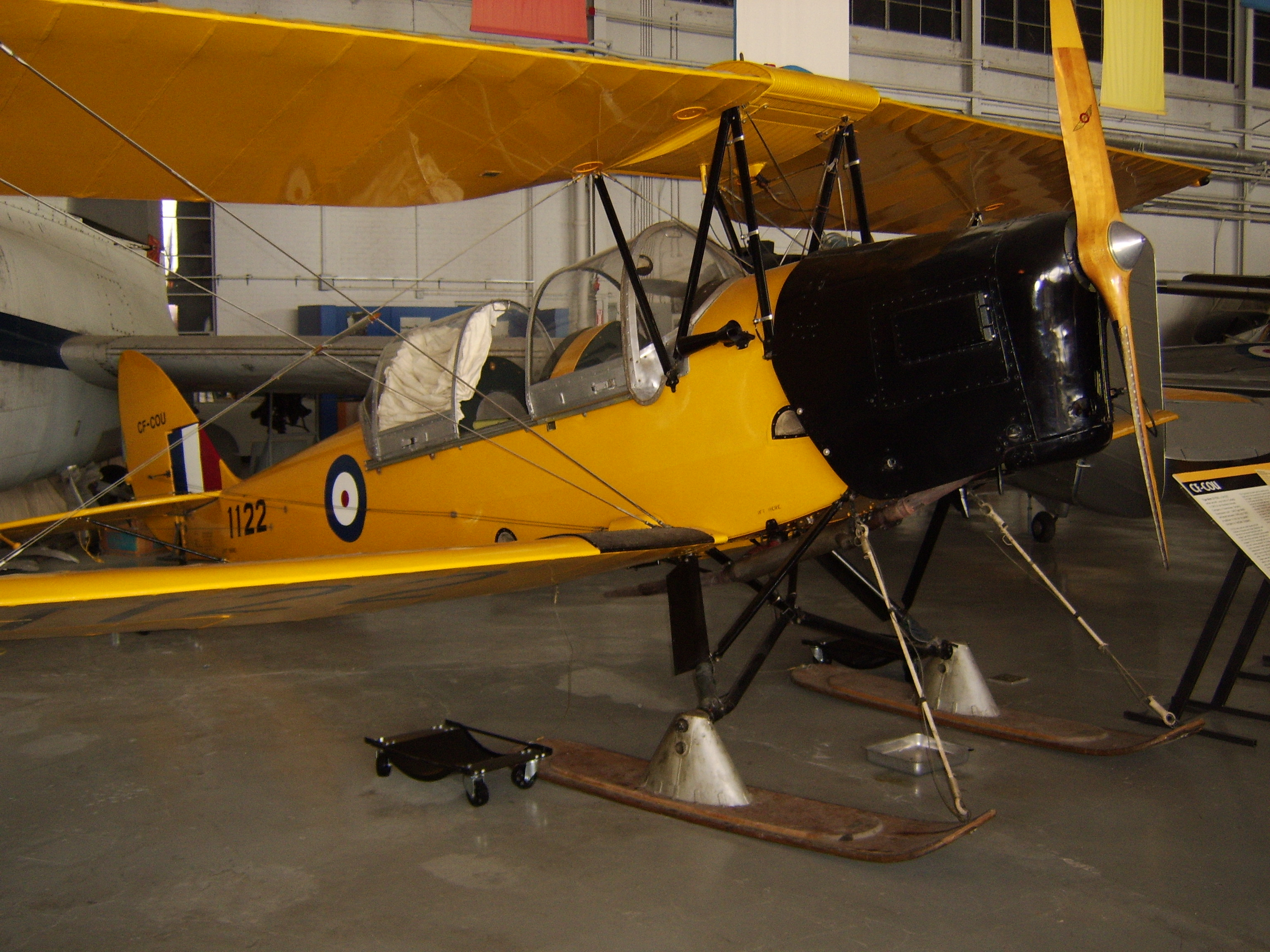
Despite a prolific scoring career, Gower is often best remembered for his languid, laid-back approach both on and off the field. In 1991 he buzzed an England warm-up match with a biplane, an action for which he was reprimanded.

Gower was selected to play for the England Young Cricketers in 1976 against the West Indies equivalent team. Gower played one match, on 27 August, at the Queen's Park Oval in Port of Spain. Opening the batting, Gower made only 10 runs in the first innings as England were bowled out for 164; after the West Indies had made 201, he scored 49 in the second innings, stumped off a spin bowler. England were dismissed for 202, and bowled the West Indies out for 143 to take a 22-run victory. He made his debut in Test cricket in 1978 at Edgbaston, scoring a boundary via a pull shot off his first delivery, bowled by Pakistan's Liaqat Ali. He went on to make 58 in England's only innings, followed by 56 at Lord's and 39 at Headingley. On 27 July, Gower played against New Zealand, scoring his maiden Test hundred, 111 off of 253 deliveries in the first innings, and making 11 in the second. He made scores of 46, 71 and 46 in the rest of the series, the latter including his first Test six, earning him selection for the following Ashes Tests in Australia.

Gower might have been more at home in the 1920s or 1930s, cracking a dashing hundred for MCC, the darling of the crowds, before speeding away in a Bugatti and cravat for a night on the town.

— Scyld Berry on Gower, The Observer, 1984

Gower made his Ashes début at the Gabba, Brisbane, on 1 December 1978. He made 44 and 48* in the first Test, before making his maiden Ashes hundred, 102 from 221 balls at Perth. These were to be his only significant contributions, however, and he saw out the rest of the series with scores of 29, 49, 7, 34, 9 and 21, until a meticulous 65 in the final Test at Sydney. He then faced four Test matches against India over the summer of 1979, beginning the series with a fast-paced 200* at Edgbaston, followed by an 82 at Lord's. Ducks at Leeds and The Oval followed, however, and he struggled against Australia in the winter of 1979 with 17, 23 and three. A battling 98* at Sydney was again followed by another duck and 11 as Gower's form deserted him. After 16 against India in February 1980, and 20 and one against the West Indies, his form picked up marginally with scores of 45, 35 and 48 against Australia and the West Indies. One more fifty followed at Bridgetown; however, he eventually broke the run of poor form with a hard-fought 154* from 403 deliveries at Kingston.

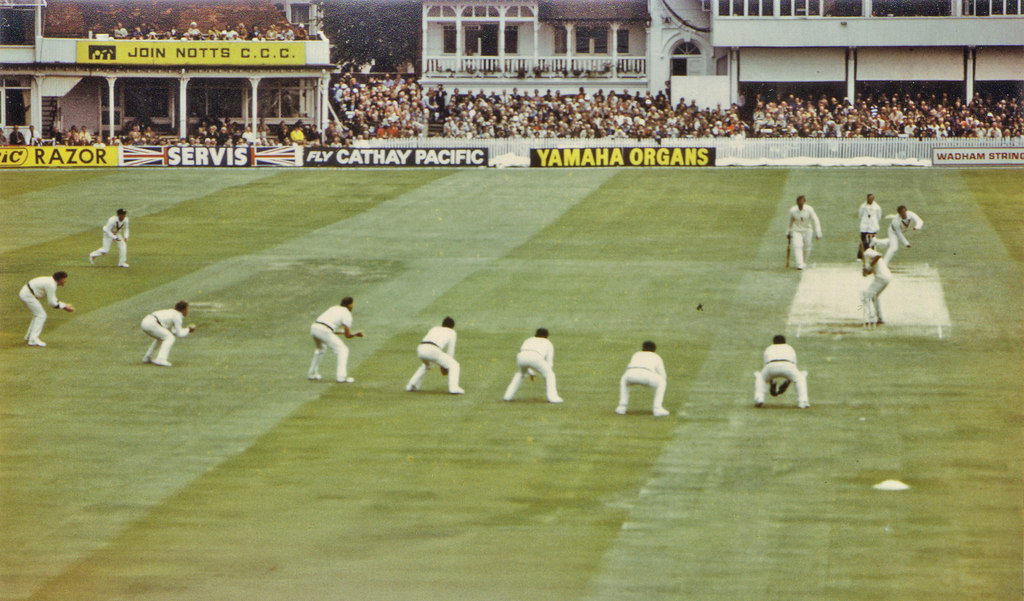
Gower batting for England in a Test match at Trent Bridge in 1981. Terry Alderman is bowling, with Ian Botham at the bowler's end. There are four slips and two gulleys fielding to the left of Rod Marsh. Despite one score of 89 during the series, Gower had failed to consistently perform, and thus the Australian team set this very attacking field.

Gower's timely revival of form ensured his selection for the 1981 Ashes series; however, apart from an 89 at Lord's, Gower failed to convert the success he was having in the domestic game to the Test matches, with many scores in the twenties or lower. Two scores in the eighties against India, one against Sri Lanka and two seventies against Pakistan over the winter of 1981/82 kept in him contention for an international place, but centuries were lacking in his game. In August 1982, however, Australia received the England touring team at Perth, where Gower made 72 and 28. He followed this with 18, 34 and 60 at Brisbane and Adelaide before a compact 114 in the second innings of the Adelaide match revived his hundred count. Two more hundreds in the summer of 1983 against New Zealand, and knocks of 152 and 173* against Pakistan in 1984 ensured his place in the side.

Following his 173* in the last Test against Pakistan, Gower suffered another drop in form, managing only three fifties in the next 18 Test innings against the West Indies, Sri Lanka and India. In 1985, however, after low scores at Leeds, Gower enjoyed a "golden season" in the 1985 Ashes. He scored 86 and 22 at Lord's against Australia, and 166 at Trent Bridge. Following this, he scored 47 at Old Trafford, and then at Edgbaston on 15 August, scored 215 from 314 balls, his career-best score, and immediately followed this with 157 at The Oval. In addition, he forged two partnerships over 300 runs, with 331 scored with Tim Robinson (148) during Gower's own double-century, and 351 with Gooch's 196 at The Oval. He ended the series with 732 runs at 81.33, leading England to a 3–1 victory.

Gower struggled in 1986. His mother had died a week before he left to captain the England tour to the West Indies which ended in a 5–0 defeat (Gower's second at their hands). Back in England against India, Gower lost the captaincy after two Tests both of which were lost. Retained as a senior player for the New Zealand series and the subsequent Ashes tour, his fortunes began to turn in December with 136 against Australia at Perth.

In 1987 Gower declined to play in that year's Cricket World Cup for he did not wish to travel, having been on nine successive winter tours since his debut. He never again declined an opportunity to play for England; yet, in 1989, rumours that Gower lacked serious commitment gained currency when, as England captain, he walked out of a press conference claiming he had tickets for the theatre.

More controversially, during the 1990–91 Ashes Tour in Australia, England were playing a warm up match in Queensland when Gower, together with batsman John Morris, chose to go for a joy-ride in two Tiger Moth biplanes without telling the England team management. Both had been dismissed earlier that day, and they decided not to remain at the ground to "watch Allan Lamb and Robin Smith flat the Queensland attack before a small crowd". For this Gower was fined £1,000, a penalty that could have been steeper had he released the water bombs he had also prepared. He also posed for press photographs with the plane the next day.

Gooch was enraged, as he was by Gower's mode of dismissal at a crucial stage of one of the Test matches. During the fourth Test at Adelaide, Gower walked out to the crease to the tune of Those Magnificent Men in their Flying Machines. The last ball before lunch was bowled down the leg side to a leg trap, and all Gower needed to do was block. However, Gower flicked idly at the delivery and was caught at leg-slip. According to Mike Atherton in his autobiography, "Gooch was at the other end and as he walked off his face was thunderous". This was another example of the strained relationship between the two. His score of nought in the second innings at Melbourne in 1991, when England were chasing quick runs for victory, ended his world record, unbroken sequence, of 119 Test innings without registering a duck. Gower scored 73 and 31* in the following matches against Pakistan; however, on 9 August 1992 he was dismissed for one by Waqar Younis in what would be his last Test match, at The Oval. It is often thought that Gooch was instrumental in Gower being omitted from the subsequent tour of India. The selection decision prompted a vote of no confidence in the selectors at the Marylebone Cricket Club (MCC), but it was to no avail as Gower was not included. In response to Gooch's perceived regime of hard work over talent, Gower retired from international cricket in early 1993.

=== Playing style ===
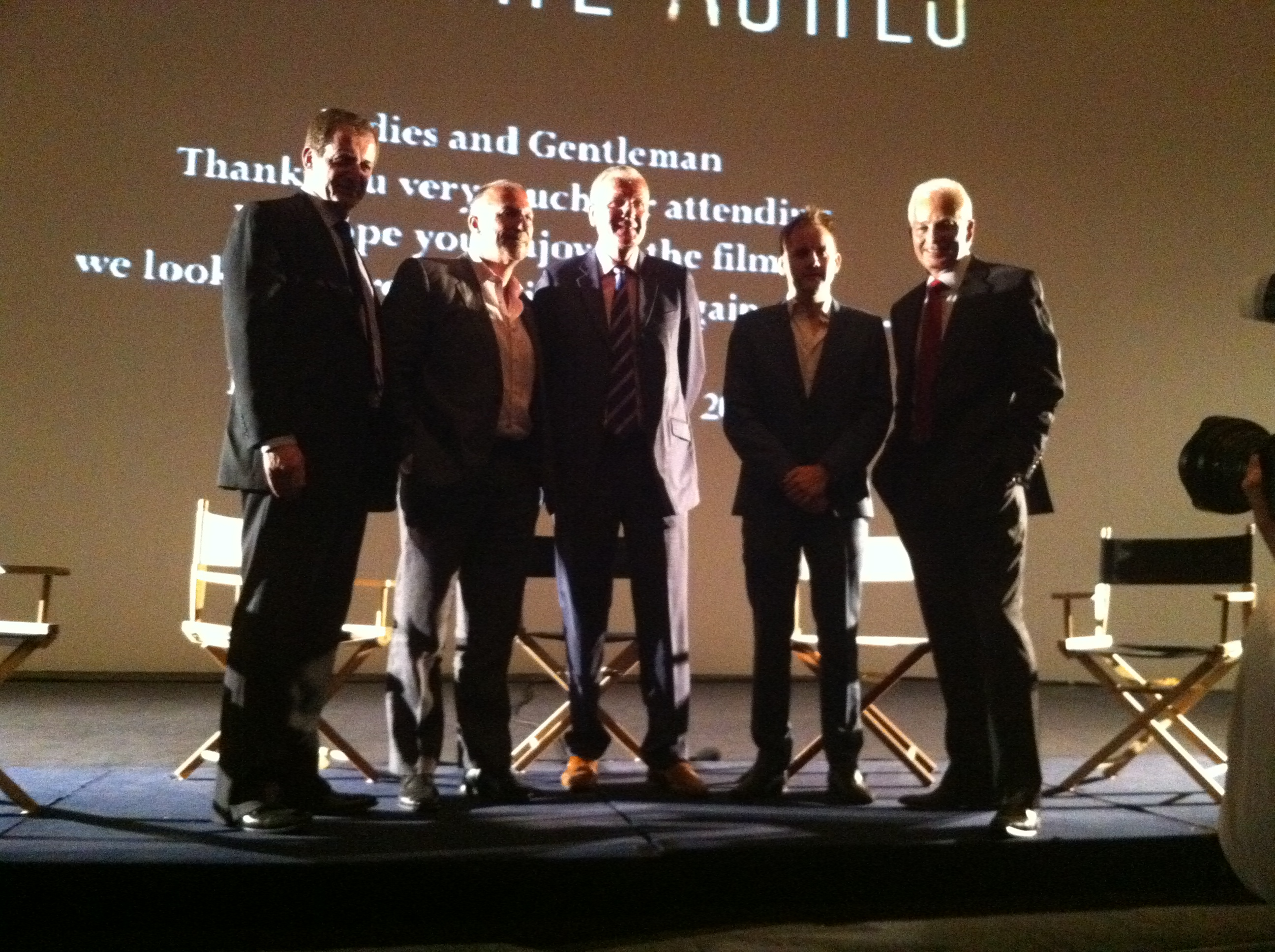
Gower (far right) with fellow commentators Willis and Botham, politicians Alastair Campbell and James Erskine

Gower, a left-handed batsman, played with a dominant top hand and a "most graceful" style of batting though he had a reputation for being aloof. His languid style was often misinterpreted as indifference and a lack of seriousness, an air he bolstered with a variety of "misdemeanours" from apparently "lazy" shots, to practical jokes, even to his preference for blue (not white) socks. Wisden described him as "fluffy-haired, ethereal-looking" who played "beautifully, until the moment he made a mistake. Sometimes, the mistake was put off long enough for him to play an innings of unforgettable brilliance."

At times Gower's habit of getting out just when he ought to have been settling in may have frustrated fans and selectors, but in half-hour highlight-package terms he was worth a dozen Allan Borders and a hundred Geoffrey Boycotts.

— The Guardian on Gower.

Gower was repeatedly lambasted by the media as being "laid back" or "nonchalant" with a "devil-may-care" approach some found infuriating, as Wisden records, "the difference between an exquisite stroke and a nick was little more than an inch" in his style of batting. Peter Roebuck recorded that "Gower never moves, he drifts", while Frances Edmonds in the Daily Express spoke of Gower in 1985: "Difficult to be more laid back without being actually comatose." Gower himself commented in 1995 in an interview in The Independent: "I was never destined to be on the ball 100 per cent of the time. I don't have the same ability that Graham Gooch has, to produce something very close to his best every time he plays. There were Test matches where I suddenly felt, at the end of it, 'Well, I wish I'd really been at that one.'"

Gower was also a right-arm off break spin bowler despite batting left-handed, who took one Test wicket at 20.00 out of the six overs he sent down on the rare occasions when he was called upon to bowl. His domestic cricket added another three wickets to give him an overall average of 56.75; however, Martin Williamson, the managing editor of Cricinfo, records Gower and James Whitaker as "probably two of the worst bowlers in the country" in 1983. On one occasion, during Steve O'Shaughnessy's 35-minute century for Lancashire, Gower conceded 102 for 0 from nine overs. In the 1986 Test against New Zealand at Trent Bridge, Gower became the only England bowler to be called for throwing in a Test in England. Handed the ball by captain Mike Gatting with New Zealand requiring only one run to win, Gower deliberately threw his first ball to Martin Crowe. Technically the game ended with the no-ball call, but Crowe hit a four off the ball which was permitted to stand, leaving Gower with the unusual match bowling figures of 0-0-4-0 (1nb).

In the field, Gower is noted by biographer Kersi Meher-Homji as being a "magnificent outfielder who took amazing catches and threw with accuracy and power to run out the blasé batsman." Ambidextrous in the field and when bowling, Gower also plays both golf and hockey, writes and kicks right-handed. However, he was far less effective as a fielder late in his career, especially in one-day matches, since a chronic shoulder injury – usually described as the shoulder being "thrown out" – meant that he usually bowled the ball in when fielding, rather than throwing it in, significantly reducing the speed of the return and allowing batsmen easy runs.

== Commentating ==
It's the old'uns versus the young'uns, Ian and myself versus Nasser and Mike. There's a lot of cross-generational banter as well as pure dressing-room banter. It helps pass the time of day, really.

— Gower on Sky commentary

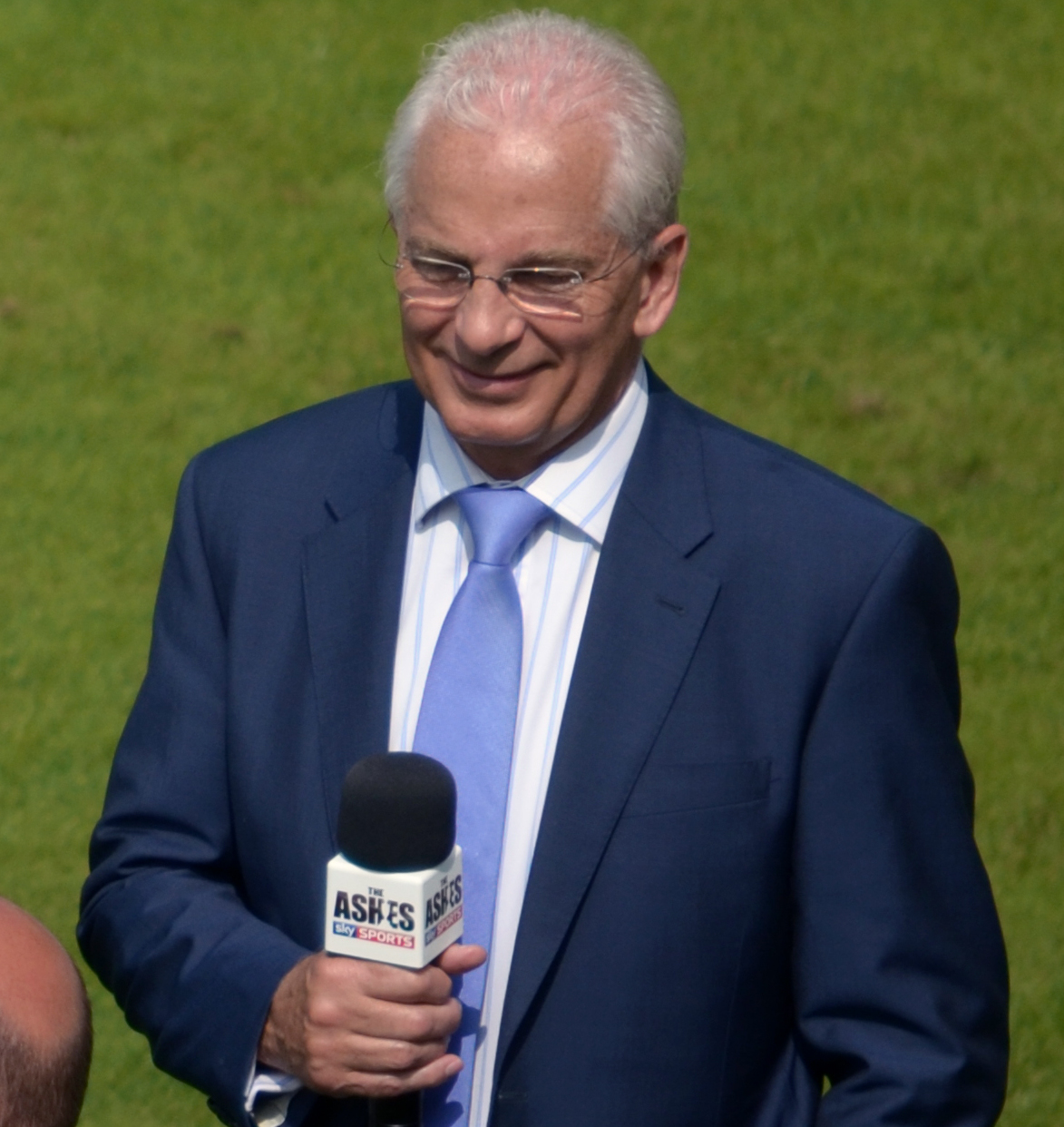
Gower working for Sky Sports during the 2013 Ashes series

After leaving the game, Gower enjoyed a new career as a cricket broadcaster and television personality, including being one of the team captains on the popular BBC comedy sports quiz They Think It's All Over from 1995 to 2003. He also presented four series of the BBC2 cricket magazine show, Gower's Cricket Monthly, from 1995 to 1998, and, at the same time was one of the BBC's main cricket commentators. Gower also spent time commentating on several cricket series in Australia in the 1990s. His commentary for Channel Nine, with his trademark relaxed calls of play and generous attitude to the players and fellow commentators, proved extremely popular with Australian cricket viewing audiences.

Gower was the main presenter of international cricket coverage for Sky Sports and a regular commentator for many years until 2019 when Sky decided not to renew his contract. Matthew Engel of Cricinfo wrote that Gower's commentating career has been "so successful that his cricket seemed mere preparation". Gower returned to commentary for BT Sport in the 2021–22 Ashes series. Alan Tyers of The Daily Telegraph wrote that it had been "excellent having Lord Gower back on the cricket commentary: assured, amusing, urbane. And always a steelier character than his insouciance suggested [...] perhaps he might even be enjoying reminding his former employers at Sky that he is still a quality broadcaster."

== Later life and interests ==
Gower is interested in conservation. In 1989, he joined Gerald Durrell and his wife Lee, along with David Attenborough, in helping to launch the World Land Trust (then the World Wide Land Conservation Trust). The initial goal of the trust was to purchase rainforest land in Belize as part of the Programme for Belize. Gower is also a Patron of the David Shepherd Wildlife Foundation, and he is vice-president of the Nature in Art Trust,. In 1992, he was named an Officer of the Most Excellent Order of the British Empire (OBE). In 1994, he received an Honorary Master of Arts award from Loughborough University.

Gower is also a director of an Internet wine company. Gower and his wife, Thorunn, are Patrons of Southampton-based charity Leukaemia Busters. He was also awarded the "Oldie of the Year" award in 1993 by The Oldie magazine. He is the author of a number of written works on cricket, including Gower: The Autobiography with The Independent journalist Martin Johnson in 1992, David Gower: With Time to Spare with Alan Lee in 1995 and Can't Bat, Can't Bowl, Can't Field also with Johnson. In 2009, Gower was inducted into the ICC Hall of Fame.

In August 2014, Gower was one of 200 public figures who signed a letter to The Guardian opposing Scottish independence in the run-up to September's referendum on that issue.

== See also ==
- List of international cricket centuries by David Gower

== Notes ==
Sporting positions
Preceded by Bob Willis; Mike Gatting	England cricket captain 1983/4–1986; 1989	Succeeded by Mike Gatting; Graham Gooch
