= 10,000 club =

10,000 club may refer to:

- List of players who have scored 10,000 or more runs in Test cricket
- List of players who have scored 10,000 or more runs in One Day International cricket
- List of NFL career rushing yards leaders#Players with at least 10,000 rushing yards
