= English cricket team in the West Indies in 2018–19 =

International cricket tour

	West Indies	England
- Dates: 15 January – 10 March 2019
Captains	Jason Holder (Note: Kraigg Brathwaite captained the West Indies for the third Test.)	Joe Root (Tests); Eoin Morgan (ODIs & T20Is)

Test series
- Result: West Indies won the 3-match series 2–1
Most runs	Jason Holder (229)	Ben Stokes (186)
Most wickets	Kemar Roach (18)	Moeen Ali (14)
- Player of the series: Kemar Roach (WI)

One Day International series
- Results: 5-match series drawn 2–2
Most runs	Chris Gayle (424)	Eoin Morgan (256)
Most wickets	Oshane Thomas (9)	Adil Rashid (9)
- Player of the series: Chris Gayle (WI)

Twenty20 International series
- Results: England won the 3-match series 3–0
Most runs	Nicholas Pooran (70)	Jonny Bairstow (117)
Most wickets	Sheldon Cottrell (4)	Chris Jordan (6); David Willey (6)
- Player of the series: Chris Jordan (Eng)

The England cricket team toured the West Indies between January and March 2019 to play three Tests, five One Day Internationals (ODIs) and three Twenty20 International (T20I) matches. The series included England's first Test match in Saint Lucia, when they played at the Daren Sammy Cricket Ground. It was also England's first tour to the West Indies to play all three formats of international cricket since they visited in 2009. The ODI fixtures were part of both teams' preparation for the 2019 Cricket World Cup.

The West Indies won the first two Test matches, taking an unassailable lead in the series, and therefore winning the Wisden Trophy. It was their first Test series win against England since 2009. However, the West Indies captain Jason Holder was suspended for the third and final Test of the series, after the team's slow over-rate in the second Test. Kraigg Brathwaite was named as the West Indies' captain for the third Test in Holder's place. The West Indies won the series 2–1, after England won the third Test by 232 runs.

During the ODI series, multiple individual and team records were broken by both sides. England's captain Eoin Morgan became the first batsman for the England team to score 6,000 runs in ODIs. Chris Gayle became the second batsman for the West Indies, after Brian Lara, to score 10,000 runs in ODIs. The ODI series was drawn 2–2, after the third match was washed out, finishing as a no result.

For the T20I series, the West Indies retained players that were selected for the ODI matches, with Jason Holder named as the T20I captain in place of their regular T20I captain Carlos Brathwaite. During the second match, the West Indies were bowled out for 45, which was the second-lowest total in T20Is and the lowest by a Full Member nation. England won the T20I series 3–0.

== Squads ==
Tests		ODIs		T20Is	
West Indies	England	West Indies	England	West Indies	England
Jason Holder (c); Kraigg Brathwaite; Darren Bravo; Shamarh Brooks; John Campbell; Roston Chase; Shane Dowrich (wk); Shannon Gabriel; Shimron Hetmyer; Shai Hope (wk); Alzarri Joseph; Keemo Paul; Kemar Roach; Oshane Thomas; Jomel Warrican	Joe Root (c); Jos Buttler (vc); Moeen Ali; James Anderson; Jonny Bairstow (wk); Stuart Broad; Rory Burns; Sam Curran; Joe Denly; Ben Foakes (wk); Keaton Jennings; Jack Leach; Adil Rashid; Ben Stokes; ~~Olly Stone~~; Chris Woakes; Mark Wood	Jason Holder (c); Fabian Allen; Devendra Bishoo; Carlos Brathwaite; Darren Bravo; John Campbell; Sheldon Cottrell; Shannon Gabriel; Chris Gayle; Shimron Hetmyer; Shai Hope; Evin Lewis; Ashley Nurse; Keemo Paul; Nicholas Pooran; Rovman Powell; ~~Kemar Roach~~; Andre Russell; Oshane Thomas	Eoin Morgan (c); Jos Buttler (vc, wk); Moeen Ali; Jonny Bairstow; Tom Curran; Joe Denly; Alex Hales; Liam Plunkett; Adil Rashid; Joe Root; Jason Roy; Ben Stokes; David Willey; Chris Woakes; Mark Wood	Jason Holder (c); Fabian Allen; Devendra Bishoo; Carlos Brathwaite; Darren Bravo; John Campbell; Sheldon Cottrell; Chris Gayle; Shimron Hetmyer; Shai Hope; Obed McCoy; Ashley Nurse; Nicholas Pooran; Oshane Thomas	Eoin Morgan (c); ~~Moeen Ali~~; Jonny Bairstow (wk); Sam Billings; Sam Curran; Tom Curran; Joe Denly; Alex Hales; Chris Jordan; Dawid Malan; Liam Plunkett; Adil Rashid; Joe Root; David Willey; Mark Wood

Olly Stone was ruled out of England's Test squad with a back injury, and was replaced in the squad by Mark Wood. Ahead of the second Test, England's Adil Rashid flew home to attend the birth of his second child. Keemo Paul was added to the West Indies' squad for the third Test, after Jason Holder was suspended.

Shannon Gabriel was not originally named in the West Indies' ODI squad, but was added to the team after injuries to Rovman Powell and Keemo Paul. However, during the third Test, Gabriel was heard saying a homophobic remark towards England's captain Joe Root. As a result, the International Cricket Council (ICC) suspended Gabriel for four ODI matches. John Campbell, Carlos Brathwaite and Sheldon Cottrell were added to the West Indies' ODI squad, following injuries to Evin Lewis, Rovman Powell and Keemo Paul, and Shannon Gabriel's suspension. Kemar Roach was ruled out of the West Indies' ODI squad due to injury, and was replaced by Andre Russell for the fourth and fifth ODIs.

Sam Curran was added to England's T20I squad, after Moeen Ali announced he would fly home after the last ODI match to rest ahead of the 2019 Indian Premier League. Obed McCoy was added to the West Indies' T20I squad, after Andre Russell was forced to pull out of the side due to injury.

== Tour matches ==
=== Two-day match: West Indies President's XI vs England ===
15–16 January 2019
Scorecard ECB scorecard

England	v	West Indies President's XI
317/10d (87 overs); Joe Root 87 (87); Bryan Charles 5/100 (25 overs)		203/19 (79.5 overs); Vishaul Singh 35 (125); James Anderson 4/12 (11 overs)

Match drawn
Three Ws Oval, Cave Hill
Umpires: Jonathan Blades (WI) and Leslie Reifer (WI)

- West Indies President's XI won the toss and elected to field.
- Each side batted for a whole day, irrespective of wickets lost. England lost 10 on the first day and West Indies President's XI 19 on the second.

=== Two-day match: West Indies President's XI vs England ===
17–18 January 2019
Scorecard

England	v	West Indies President's XI
379 (86.4 overs); Jonny Bairstow 98 (112); Raymon Reifer 3/39 (11 overs)		233/11 (73 overs); Sunil Ambris 94 (131); Chris Woakes 3/31 (10 overs)

Match drawn
Three Ws Oval, Cave Hill
Umpires: Jonathan Blades (WI) and Ryan Willoughby (WI)

- England won the toss and elected to bat.
- Each side batted for a whole day, irrespective of wickets lost. England lost 10 on the first day and West Indies President's XI 11 on the second.

=== 50-over match: UWI Vice Chancellor's XI vs England ===
17 February 2019
11:00
Scorecard

England; 371/7 (50 overs)	v	UWI Vice Chancellor's XI; 200 (43.5 overs)
Joe Root 114 (81); Yannick Ottley 2/64 (7 overs)		Nicholas Kirton 37 (53); Adil Rashid 2/21 (7 overs)

England won by 171 runs
Three Ws Oval, Cave Hill
Umpires: Gregory Brathwaite (WI) and Leslie Reifer (WI)

- UWI Vice Chancellor's XI won the toss and elected to field.

== Test series ==
=== 1st Test ===
23–27 January 2019 (Note: While five days of play were scheduled for each Test, the first and third Tests reached a result in four days and the second Test reached a result in three days.)
Scorecard

West Indies	v	England
289 (101.3 overs); Shimron Hetmyer 81 (109); James Anderson 5/46 (30 overs)		77 (30.2 overs); Keaton Jennings 17 (34); Kemar Roach 5/17 (11 overs)
415/6d (103.1 overs); Jason Holder 202* (229); Moeen Ali 3/78 (20 overs)		246 (80.4 overs); Rory Burns 84 (133); Roston Chase 8/60 (21.4 overs)

West Indies won by 381 runs
Kensington Oval, Bridgetown
Umpires: Chris Gaffaney (NZ) and Rod Tucker (Aus)
Player of the match: Jason Holder (WI)

- West Indies won the toss and elected to bat.
- John Campbell (WI) made his Test debut.
- Ben Stokes (Eng) played in his 50th Test.
- James Anderson became the first bowler for England to take 200 wickets away from home in Tests.
- James Anderson took his 27th five-wicket haul in Tests, the joint-most (with Ian Botham) by an English bowler.
- Jason Holder (WI) scored his first double century in Tests. It was the second fastest by a West Indies player and fastest in the Caribbean, in terms of balls faced (229). His 202 not out was the third-highest individual score by a number eight batsman in Tests.
- Roston Chase's bowling figures of 8/60 were the best by a West Indies spin bowler since 1971.
- This was the West Indies' greatest victory at home in terms of runs (381).

=== 2nd Test ===
31 January–4 February 2019
Scorecard

England	v	West Indies
187 (61 overs); Moeen Ali 60 (104); Kemar Roach 4/30 (15 overs)		306 (131 overs); Darren Bravo 50 (216); Stuart Broad 3/53 (36 overs)
132 (42.1 overs); Jos Buttler 24 (48); Jason Holder 4/43 (12.1 overs)		17/0 (2.1 overs); John Campbell 11* (6)

West Indies won by 10 wickets
Sir Vivian Richards Stadium, North Sound
Umpires: Kumar Dharmasena (SL) and Chris Gaffaney (NZ)
Player of the match: Kemar Roach (WI)

- West Indies won the toss and elected to field.
- Joe Denly (Eng) made his Test debut.

=== 3rd Test ===
9–13 February 2019
Scorecard

England	v	West Indies
277 (101.5 overs); Ben Stokes 79 (175); Kemar Roach 4/48 (25.5 overs)		154 (47.2 overs); John Campbell 41 (63); Mark Wood 5/41 (8.2 overs)
361/5d (105.2 overs); Joe Root 122 (225); Shannon Gabriel 2/95 (23.2 overs)		252 (69.5 overs); Roston Chase 102* (191); James Anderson 3/27 (11 overs)

England won by 232 runs
Daren Sammy Cricket Ground, Gros Islet
Umpires: Kumar Dharmasena (SL) and Rod Tucker (Aus)
Player of the match: Mark Wood (Eng)

- West Indies won the toss and elected to field.
- Mark Wood (Eng) took his first five-wicket haul in Tests.
- Joe Root scored his 2,000th run as captain of England in Tests.

== ODI series ==
=== 1st ODI ===
20 February 2019
11:00
Scorecard

West Indies; 360/8 (50 overs)	v	England; 364/4 (48.4 overs)
Chris Gayle 135 (129); Ben Stokes 3/37 (8 overs)		Jason Roy 123 (85); Jason Holder 2/63 (9.4 overs)

England won by 6 wickets
Kensington Oval, Bridgetown
Umpires: Leslie Reifer (WI) and Paul Wilson (Aus)
Player of the match: Jason Roy (Eng)

- West Indies won the toss and elected to bat.
- John Campbell and Nicholas Pooran (WI) both made their ODI debuts.
- The West Indies made their highest total against England, and their highest total at home in ODIs.
- The West Indies hit 23 sixes in their innings, a record in ODIs, before it was surpassed in the fourth ODI by England who hit 24.
- Joe Root (Eng) scored his 5,000th run in ODIs.
- This was England's highest successful run chase and third-highest by any side in ODIs.

=== 2nd ODI ===
22 February 2019
11:00
Scorecard

West Indies; 289/6 (50 overs)	v	England; 263 (47.4 overs)
Shimron Hetmyer 104* (83); Adil Rashid 1/28 (6 overs)		Ben Stokes 79 (85); Sheldon Cottrell 5/46 (9 overs)

West Indies won by 26 runs
Kensington Oval, Bridgetown
Umpires: Gregory Brathwaite (WI) and Bruce Oxenford (Aus)
Player of the match: Shimron Hetmyer (WI)

- England won the toss and elected to field.
- Sheldon Cottrell (WI) took his first five-wicket haul in ODIs.

=== 3rd ODI ===
25 February 2019
09:30
Scorecard

West Indies	v	England

No result
National Cricket Stadium, Grenada
Umpires: Nigel Duguid (WI) and Paul Wilson (Aus)

- England won the toss and elected to field.
- No play was possible due to rain.
- Darren Bravo (WI) played in his 100th ODI.

=== 4th ODI ===
27 February 2019
09:30
Scorecard

England; 418/6 (50 overs)	v	West Indies; 389 (48 overs)
Jos Buttler 150 (77); Carlos Brathwaite 2/69 (10 overs)		Chris Gayle 162 (97); Adil Rashid 5/85 (10 overs)

England won by 29 runs
National Cricket Stadium, Grenada
Umpires: Gregory Brathwaite (WI) and Bruce Oxenford (Aus)
Player of the match: Jos Buttler (Eng)

- West Indies won the toss and elected to field.
- This was the 100th ODI played between the West Indies and England.
- Eoin Morgan became the first batsman to score 6,000 runs for England in ODIs.
- Jos Buttler (Eng) scored the fastest century in the West Indies in ODIs (60 balls), and scored the most sixes in an ODI innings for England (12). Chris Gayle (WI) then surpassed Buttler's record by taking 55 balls to complete his century.
- England hit 24 sixes in their innings, breaking the previous record of 23, set by the West Indies in the first ODI.
- This was England's highest total against the West Indies in ODIs.
- Chris Gayle (WI) scored his 10,000th run and his 25th century in ODIs. Gayle also scored his 500th six in international cricket.
- 46 sixes were hit in the match, a record in ODIs.
- This was the West Indies' highest total in ODIs.

=== 5th ODI ===
2 March 2019
11:00
Scorecard

England; 113 (28.1 overs)	v	West Indies; 115/3 (12.1 overs)
Alex Hales 23 (35); Oshane Thomas 5/21 (5.1 overs)		Chris Gayle 77 (27); Mark Wood 2/55 (6 overs)

West Indies won by 7 wickets
Daren Sammy Cricket Ground, Gros Islet
Umpires: Nigel Duguid (WI) and Paul Wilson (Aus)
Player of the match: Oshane Thomas (WI)

- West Indies won the toss and elected to field.
- Oshane Thomas (WI) took his first five-wicket haul in ODIs.
- This was England's lowest total against the West Indies in ODIs.
- Chris Gayle scored the fastest half-century by a West Indies batsman in ODIs (19 balls).
- This was England's biggest defeat, in terms of balls remaining, in ODIs (227).

== T20I series ==
=== 1st T20I ===
5 March 2019
16:00 (D/N)
Scorecard

West Indies; 160/8 (20 overs)	v	England; 161/6 (18.5 overs)
Nicholas Pooran 58 (37); Tom Curran 4/36 (4 overs)		Jonny Bairstow 68 (40); Sheldon Cottrell 3/29 (3.5 overs)

England won by 4 wickets
Daren Sammy Cricket Ground, Gros Islet
Umpires: Gregory Brathwaite (WI) and Nigel Duguid (WI)
Player of the match: Jonny Bairstow (Eng)

- England won the toss and elected to field.
- Jason Holder captained the West Indies for the first time in T20Is.

=== 2nd T20I ===
8 March 2019
16:00 (D/N)
Scorecard

England; 182/6 (20 overs)	v	West Indies; 45 (11.5 overs)
Sam Billings 87 (47); Fabian Allen 2/29 (4 overs)		Carlos Brathwaite 10 (4); Chris Jordan 4/6 (2 overs)

England won by 137 runs
Warner Park, Basseterre
Umpires: Gregory Brathwaite (WI) and Leslie Reifer (WI)
Player of the match: Sam Billings (Eng)

- West Indies won the toss and elected to field.
- Obed McCoy (WI) made his T20I debut.
- The West Indies' score of 45 was the second-lowest in T20Is and the lowest by a Full Member nation.
- Chris Jordan's figures of 4/6 were the best by an England bowler in T20Is.
- This was England's largest win, in terms of runs, and the fourth-largest victory by any team in T20Is.

=== 3rd T20I ===
10 March 2019
16:00 (D/N)
Scorecard

West Indies; 71 (13 overs)	v	England; 72/2 (10.3 overs)
Jason Holder 11 (13); David Willey 4/7 (3 overs)		Jonny Bairstow 37 (31); Devendra Bishoo 1/11 (1.3 overs)

England won by 8 wickets
Warner Park, Basseterre
Umpires: Nigel Duguid (WI) and Leslie Reifer (WI)
Player of the match: David Willey (Eng)

- West Indies won the toss and elected to bat.
- John Campbell (WI) made his T20I debut.
- This was England's largest win, in terms of balls remaining, in T20Is (57).
