= List of international cricket centuries by Alastair Cook =

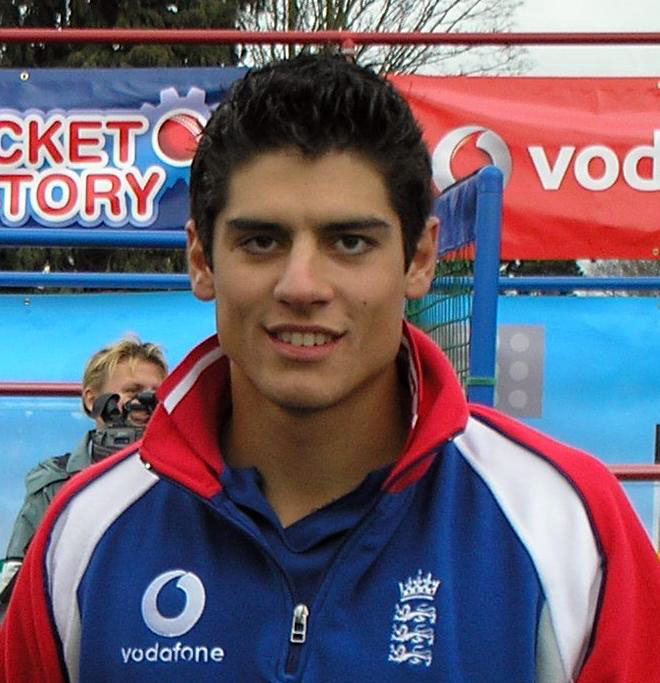
Alastair Cook has scored 38 centuries for England.

Sir Alastair Cook is a retired English cricketer and former captain of the England cricket team. He scored centuries (100 or more runs in a single innings) in Test and One Day International (ODI) matches on 33 and 5 occasions respectively. In a career that spanned from 2006 to 2018, he played 161 Tests and 92 ODIs for England, scoring 12,472 and 3,204 runs respectively. He is the joint youngest batsman to score 10,000 or more runs in Test cricket, and has scored the most Test runs as an opening batsman. Cook was appointed a Commander of the Order of the British Empire (CBE) in the 2016 Birthday Honours. In 2011, the International Cricket Council (ICC) selected him as their Test Player of the Year. Wisden named him as one of their cricketers of the year in 2012.

Cook made his Test debut against India at the Vidarbha Cricket Association Ground, Nagpur in 2006. He became the sixteenth English cricketer to score a century on Test debut when he scored 104 in the second innings. His score of 294, against the same team at the Edgbaston Cricket Ground, Birmingham, in 2011, is the seventh highest total by an English batsman in Test cricket. Cook has scored Test centuries at 24 cricket grounds, including 17 outside England. He has scored centuries against all eight Test opponents the team has played and scored the most centuries (seven) against India. In May 2015, Cook became England's all-time leading run scorer in Tests, when he went past Graham Gooch's tally of 8900 runs. As of September 2018, he ranks equal tenth among players with most Test centuries, and top of the equivalent list for England. His 38 centuries across all formats is the highest by an English cricketer.

Cook made his ODI debut in 2006 against Sri Lanka at Old Trafford, Manchester. His first century came against India at the Rose Bowl, Southampton, in August 2007. His highest score of 137 runs was made against Pakistan at the Zayed Sports City Stadium, Abu Dhabi, in 2011. Cook played four Twenty20 International (T20I) matches between 2007 and 2009, without scoring a century.

== Key ==
- * – Remained not out
- † – Man of the match
- ‡ – Captain of England in that match

== Test cricket centuries ==
List of Test centuries scored by Alastair Cook
No.	Score	Against	Pos.	Inn.	Test	Venue	H/A/N	Date	Result	Ref
1	104*	India	2	3	1/3	Vidarbha Cricket Association Ground, Nagpur	Away	1 March 2006	Drawn	
2	105	Pakistan	3	1	1/4	Lord's, London	Home	13 July 2006	Drawn	
3	127	Pakistan	3	2	2/4	Old Trafford, Manchester	Home	27 July 2006	Won	
4	116	Australia	2	4	3/5	WACA Ground, Perth	Away	14 December 2006	Lost	
5	105 †	West Indies	2	1	1/4	Lord's, London	Home	17 May 2007	Drawn	
6	106	West Indies	2	3	3/4	Old Trafford, Manchester	Home	7 June 2007	Won	
7	118	Sri Lanka	1	3	3/3	Galle International Stadium, Galle	Away	18 December 2007	Drawn	
8	139*	West Indies	2	3	4/5	Kensington Oval, Bridgetown	Away	26 February 2009	Drawn	
9	160	West Indies	2	1	1/1	Riverside Ground, Chester-le-Street	Home	14 May 2009	Won	
10	118	South Africa	2	2	1/4	Kingsmead Cricket Ground, Durban	Away	26 December 2009	Won	
11	173 ‡	Bangladesh	1	1	1/2	Zohur Ahmed Chowdhury Stadium, Chittagong	Away	12 March 2010	Won	
12	109* ‡	Bangladesh	1	4	2/2	Sher-e-Bangla National Cricket Stadium, Dhaka	Away	20 March 2010	Won	
13	110	Pakistan	2	3	3/4	The Oval, London	Home	18 August 2010	Lost	
14	235* †	Australia	2	3	1/5	The Gabba, Brisbane	Away	25 November 2010	Drawn	
15	148	Australia	2	2	2/5	Adelaide Oval, Adelaide	Away	3 December 2010	Won	
16	189 †	Australia	2	2	5/5	Sydney Cricket Ground, Sydney	Away	3 January 2011	Won	
17	133	Sri Lanka	2	2	1/3	Sophia Gardens, Cardiff	Home	26 May 2011	Won	
18	106	Sri Lanka	2	3	2/3	Lord's, London	Home	3 June 2011	Won	
19	294 †	India	2	2	3/4	Edgbaston, Birmingham	Home	10 August 2011	Won	
20	115	South Africa	2	1	1/3	The Oval, London	Home	19 July 2012	Lost	
21	176 ‡	India	1	3	1/4	Sardar Patel Stadium, Ahmedabad	Away	15 November 2012	Lost	
22	122 ‡	India	1	2	2/4	Wankhede Stadium, Mumbai	Away	23 November 2012	Won	
23	190 ‡ †	India	1	2	3/4	Eden Gardens, Kolkata	Away	5 December 2012	Won	
24	116 ‡	New Zealand	1	2	1/3	University Oval, Dunedin	Away	6 March 2013	Drawn	
25	130 ‡	New Zealand	1	3	2/2	Headingley, Leeds	Home	24 May 2013	Won	
26	105 ‡	West Indies	1	1	3/3	Kensington Oval, Bridgetown	Away	1 May 2015	Lost	
27	162 ‡	New Zealand	2	3	1/2	Lord's, London	Home	21 May 2015	Won	
28	263 ‡ †	Pakistan	1	2	1/3	Zayed Sports City Stadium, Abu Dhabi	Neutral	15 October 2015	Drawn	
29	105 ‡	Pakistan	1	1	2/4	Old Trafford, Manchester	Home	22 July 2016	Won	
30	130 ‡	India	1	3	1/5	Saurashtra Cricket Association Stadium, Rajkot	Away	13 November 2016	Drawn	
31	243 †	West Indies	1	1	1/3	Edgbaston, Birmingham	Home	17 August 2017	Won	
32	244* †	Australia	1	2	4/5	Melbourne Cricket Ground, Melbourne	Away	26 December 2017	Drawn	
33	147	India	1	3	5/5	The Oval, London	Home	7 September 2018	Won	

== One Day International centuries ==
List of ODI centuries scored by Alastair Cook
No.	Score	Against	Pos.	Inn.	S/R	Venue	H/A/N	Date	Result	Ref
1	102	India	1	1	80.95	Rose Bowl, Southampton	Home	21 August 2007	Won	
2	119 ‡	Sri Lanka	1	1	83.21	Lord's, London	Home	3 July 2011	Lost	
3	137 ‡ †	Pakistan	1	1	96.47	Sheikh Zayed Stadium, Abu Dhabi	Neutral	13 February 2012	Won	
4	102 ‡ †	Pakistan	1	1	84.29	Sheikh Zayed Stadium, Abu Dhabi	Neutral	15 February 2012	Won	
5	112 ‡ †	West Indies	1	2	93.33	The Oval, London	Home	19 June 2012	Won	
