= List of international cricket centuries by Sanath Jayasuriya =

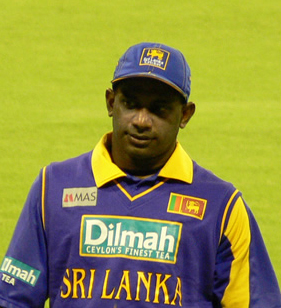
Sanath Jayasuriya has the most centuries (28) for Sri Lanka in ODIs.

Sanath Jayasuriya is a Sri Lankan cricketer and former captain of the Sri Lanka national cricket team. He is an all-rounder and opening batsman, and is known for his aggressive batting style that has earned him the name "Master Blaster". His batting style introduced a new strategy to the game during the 1996 World Cup, where he and fellow opener Romesh Kaluwitharana batted highly aggressively in the early overs using fielding restrictions (Note: Only two fielders were allowed in the outfield outside the 30 yard circle for a duration of 15 overs from the start of the match. The remaining nine (including the bowler and wicket-keeper) had to be placed inside the circle. This rule has since changed with the introduction of powerplays.) to their advantage. This later became a standard opening batting strategy and, according to Australian cricketer Glenn McGrath, Jayasuriya "changed everyone's thinking about how to start innings". As a result of his performances, Jayasuriya was selected as a Wisden Cricketer of the Year in 1997, despite not having played in the previous English cricketing season. (Note: A player is selected as a Wisden Cricketer for his "influence on the previous English season". Therefore the selected players are usually those who have excelled in their performances during the season. Jayasuriya, who had not played in it, was selected because his batting had "changed the shape of the one-day game for good", and thereby influenced the English season as well.) He scored 42 centuries in Test and One Day International (ODI) games, but was not able to score a century in a Twenty20 International match, where his highest score is 88.

Although Jayasuriya made his Test debut in 1991, it was not until 1996 that he scored his first century, when he had become a regular player in the Sri Lankan side. His career high of 340 against India in August 1997 was the highest score by a Sri Lankan cricketer until 2006 and is also part of the highest team total (952/6) made in Test cricket. He has also scored two double centuries; 213 against England and 253 against Pakistan. His 157 against Zimbabwe in 2004 is the second fastest century by a Sri Lankan player. Jayasuriya, having scored centuries against every Test playing nation except New Zealand and the West Indies, retired from Test cricket in 2007 with 14 to his name.

Jayasuriya made his ODI debut in 1989 and started playing as an opening batsman in 1993. He went on to score his first century in 1994 against New Zealand. From then on, Jayasuriya has scored the highest number of ODI centuries for Sri Lanka with 28 to his name. As of September 2019, he holds fourth place for the most ODI centuries in a career, behind Virat Kohli (50 centuries), Sachin Tendulkar (49 centuries) and Ricky Ponting (30 centuries). His second century, 134 against Pakistan in 1996, was scored at a strike rate of 206.15 and was the fastest century in ODI cricket at the time. This record was later broken by Pakistani cricketer Shahid Afridi. The 189 he made against India in 2000 is the sixth highest ODI score in a single innings. Making his second highest ODI score of 157 against the Netherlands in 2006, Jayasuriya paved the way for Sri Lanka to set the world record for the highest ODI team total of 443/9. With his 107 against India on 28 January 2009, Jayasuriya—39 years and 212 days old at the time—became the oldest player to score a century, and also became the second player to score more than 13,000 runs in a career. (Note: Sachin Tendulkar was the first player to go past 13,000 ODI runs.)

== Key ==
- * – Remained not out
- ‡ – Captain in that match
- † – Man of the match
- (D/L) – Result was determined by the Duckworth–Lewis method

== Test centuries ==
Test centuries scored by Sanath Jayasuriya
| No. | Score | Against | Pos. | Inn. | Test | Venue | H/A | Date | Result | Ref |
|---|---|---|---|---|---|---|---|---|---|---|
| 1 | 112 | Australia | 1 | 4 | 3/3 | Adelaide Oval, Adelaide | Away | 25 January 1996 | Lost | |
| 2 | 113 | Pakistan | 1 | 3 | 2/2 | Sinhalese Sports Club Ground, Colombo | Home | 26 April 1997 | Drawn | |
| 3 | 340 † | India | 1 | 2 | 1/2 | R. Premadasa Stadium, Colombo | Home | 2 August 1997 | Drawn | |
| 4 | 199 | India | 1 | 3 | 2/2 | Sinhalese Sports Club Ground, Colombo | Home | 9 August 1997 | Drawn | |
| 5 | 213 | England | 1 | 2 | 1/1 | The Oval, London | Away | 27 August 1998 | Won | |
| 6 | 188 ‡ | Pakistan | 2 | 1 | 3/3 | Asgiriya Stadium, Kandy | Home | 28 June 2000 | Drawn | |
| 7 | 148 † | South Africa | 2 | 1 | 1/3 | Galle International Stadium, Galle | Home | 20 July 2000 | Won | |
| 8 | 111 † ‡ | India | 2 | 2 | 1/3 | Galle International Stadium, Galle | Home | 14 August 2001 | Won | |
| 9 | 139 ‡ | Zimbabwe | 2 | 2 | 2/3 | Asgiriya Stadium, Kandy | Home | 4 January 2002 | Won | |
| 10 | 145 ‡ | Bangladesh | 6 | 2 | 1/2 | Paikiasothy Saravanamuttu Stadium, Colombo | Home | 21 July 2002 | Won | |
| 11 | 131 | Australia | 2 | 4 | 2/3 | Asgiriya Stadium, Kandy | Home | 16 March 2004 | Lost | |
| 12 | 157 | Zimbabwe | 2 | 2 | 1/2 | Harare Sports Club Ground, Harare | Away | 6 May 2004 | Won | |
| 13 | 253 † | Pakistan | 2 | 3 | 1/2 | Iqbal Stadium, Faisalabad | Away | 20 October 2004 | Won | |
| 14 | 107 | Pakistan | 1 | 3 | 2/2 | National Stadium, Karachi | Away | 28 October 2004 | Lost | |

== ODI centuries ==
ODI centuries scored by Sanath Jayasuirya
| No. | Score | Balls | Against | Pos. | Inn. | S/R | Venue | H/A/N | Date | Result | Ref |
|---|---|---|---|---|---|---|---|---|---|---|---|
| 1 | 140 | 143 | New Zealand | 2 | 1 | 97.90 | Goodyear Park, Bloemfontein | Neutral | 8 December 1994 | No result | |
| 2 | 134 † | 114 | Pakistan | 1 | 1 | 117.54 | Singapore Cricket Club, Padang | Neutral | 2 April 1996 | Won | |
| 3 | 120* † | 128 | India | 1 | 2 | 93.75 | R. Premadasa Stadium, Colombo | Home | 28 August 1996 | Won | |
| 4 | 151* † | 120 | India | 1 | 2 | 125.83 | Wankhede Stadium, Mumbai | Away | 17 May 1997 | Won | |
| 5 | 108 † | 83 | Bangladesh | 1 | 1 | 130.12 | Sinhalese Sports Club Ground, Colombo | Home | 22 July 1997 | Won | |
| 6 | 134* † | 114 | Pakistan | 1 | 2 | 117.54 | Gaddafi Stadium, Lahore | Away | 5 November 1997 | Won | |
| 7 | 102 † ‡ | 100 | Zimbabwe | 1 | 2 | 102.00 | Sinhalese Sports Club Ground, Colombo | Home | 26 January 1998 | Won | |
| 8 | 105 † ‡ | 116 | India | 1 | 1 | 90.51 | Bangabandhu National Stadium, Dhaka | Neutral | 1 June 2000 | Won | |
| 9 | 189 † ‡ | 161 | India | 1 | 1 | 117.39 | Sharjah Cricket Association Stadium, Sharjah | Neutral | 29 October 2000 | Won | |
| 10 | 103 † ‡ | 83 | New Zealand | 1 | 2 | 124.09 | Eden Park, Auckland | Away | 6 February 2001 | Won | |
| 11 | 107 ‡ | 116 | New Zealand | 2 | 1 | 92.24 | Sharjah Cricket Association Stadium, Sharjah | Neutral | 10 April 2001 | Won | |
| 12 | 112 † ‡ | 87 | England | 1 | 1 | 128.73 | Headingley, Leeds | Away | 2 July 2002 | Lost | |
| 13 | 102* † ‡ | 120 | Pakistan | 1 | 2 | 85.00 | R. Premadasa Stadium, Colombo | Home | 12 September 2002 | Won | |
| 14 | 122 † ‡ | 105 | Australia | 2 | 1 | 116.19 | Sydney Cricket Ground, Sydney | Away | 9 January 2003 | Won | |
| 15 | 106 † ‡ | 110 | England | 2 | 1 | 96.36 | Sydney Cricket Ground, Sydney | Neutral | 13 January 2003 | Won | |
| 16 | 120 † ‡ | 125 | New Zealand | 2 | 1 | 96.00 | Goodyear Park, Bloemfontein | Neutral | 10 February 2003 | Won | |
| 17 | 107* † | 101 | Bangladesh | 2 | 2 | 105.94 | R. Premadasa Stadium, Colombo | Home | 23 July 2004 | Won | |
| 18 | 130 | 132 | India | 2 | 2 | 98.48 | R. Premadasa Stadium, Colombo | Home | 27 July 2004 | Lost | |
| 19 | 114 † | 96 | Australia | 2 | 1 | 118.75 | Sydney Cricket Ground, Sydney | Away | 22 January 2006 | Won | |
| 20 | 122 † | 136 | England | 2 | 1 | 89.70 | The Oval, London | Away | 20 June 2006 | Won | |
| 21 | 152 † | 99 | England | 2 | 2 | 153.53 | Headingley, Leeds | Away | 1 July 2006 | Won | |
| 22 | 157 † | 104 | Netherlands | 2 | 1 | 150.96 | VRA Cricket Ground, Amstelveen | Away | 4 July 2006 | Won | |
| 23 | 111 † | 82 | New Zealand | 2 | 2 | 135.36 | McLean Park, Napier | Away | 28 December 2006 | Won | |
| 24 | 109 † | 87 | Bangladesh | 2 | 1 | 125.28 | Queen's Park Oval, Port of Spain | Neutral | 21 March 2007 | Won (D/L) | |
| 25 | 115 † | 101 | West Indies | 2 | 1 | 113.86 | Providence Stadium, Guyana | Away | 1 April 2007 | Won | |
| 26 | 130 † | 88 | Bangladesh | 1 | 1 | 147.72 | National Stadium, Karachi | Neutral | 30 June 2008 | Won | |
| 27 | 125 | 114 | India | 1 | 1 | 109.64 | National Stadium, Karachi | Neutral | 6 July 2008 | Won | |
| 28 | 107 † | 114 | India | 2 | 1 | 93.85 | Rangiri Dambulla International Stadium, Dambulla | Home | 28 January 2009 | Lost | |
