= List of bowlers who have taken 300 or more wickets in Test cricket =

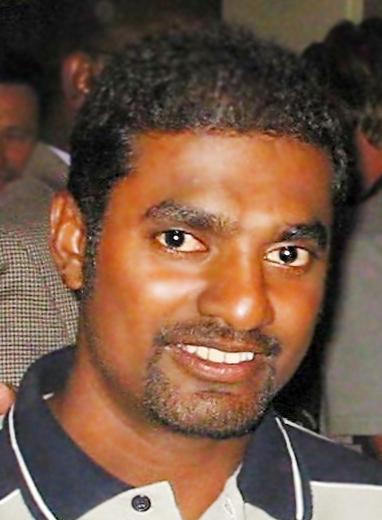
Muttiah Muralitharan has taken the highest number of wickets in Test cricket.

Taking 300 or more wickets across a playing career is considered a significant achievement in Test cricket. First accomplished in 1964 by Englishman Fred Trueman, as of August 2026 the feat has been achieved by only 42 cricketers in the history of the game. Nine players from Australia, seven from India, six from South Africa, five from England and the West Indies, four from New Zealand, and three from Pakistan and Sri Lanka have crossed the 300-wicket mark in Tests. Afghanistan, Bangladesh, Ireland and Zimbabwe are yet to see a player reach the 300 mark.

As of March 2024, former Sri Lankan cricketer Muttiah Muralitharan has the highest aggregate with 800 wickets. He also holds the record for the most five-wicket hauls (67) and ten-wicket hauls in a match (22); his 16 wickets for 220 runs against England in 1998 is the fifth-best bowling performance by a player in a match. Indian spinner Ravichandran Ashwin crossed the 300-wicket mark in the fewest number of matches (54), whilst South African Kagiso Rabada did so in the fewest deliveries (11,817). The late West Indian player Malcolm Marshall has the best bowling average (20.94) among those who have achieved the milestone. Fellow West Indian Lance Gibbs is the most economical player with 1.98 runs per over, while South African fast bowler Kagiso Rabada has the best strike rate of 38.5 balls per wicket. India's Anil Kumble has the second-best bowling figures in an innings (10 wickets for 74 runs against Pakistan in 1999); they are the second-best in the history of Test cricket after English off-spin bowler Jim Laker's 10 for 53 (against Australia in 1956).

In 1990, Richard Hadlee became the first bowler to take 400 Test wickets, whilst in 2001, Courtney Walsh was the first to reach 500 wicket mark. Shane Warne was the first to take both 600 and 700 Test wickets, in 2005 and 2006 respectively. Warne's haul of 96 wickets in 2005 is the highest total in a calendar year, ahead of the 90 wickets taken the following year by Muralitharan, although he played fewer innings.

== Key ==
- Mat. – Number of matches played
- Inn. – Number of innings bowled
- Balls – Balls bowled in career
- Runs – Runs conceded in career
- Wkts – Wickets taken in career
- Ave. – Average runs per wicket
- Econ. – Runs conceded per over
- SR. – Number of balls bowled per wicket taken
- BBI – Best bowling in an innings
- BBM – Best bowling in a match
- 5WI – Five or more wickets in an innings
- 10WM – Ten or more wickets in a match
- Period – Cricketing career of the player

== Bowlers with 300 or more Test wickets ==
- Statistics are correct to 23 August 2026.
- The list is initially sorted by the most wickets taken by a bowler. To sort this table by any statistic, click on the arrows next to the column title.

	Denotes players who have been Inducted into the ICC Cricket Hall of Fame
†	Denotes players who are still active

Bowlers who have taken 300 or more wickets in Test cricket
No.	Bowler	Type	Team	Mat.	Inn.	Balls	Runs	Wkts	Ave.	Econ.	SR	BBI	BBM	5WI	10WM	Period	Ref(s)
1	Muttiah Muralitharan	Right-arm off break	Sri Lanka	133	230	44,039	18,180	800	22.72	2.47	55.04	9/51	16/220	67	22	1992–2010	
2	Shane Warne	Right-arm leg break	Australia	145	273	40,705	17,995	708	25.41	2.65	57.49	8/71	12/128	37	10	1992–2007	
3	James Anderson	Right-arm fast-medium	England	188	350	40,037	18,627	704	26.45	2.79	56.87	7/42	11/71	32	3	2003–2024	
4	Anil Kumble	Right-arm leg break	India	132	236	40,850	18,355	619	29.65	2.69	65.99	10/74	14/149	35	8	1990–2008	
5	Stuart Broad	Right-arm fast-medium	England	167	309	33,698	16,719	604	27.68	2.97	55.79	8/15	11/121	20	3	2007–2023	
6	Nathan Lyon †	Right-arm off break	Australia	144	267	35,369	17,339	573	30.26	2.94	61.72	8/50	13/154	24	5	2011–	
7	Glenn McGrath	Right arm fast-medium	Australia	124	243	29,248	12,186	563	21.64	2.49	51.95	8/24	10/27	29	3	1993–2007	
8	Ravichandran Ashwin	Right-arm off break	India	106	200	27,246	12,891	537	24.00	2.83	50.73	7/59	13/140	37	8	2011–2024	
9	Courtney Walsh	Right-arm fast	West Indies	132	242	30,019	12,688	519	24.44	2.53	57.84	7/37	13/55	22	3	1984–2001	
10	Mitchell Starc †	Left-arm fast	Australia	108	208	20,511	11,722	448	26.16	3.42	45.78	7/58	11/94	19	4	2011–	
11	Dale Steyn	Right-arm fast	South Africa	93	171	18,608	10,077	439	22.95	3.24	42.38	7/51	11/60	26	5	2004–2019	
12	Kapil Dev	Right arm fast-medium	India	131	227	27,740	12,867	434	29.64	2.78	63.91	9/83	11/146	23	2	1978–1994	
13	Rangana Herath	Left-arm off break	Sri Lanka	93	170	25,993	12,157	433	28.07	2.80	60.03	9/127	14/184	34	9	1999–2018	
14	Richard Hadlee	Right-arm fast	New Zealand	86	150	21,918	9,611	431	22.29	2.63	50.85	9/52	15/123	36	9	1973–1990	
15	Shaun Pollock	Right arm fast-medium	South Africa	108	202	24,353	9,733	421	23.11	2.39	57.84	7/87	10/147	16	1	1995–2008	
16	Harbhajan Singh	Right-arm off break	India	103	190	28,580	13,537	417	32.46	2.84	68.53	8/84	15/217	25	5	1998–2015	
17	Wasim Akram	Left-arm fast	Pakistan	104	181	22,627	9,779	414	23.62	2.59	54.65	7/119	11/110	25	5	1985–2002	
18	Curtly Ambrose	Right-arm fast	West Indies	98	179	22,103	8,501	405	20.99	2.30	54.57	8/45	11/84	22	3	1988–2000	
19	Tim Southee	Right-arm fast-medium	New Zealand	107	203	23,490	11,832	391	30.26	3.02	60.07	7/64	10/108	15	1	2008–2024	
20	Makhaya Ntini	Right-arm fast	South Africa	101	190	20,834	11,242	390	28.82	3.23	53.42	7/37	13/132	18	4	1998–2009	
21	Ian Botham	Right-arm fast-medium	England	102	168	21,815	10,878	383	28.40	2.99	56.95	8/34	13/106	27	4	1977–1992	
22	Malcolm Marshall	Right-arm fast	West Indies	81	151	17,584	7,876	376	20.94	2.68	46.76	7/22	11/89	22	4	1978–1991	
23	Waqar Younis	Right-arm fast	Pakistan	87	154	16,224	8,788	373	23.56	3.25	43.49	7/76	13/135	22	5	1989–2003	
24	Imran Khan	Right-arm fast	Pakistan	88	142	19,458	8,258	362	22.81	2.54	53.75	8/58	14/116	23	6	1971–1992	
24	Daniel Vettori	Left-arm off break	New Zealand	113	187	28,814	12,441	362	34.36	2.59	79.59	7/87	12/149	20	3	1997–2015	
26	Ravindra Jadeja †	Left-arm off break	India	91	171	20,856	9,008	356	25.30	2.59	58.58	7/42	10/110	15	3	2012–	
27	Dennis Lillee	Right-arm fast	Australia	70	132	18,467	8,493	355	23.92	2.75	52.01	7/83	11/123	23	7	1971–1984	
27	Chaminda Vaas	Left-arm fast medium	Sri Lanka	111	194	23,438	10,501	355	29.58	2.68	66.02	7/71	14/191	12	2	1994–2009	
29	Kagiso Rabada †	Right-arm fast	South Africa	73	134	13,436	7,493	340	22.03	3.34	39.51	7/112	13/144	17	4	2015–	
30	Allan Donald	Right-arm fast	South Africa	72	129	15,519	7,344	330	22.25	2.83	47.02	8/71	12/139	20	3	1992–2002	
31	Pat Cummins †	Right-arm fast	Australia	75	138	14,847	7,144	326	21.91	2.88	45.54	6/23	10/62	14	2	2011–	
32	Bob Willis	Right-arm fast	England	90	165	17,357	8,190	325	25.20	2.83	53.40	8/43	9/92	16	0	1971–1984	
33	Trent Boult	Left-arm fast-medium	New Zealand	78	149	17,417	8,717	317	27.49	3.00	54.94	6/30	10/80	10	1	2011–2022	
34	Mitchell Johnson	Left-arm fast	Australia	73	140	16,001	8,891	313	28.40	3.33	51.12	8/61	12/127	12	3	2007–2015	
35	Josh Hazlewood †	Right-arm fast	Australia	79	149	15,914	7,375	311	23.71	2.78	51.17	6/49	9/79	15	0	2014–	
35	Ishant Sharma	Right-arm fast-medium	India	105	188	19,160	10,078	311	32.40	3.15	61.60	7/74	10/108	11	1	2007–2021	
35	Zaheer Khan	Left-arm fast-medium	India	92	165	18,785	10,247	311	32.94	3.27	60.40	7/87	10/149	11	1	2000–2014	
38	Brett Lee	Right-arm fast	Australia	76	150	16,531	9,554	310	30.81	3.46	53.32	5/30	9/171	10	0	1999–2008	
39	Morné Morkel	Right-arm fast	South Africa	86	160	16,498	8,550	309	27.66	3.10	53.39	6/23	9/110	8	0	2006–2018	
39	Lance Gibbs	Right arm off break	West Indies	79	148	27,115	8,989	309	29.09	1.98	87.75	8/38	11/157	18	2	1958–1976	
41	Fred Trueman	Right-arm fast	England	67	127	15,178	6,625	307	21.57	2.61	49.43	8/31	12/119	17	3	1952–1965	
42	Kemar Roach †	Right-arm fast	West Indies	91	165	15,773	8,192	304	26.94	3.11	51.88	6/48	10/146	12	1	2009–	
Last Updated: 14 October 2026

== By team ==
Team	Players
Australia	9
India	7
South Africa	6
England	5
West Indies	5
New Zealand	4
Sri Lanka	3
Pakistan	3
Total	42

== See also ==
- List of Test cricket records
- List of bowlers who have taken 300 or more wickets in One Day International cricket
