= John Campbell (cricketer) =

Jamaican cricketer

Personal information
- Full name: John Dillon Campbell
- Born: 21 September 1993 (age 33); St. Mary, Jamaica
- Batting: Left-handed
- Bowling: Right-arm off spin
- Role: Opening batter

International information
- National side: West Indies (2019–present)
- Test debut (cap 317): 23 January 2019 v England
- Last Test: 18 December 2025 v New Zealand
- ODI debut (cap 189): 20 February 2019 v England
- Last ODI: 18 November 2025 v New Zealand
- T20I debut (cap 80): 10 March 2019 v England
- Last T20I: 3 August 2019 v India

Domestic team information
- Years: Team
- 2012/13–present: Jamaica

Career statistics
| Competition | Test | ODI | FC | LA |
|---|---|---|---|---|
| Matches | 25 | 6 | 103 | 50 |
| Runs scored | 1,141 | 248 | 5,777 | 1,492 |
| Batting average | 25.93 | 49.60 | 31.05 | 32.43 |
| 100s/50s | 1/3 | 1/0 | 10/26 | 1/11 |
| Top score | 115 | 179 | 156 | 179 |
| Balls bowled | 61 | 6 | 3,603 | 711 |
| Wickets | 0 | 0 | 58 | 25 |
| Bowling average | – | – | 31.63 | 21.72 |
| 5 wickets in innings | – | – | 2 | 0 |
| 10 wickets in match | – | – | 0 | 0 |
| Best bowling | – | – | 7/73 | 4/43 |
| Catches/stumpings | 13/– | 0/– | 92/– | 22/– |
- Source: ESPNcricinfo, 15 October 2025

John Dillon Campbell (born 21 September 1993) is a Jamaican professional cricketer who made his debut for the Jamaica national team in January 2013. He is a left-handed batsman and right-arm off spin bowler.

== Early and domestic career ==
From Saint Mary Parish, Campbell played for the West Indies under-19s at the 2012 Under-19 World Cup in Australia. Against England in the fifth-place playoff, he scored 105 from 133 balls, his team's only century at the tournament. Campbell made his senior debut for Jamaica at the 2012–13 Caribbean Twenty20. His first-class and List A debuts came the following season, and he has been a regular in the team since then. Against the Leeward Islands in the 2013–14 Regional Four Day Competition, Campbell scored his maiden first-class century, 110 runs from 180 balls. His maiden first-class five-wicket haul came during the 2015–16 season of the same competition, when he took 7/73 against Trinidad and Tobago.

== International career ==
In January 2019, he was named in the West Indies' Test squad for their series against England. He made his Test debut for the West Indies against England on 23 January 2019. In February 2019, he was added to the West Indies' One Day International (ODI) squad, also for the series against England. He made his ODI debut for the West Indies against England on 20 February 2019. The following month, he was also named in the West Indies' Twenty20 International (T20I) squad for their series against England. He made his T20I debut for the West Indies against England on 10 March 2019.

In the opening match of the 2019 Ireland Tri-Nation Series, against Ireland, Campbell scored his first century in ODIs. Campbell and Shai Hope went on to make 365 runs for the opening wicket. It was the highest opening partnership in ODIs, and it was also the first time that both openers had scored 150 runs each in an ODI match.

In May 2019, Cricket West Indies (CWI) named him as one of ten reserve players in the West Indies' squad for the 2019 Cricket World Cup. In June 2020, Campbell was named in the West Indies' Test squad, for their series against England. The Test series was originally scheduled to start in May 2020, but was moved back to July 2020 due to the COVID-19 pandemic.

In October 2022, Campbell was banned from cricket for four years by the Jamaica Anti-Doping Commission, which accused Campbell of not providing a blood sample in April 2022 for testing, after a successful appeal against the ban it was reduced to 22 months meaning that he's now clear to get back to playing cricket locally and internationally for Jamaica and the West Indies.

On 30 September, 2026, during the 2nd ODI against India, Campbell hit a 65 ball century, hitting 9 fours and 5 sixes, making it the fifth fastest century for the West Indies in ODI's.
