= List of bowlers who have taken 300 or more wickets in One Day International cricket =

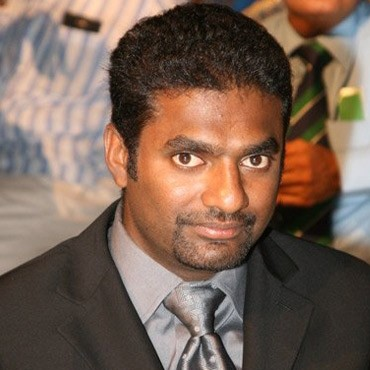
Muttiah Muralitharan, being the highest wicket taker in ODI cricket.

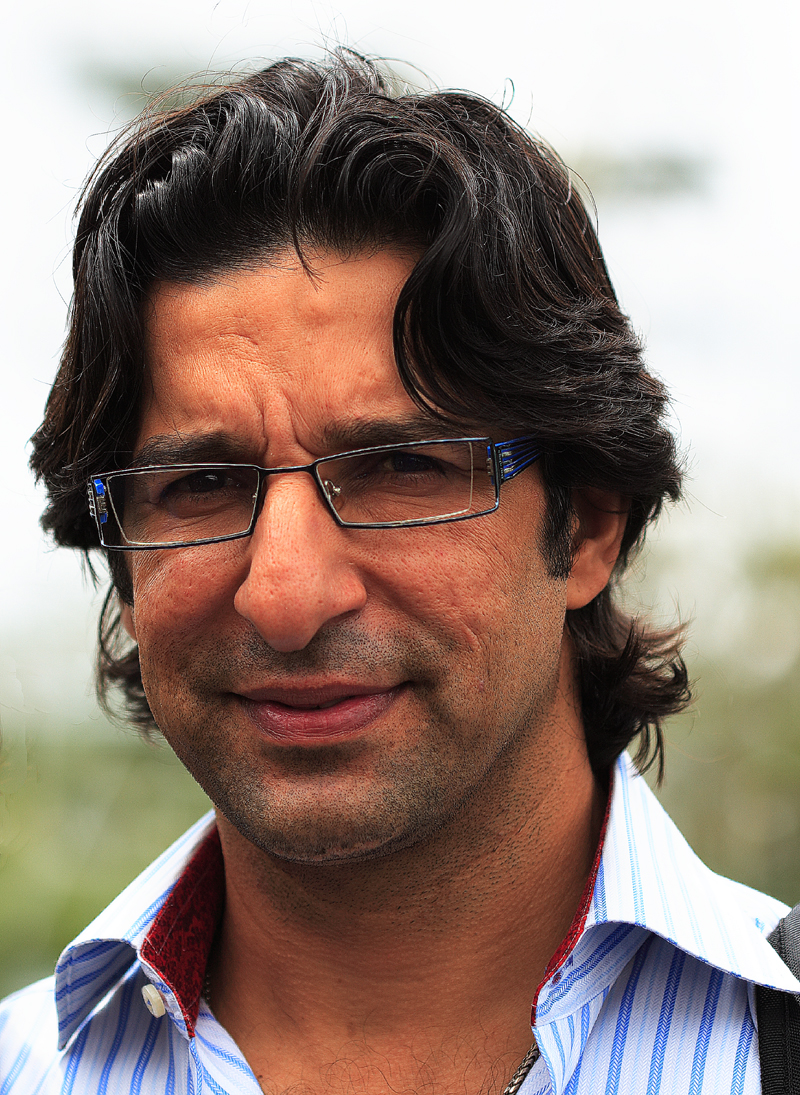
Wasim Akram, rated the best ODI bowler by Wisden in 2003, is one of the two bowlers who have taken over 500 wickets in ODIs.

Taking 300 or more wickets across a playing career is considered a significant achievement in One Day International (ODI) cricket. As of July 2023, the feat has been accomplished by only 14 cricketers in the history of the game, with Pakistani fast bowler Wasim Akram being the first to do so in October 1996. Akram was also the first player to take 400 and 500 wickets in this format. Four Sri Lankan players have taken 300 or more wickets, along with three Pakistanis, two Australians, two Indians, one New Zealander and one South African player and one Bangladeshi. England, the West Indies and Zimbabwe are yet to see a player reach the 300 mark.

Sri Lankan bowler Muttiah Muralitharan has the highest aggregate with 534 wickets; he also has 10 five-wicket hauls. Australian Glenn McGrath has the best bowling average (22.02) among players who have taken 300 or more wickets. In terms of matches played, Brett Lee—another Australian cricketer—took the fewest (171) to accomplish the feat. South African fast bowler Shaun Pollock is the most economical with 3.67 runs per over, whereas Lee has the best strike rate of 29.4 balls per wicket. Sri Lankan Chaminda Vaas' eight wickets for 19 runs against Zimbabwe in 2001 remains the only occasion where a bowler has taken eight wickets in an ODI. Waqar Younis's 13 five-wicket hauls remain the most by any bowler. Shakib Al Hasan is the only active player who is having 300 wickets in ODI.

Among the bowlers who have taken over 300 wickets in ODIs, Sanath Jayasuriya is the only cricketer who has also joined 10,000 runs club in ODI cricket.

== Key ==
- Mat. – Number of matches played
- Inn. – Number of innings bowled
- Balls – Balls bowled in career
- Runs – Runs conceded in career
- Wkts – Wickets taken in career
- Ave. – Average runs per wicket
- Econ. – Runs conceded per over
- SR. – Number of balls bowled per wicket taken
- BBM – Best bowling in a match
- 5w/i – Five or more wickets in an innings
- Period – Cricketing career of the player

== List of bowlers in 300-wicket club ==
- The list is initially arranged by the most number of wickets taken by a bowler. To sort this table by any statistic, click on the applicable header box beside (not on) the column title.

^	Inducted into the ICC Cricket Hall of Fame
†	Denotes player who is still active

Bowlers who have taken 300 or more wickets in ODI cricket
No.	Bowler	Team	Mat.	Inn.	Balls	Runs	Wkts	Ave.	Econ.	SR.	BBM	5w/i	Period	Ref(s)
1	Muttiah Muralitharan^	Sri Lanka	350	341	18,811	12,326	534	23.08	3.93	35.2	7/30	10	1993–2011	
2	Wasim Akram^	Pakistan	356	351	18,186	11,812	502	23.52	3.89	36.2	5/15	6	1984–2003	
3	Waqar Younis^	Pakistan	262	258	12,698	9,919	416	23.84	4.68	30.5	7/36	13	1989–2003	
4	Chaminda Vaas	Sri Lanka	322	320	15,775	11,014	400	27.53	4.18	39.4	8/19	4	1994–2008	
5	Shahid Afridi	Pakistan	398	372	17,670	13,632	395	34.51	4.62	44.7	7/12	9	1996–2015	
6	Shaun Pollock	South Africa	303	297	15,712	9,631	393	24.50	3.67	39.9	6/35	5	1996–2008	
7	Glenn McGrath^	Australia	250	248	12,970	8,391	381	22.02	3.88	34.0	7/15	7	1993–2007	
8	Brett Lee	Australia	221	217	11,185	8,877	380	23.36	4.76	29.4	5/22	9	2000–2012	
9	Lasith Malinga	Sri Lanka	226	220	10,936	9,760	338	28.87	5.35	32.3	6/38	8	2004–2019	
10	Anil Kumble^	India	271	265	14,496	10,412	337	30.89	4.30	43.0	6/12	2	1990–2007	
11	Sanath Jayasuriya	Sri Lanka	445	368	14,874	11,871	323	36.75	4.78	46.0	6/29	4	1989–2011	
12	Shakib Al Hasan	Bangladesh	247	241	12,575	9,360	317	29.52	4.46	39.6	5/29	4	2006–2023	
13	Javagal Srinath	India	229	227	11,935	8,847	315	28.08	4.44	37.8	5/23	3	1991–2003	
14	Daniel Vettori	New Zealand	295	277	14,060	9,674	305	31.71	4.12	46.0	5/7	2	1997–2015	

Last updated: 11 July 2023

== By country ==
300 or more wickets by country in ODIs
Teams	300 or more wickets
Sri Lanka	4
Pakistan	3
Australia	2
India	2
Bangladesh	1
New Zealand	1
South Africa	1

== See also ==
- List of One Day International cricket records
- List of bowlers who have taken 300 or more wickets in Test cricket
