= List of international cricket centuries by Chris Gayle =

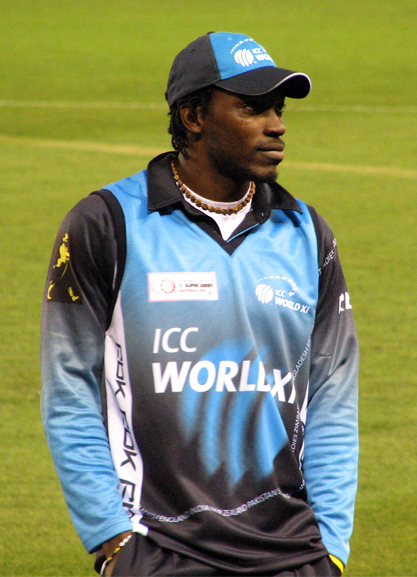
Gayle has scored 42 centuries for the West Indies.

Chris Gayle is a West Indian cricketer who captained the West Indies cricket team from 2007 to 2010. A left-handed batsman, he has scored centuries (100 or more runs in a single innings) in Test and One Day International (ODI) matches on fifteen and twenty-five occasions respectively. He has also scored century in Twenty20 International (T20I) cricket on two occasions. Gayle made his Test debut in March 2000 against Zimbabwe, scoring 33 and 0. He made his first Test century the following year, scoring 175 against the same team during the first match of the 2001 series between the teams. Gayle's first double century came in June 2002 against New Zealand when he scored 204 in a man of the match performance in Queen's Park. He scored his first triple century against South Africa at Antigua Recreation Ground in May 2005. His highest score of 333—fourth highest total for the West Indies—came against Sri Lanka at the Galle International Stadium in November 2010. (Note: Brian Lara made 400 not out and 375, and Garfield Sobers scored 365 not out.) Gayle is one of four players to score two triple centuries in Test cricket. (Note: The other three players to accomplish this feat are Donald Bradman, Brian Lara and Virender Sehwag.) He has scored centuries against seven different opponents, and has been most successful against New Zealand and South Africa, making three against each of them. He has scored Test centuries at twelve different cricket grounds, including eight at venues outside the West Indies.

Gayle made his ODI debut in 1999 against India, and his maiden century in the format came three years later against Kenya at the Simba Union Ground. His highest score of 215 came during the 2015 Cricket World Cup against Zimbabwe at the Manuka Oval, Canberra. With five scores over 150 in ODIs, he is joint-third in the list. (Note: He shares the position with India's Sachin Tendulkar.) Gayle has scored ODI centuries at nineteen different cricket grounds. Eighteen of his ODI centuries came at fifteen different venues outside the West Indies. Along with Shikhar Dhawan, Herschelle Gibbs, and Sourav Ganguly, Gayle holds the record for the most centuries in the ICC Champions Trophy, with three.

Having made his first T20I appearance in February 2006, Gayle became the first player to score a century in the format when he made 117 against South Africa in the first match of the 2007 ICC World Twenty20. As of July 2018, he is one of nine players to have scored more than one century in the format. As of 2019, he is eleventh overall—tied with Sanath Jayasuriya—among all-time century-makers in international cricket.

== Key ==
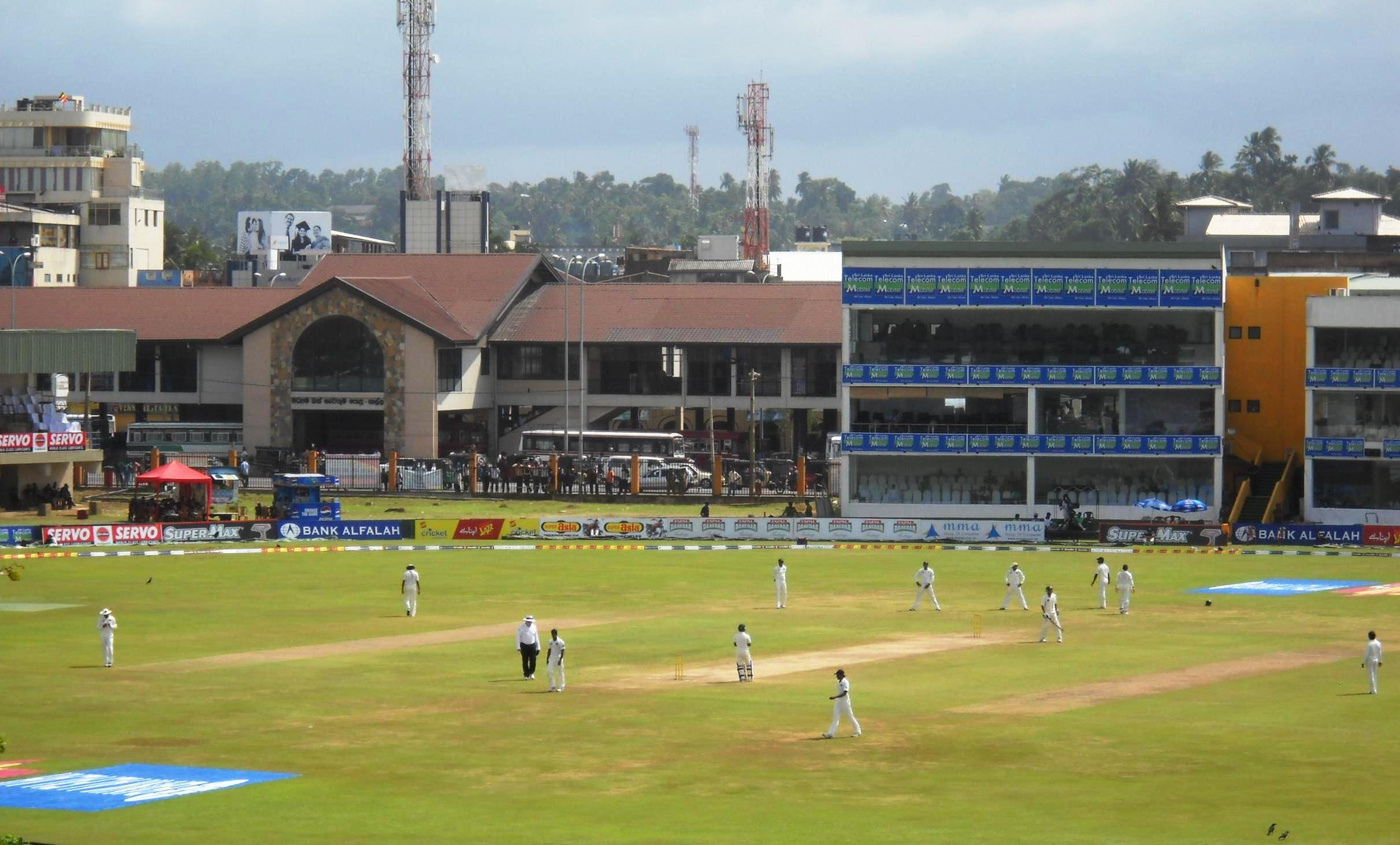
Gayle scored his highest Test score (333) at the Galle International Stadium in 2010.

Key for centuries' lists
Symbol	Meaning
*	Remained not out
†	Man of the match
‡	Captained the West Indies cricket team
Balls	Balls faced
Pos.	Position in the batting order
Inn.	The innings of the match
Test	The number of the Test match played in that series
S/R	Strike rate during the innings
H/A/N	Venue was at home (West Indies), away or neutral
Date	Date the match was held, or the starting date of match for Test matches
Lost	The match was lost by the West Indies.
Won	The match was won by the West Indies.
Drawn	The match was drawn.

== Test centuries ==
Test cricket centuries scored by Chris Gayle
No.	Score	Balls	Against	Pos.	Inn.	Test	S/R	Venue	H/A/N	Date	Result	Ref
1	175 †	255	Zimbabwe	2	2	1/2	68.62	Queens Sports Club, Bulawayo	Away	19 July 2001	Won	
2	204 †	332	New Zealand	1	2	2/2	61.44	Queen's Park, St. George's	Home	28 June 2002	Drawn	
3	116	120	South Africa	1	2	3/4	96.66	Newlands Cricket Ground, Cape Town	Away	2 January 2004	Drawn	
4	107	159	South Africa	1	3	4/4	67.20	SuperSport Park, Centurion	Away	16 January 2004	Lost	
5	141†	293	Bangladesh	2	2	1/2	48.12	Beausejour Cricket Ground, Gros Islet	Home	28 May 2004	Drawn	
6	105	87	England	1	3	4/4	120.68	The Oval, London	Away	19 August 2004	Lost	
7	317 †	483	South Africa	1	2	4/4	65.63	Antigua Recreation Ground, St. John's	Home	29 May 2005	Drawn	
8	197 †	396	New Zealand	1	3	2/2	49.74	McLean Park, Napier	Away	19 December 2008	Drawn	
9	104 ‡	193	England	1	2	1/5	53.88	Sabina Park, Kingston	Home	4 February 2009	Won	
10	102‡	170	England	1	2	5/5	60.00	Queen's Park Oval, Port of Spain	Home	6 March 2009	Drawn	
11	165*†‡	285	Australia	1	3	2/3	57.89	Adelaide Oval, Adelaide	Away	4 December 2009	Drawn	
12	102‡	72	Australia	1	2	3/3	141.66	WACA Ground, Perth	Away	16 December 2009	Lost	
13	333 †	437	Sri Lanka	1	1	1/3	76.20	Galle International Stadium, Galle	Away	15 November 2010	Drawn	
14	150	206	New Zealand	1	2	1/2	82.81	Sir Vivian Richards Stadium, Antigua	Home	25 July 2012	Won	
15	101	145	Zimbabwe	1	2	2/2	69.65	Windsor Park, Roseau	Home	20 March 2013	Won	

== One Day International centuries ==
ODI cricket centuries scored by Chris Gayle
No.	Score	Balls	Against	Pos.	Inn.	S/R	Venue	H/A/N	Date	Result	Ref
1	152 †	150	Kenya	1	1	101.33	Simba Union Ground, Nairobi	Away	15 August 2001	Won	
2	103 †	116	India	1	2	88.79	Vidarbha Cricket Association Ground, Nagpur	Away	9 November 2002	Won	
3	140 †	127	India	1	1	110.23	Sardar Patel Stadium, Ahmedabad	Away	15 November 2002	Lost	
4	101	107	India	1	2	94.39	IPCL Sports Complex Ground, Vadodara	Away	18 November 2002	Won	
5	119	151	Kenya	1	1	78.80	De Beers Diamond Oval, Kimberley	Neutral	4 March 2003	Won	
6	153* †	160	Zimbabwe	2	1	95.62	Queens Sports Club, Bulawayo	Away	22 November 2003	Won	
7	112* †	75	Zimbabwe	2	2	149.33	Harare Sports Club, Harare	Away	30 November 2003	Won	
8	152* †	153	South Africa	1	1	99.34	The Wanderers Stadium, Johannesburg	Away	4 February 2004	Lost	
9	132*	165	England	1	2	80.00	Lord's Cricket Ground, London	Away	6 July 2004	Won	
10	132	152	South Africa	1	2	86.84	Kensington Oval, Bridgetown	Home	11 May 2005	Lost	
11	124	137	Pakistan	1	2	90.51	Beausejour Cricket Ground, Gros Islet	Home	22 May 2005	Lost	
12	123	130	India	1	1	94.61	Sabina Park, Kingston	Home	18 May 2006	Lost	
13	104* †	118	Bangladesh	1	2	88.13	Sawai Mansingh Stadium, Jaipur	Neutral	11 October 2006	Won	
14	101 †	128	England	1	1	78.90	Sardar Patel Stadium, Ahmedabad	Neutral	28 October 2006	Lost	
15	133*†	135	South Africa	1	2	98.51	Sawai Mansingh Stadium, Jaipur	Neutral	2 November 2006	Won	
16	110*†‡	77	Canada	2	1	142.85	Maple Leaf Cricket Club, King City	Away	24 August 2008	Won	
17	113 †‡	106	Pakistan	1	1	106.60	Sheikh Zayed Cricket Stadium, Abu Dhabi	Neutral	12 November 2008	Lost	
18	122‡	137	Pakistan	1	2	89.05	Sheikh Zayed Cricket Stadium, Abu Dhabi	Neutral	16 November 2008	Lost	
19	135†‡	129	New Zealand	1	1	104.65	McLean Park, Napier	Away	13 January 2009	Lost	
20	125	107	New Zealand	2	1	116.82	Sabina Park, Kingston	Home	7 July 2012	Won	
21	109†	100	Sri Lanka	1	2	109.00	Sabina Park, Kingston	Home	28 June 2013	Won	
22	215†	147	Zimbabwe	1	1	146.25	Manuka Oval, Canberra	Neutral	24 February 2015	Won	
23	123	91	UAE	1	1	135.16	Old Hararians, Harare	Neutral	6 March 2018	Won	
24	135	129	England	1	1	104.65	Kensington Oval, Bridgetown	Home	20 February 2019	Lost	
25	162	97	England	1	2	167.01	Queen's Park, St. George's	Home	27 February 2019	Lost	

== Twenty20 International centuries ==
T20I cricket century by Chris Gayle
No.	Score	Balls	Against	Pos.	Inn.	S/R	Venue	H/A/N	Date	Result	Ref
1	117 †	57	South Africa	1	1	205.26	Wanderers Stadium, Johannesburg	Away	11 September 2007	Lost	
2	100* †	48	England	2	2	208.33	Wankhede Stadium, Mumbai	Neutral	16 March 2016	Won	
