= 2019 Ireland Tri-Nation Series =

International cricket tournament

- Date: 5–17 May 2019
- Location: Ireland
- Result: Bangladesh won the series
- Player of the series: (Cricket West Indies) Shai Hope
Teams
Bangladesh	Ireland	West Indies
Captains
Mashrafe Mortaza	William Porterfield	Jason Holder
Most runs
Soumya Sarkar (193)	Paul Stirling (207)	Shai Hope (470)
Most wickets
Mustafizur Rahman (6) Mashrafe Mortaza (6)	Boyd Rankin (5)	Shannon Gabriel (8)

The 2019 Ireland Tri-Nation Series was a cricket tournament that was held from 5 to 17 May in Ireland. It was a tri-nation series featuring Bangladesh, Ireland and the West Indies, with all the matches played as One Day Internationals (ODIs). The ODI fixtures were part of Bangladesh and West Indies' preparation for the 2019 Cricket World Cup. Bangladesh also played a 50-over warm-up match against Ireland A on 5 May 2019.

The West Indies were the first team to qualify for the final, after they beat hosts Ireland in the fourth match of the series. Bangladesh also qualified for the final, after they beat the West Indies in the fifth match. Bangladesh won the series, after beating the West Indies by five wickets in a rain-affected final. It was the first time that Bangladesh had won a multi-team international tournament.

== Squads ==
Bangladesh	Ireland	West Indies
Mashrafe Mortaza (c); Shakib Al Hasan (vc); Yasir Ali; Taskin Ahmed; Litton Das; Mehedi Hasan; Nayeem Hasan; Mosaddek Hossain; Rubel Hossain; Tamim Iqbal; Abu Jayed; Mahmudullah; Mohammad Mithun; Mushfiqur Rahim; Mustafizur Rahman; Sabbir Rahman; Farhad Reza; Mohammad Saifuddin; Soumya Sarkar	William Porterfield (c); Mark Adair; Andrew Balbirnie; George Dockrell; Josh Little; Andrew McBrine; Barry McCarthy; James McCollum; Tim Murtagh; Kevin O'Brien; Boyd Rankin; Paul Stirling; ~~Stuart Thompson~~; Lorcan Tucker; Gary Wilson	Jason Holder (c); Fabian Allen; Sunil Ambris; Darren Bravo; John Campbell; Jonathan Carter; Roston Chase; Sheldon Cottrell; Shane Dowrich; Shannon Gabriel; Shai Hope; Ashley Nurse; Raymon Reifer; Kemar Roach

In late April 2019, Taskin Ahmed and Farhad Reza were added to Bangladesh's squad. Mark Adair was added to Ireland's squad, replacing Stuart Thompson, who was ruled out due to injury. After initially naming a squad for their first two ODIs, Ireland named an unchanged squad for the remaining fixtures.

== Tour match ==
=== 50-over match: Ireland A vs Bangladesh ===
5 May 2019
11:45
Scorecard

Ireland A 307/8 (50 overs)	v	Bangladesh; 219 (42.4 overs)
James McCollum 102 (109); Taskin Ahmed 3/66 (10 overs)		Shakib Al Hasan 54 (43); Simi Singh 4/51 (9 overs)

Ireland A won by 88 runs
The Vineyard, Dublin
Umpires: Michael Foster (Ire) and Mary Waldron (Ire)

- Ireland A won the toss and elected to bat.

== Points table ==
Pos	Team	Pld	W	L	T	NR	BP	Pts	NRR
1	Bangladesh	4	3	0	0	1	0	14	0.622
2	West Indies	4	2	2	0	0	1	9	0.843
3	Ireland (H)	4	0	3	0	1	0	2	−1.783

(H) Host

== Fixtures ==
=== 1st ODI ===
5 May 2019
10:45
Scorecard

West Indies; 381/3 (50 overs)	v	Ireland; 185 (34.4 overs)
John Campbell 179 (137); Barry McCarthy 2/76 (10 overs)		Kevin O'Brien 68 (77); Ashley Nurse 4/51 (7.4 overs)

West Indies won by 196 runs
Clontarf Cricket Club Ground, Clontarf
Umpires: Aleem Dar (Pak) and Alan Neill (Ire)
Player of the match: John Campbell (WI)

- Ireland won the toss and elected to field.
- Shai Hope (WI) played in his 50th ODI.
- Andrew Balbirnie played in his 100th international match for Ireland.
- John Campbell (WI) scored his first century in ODIs.
- John Campbell and Shai Hope (WI) made the highest opening partnership in ODIs (365 runs). It was also the first time that both openers for the West Indies had scored 150 runs each in ODIs.
- Barry McCarthy (Ire) took his 50th wicket in ODIs.
- The West Indies made the highest total in Ireland in ODIs.

=== 2nd ODI ===
7 May 2019
10:45
Scorecard

West Indies; 261/9 (50 overs)	v	Bangladesh; 264/2 (45 overs)
Shai Hope 109 (132); Mashrafe Mortaza 3/49 (10 overs)		Tamim Iqbal 80 (116); Roston Chase 1/51 (10 overs)

Bangladesh won by 8 wickets
Clontarf Cricket Club Ground, Clontarf
Umpires: Aleem Dar (Pak) and Mark Hawthorne (Ire)
Player of the match: Shai Hope (WI)

- West Indies won the toss and elected to bat.
- Shane Dowrich (WI) made his ODI debut.
- Aleem Dar became the third umpire, and first from Pakistan, to officiate in 200 ODIs.
- Shai Hope became the fastest batsman for the West Indies, in terms of number of innings, to score 2,000 runs in ODIs (47).

=== 3rd ODI ===
9 May 2019
10:45
Scorecard

Ireland	v	Bangladesh

Match abandoned
The Village, Dublin
Umpires: Aleem Dar (Pak) and Mark Hawthorne (Ire)

- No toss.
- No play was possible due to rain.

=== 4th ODI ===
11 May 2019
10:45
Scorecard

Ireland; 327/5 (50 overs)	v	West Indies; 331/5 (47.5 overs)
Andrew Balbirnie 135 (124); Shannon Gabriel 2/47 (10 overs)		Sunil Ambris 148 (126); Boyd Rankin 3/65 (7.5 overs)

West Indies won by 5 wickets
The Village, Dublin
Umpires: Roland Black (Ire) and Richard Kettleborough (Eng)
Player of the match: Sunil Ambris (WI)

- Ireland won the toss and elected to bat.
- Sunil Ambris (WI) scored his first century in ODIs.
- This was the West Indies' highest successful run chase in ODIs.

=== 5th ODI ===
13 May 2019
10:45
Scorecard

West Indies; 247/9 (50 overs)	v	Bangladesh; 248/5 (47.2 overs)
Shai Hope 87 (108); Mustafizur Rahman 4/43 (9 overs)		Mushfiqur Rahim 63 (73); Ashley Nurse 3/53 (10 overs)

Bangladesh won by 5 wickets
The Village, Dublin
Umpires: Richard Kettleborough (Eng) and Alan Neill (Ire)
Player of the match: Mustafizur Rahman (Ban)

- West Indies won the toss and elected to bat.
- Raymon Reifer (WI) and Abu Jayed (Ban) both made their ODI debuts.

=== 6th ODI ===
15 May 2019
10:45
Scorecard

Ireland; 292/8 (50 overs)	v	Bangladesh; 294/4 (43 overs)
Paul Stirling 130 (141); Abu Jayed 5/58 (9 overs)		Litton Das 76 (67); Boyd Rankin 2/48 (7 overs)

Bangladesh won by 6 wickets
Clontarf Cricket Club Ground, Clontarf
Umpires: Roland Black (Ire) and Richard Kettleborough (Eng)
Player of the match: Abu Jayed (Ban)

- Ireland won the toss and elected to bat.
- Abu Jayed (Ban) took his first five-wicket haul in ODIs.
- Boyd Rankin (Ire) took his 200th wicket in international cricket.

== Final ==
17 May 2019
10:45
Scorecard

West Indies; 152/1 (24 overs)	v	Bangladesh; 213/5 (22.5 overs)
Shai Hope 74 (64); Mehedi Hasan 1/22 (4 overs)		Soumya Sarkar 66 (41); Raymon Reifer 2/23 (3.5 overs)

Bangladesh won by 5 wickets (DLS method)
The Village, Dublin
Umpires: Richard Kettleborough (Eng) and Paul Reynolds (Ire)
Player of the match: Mosaddek Hossain (Ban)

- Bangladesh won the toss and elected to field.
- Bangladesh were set a revised target of 210 runs from 24 overs due to rain.
