= List of players who have scored 10,000 or more runs in Test cricket =

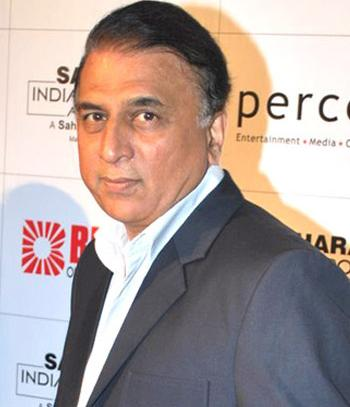
Sunil Gavaskar was the first player to cross the 10,000 run mark in Tests.

Scoring over 10,000 runs across a playing career in any format of cricket is considered a significant achievement. In the chase to achieve top scores, West Indian Garfield Sobers retired in 1974 as the most prolific run scorer in Test cricket, with a total of 8,032 runs. The record stood for nine years, until it was broken by England's Geoffrey Boycott in the 1982 series against India. Boycott remained the top scorer in the format until Indian batsman Sunil Gavaskar surpassed his tally two years later in 1983. In March 1987, Gavaskar became the first player to cross the 10,000 run mark in Tests during a match against Pakistan. As of January 2025, fifteen players—from seven teams that are Full Members of the International Cricket Council (ICC)—have scored 10,000 runs in Tests. Out of these, four are from Australia, three are from India, while two each are from England, Sri Lanka and the West Indies. One player each from Pakistan and South Africa form the rest. No player from Bangladesh, New Zealand, Afghanistan, Ireland or Zimbabwe has passed the 10,000 run mark in Tests yet.

Sachin Tendulkar holds multiple records—most appearances (200 matches), most runs (15,921) and highest numbers of both centuries (51) and half-centuries (68). In terms of innings, West Indian Brian Lara, Sachin Tendulkar and Kumar Sangakkara are the fastest (195) to reach the 10,000 run mark, while Australia's Steve Waugh is the slowest to achieve the feat (244). England's Joe Root is the fastest in terms of time span, taking 9 years and 174 days, while West Indian Shivnarine Chanderpaul's time span of 18 years and 37 days is the slowest among all. Joe Root and Alastair Cook share the record for the youngest player to score 10,000 runs, both reaching this milestone at the age of 31 years and 157 days, while Younis Khan the oldest. As of 2026, Joe Root and Steve Smith are the only active players in the format on this list.

== Players with 10,000 or more Test runs ==
- Career – denotes the year of debut and year of the latest match
- Mat. – denotes the number of matches played
- Inn. – denotes the number of innings batted
- No - denotes the number of innings the player remains not out
- HS - denotes the player highest score in this format
- Date – denotes the date on which the player reached the 10,000 run mark
- 10KI - denotes the number of innings the player took to reach 10,000 runs
- ^ – denotes that the player was at some time the leading run scorer in Tests
- † – denotes that the player is active in Tests

10,000 or more runs in Tests
No.	Player	Portrait	Team	Career	Mat.	Inn.	No	Runs	HS	Avg.	100s	50s	Age when reached	Date	10KI
1	Sachin Tendulkar ^	Sachin Tendulkar	India	1989-2013	200	329	33	15,921	248*	53.78	51	68	31 years and 326 days	16 March 2005	195
2	Joe Root †	Joe Root	England	2012–Present	169	309	26	14,278	262	50.45	41	69	31 years and 157 days	5 June 2022	218
3	Ricky Ponting	Ricky Ponting	Australia	1995-2012	168	287	29	13,378	257	51.85	41	62	33 years and 163 days	30 May 2008	196
4	Jacques Kallis	Jacques Kallis	South Africa	1995-2013	166	280	40	13,289	224	55.37	45	58	33 years and 134 days	27 February 2009	217
5	Rahul Dravid	Rahul Dravid	India	1996-2012	164	286	32	13,288	270	52.31	36	63	35 years and 78 days	29 March 2008	206
6	Alastair Cook	Alastair Cook	England	2006-2018	161	291	16	12,472	294	45.35	33	57	31 years and 157 days	30 May 2016	229
7	Kumar Sangakkara	Kumar Sangakkara	Sri Lanka	2000-2015	134	233	17	12,400	319	57.40	38	52	35 years and 61 days	26 December 2012	195
8	Brian Lara ^	Brian Lara	West Indies	1990-2006	131	232	6	11,953	400*	52.88	34	48	35 years and 106 days	15 August 2004	195
9	Shivnarine Chanderpaul	Shivnarine Chanderpaul	West Indies	1994-2015	164	280	49	11,867	203*	51.37	30	66	37 years and 254 days	26 April 2012	239
10	Mahela Jayawardene	Mahela Jayawardene	Sri Lanka	1997-2014	149	252	15	11,814	374	49.84	34	50	34 years and 213 days	26 December 2011	210
11	Allan Border ^	Allan Border	Australia	1978-1994	156	265	44	11,174	205	50.56	27	63	37 years and 159 days	2 January 1993	235
12	Steve Smith †	Steve Smith	Australia	2010-Present	127	227	28	11,003	239	55.29	37	45	35 years and 241 days	29 January 2025	205
13	Steve Waugh	Steve Waugh	Australia	1985-2004	168	260	46	10,927	200	51.06	32	50	37 years and 215 days	3 January 2003	244
14	Sunil Gavaskar ^	Sunil Gavaskar	India	1971-1987	125	214	16	10,122	236*	51.12	34	45	37 years and 240 days	7 March 1987	212
15	Younis Khan	Younus Khan	Pakistan	2000-2017	118	213	19	10,099	313	52.05	34	33	39 years and 145 days	23 April 2017	208
Last Updated: 22 October 2026

== By country ==
10,000 or more runs by country in Tests
Teams	Number of players
Australia	4
India	3
England	2
Sri Lanka	2
West Indies	2
Pakistan	1
South Africa	1
Total	15

== See also ==
- List of Test cricket records
- List of players who have scored 10,000 or more runs in One Day International cricket
