= List of players who have scored 10,000 or more runs in One Day International cricket =

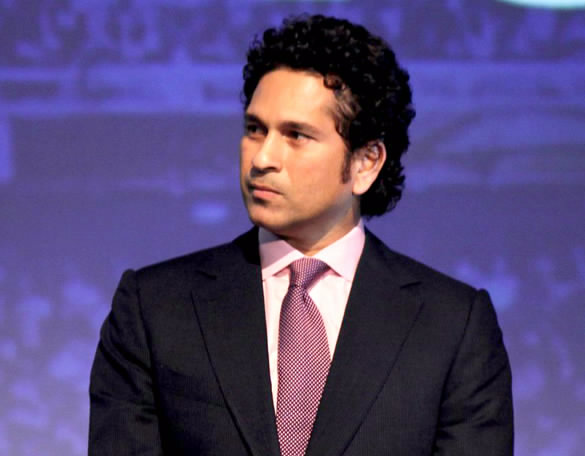
India's Sachin Tendulkar is the first player to cross the 10,000 run mark in ODIs.

Scoring over 10,000 runs across a playing career in any format of cricket is considered a significant achievement, while in the case of One Day Internationals (ODIs) it is often referred as the 10,000 run club in ODI cricket.

West Indian Desmond Haynes retired as the most prolific run scorer in ODIs, with a total of 8,648 runs in 1994. His record stood for four years until it was broken by India's Mohammed Azharuddin, who remained the top scorer in the format until his compatriot Tendulkar surpassed his tally in October 2000. In 2001, Tendulkar became the first player to cross the 10,000 run mark in ODIs, during the third match of the bilateral series against Australia at home. As of September 2023, fifteen players—from six teams that are Full Members of the International Cricket Council (ICC)—have scored 10,000 runs in ODIs. Out of these, six are from India, four are from Sri Lanka and two are from the West Indies. One player each from Australia, Pakistan and South Africa form the rest. No player from Bangladesh, England, New Zealand, Afghanistan, Ireland or Zimbabwe has passed the 10,000 run mark in ODIs yet.

In terms of innings, India's Virat Kohli—the fifth Indian to reach the milestone after Tendulkar, Sourav Ganguly, Rahul Dravid and MS Dhoni—is the fastest (205) to reach the 10,000 run mark, (Note: Kohli is also the fastest in terms of time span (10 years and 67 days).) while Sri Lanka's Mahela Jayawardene is the slowest to achieve the feat (333). Kohli also holds the record of highest number of centuries (55). Tendulkar holds multiple records—most appearances (463 matches), most runs (18,426) and half-centuries (96). Kohli has the highest average (58.00) and strike rate (93.71) among players who have performed the feat. Sri Lanka's Sanath Jayasuriya also features in the list of bowlers who have taken 300 or more wickets in the format. As of 2026, Virat Kohli and Rohit Sharma are the only active players in the format on this list.

== Key ==
- Career – denotes the years between the player's debut and the latest match
- Mat. – denotes the number of matches played
- Inn. – denotes the number of innings batted
- No - denotes the number of innings the player remains not out
- HS - denotes the player highest score in this format
- Date – denotes the date on which the player reached the 10,000 run mark
- Span – denotes the time span between the player's debut and the date on which the player reached the 10,000 run mark
- 10KI – denotes the number of innings the player took to reach 10,000 runs
- † – denotes that the player is active in ODIs

== Players with 10,000 or more ODI runs ==
10,000 or more runs in ODIs
No.	Player	Portrait	Team	Career	Mat.	Inn.	No	Runs	HS	Avg.	S/R	100s	50s	Date	Span	10KI
1	Sachin Tendulkar	Sachin Tendulkar	India	1989-2012	463	452	41	18,426	200*	44.83	86.23	49	96	31 March 2001	11 years, 103 days	259
2	Virat Kohli †	Virat Kohli	India	2008-Present	320	307	48	15,190	183	58.64	94.52	55	80	24 October 2018	10 years, 67 days	205
3	Kumar Sangakkara (Note: Sangakkara's aggregate includes matches played for Asia XI and ICC World XI.)	Kumar Sangakkara	Sri Lanka	2000-2015	404	380	41	14,234	169	41.98	78.86	25	93	17 February 2012	11 years, 227 days	296
4	Ricky Ponting (Note: Ponting's aggregate includes matches played for ICC World XI.)	Ricky Ponting	Australia	1995-2012	375	365	39	13,704	164	42.03	80.39	30	82	24 March 2007	12 years, 37 days	266
5	Sanath Jayasuriya (Note: Jayasuriya's aggregate includes matches played for Asia XI.)	Sanath Jayasuriya	Sri Lanka	1989-2011	445	433	18	13,430	189	32.36	91.20	28	68	9 August 2005	15 years, 226 days	328
6	Mahela Jayawardene (Note: Jayawardene's aggregate includes matches played for Asia XI.)	Mahela Jayawardene	Sri Lanka	1998-2015	448	418	39	12,650	144	33.37	78.96	19	77	18 November 2011	13 years, 289 days	333
7	Rohit Sharma †	Rohit Sharma	India	2007-Present	294	285	37	12,143	264	48.96	93.31	35	63	12 September 2023	16 years, 81 days	241
8	Inzamam-ul-Haq	Inzamam-ul-Haq	Pakistan	1991-2007	378	350	53	11,739	137*	39.52	74.24	10	83	19 September 2004	12 years, 302 days	299
9	Jacques Kallis (Note: Kallis' aggregate includes matches played for Africa XI and ICC World XI.)	Jacques Kallis	South Africa	1996-2014	328	314	53	11,579	139	44.36	72.89	17	86	23 January 2009	13 years, 14 days	272
10	Sourav Ganguly (Note: Ganguly's aggregate includes matches played for Asia XI.)	Sourav Ganguly	India	1992-2007	311	300	23	11,363	183	41.02	73.70	22	72	3 August 2005	13 years, 204 days (Note: After making his ODI debut in January 1992, Ganguly was dropped and made a comeback to the side in May 1996.)	263
11	Rahul Dravid (Note: Dravid also played for Asia XI and ICC World XI.)	Rahul Dravid	India	1996-2011	344	318	40	10,889	153	39.16	71.23	12	83	14 February 2007	10 years, 317 days	287
12	MS Dhoni (Note: Dhoni's aggregate includes matches played for Asia XI.)	MS Dhoni	India	2004-2019	350	297	84	10,773	183*	50.57	87.56	10	73	14 July 2018	13 years, 203 days	273
13	Chris Gayle (Note: Gayle's aggregate includes matches played for ICC World XI.) (Note: At age 39, he was also the oldest player to score 10,000 runs.)	Chris Gayle	West Indies	1999-2019	301	294	17	10,480	215	37.83	87.19	25	54	27 February 2019	19 years, 169 days	282
14	Brian Lara (Note: Lara's aggregate includes matches played for ICC World XI.)	Brian Lara	West Indies	1990-2007	299	289	32	10,405	169	40.48	79.51	19	63	16 December 2006	16 years, 37 days	278
15	Tillakaratne Dilshan	Tillakaratne Dilshan	Sri Lanka	1999-2016	330	303	41	10,290	161*	39.27	86.23	22	47	26 July 2015	15 years, 227 days	293

== By country ==
10,000 or more runs by country in ODIs
Teams	Number of players
India	6
Sri Lanka	4
West Indies	2
Australia	1
Pakistan	1
South Africa	1
Total	15

== See also ==
- List of One Day International cricket records
- List of players who have scored 10,000 or more runs in Test cricket
