= Wisden Leading Cricketer in the World =

Annual cricket award

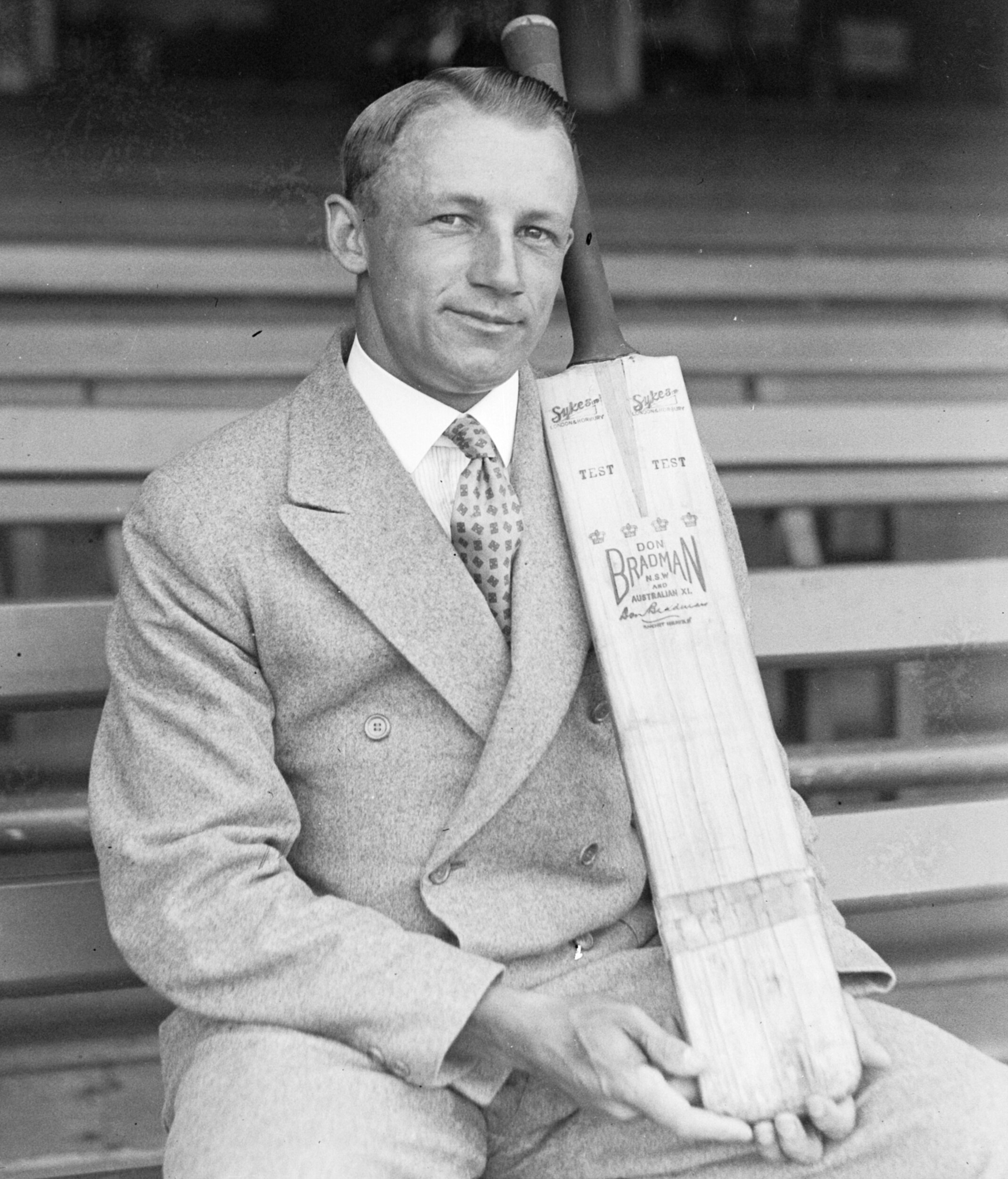
Don Bradman was retrospectively named as the notional winner ten times between 1930 and 1948.

The Wisden Men's Leading Cricketer in the World is an annual cricket award selected by Wisden Cricketers' Almanack. It was established in 2004, to select the best cricketer based upon their performances anywhere in the world in the previous calendar year. A notional list of previous winners, spanning from 1900 to 2002, was published in the 2007 edition of Wisden.

Since 1889, Wisden has published a list of Cricketers of the Year, typically selecting five cricketers that had the greatest impact during the previous English cricket season. However, in the 2000 edition, the editor Matthew Engel recognised that the best players in the world were typically no longer playing English domestic cricket, and opted to select the Cricketers of the Year based on their performances anywhere in the world. This criterion was applied for the following three years, but in 2004 it reverted to being based on the English season, and a Leading Cricketer in the World was also selected. The recipient of the award is selected by the editor of Wisden, with advice from cricket experts. An Australian, Ricky Ponting was chosen as the first winner of the award, for scoring 1,503 runs in international cricket, including eleven centuries during 2003.

In the 2007 edition of Wisden, a list of winners for previous years was published. A sixteen-person panel helped to select the winners, which Engel described as the cricketer that "would have been the first name down in the World XI to play Mars". It was decided that the first year that would be listed was 1900, as prior to that Engel claimed international cricket was too "inchoate and haphazard to make comparison sensible". No awards were made for the periods of the World Wars, leaving a list of 93 winners. During this selection, Don Bradman was listed the most, winning on ten occasions, while Garfield Sobers was the leading cricketer eight times. Engel noted that despite attempts to the contrary, the award maintains cricket's bias towards batsmen.

== List of award winners ==
=== Actual winners ===
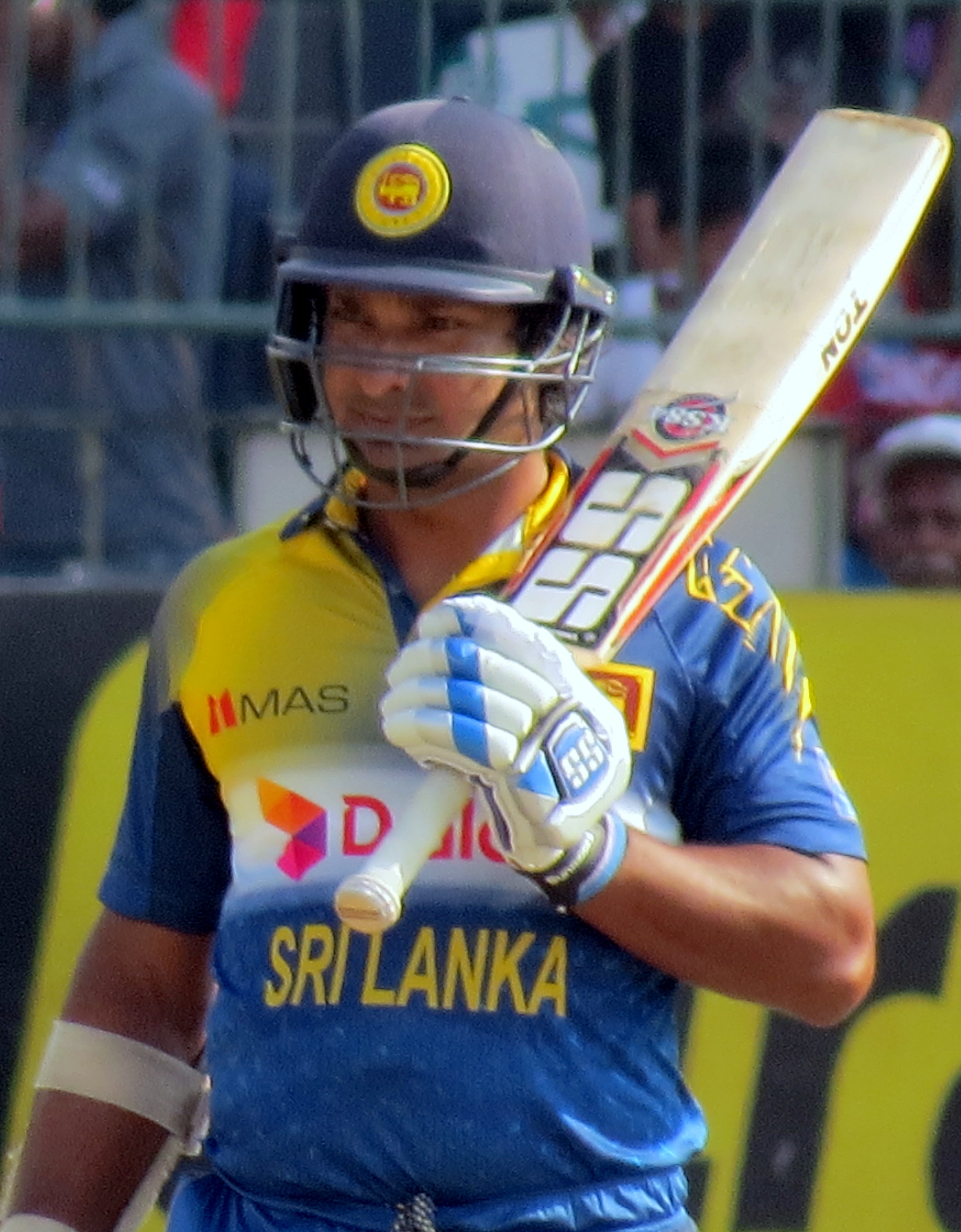
Kumar Sangakkara was twice recognised by Wisden in 2012, being named a Cricketer of the Year and Leading Cricketer in the World.

- Note that each year's Leading Cricketer of the World is announced in the following year's Wisden, so the 2003 winner was announced in 2004, and so on.

Year	Player	Country
2003	Ricky Ponting	Australia
2004	Shane Warne	Australia
2005	Andrew Flintoff	England
2006	Muttiah Muralitharan	Sri Lanka
2007	Jacques Kallis	South Africa
2008	Virender Sehwag	India
2009	Virender Sehwag	India
2010	Sachin Tendulkar	India
2011	Kumar Sangakkara	Sri Lanka
2012	Michael Clarke	Australia
2013	Dale Steyn	South Africa
2014	Kumar Sangakkara	Sri Lanka
2015	Kane Williamson	New Zealand
2016	Virat Kohli	India
2017	Virat Kohli	India
2018	Virat Kohli	India
2019	Ben Stokes	England
2020	Ben Stokes	England
2021	Joe Root	England
2022	Ben Stokes	England
2023	Pat Cummins	Australia
2024	Jasprit Bumrah	India
2025	Mitchell Starc	Australia

=== Notional winners ===
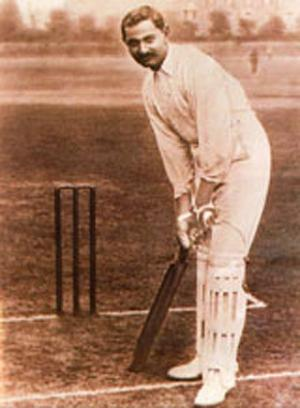
Ranjitsinhji was the first historical winner, being recognised for 1900.

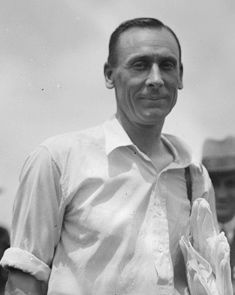
Jack Hobbs is one of only six players to have won the award more than twice.

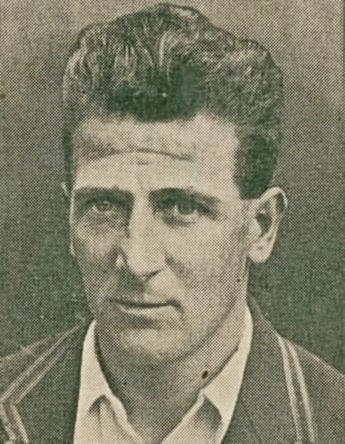
Harold Larwood was the only non-Australian cricketer to be recognised in the 1930s.

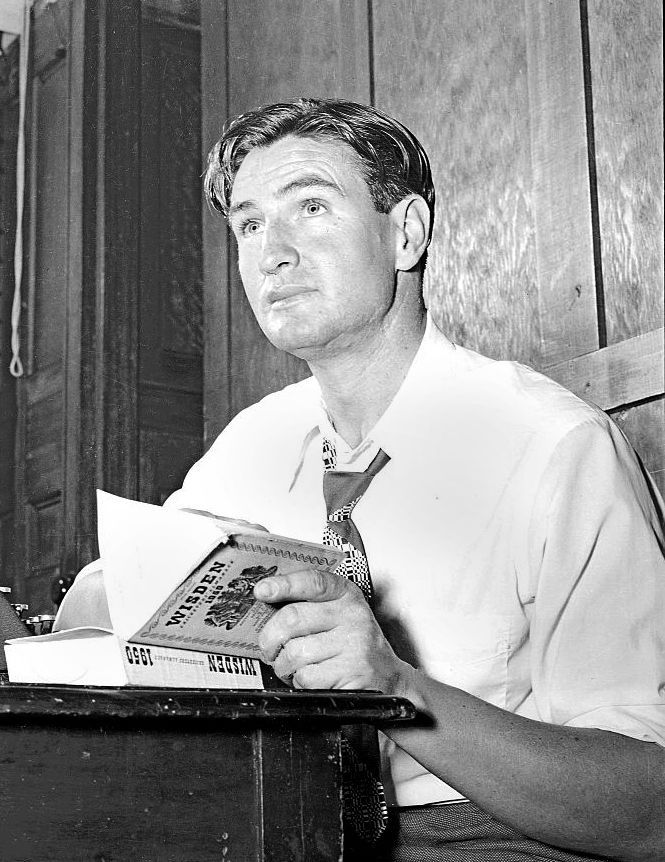
Keith Miller reading Wisden Cricketers' Almanack in 1951, his selection year

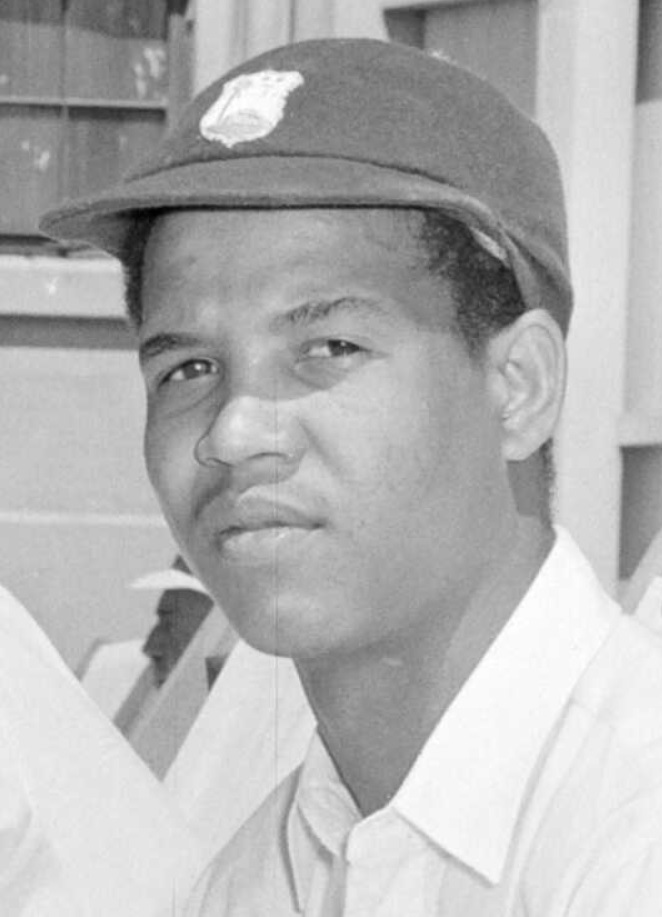
Garfield Sobers was the winner eight times between 1958 and 1970.

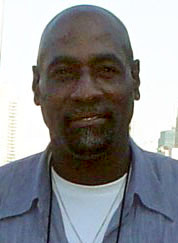
Viv Richards was recognised in 1976, 1978 and 1980

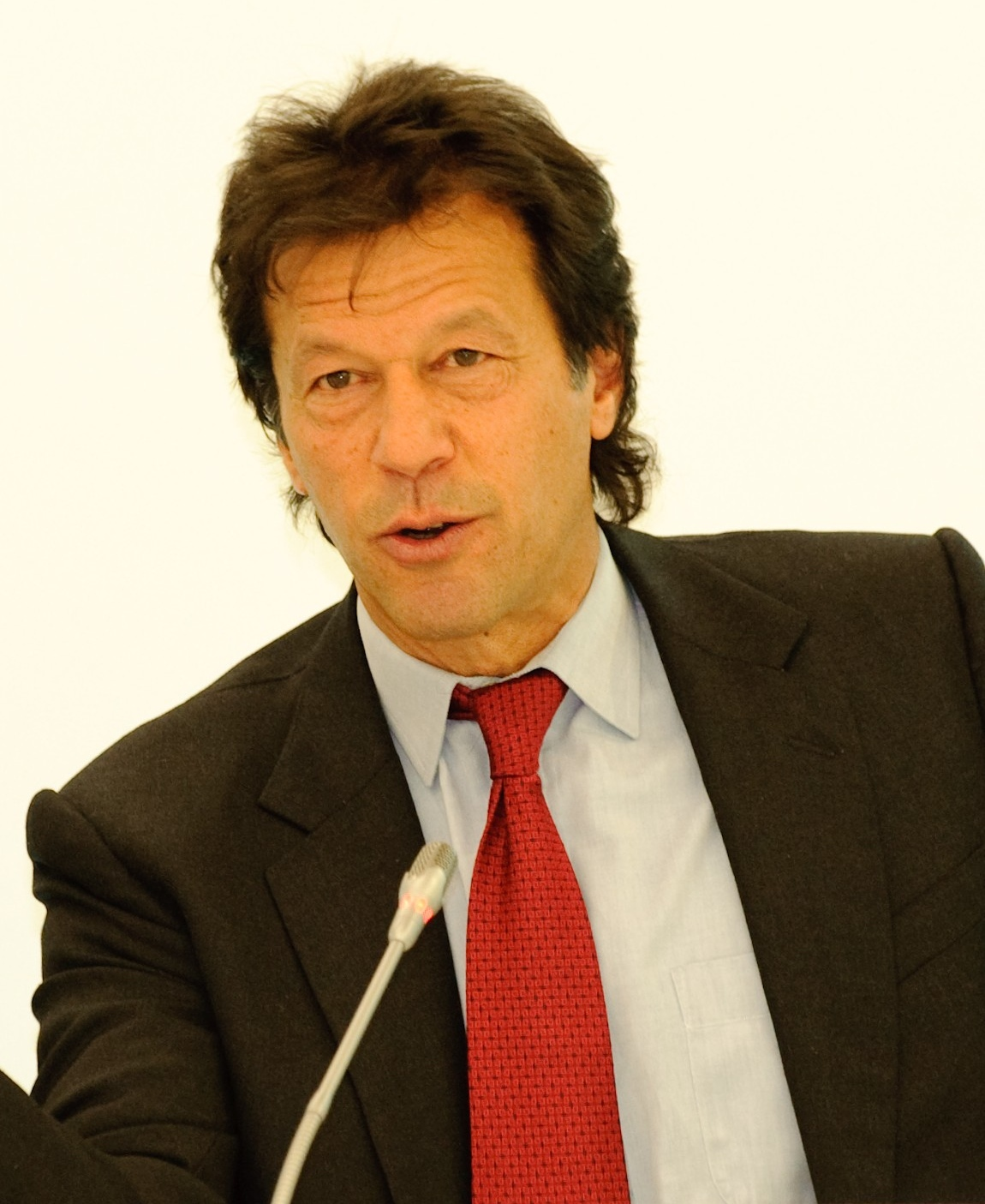
Imran Khan was the first Pakistani cricketer to be recognised, for 1982.

Year	Player	Country
1900	K. S. Ranjitsinhji	England
1901	C. B. Fry	England
1902	Victor Trumper	Australia
1903	C. B. Fry	England
1904	Bernard Bosanquet	England
1905	Stanley Jackson	England
1906	George Hirst	England
1907	Bert Vogler	South Africa
1908	Monty Noble	Australia
1909	Wilfred Rhodes	England
1910	Aubrey Faulkner	South Africa
1911	Victor Trumper	Australia
1912	Sydney Barnes	England
1913	Sydney Barnes	England
1914	Jack Hobbs	England
1915–18	Not awarded due to World War I	
1919	Jack Gregory	Australia
1920	Herbie Collins	Australia
1921	Charlie Macartney	Australia
1922	Jack Hobbs	England
1923	Patsy Hendren	England
1924	Maurice Tate	England
1925	Jack Hobbs	England
1926	Charlie Macartney	Australia
1927	Bill Ponsford	Australia
1928	Tich Freeman	England
1929	Wally Hammond	England
1930	Don Bradman	Australia
1931	Don Bradman	Australia
1932	Don Bradman	Australia
1933	Harold Larwood	England
1934	Don Bradman	Australia
1935	Stan McCabe	Australia
1936	Don Bradman	Australia
1937	Don Bradman	Australia
1938	Don Bradman	Australia
1939	Don Bradman	Australia
1940–45	Not awarded due to World War II	
1946	Don Bradman	Australia
1947	Denis Compton	England
1948	Don Bradman	Australia
1949	Len Hutton	England
1950	Frank Worrell	West Indies
1951	Keith Miller	Australia
1952	Len Hutton	England
1953	Alec Bedser	England
1954	Clyde Walcott	West Indies
1955	Frank Tyson	England
1956	Jim Laker	England
1957	Peter May	England
1958	Garfield Sobers	West Indies
1959	Richie Benaud	Australia
1960	Garfield Sobers	West Indies
1961	Alan Davidson	Australia
1962	Garfield Sobers	West Indies
1963	Fred Trueman	England
1964	Garfield Sobers	West Indies
1965	Garfield Sobers	West Indies
1966	Garfield Sobers	West Indies
1967	Graeme Pollock	South Africa
1968	Garfield Sobers	West Indies
1969	Graeme Pollock	South Africa
1970	Garfield Sobers	West Indies
1971	Mike Procter	South Africa
1972	Dennis Lillee	Australia
1973	Barry Richards	South Africa
1974	Jeff Thomson	Australia
1975	Clive Lloyd	West Indies
1976	Viv Richards	West Indies
1977	Dennis Lillee	Australia
1978	Viv Richards	West Indies
1979	Greg Chappell	Australia
1980	Viv Richards	West Indies
1981	Ian Botham	England
1982	Imran Khan	Pakistan
1983	Kapil Dev	India
1984	Joel Garner	West Indies
1985	Richard Hadlee	New Zealand
1986	Malcolm Marshall	West Indies
1987	Martin Crowe	New Zealand
1988	Malcolm Marshall	West Indies
1989	Allan Border	Australia
1990	Graham Gooch	England
1991	Curtly Ambrose	West Indies
1992	Wasim Akram	Pakistan
1993	Shane Warne	Australia
1994	Brian Lara	West Indies
1995	Brian Lara	West Indies
1996	Sanath Jayasuriya	Sri Lanka
1997	Shane Warne	Australia
1998	Sachin Tendulkar	India
1999	Steve Waugh	Australia
2000	Muttiah Muralitharan	Sri Lanka
2001	Glenn McGrath	Australia
2002	Matthew Hayden	Australia

== Multiple winners ==
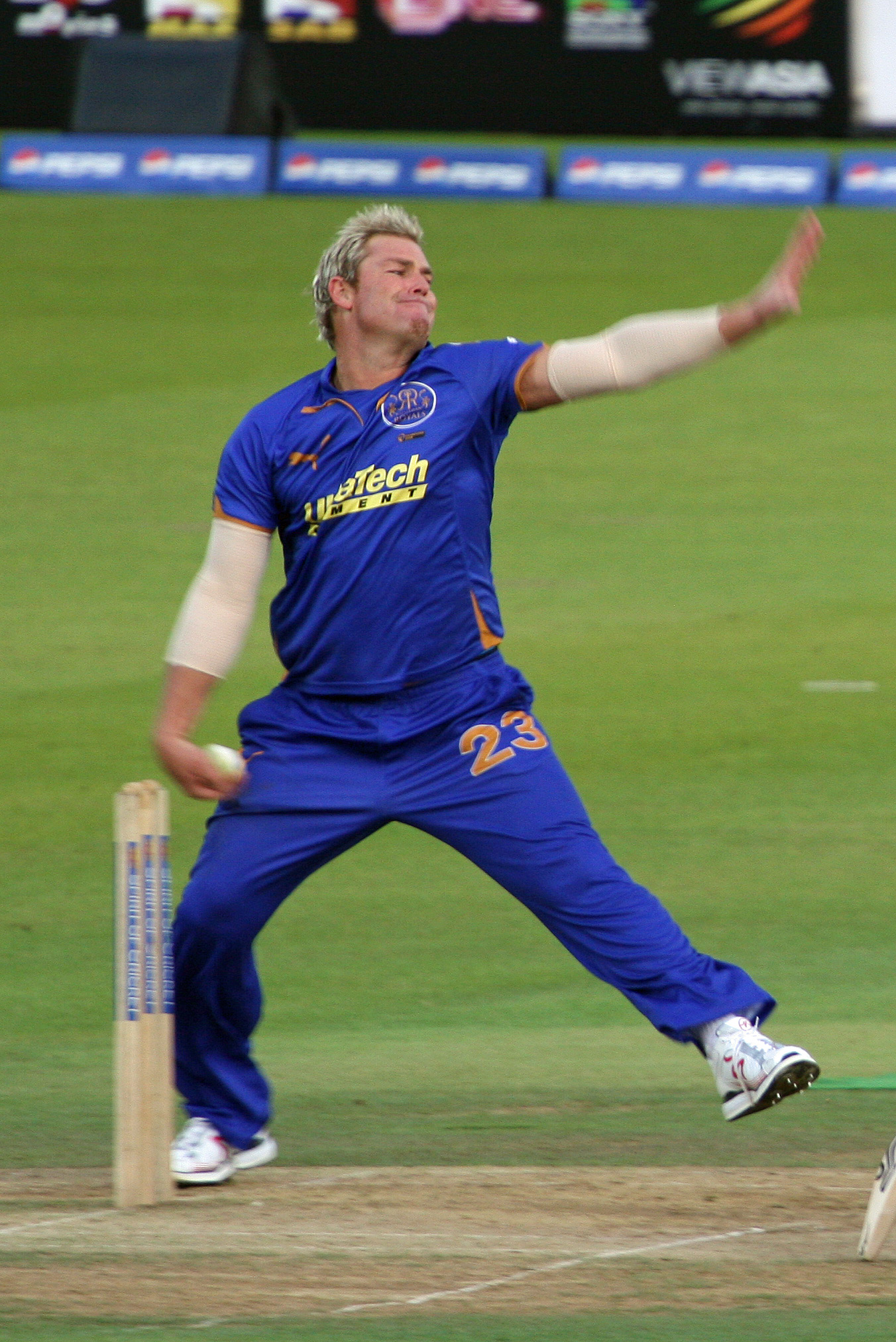
Shane Warne was listed twice in the historical list, as well as being recognised for 2004.

Unlike Wisden's Cricketers of the Year, players can be recognised more than once as the Leading Cricketer in the World, and eighteen players have been selected for multiple years. The majority of these have won the award twice, but seven players have been recognised for three or more years: Don Bradman, Garfield Sobers, Jack Hobbs, Viv Richards, Shane Warne, Virat Kohli and Ben Stokes. In the 2007 edition which published the notional historical winners, Engel noted with "surprise and pleasure" that the first five players were the same as had been selected as Wisden's five Cricketers of the Century.

Sachin Tendulkar and Warne have both been selected as notional and actual winners, while Virender Sehwag was the first player to be recognised twice by Wisden as an actual winner since 2004. Kumar Sangakkara has since similarly been selected twice, and in 2012 he became the first player to be recognised twice in one edition of Wisden, as both Leading Cricketer in the World and a Cricketer of the Year.

Player	Awards	Years
Don Bradman	10	1930, 1931, 1932, 1934, 1936, 1937, 1938, 1939, 1946, 1948
Garfield Sobers	8	1958, 1960, 1962, 1964, 1965, 1966, 1968, 1970
Jack Hobbs	3	1914, 1922, 1925
Virat Kohli	3	2016, 2017, 2018
Viv Richards	3	1976, 1978, 1980
Ben Stokes	3	2019, 2020, 2022
Shane Warne	3	1993, 1997, 2004
Sydney Barnes	2	1912, 1913
C. B. Fry	2	1901, 1903
Len Hutton	2	1949, 1952
Brian Lara	2	1994, 1995
Dennis Lillee	2	1972, 1977
Charlie Macartney	2	1921, 1926
Malcolm Marshall	2	1986, 1988
Muttiah Muralitharan	2	2000, 2006
Graeme Pollock	2	1967, 1969
Kumar Sangakkara	2	2011, 2014
Virender Sehwag	2	2008, 2009
Sachin Tendulkar	2	1998, 2010
Victor Trumper	2	1902, 1911

== Winners by country ==
Awards won by nationality (%)
1. Australia – 37 (31.9%)
2. England – 32 (27.6%)
3. West Indies – 20 (17.2%)
4. India – 9 (7.80%)
5. South Africa – 8 (6.90%)
6. Sri Lanka – 5 (4.30%)
7. New Zealand – 3 (2.60%)
8. Pakistan – 2 (1.70%)

Cricketers from eight of the twelve Test playing nations have been recognised for the award by Wisden, with Bangladesh, Zimbabwe, Ireland and Afghanistan not represented. Players from Australia and England dominate the list, having won more than half of the time, although this is disproportionately the case in the notional list. Prior to World War II, 34 of the 36 winners played for Australia or England. The "actual" award winners are more evenly distributed; Indian players have won seven times, English players five times and Australian players five times, whilst players from Sri Lanka have received the award on three occasions since 2004.

Awards by country
Country	Awards
Australia	37
England	32
West Indies	20
India	9
South Africa	8
Sri Lanka	5
New Zealand	3
Pakistan	2

== See also ==
- Six Giants of the Wisden Century
- Wisden Australia's Cricketer of the Year
- Wisden Cricketers of the Century
- ICC Awards
