= ICC Cricket Hall of Fame =

Hall of fame for cricket

- Sport: Cricket
- Awarded for: Achievements of the legends of the game from cricket's long and illustrious history

History
- First award: 2009

The ICC Cricket Hall of Fame recognizes "the achievements of the legends of the game from cricket's long and illustrious history". It was launched by the International Cricket Council (ICC) in Dubai on January 2 2009, in association with the Federation of International Cricketer's Associations (FICA), as part of the ICC's centenary celebrations. The initial inductees were the 55 players included in the FICA Hall of Fame which ran from 1999 to 2003, but further members are added each year during the ICC Awards ceremony. The inaugural inductees ranged from W. G. Grace, who retired from Test cricket in 1899, to Graham Gooch, who played his last Test match in 1995. Living inductees receive a commemorative cap; Australian Rod Marsh was the first member of the initial inductees to receive his. Members of the Hall of Fame assist in the selection of future inductees.

After Sana Mir who never played a Test match due to her team’s cessation of playing in whites prior to her career, South African Barry Richards played the fewest Test matches during his career with four, before South Africa were excluded from participating in international cricket in 1970. Indian Sachin Tendulkar, inducted in July 2019, played the most Tests with 200 in an international career spanning 24 years. Out of the 122 inductees in the ICC Cricket Hall of Fame, 86 are from England, Australia and the West Indies, while the other 39 inductees are from the remaining Test playing nations, India, New Zealand, Pakistan, South Africa, Sri Lanka and Zimbabwe.

As of 2026, there are 16 women in the Hall of Fame. In 2010, Rachael Heyhoe Flint, the former England captain who led her team to victory at the inaugural Women's World Cup in 1973, became the first woman in the Hall of Fame; the other female members are Belinda Clark, inducted in 2011, Enid Bakewell, inducted in 2012, Debbie Hockley, inducted in 2013, Betty Wilson, inducted in 2015, Karen Rolton, inducted in 2016, Claire Taylor, inducted in 2018, Cathryn Fitzpatrick, inducted in 2019 Lisa Sthalekar, inducted in 2020, Jan Brittin, inducted in 2021, Charlotte Edwards inducted in 2022, Diana Edulji, inducted in 2023, Neetu David, inducted in 2024, Sana Mir & Sarah Taylor inducted in 2025 and Anjum Chopra inducted in 2026.

A player has to be retired from all forms of international cricket for at least five years to be eligible.

== Inductees ==
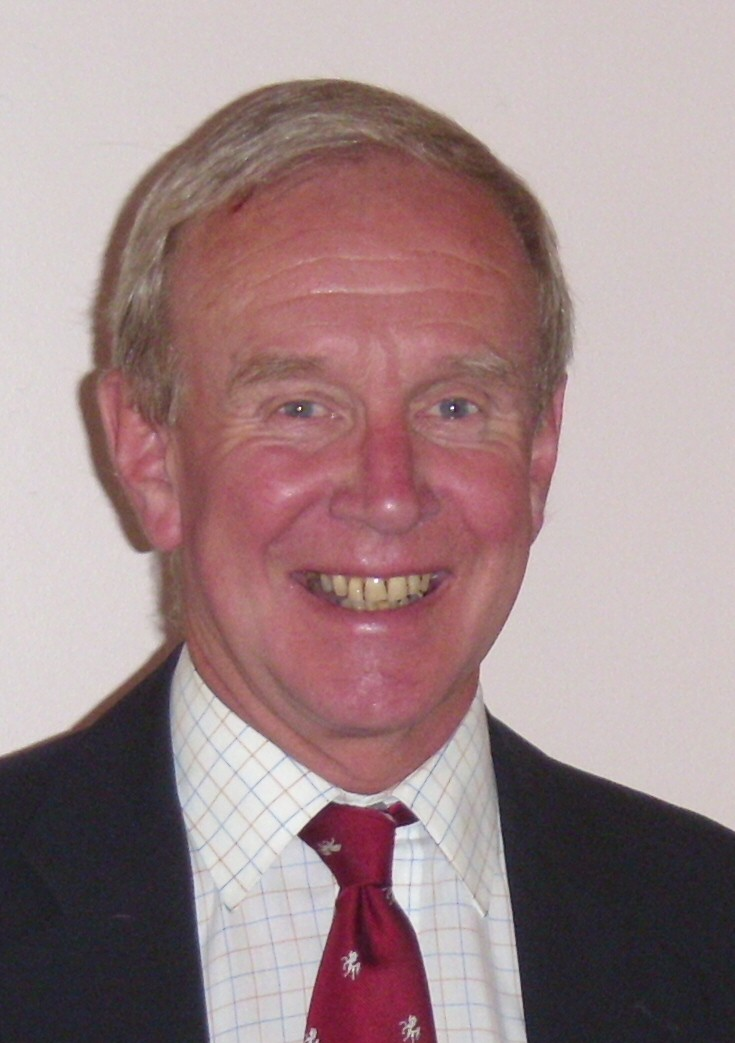
Derek Underwood was one of the 55 inaugural members of the Hall of Fame.

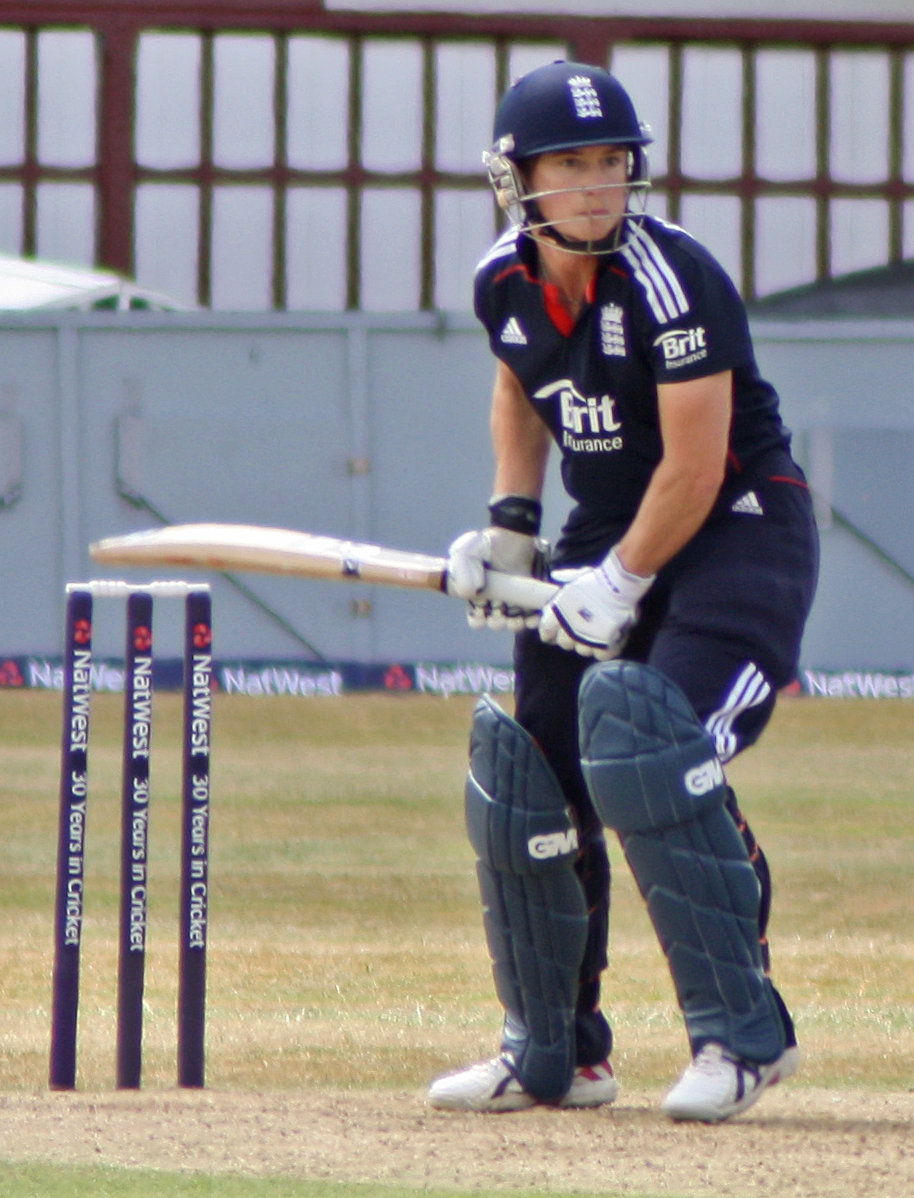
Claire Taylor is one of 16 women in the Hall of Fame, having been inducted in 2018.

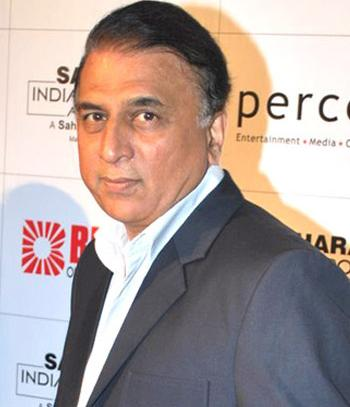
Sunil Gavaskar set world records during his career for the most Test runs and most Test centuries scored by any batsman.

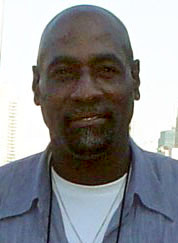
Viv Richards represented the West Indies 121 times in Test cricket.

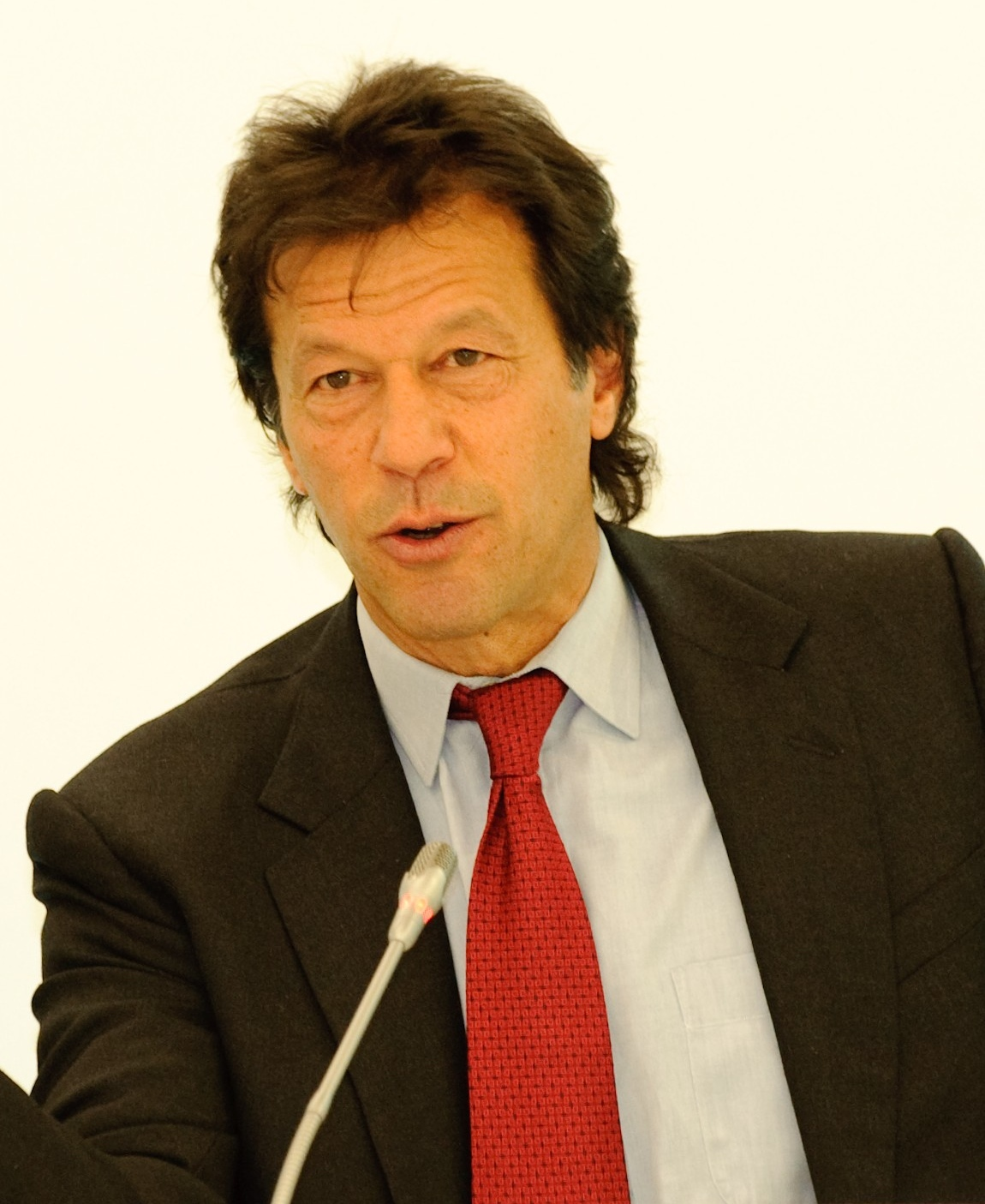
Pakistani cricketer Imran Khan represented his country in 88 Test matches.

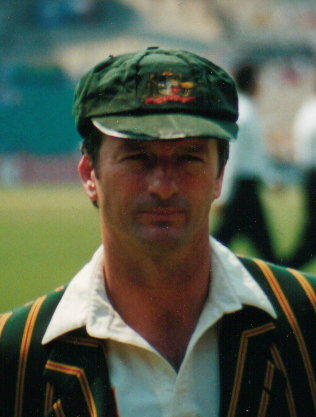
Steve Waugh played for Australia in 168 Test matches over 20 years.

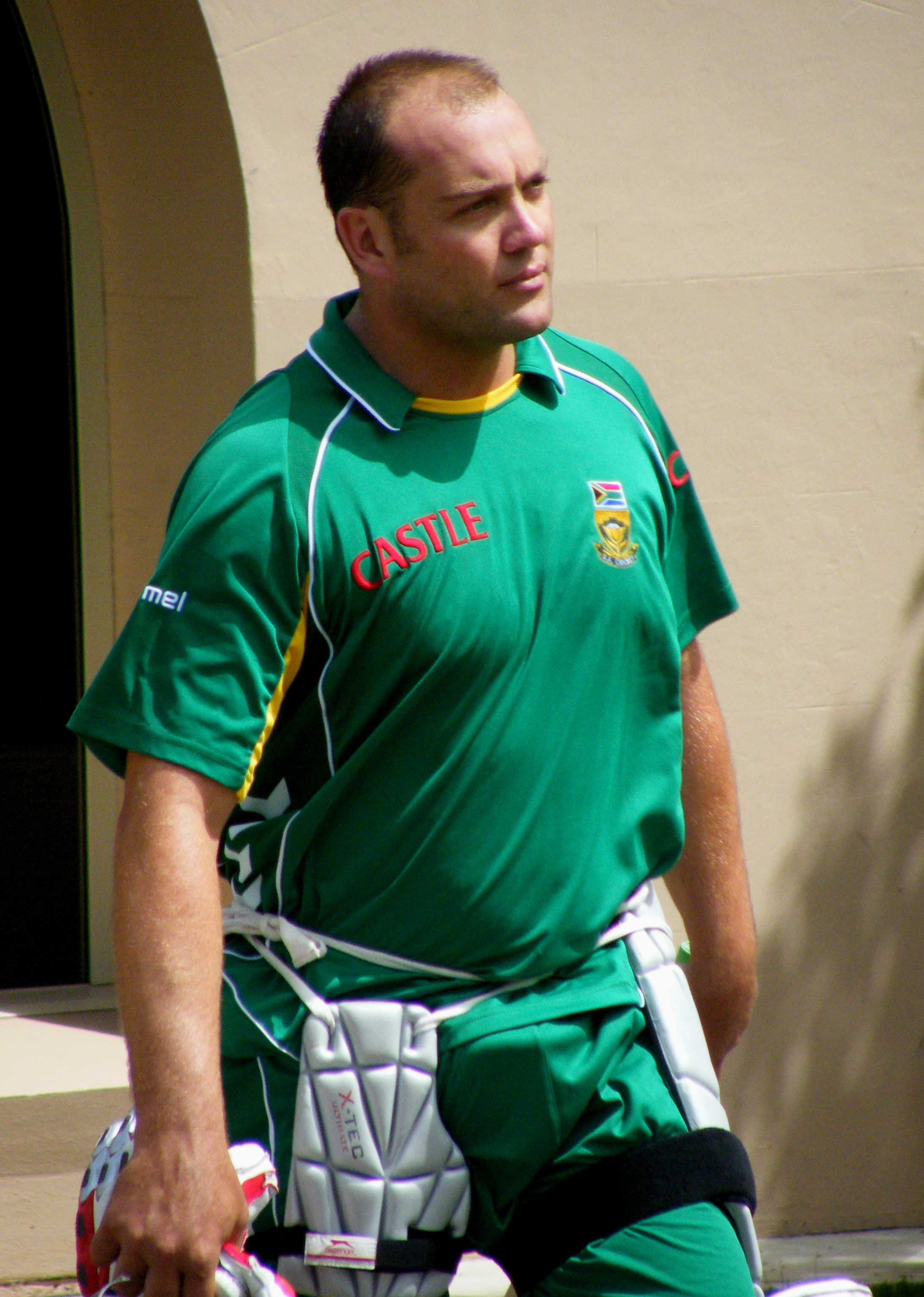
Jacques Kallis, the first and only all-rounder to achieve the doubles of 10,000 runs and 250 wickets in Tests and One Day Internationals.

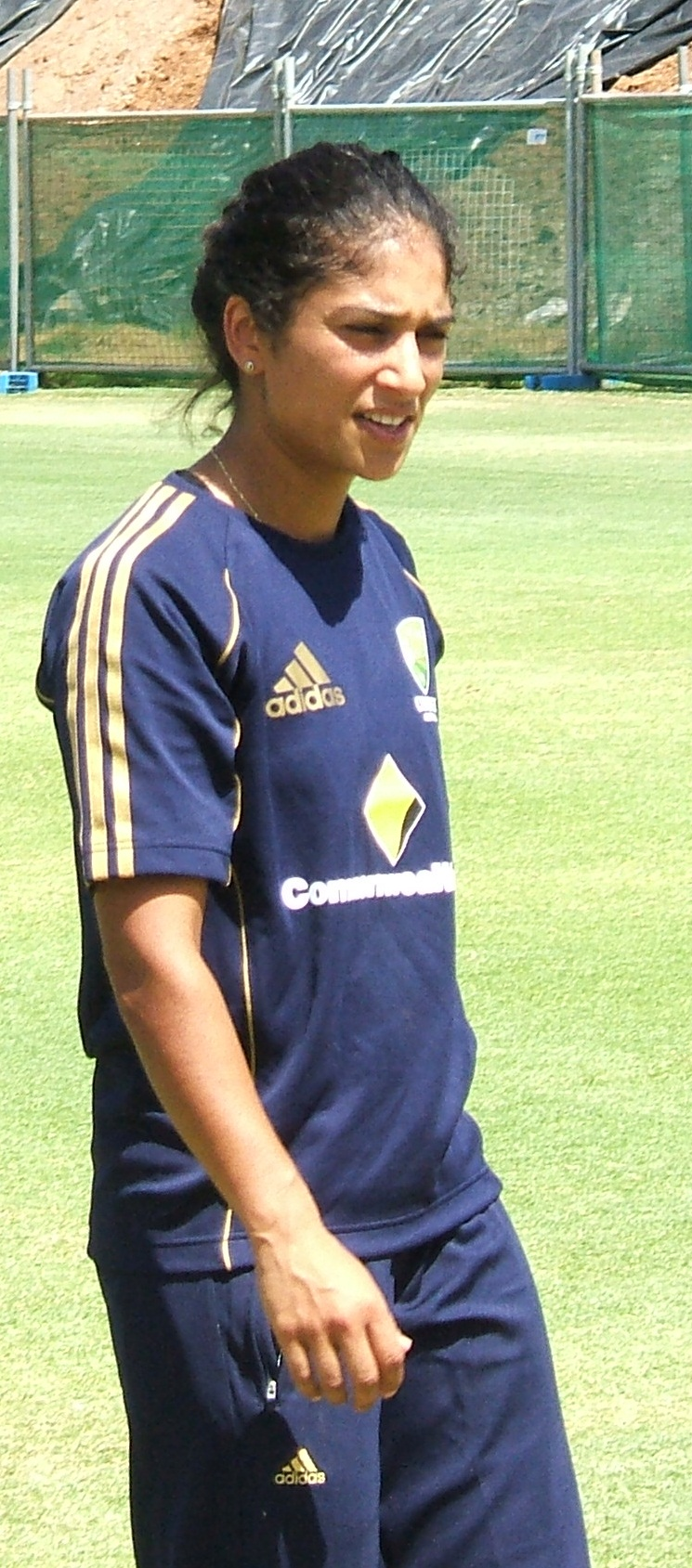
Lisa Sthalekar, the first player to achieve the double of 2,000 runs and 100 wickets in Women's One Day Internationals.

	Men's player
	Women's player
^{+}	Inaugural member inducted in January 2009

Inductee	Nationality	Induction year	Tests		ODIs		Ref.
Inductee	Nationality	Induction year	Matches	Span	Matches	Span	Ref.
Zaheer Abbas	Pakistan	2020	78	1969–1985	62	1974–1985	
Wasim Akram	Pakistan	2009	104	1984–2003	356	1984–2003	
Hashim Amla	South Africa	2025	124	2004–2019	181	2008–2019	
Curtly Ambrose	West Indies	2011	98	1988–2000	176	1988–2000	
Enid Bakewell	England	2012	12	1968–1979	23	1973–1982	
Sydney Barnes	England	2009^{+}	27	1901–1914	0	N/A	
Ken Barrington	England	2010	82	1955–1968	0	N/A	
Bishan Bedi	India	2009^{+}	67	1966–1979	10	1974–1979	
Alec Bedser	England	2009^{+}	51	1946–1955	0	N/A	
Richie Benaud	Australia	2009^{+}	63	1952–1964	0	N/A	
Allan Border	Australia	2009^{+}	156	1978–1994	273	1979–1994	
Ian Botham	England	2009^{+}	102	1977–1992	116	1976–1992	
Geoffrey Boycott	England	2009^{+}	108	1964–1982	36	1971–1981	
Don Bradman	Australia	2009^{+}	52	1928–1948	0	N/A	
Jan Brittin	England	2021	27	1979–1998	63	1979–1998	
Greg Chappell	Australia	2009^{+}	87	1970–1984	74	1971–1983	
Ian Chappell	Australia	2009^{+}	75	1964–1980	16	1971–1980	
Anjum Chopra	India	2026	12	1995–2006	127	1995–2012	
Belinda Clark	Australia	2011	15	1991–2005	118	1991–2005	
Shiv Chanderpaul	West Indies	2022	164	1994–2015	268	1994–2011	
Denis Compton	England	2009^{+}	78	1937–1957	0	N/A	
Learie Constantine	West Indies	2021	18	1928–1939	0	N/A	
Alastair Cook	England	2024	161	2006–2018	92	2006–2014	
Colin Cowdrey	England	2009^{+}	114	1954–1975	1	1971–1971	
Martin Crowe	New Zealand	2015	77	1982–1995	143	1982–1995	
Alan Davidson	Australia	2011	44	1953–1963	0	N/A	
Neetu David	India	2024	10	1995–2006	97	1995–2008	
Aravinda de Silva	Sri Lanka	2023	93	1984–2002	308	1984–2003	
Kapil Dev	India	2009^{+}	131	1979–1994	225	1978–1994	
Ted Dexter	England	2021	62	1958–1968	0	N/A	
MS Dhoni	India	2025	90	2005–2014	350	2004–2019	
Allan Donald	South Africa	2019	72	1992–2002	164	1991–2003	
Rahul Dravid	India	2018	164	1996–2012	344	1996–2011	
Diana Edulji	India	2023	20	1976–1991	34	1978–1993	
Charlotte Edwards	England	2022	23	1996–2015	191	1997–2016	
Aubrey Faulkner	South Africa	2021	25	1906–1924	0	N/A	
Cathryn Fitzpatrick	Australia	2019	13	1991–2006	109	1993–2007	
Andy Flower	Zimbabwe	2021	63	1992–2002	213	1992–2003	
Joel Garner	West Indies	2010	58	1977–1987	98	1977–1987	
Sunil Gavaskar	India	2009^{+}	125	1971–1987	108	1974–1987	
Sourav Ganguly	India	2026	113	1996–2008	311	1992–2007	
Lance Gibbs	West Indies	2009^{+}	79	1958–1976	3	1973–1975	
Adam Gilchrist	Australia	2013	96	1999–2008	287	1996–2008	
Graham Gooch	England	2009^{+}	118	1975–1995	125	1976–1995	
David Gower	England	2009^{+}	117	1978–1992	114	1978–1991	
W. G. Grace	England	2009^{+}	22	1880–1899	0	N/A	
Tom Graveney	England	2009^{+}	79	1951–1969	0	N/A	
Gordon Greenidge	West Indies	2009^{+}	108	1974–1991	128	1975–1991	
Clarrie Grimmett	Australia	2009	37	1925–1936	0	N/A	
Richard Hadlee	New Zealand	2009^{+}	86	1973–1990	115	1973–1990	
Wes Hall	West Indies	2015	48	1958–1969	0	N/A	
Wally Hammond	England	2009^{+}	85	1927–1947	0	N/A	
Neil Harvey	Australia	2009^{+}	79	1948–1963	0	N/A	
Matthew Hayden	Australia	2025	103	1994–2009	161	1993–2008	
Desmond Haynes	West Indies	2021	116	1978–1994	238	1978–1994	
George Headley	West Indies	2009^{+}	22	1930–1954	0	N/A	
Rachael Heyhoe Flint	England	2010	22	1960–1979	23	1973–1982	
Jack Hobbs	England	2009^{+}	61	1908–1930	0	N/A	
Debbie Hockley	New Zealand	2014	19	1979–1996	118	1982–2000	
Michael Holding	West Indies	2009^{+}	60	1975–1987	102	1976–1987	
Len Hutton	England	2009^{+}	79	1937–1955	0	N/A	
Mahela Jayawardene	Sri Lanka	2021	149	1997–2014	448	1998–2015	
Jacques Kallis	South Africa	2020	166	1995–2013	328	1996–2014	
Rohan Kanhai	West Indies	2009^{+}	79	1957–1974	7	1973–1975	
Imran Khan	Pakistan	2009^{+}	88	1971–1992	175	1974–1992	
Alan Knott	England	2009^{+}	95	1967–1981	20	1971–1977	
Anil Kumble	India	2015	132	1990–2008	271	1990–2007	
Jim Laker	England	2009^{+}	46	1948–1959	0	N/A	
Brian Lara	West Indies	2012	131	1990–2006	299	1990–2007	
Harold Larwood	England	2009^{+}	21	1926–1933	0	N/A	
Dennis Lillee	Australia	2009^{+}	70	1971–1984	63	1972–1983	
Ray Lindwall	Australia	2009^{+}	61	1946–1960	0	N/A	
Clive Lloyd	West Indies	2009^{+}	110	1966–1984	87	1973–1985	
George Lohmann	England	2016	18	1886–1896	0	N/A	
Vinoo Mankad	India	2021	44	1946–1959	0	N/A	
Rod Marsh	Australia	2009^{+}	96	1970–1984	92	1971–1984	
Malcolm Marshall	West Indies	2009^{+}	81	1978–1991	136	1980–1992	
Peter May	England	2009^{+}	66	1951–1961	0	N/A	
Stan McCabe	Australia	2021	39	1930–1938	0	N/A	
Glenn McGrath	Australia	2012	124	1993–2007	250	1993–2007	
Javed Miandad	Pakistan	2009^{+}	124	1976–1993	233	1975–1996	
Keith Miller	Australia	2009^{+}	55	1946–1956	0	N/A	
Sana Mir	Pakistan	2025	0	N/A	120	2005–2019	
Hanif Mohammad	Pakistan	2009^{+}	55	1952–1969	0	N/A	
Arthur Morris	Australia	2016	46	1946–1955	0	N/A	
Muttiah Muralitharan	Sri Lanka	2016	133	1992–2010	350	1993–2011	
Monty Noble	Australia	2021	42	1898–1909	0	N/A	
Bill O'Reilly	Australia	2009^{+}	27	1932–1946	0	N/A	
Kevin Pietersen	England	2026	104	2005–2014	136	2004–2013	
Graeme Pollock	South Africa	2009^{+}	23	1963–1970	0	N/A	
Shaun Pollock	South Africa	2021	108	1995–2008	303	1996–2008	
Ricky Ponting	Australia	2018	168	1995–2012	375	1995–2012	
Abdul Qadir	Pakistan	2022	67	1977–1990	104	1983–1993	
Wilfred Rhodes	England	2009^{+}	58	1899–1930	0	N/A	
Barry Richards	South Africa	2009^{+}	4	1970	0	N/A	
Viv Richards	West Indies	2009^{+}	121	1974–1991	187	1975–1991	
Andy Roberts	West Indies	2009^{+}	47	1974–1983	56	1975–1983	
Karen Rolton	Australia	2016	14	1995–2009	141	1995–2009	
Kumar Sangakkara	Sri Lanka	2021	134	2000–2015	404	2000–2015	
Virender Sehwag	India	2023	104	2001–2013	251	1999–2013	
Bob Simpson	Australia	2014	62	1957–1978	2	1978–1978	
Graeme Smith	South Africa	2025	117	2002–2014	197	2002–2013	
Garfield Sobers	West Indies	2009^{+}	93	1954–1974	1	1973	
Fred Spofforth	Australia	2011	18	1877–1887	0	N/A	
Brian Statham	England	2009^{+}	70	1951–1965	0	N/A	
Lisa Sthalekar	Australia	2020	8	2003–2011	125	2001–2013	
Herbert Sutcliffe	England	2009	54	1924–1935	0	N/A	
Claire Taylor	England	2018	15	1999–2009	126	1998–2011	
Sarah Taylor	England	2025	10	2006–2019	126	2006–2019	
Sachin Tendulkar	India	2019	200	1989–2013	463	1989–2012	
Fred Trueman	England	2009^{+}	67	1952–1965	0	N/A	
Victor Trumper	Australia	2009	48	1899–1912	0	N/A	
Derek Underwood	England	2009^{+}	86	1966–1982	26	1973–1982	
Daniel Vettori	New Zealand	2025	113	1997–2014	295	1997–2015	
AB de Villiers	South Africa	2024	114	2004–2018	228	2005–2018	
Clyde Walcott	West Indies	2009^{+}	44	1948–1960	0	N/A	
Courtney Walsh	West Indies	2010	132	1984–2001	205	1985–2000	
Shane Warne	Australia	2013	145	1992–2007	194	1993–2005	
Steve Waugh	Australia	2009	168	1985–2004	325	1986–2002	
Everton Weekes	West Indies	2009^{+}	48	1948–1958	0	N/A	
Bob Willis	England	2021	90	1971–1984	64	1973–1984	
Betty Wilson	Australia	2015	11	1948–1958	0	N/A	
Frank Woolley	England	2009^{+}	64	1909–1934	0	N/A	
Frank Worrell	West Indies	2009^{+}	51	1948–1963	0	N/A	
Waqar Younis	Pakistan	2013	87	1989–2003	262	1989–2003	

== By team ==
Country	Number of members	Male Hall of Famers	Female Hall of Famers	Span
England	35		6	1877–present
Australia	30	25	5	1877–present
West Indies	21	21	-	1928–present
India	13	10	3	1932–present
South Africa	9	9	-	1889–present
Pakistan	8	7	1	1952–present
Sri Lanka	4	4	-	1982–present
New Zealand	4	3	1	1930–present
Zimbabwe	1	1	-	1992–present
Total	125	109	16	1877 - present

== See also ==
- Australian Cricket Hall of Fame
- Wisden Cricketers of the Century
- Six Giants of the Wisden Century
