= List of international cricket centuries by Viv Richards =

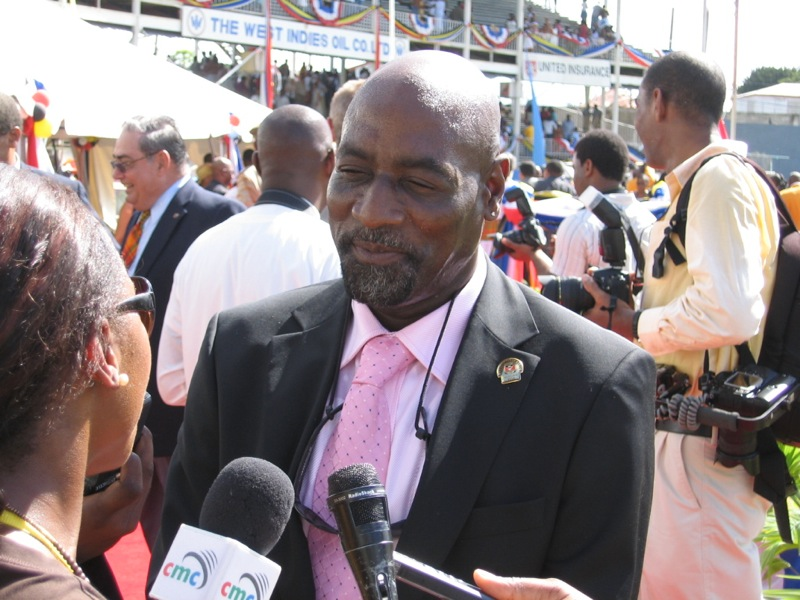
Viv Richards has scored 24 centuries in Test matches and 11 centuries in One Day Internationals.

Vivian Richards is a former international cricketer and captain of the West Indies cricket team. He has scored centuries (100 runs or more) in both Test and One Day International (ODI) matches. In 2000, he was knighted for his services to cricket, and during the same year named as one of five Wisden Cricketers of the Century. He is generally considered one of the greatest batsmen of all time, and in 2002 he was honoured by Wisden, who named him as the greatest ODI batsman of all time, and the third greatest Test batsman. After four years, he received the Most Exalted Order of National Hero award in his native Antigua.

Richards made his Test debut against India in November 1974, and scored his maiden Test century during the second Test of the same tour, scoring an unbeaten 192 in the first-innings of the match. In 1976, he scored seven Test centuries in a calendar year, passing Garfield Sobers' record of six, which had been set in 1958. (Note: Richards' record has since been equalled by Aravinda de Silva (1997) and Ricky Ponting (2006) and surpassed by Mohammad Yousuf (2006).) He scored his maiden double century in the first Test of that year's tour of England at Trent Bridge, Nottingham making 232. After scoring a century in the third Test, he once again scored a double century in the fifth Test, accumulating his highest score, 291, at The Oval, London. These centuries, and a total of 1,710 Test runs in the year, helped him to be named as one of the five Wisden Cricketers of the Year in 1977. In 1986, facing England at the Antigua Recreation Ground, Richards scored the fastest century in Test cricket, reaching his twentieth Test hundred in 56 balls. (Note: Although Richards' century was the fastest in terms of balls, it was only the fifth fastest in terms of time, 11 minutes slower than the 70-minute record held by Jack Gregory.) Richards has the fourth-highest number of centuries for the West Indies, behind Brian Lara's 34, Shivnarine Chanderpaul's 30 and Sobers' 26.

In One Day International cricket, Richards made his debut during the 1975 Cricket World Cup in England. He scored his first century the following year in the same country, during the first ODI match of the tour, remaining 119 not out. He holds the two highest scores by a West Indian batsman in ODI cricket, 181 against Sri Lanka in 1987 and 189 not out against England in 1984. His score of 189 not out was also the highest score by any ODI batsman for just under 13 years, until it was surpassed by Saeed Anwar's 194. (Note: Afer Anwar's 194, the record has been exceeded many times.) This innings was also named by Wisden as the best ODI innings of all time in a 2002 list. In total, seven of Richards' eleven centuries were in the top 100, and his 1979 unbeaten 138 against England at Lord's ranked second.

== Key ==
- * denotes that he remained not out.
- ‡ denotes that he was the captain of the West Indian team in that match.
- Pos. denotes his position in the batting order.
- Test denotes the number of the Test match played in that series.
- Inn. denotes the number of the innings in the match.
- H/A/N denotes whether the venue is home (West Indies), away (opposition's home) or neutral.
- Lost denotes that the match was lost by West Indies.
- Won denotes that the match was won by West Indies.
- BF denotes the number of balls faced by Richards in his innings.
- S/R denotes strike rate.

== Test cricket centuries ==
No.	Score	Against	Pos.	Inn.	Test	Venue	H/A	Date	Result
1	192*	India	5	2	2/5	Feroz Shah Kotla, Delhi	Away	11 December 1974	Won
2	101	Australia	2	4	5/6	Adelaide Oval, Adelaide	Away	23 January 1976	Lost
3	142	India	3	2	1/4	Kensington Oval, Bridgetown	Home	10 March 1976	Won
4	130	India	3	1	2/4	Queen's Park Oval, Port of Spain	Home	24 March 1976	Draw
5	177	India	3	1	3/4	Queen's Park Oval, Port of Spain	Home	7 April 1976	Lost
6	232	England	3	1	1/5	Trent Bridge, Nottingham	Away	3 June 1976	Draw
7	135	England	3	3	3/5	Old Trafford, Manchester	Away	8 July 1976	Won
8	291	England	3	1	5/5	The Oval, London	Away	12 August 1976	Won
9	140	Australia	3	2	1/2	Brisbane Cricket Ground, Brisbane	Away	1 December 1979	Draw
10	145	England	3	2	2/5	Lord's, London	Away	19 June 1980	Draw
11	120*	Pakistan	3	1	4/4	Ibn-e-Qasim Bagh Stadium, Multan	Away	30 December 1980	Draw
12	182*	England	4	3	3/5	Kensington Oval, Bridgetown	Home	13 March 1981	Won
13	114	England	3	2	4/5	Antigua Recreation Ground, St. John's	Home	27 March 1981	Draw
14	109	India	3	1	3/5	Bourda, Georgetown	Home	31 March 1983	Draw
15	120	India	4	2	4/6	Wankhede Stadium, Bombay	Away	24 November 1983	Draw
16	178	Australia	4	2	4/5	Antigua Recreation Ground, St. John's	Home	7 April 1984	Won
17	117	England	4	2	1/5	Edgbaston, Birmingham	Away	14 June 1984	Won
18	208	Australia	5	1	4/5	Melbourne Cricket Ground, Melbourne	Away	22 December 1984	Draw
19	105 ‡	New Zealand	6	2	3/4	Kensington Oval, Bridgetown	Home	26 April 1985	Won
20	110* ‡	England	3	3	5/5	Antigua Recreation Ground, St. John's	Home	11 April 1986	Won
21	109* ‡	India	5	4	1/4	Feroz Shah Kotla, Delhi	Away	25 November 1987	Won
22	123 ‡	Pakistan	5	3	2/3	Queen's Park Oval, Port of Spain	Home	14 April 1988	Draw
23	146 ‡	Australia	5	1	2/5	WACA Ground, Perth	Away	2 December 1988	Won
24	110 ‡	India	5	2	4/4	Sabina Park, Kingston	Home	28 April 1989	Won

== ODI centuries ==
No.	Score	Against	Pos.	Inn.	BF	S/R	Venue	H/A/N	Date	Result
1	119*	England	3	2	133	89.47	North Marine Road, Scarborough	Away	26 August 1976	Won
2	138*	England	3	1	157	87.89	Lord's, London	Away	23 June 1979	Won
3	153*	Australia	3	1	130	117.69	Melbourne Cricket Ground, Melbourne	Away	9 December 1979	Won
4	119	India	3	1	146	81.50	The Oval, London	Neutral	15 June 1983	Won
5	149	India	3	1	99	150.50	Keenan Stadium, Jamshedpur	Away	7 December 1983	Won
6	106	Australia	4	1	95	111.57	Melbourne Cricket Ground, Melbourne	Away	22 January 1984	Won
7	189*	England	4	1	170	111.17	Old Trafford, Manchester	Away	31 May 1984	Won
8	103*	Australia	4	2	122	84.42	Sydney Cricket Ground, Sydney	Away	15 January 1985	Won
9	119 ‡	New Zealand	5	1	113	105.30	Carisbrook, Dunedin	Away	18 March 1987	Won
10	181 ‡	Sri Lanka	4	1	125	144.80	National Stadium, Karachi	Neutral	13 October 1987	Won
11	110 ‡	India	4	2	77	142.85	Municipal Stadium, Rajkot	Away	5 January 1988	Won
