= Six Giants of the Wisden Century =

1963 list of great cricketers

The "Six Giants of the Wisden Century" are six cricketers who were judged by Sir Neville Cardus in 1963 to have been the most notable players of the previous 100 years. Cardus made his selection at the request of Wisden Cricketers' Almanack for its 100th annual edition published that year.

== Selection ==
In alphabetical order, the six players selected were:

- Sydney Barnes
- Don Bradman
- W. G. Grace
- Jack Hobbs
- Tom Richardson
- Victor Trumper

== Alternatives ==
Cardus was aware that any such selection would be controversial, for he wrote: "I can already hear in my imagination a thousand protesting voices (including my own)". He then named over a dozen other players that he had considered for the honour:

- Ranjitsinhji
- Fred Spofforth
- Wilfred Rhodes
- Johnny Tyldesley
- Charlie Macartney
- Aubrey Faulkner
- Bill O'Reilly
- Keith Miller
- Frank Woolley
- Ray Lindwall
- Len Hutton
- B. J. T. Bosanquet
- Bart King

Given that Cardus was making the choice, the omission of Rhodes is the biggest surprise. In another place, Cardus has written that he would "bend any rule to ensure that Wilfred is in my team".

Cardus explained that he had looked for more than brilliant batting and artful bowling. He wanted players who, in addition to scoring runs and taking wickets, "have given to the technique and style of cricket a new twist, a new direction". In other words, he wanted not just great players but creative players (Cardus used the italics himself).

== Rationale ==
His stated reasons for each of the six choices included the following comments:

W. G. Grace
None of these (other great players), not even Sir Jack (Hobbs), dominated for decades all other players, none of them lasted so long.
In a way he invented what we now call modern cricket. His national renown packed cricket grounds everywhere. He laid the foundations of county cricket economy. The sweep of his energy, his authority, and prowess, his personal presence, caused cricket to expand beyond a game. His bulk and stride carried cricket into the highways of our national life. He became a representative Victorian, a father figure.

Jack Hobbs
Sir Jack is the only cricketer of whom we might fairly say that he directly descended from W.G. fully-armed, like Jove.
I never saw him make an uneducated stroke. When he misjudged the nature of a ball he could, naturally enough, make the wrong right stroke. He not only enlarged and subtilised the art of batsmanship; he, like W.G. widened and strengthened cricket's appeal and history.
...the vintage Hobbs, the Master of our time...

Tom Richardson
I choose Richardson as one of my Six, not on the supposition that he was the greatest fast bowler of the century, though certainly he was in the running.
I take him as the fully realised personification of the fast bowler as every schoolboy dreams and hopes he might one day be himself. Richardson was, in his heyday, a handsome, swarthy giant, lithe, muscular, broad of shoulder, and of apparently inexhaustible energy.
He was indeed the ideal fast bowler, aiming at the stumps, always on the attack. His leap before the right arm wheeled over was superb in poise. Never did he send down a defensive ball. He would have been too proud.
"He tried," A.C. MacLaren told me, "to get a wicket every ball. Honest Tom!" Let us remember him by those two words of MacLaren's tribute – Honest Tom.

Victor Trumper
It is futile to ask who was the greatest batsman? There are different orders of greatness. Talent, even genius, is conditioned by the material circumstances in which it is developed.
Victor Trumper was the embodiment of gallantry as he made his runs. He was a chivalrous batsman, nothing mean or discourteous in any of his movements or intentions at the wicket. "He had no style", wrote C. B. Fry of him, "but he was all style".
But not by counting Victor's runs, not by looking at any records, will you get the slightest idea of Trumper's glorious cricket. You might as well count the notes of the music of Mozart.

Sydney Barnes
Most cricketers and students of the game belonging to the period in which S.F. Barnes played were agreed that he was the bowler of the century. Australians as well as English voted him unanimously the greatest.
Clem Hill, the famous Australian left-handed batsman, told me that on a perfect wicket Barnes could swing the new ball in and out very late, could spin from the ground, pitch on the leg stump and miss the off.
Barnes had a splendid upright action, right arm straight over. He ran on easy strides, not a penn'orth of energy wasted. He fingered a cricket ball sensitively, like a violinist his fiddle. He always attacked.

Don Bradman
Sir Donald Bradman (hereinafter to be named Bradman or The Don), must be called the most masterful and prolific maker of runs the game has so far known. He was, in short, a great batsman. Critics have argued that he was mechanical. So is a majestically flying aeroplane.
The difference between Bradman and, say, Victor Trumper as batsmen, was in fact the difference between an aeroplane and a swallow in flight.
Discussing him entirely from the point of view of a writer on the game, I am happy to say that he was for me a constant spur to ideas. A newspaper column couldn't contain him. He was, as far as a cricketer can be, a genius.

== See also ==
- Wisden Cricketers of the Year
- Wisden Cricketers of the Century
- Wisden Leading Cricketer in the World
