= Viv Richards =

Antiguan international cricketer (born 1952)

The Honourable Sir Viv Richards KNH KCN OBE OOC
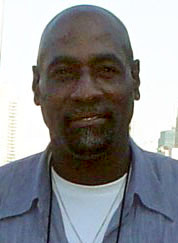
- Richards in 2005

Personal information
- Full name: Isaac Vivian Alexander Richards
- Born: 7 March 1952 (age 74); St. John's, British Leeward Islands
- Nickname: Master Blaster, Smokin Joe, King Viv
- Batting: Right-handed
- Bowling: Right-arm slow seam; Right-arm off-break
- Role: Batting all-rounder

International information
- National side: West Indies (1974–1991)
- Test debut (cap 151): 22 November 1974 v India
- Last Test: 8 August 1991 v England
- ODI debut (cap 14): 7 June 1975 v Sri Lanka
- Last ODI: 27 May 1991 v England

Domestic team information
- Years: Team
- 1971/72–1990/91: Leeward Islands
- 1971/72–1980/81: Combined Islands
- 1974–1986: Somerset
- 1976/77: Queensland
- 1990–1993: Glamorgan

Career statistics
Competition	Test	ODI	FC	LA
Matches	121	187	507	500
Runs scored	8,540	6,721	36,212	16,995
Batting average	50.23	47.00	49.40	41.96
100s/50s	24/45	11/45	114/162	26/109
Top score	291	189*	322	189*
Balls bowled	5,170	5,644	23,226	12,214
Wickets	32	118	223	290
Bowling average	61.37	35.83	45.15	30.59
5 wickets in innings	0	2	1	3
10 wickets in match	0	0	0	0
Best bowling	2/17	6/41	5/88	6/24
Catches/stumpings	122/–	100/–	464/1	238/–
Medal record
Men's Cricket
Representing West Indies
ICC Cricket World Cup
Winner	1975 England
Winner	1979 England
Runner-up	1983 England
- Source: CricInfo, 4 August 2025

Sir Isaac Vivian Alexander Richards KNH KCN OBE OOC (born 7 March 1952) is an Antiguan retired cricketer who represented the West Indies cricket team between 1974 and 1991. Usually batting at number three in a dominant West Indies team, Richards is widely regarded as one of the greatest batters of all time. Richards was part of the squads that won the 1975 Cricket World Cup and 1979 Cricket World Cup and finished as runners-up in the 1983 Cricket World Cup.

Richards made his Test debut in 1974 against India along with Gordon Greenidge. His best years were between 1976 and 1983, during which time he averaged a remarkable 66.51 with the bat in Test cricket. In 1984 he suffered from pterygium and had eye surgery which affected his eyesight and reflexes. Despite this, he remained one of the best batters in the world for the remaining four years of his career, though his average in the second half of his career was significantly lower than for the first. Richards scored 8,540 runs in 121 Test matches at an average of 50.23 and retired as the West Indies' leading run-scorer, overhauling the aggregate of Garfield Sobers. He also scored 1,281 runs at an average of over 55 in World Series Cricket, which is sometimes regarded as the highest and most difficult level of cricket ever played. As a captain, he won 27 of 50 Test matches and lost only 8. He also scored nearly 7,000 runs in One Day Internationals and more than 36,000 in first-class cricket.

He was knighted for his contributions to cricket in 1999. In 2000 he was voted one of Wisden's five Cricketers of the Century by a 100-member panel of experts, and in 2002 the almanack judged that he had played the best One Day International innings of all time. In December 2002, he was chosen by Wisden as the greatest One Day International batsman who had played to that date and as the third-greatest Test cricket batter. In 2009, Richards was inducted into the ICC Cricket Hall of Fame.

In October 2013, Wisden selected the best test team in 150 years of test history and included Richards at No. 5. He is one of only two batsman of the post-war era (the other being Sachin Tendulkar) to feature in that team.

== Early life ==
Richards was born to Malcolm and Gretel Richards in St. John's, Antigua, then part of the British Leeward Islands. He attended St. John's Boys Primary School and then Antigua Grammar Secondary School on a scholarship.

Richards discovered cricket at a young age. His brothers, Mervyn and Donald, both played the game, representing Antigua as amateurs, and they encouraged him to play. The young Richards initially practiced with his father and Pat Evanson, a neighbor and family friend, who had captained the Antigua team.

Richards left school aged 18, and worked at D'Arcy's Bar and Restaurant in St. John's. He joined St. John's Cricket Club and the owner of the restaurant where he worked, D'Arcy Williams, provided him with new whites, gloves, pads and a bat. After a few seasons with St. John's C.C., he joined Rising Sun Cricket Club, where he remained until his departure to play abroad.

Richards was suspended from playing cricket for two years when he was a 17-year-old in 1969. Playing for Antigua against St Kitts, he got out for a golden duck much to the disgust of himself and the 6,000 supporters. Some supporters occupied the pitch, and the game was held up for two hours. Richards was then given a second opportunity to bat in an effort to appease the supporters, who were almost rioting. In his second bat in the innings, he was again out for a duck. Richards said of the incident:

"I behaved very badly and I am not proud of it. But those in authority, who were advising me, didn't do themselves very proud either. I was told to restore peace I should go back out to bat. I did not want to and was not very happy about it. Had I been a more experienced player then I think I would have refused. But go back I did. I was made to look a fool for the convenience of the local cricket authorities."

== Cricket career ==
Richards made his first-class debut in January 1972 when he was 19. He took part in a non-competition match, representing the Leeward Islands against the Windwards: Richards made 20 and 26. His competitive debut followed a few days later. Playing in the domestic West Indian Shell Shield for the Combined Leeward and Windward Islands in Kingston, Jamaica versus Jamaica, he scored 15 and 32, top-scoring in the second innings in a heavy defeat for his team.

By the time Richards was 22, he had played matches in the Antigua, Leeward Islands and Combined Islands tournaments. In 1973, his abilities were noticed by Len Creed, Vice Chairman at Somerset, who was in Antigua at the time as part of a West Country touring team. Lester Bird and Danny Livingstone played an important part in persuading Creed to take Richards to Somerset. Surrey had earlier rejected both Richards and Andy Roberts at the Surrey Indoor Nets in late 1972. "They did not think we were good enough even to further our cricket education."

=== Move to England, 1973–1974 ===
During 1973–74, Richards relocated to the United Kingdom, where Creed arranged for him to play league cricket for Lansdown C.C. in Bath. He made his Lansdown debut, as part of the second XI, at Weston-super-Mare on 26 April 1973. Richards was also employed by the club as assistant groundsman to head groundsman John Heyward, which allowed him some financial independence until his career was established. After his debut he was promoted to the first team where he was introduced to the Lansdown all-rounder "Shandy" Perera from Ceylon (now Sri Lanka). Richards cites Perera as a major influence on his cricket development especially with regards to post-game analysis. He finished his first season at Lansdown top of the batting averages and shortly afterwards was offered a two-year contract with county team Somerset.

Richards then moved to Taunton in 1974 in preparation for his professional debut with Somerset CCC where he was assigned living accommodation by the club; a flat-share with two other county players: Ian Botham and Dennis Breakwell. On 27 April 1974 Richards made his Benson & Hedges Cup debut for Somerset against Glamorgan in Swansea; after the game Somerset skipper Brian Close arranged a player's ovation for Richards in recognition of his playing and contribution to the victory. Richards was awarded Man of the Match.

=== Test debut to international stardom, 1975–1984 ===
Richards made his Test match debut for the West Indian cricket team in 1974 against India in Bangalore. He made an unbeaten 192 in the second Test of the same series in New Delhi. The West Indies saw him as a strong opener and he kept his profile up in the early years of his promising career.

In 1975, Richards helped the West Indies win the inaugural Cricket World Cup against Australia, a feat he later described as the most memorable of his career. He starred in the field, running out Alan Turner, Ian Chappell and Greg Chappell. The West Indies were again able to win the following World Cup in 1979, thanks to a Richards century in the final at Lord's. Richards believes that on both occasions, despite internal island divisions, the Caribbean came together.

1976 was perhaps Richards's finest year: he scored 1710 runs, at an astonishing average of 90.00, with seven centuries in 11 Tests. This achievement is all the more remarkable considering he missed the second Test at Lord's after contracting glandular fever; yet he returned to score his career-best 291 at the Oval later in the summer. This tally stood as the world record for most Test runs by a batsman in a single calendar year for 30 years until broken by Mohammad Yousuf of Pakistan on 30 November 2006.

Richards had a long and successful career in the County Championship in England, playing for many years for Somerset. In 1983, the team won the NatWest Trophy, with Richards and close friend Ian Botham having a playful slugging match in the final few overs. Richards also starred in Somerset's victories in the finals of the 1979 Gillette Cup, and the 1981 Benson & Hedges Cup, making a century in both finals, also helping Somerset to win the 1979 John Player League and the 1982 Benson & Hedges Cup.

Richards refused a "blank-cheque" offer to play for a rebel West Indies squad in South Africa during the Apartheid era in 1983, and again in 1984.

=== West Indies captain and domestic cricket, 1984–1991 ===
Richards captained the West Indies in 50 Test matches from 1984 to 1991. He is the only West Indies captain never to lose a Test series, and it is said that his fierce will to win contributed to this achievement. His captaincy was, however, not without controversy: one incident was his aggressive, "finger-flapping" appeal leading to the incorrect dismissal of England batsman Rob Bailey in the Barbados Test in 1990, which was described by Wisden as "at best undignified and unsightly. At worst, it was calculated gamesmanship". This behaviour would nowadays be penalised according to Section 2.5. of the Rules of Conduct of the ICC Code of Conduct. During a match against Zimbabwe during the 1983 Cricket World Cup, Richards returned to the crease after a stoppage for bad light and accidentally took strike at the wrong end, which remains a very rare occurrence.

Richards continued to thrive in international cricket. He became the only man to score a century and take 5 wickets in the same one-day international when he played against New Zealand at Dunedin in 1986–87 - a feat that wasn't broken until 2005. Moreover, in 1984, he rescued his team from a perilous position of 166/9 at Old Trafford in a partnership with Michael Holding for the 10th and final wicket, smashing 189 leading West Indies to a total of 272/9 and winning the game off his own bat. This is widely regarded as one of the greatest ODI innings of all time.

For his domestic appearances, Richards had joined Somerset in 1974. There, he made his highest first-class score, 322, when they played Warwickshire in 1985. However, despite his totemic presence at Somerset, over time his performances declined as he devoted most of his time to international cricket. The county finished bottom of the County Championship in 1985, and next to bottom in 1986. In 1988, the county was surrounded by controversy when Somerset's new captain Peter Roebuck became an instrumental piece in the decision not to renew the contracts of Richards and his West Indies teammate Joel Garner, whose runs and wickets had brought the county much success in the previous eight years. Somerset proposed to replace the pair with New Zealand batsman Martin Crowe. Consequently, Ian Botham refused a new contract with Somerset in protest at the way his friends Richards and Garner had been treated and promptly joined Worcestershire. After many years of bitterness over the event and the eventual removal of Roebuck from the club, Richards was eventually honoured with the naming of a set of entrance gates after him at the County Ground, Taunton.

In November 1988, while on tour of Australia with the West Indies, Richards became the first West Indies player to reach 100 first-class centuries by scoring 101 against New South Wales. Richards remains the only West Indies player to achieve this milestone, and among non-England qualified players only Don Bradman (117) scored more first-class centuries than Richards's 114.

Richards returned to county cricket for the 1990 season towards the end of his career to play for Glamorgan, helping them to win the AXA Sunday League in 1993.

== After cricket ==
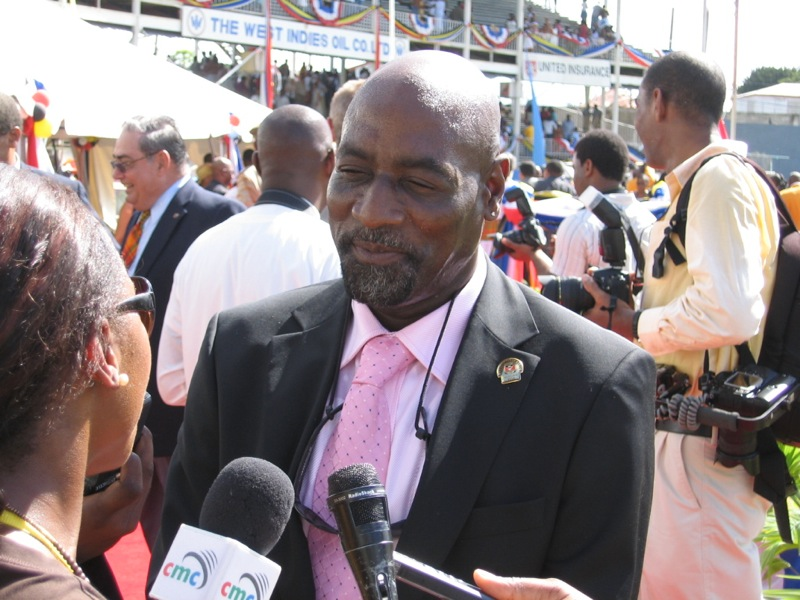
Richards being interviewed after a cricket match in 2006

Richards is a commentator on BBC's Test Match Special (TMS). He participated in Prince Edward of the United Kingdom's 1987 charity television special The Grand Knockout Tournament. He was featured in the 2010 documentary movie Fire in Babylon and spoke about his experiences playing for the West Indies. Richards joined the Delhi Daredevils as their mentor in The Indian Premier League in 2013, and also mentored the Quetta Gladiators in the 2016, 2017, 2018, 2019, 2020, and 2022 Pakistan Super League.

== Personality and playing style ==
Richards was described by BBC Sport as "quiet and self-contained away from the pitch", while noting that he was "possibly the most destructive batsman the sport has ever seen". A right-handed batsman, he was known for his aggressive batting style. He was also an accomplished fielder and a capable off-spin and slow-seam bowler. Richards has been widely regarded by cricketers, journalists, and commentators as one of the greatest and most dominant batsmen in cricket history. He played his entire 17-year career without a helmet.

His fearless and aggressive style of play, and relaxed but determined demeanor made him a crowd favourite and a challenging opponent for bowlers. The word "swagger" is frequently used to describe his batting style. His batting often dominated opposing bowlers. He had the ability to drive good-length balls from outside off-stump through midwicket, his trademark shot, and was one of the great exponents of the hook shot.

Richards was notorious for punishing bowlers that dared to sledge him, so much so, that many opposing captains banned their players from the practice. However, when playing for Somerset in a county game against Glamorgan, Greg Thomas attempted to sledge Richards after he had played and missed at several balls in a row. He sarcastically informed Richards: "It's red, round and it's about five ounces, in case you were wondering." Richards then hammered the next delivery for 6, straight out of the stadium and into a nearby river. Turning back to the bowler, he commented: "You know what it looks like, now go and find it."

== Autobiographies ==
Richards, with David Foot, wrote an autobiography titled Viv Richards, in 1979.

In 1991, Richards published a second autobiography entitled Hitting Across the Line. In the book, Richards describes how his whole life revolved around sports, cricket in particular. Of special interest is his technique, expressed by the title of the book. To hit across the line of the ball is considered taboo, and dangerously risky. However, Richards's explanation of the conditions in which he played cricket in Antigua as a child, explains how this technique came to be.

== Achievements ==
=== Statistical summary ===
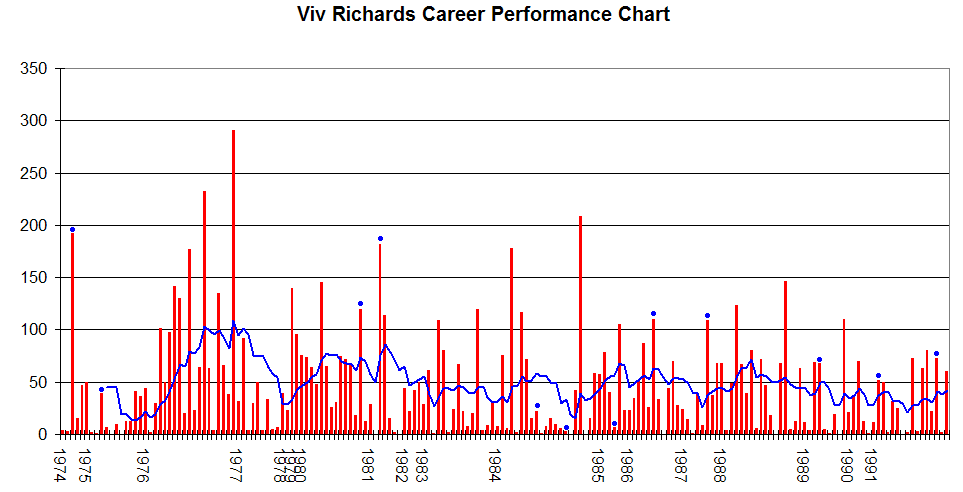
Richards's Test career batting chart

In his Test career, Richards scored 8,540 runs in 121 Test matches at an average of 50.23 (including 24 centuries). He also scored 5 centuries in World Series Cricket between 1977 and 1979. These are not recognised by the ICC as "official" Test centuries. Richards won 27 of 50 matches as a Test captain, and lost only 8. He is also the scorer of the equal second fastest-ever Test century, from just 56 balls against England in Antigua during the 1986 tour. He hit 84 sixes in Test cricket. His highest innings of 291 is equal seventh (along with Ramnaresh Sarwan) on the list of West Indies' highest individual scores.

In ODIs, Richards scored 6721 runs in 187 matches at an average of 47 and strike rate of 90.20, including 11 centuries and 45 fifties. He was well ahead of his era in ODIs. For reference, during the period in which he played one-day internationals (from his first game to the last), the batting average in ODIs for the top seven batsmen was 29.38, while the average strike rate was a mere 65.96.

==== International records ====
- In 1986, Richards became the first batsman to score a Test century at a strike rate of over 150.
- Richards scored the fastest century in Test history (56 balls) in 1986, being sole record holder until his feat was first equalled by Misbah-ul-Haq in 2014 and then eclipsed by Brendon McCullum's 54-ball ton in 2016.
- Richards set a record for being the fastest batsman to 1,000 ODI runs (21 innings); this record has subsequently been equalled by Kevin Pietersen, Babar Azam, Jonathan Trott, and Quinton de Kock.
- Along with Michael Holding, Richards holds the record for the highest ever 10th-wicket partnership in ODI history.(106*)
- He also holds the record for the highest individual ODI score when batting at number 4 position (189*)
- He became the first player to score a fifty and to take a five-wicket haul in the same ODI. He also became the first cricketer to score a century as well as to take a five-wicket haul in the same ODI match.
- Richards was the first player to complete the double of scoring 1000 runs and taking 50 wickets in ODI history.

=== Honours ===
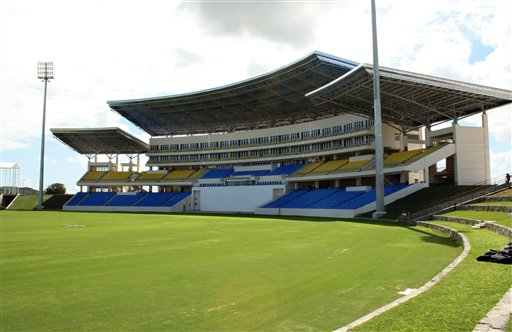
The Sir Vivian Richards Stadium in 2012

In 1994, Richards was appointed an Officer of the Order of the British Empire (OBE) for services to cricket. In 1999, he was made a Knight Commander of the Order of the Nation (KCN) by his native country Antigua and Barbuda. In 2006, he was upgraded to Antigua and Barbuda highest award, Knight of the Order of the National Hero (KNH).

The Sir Vivian Richards Stadium in North Sound, Antigua, is named in his honour. It was built for use in the 2007 Cricket World Cup. The ground has hosted three Test matches, as well as a number of One-Day Internationals and T20 Internationals.

The Richards–Botham Trophy, replacing the Wisden Trophy for winners of West Indies–England Test series, is named in honour of Richards and Lord Ian Botham.

In 2022, during the opening ceremony of the forty-third regular meeting of the Conference of Heads of Government of CARICOM, Richards was awarded the Order of the Caribbean Community (OOC), the highest honour that can be conferred upon a Caribbean national. The award confers the styling "The Honourable" as well.

== Legacy and place in cricket history ==
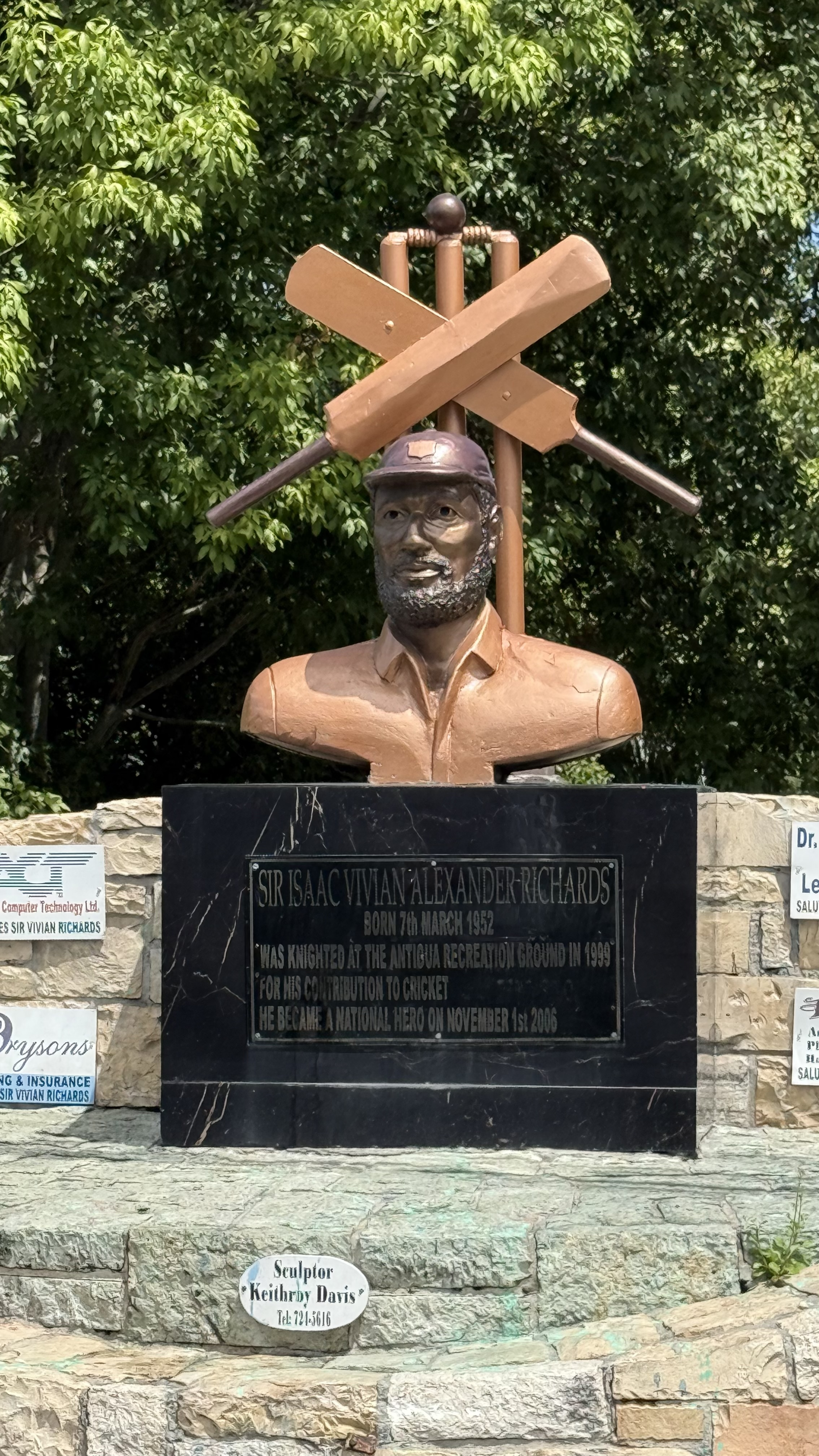
A bust of Richards in St. John's, Antigua and Barbuda

In 2000, Richards was named one of the five Wisden Cricketers of the Century, coming fifth behind Sir Donald Bradman, Sir Garfield Sobers, Sir Jack Hobbs and Shane Warne in the poll of 100 international cricket experts appointed by Wisden Cricketers' Almanack.

Several prominent personalities including former cricketer Imran Khan and writer John Birmingham are of the opinion that Richards was the best ever batsman against genuine fast bowling. For Barry Richards, Ravi Shastri and Neil Fairbrother, he has been cited as the best batsman they personally witnessed. Wasim Akram rates Richards as the greatest batsman he ever bowled to, ahead of Sunil Gavaskar and Martin Crowe.

Akram also rates Richards as the best and most complete batsman he ever saw ahead of Sachin Tendulkar and Brian Lara. Crowe himself rated Richards as the best batsman he played against, along with Greg Chappell. Muttiah Muralitharan and Shane Warne, arguably the two greatest spinners of all time, both idolize Richards. Murali idolized Richards in his years growing up, while Warne rates him the greatest batsman "for me", and overall just after Bradman.

If you talk about a batsman with an unmatched technique, charisma and someone who had a huge impact on the game, it is Sir Vivian Richards. I have played against all the greats from mid-eighties to the nineties to the 2000s, but Viv Richards was a class apart.

— Wasim Akram on Viv Richards

Ian Botham, who is regarded as one of the greatest all-rounders of all time and one of England's greatest cricketers, rates Richards as the greatest batsman he ever saw ahead of Sunil Gavaskar, Greg Chappell, Martin Crowe, Sachin Tendulkar and Brian Lara. Michael Holding, often regarded as one of the greatest fast bowlers of all time and part of the West Indies four-prolonged pace attack during the late 1970s and early 1980s rates Richards as the greatest batsman he witnessed in the last 50 years. England's fast bowling great Bob Willis rated Richards as greatest batsman he ever witnessed and best he ever bowled to.

At number 3:- Viv Richards; I never saw Donald Bradman play but if he was better player than Viv then he must have been some player.

— Bob Willis on Viv Richards

Australian fast bowling greats Jeff Thomson (often regarded as the fastest bowler in cricket history) and Dennis Lillee rate Richards as the best batsman they ever bowled against. Lillee also termed him "the supreme player". Thomson also rates Richards as the greatest batsman he bowled against. Former Australian captain Ian Chappell, who is regarded as one of the best cricket captains of all time, rates Richards as the most intimidating and dangerous batsman he ever saw, who often changed games simply by walking to the crease.

For sheer ability to rip an attack apart with animal like brutality and still maintaining better consistency then all others around. I have to pick Viv on top of the list. I just love bowling to the man because it was such a challenge. I regard him as the supreme player. I think we finished about level- I got him as often as he got me.

— Dennis Lillee on Viv Richards in his autobiography Menance

Brian Lara and Sachin Tendulkar who are regarded as two of the greatest modern day batsman rates Richards as the best they ever saw and their batting idol while growing up. Kumar Sangakara, former Sri Lankan Wicket keeper batsman often rates Richards along with Lara as the greatest batsman he ever witnessed and further calls Richards as his cricketing idol while growing up. Former Pakistan captain Inzamam-ul-haq rates Richards as the greatest batsman he ever saw ahead of both Tendulkar and Lara.

The International Cricket Council (ICC) has produced rankings for batters and bowlers for both the longer and shorter versions. In the ratings for Test Cricket, Richards holds the equal-seventh-highest peak rating (938), after Sir Donald Bradman (961), Steve Smith (947), Sir Len Hutton, Sir Jack Hobbs, Ricky Ponting and Peter May. The One Day International (ODI) ratings place Richards first, followed by Zaheer Abbas and Greg Chappell. He topped the rankings at the end of the years 1976, 1977, 1980, 1981, 1982, 1983 and 1986.

He was voted the greatest cricketer since 1970 in a poll, ahead of Ian Botham and Shane Warne. That poll saw both Botham and Warne vote for Richards, and in the opinions of both, Richards is the greatest batsman they ever saw. In 2006, in a study done by a team of ESPN's Cricinfo magazine, Richards was again chosen as the greatest ODI Batsman ever.

To mark 150 years of the Cricketers' Almanack, Wisden named him in an all-time Test World XI.

== Football ==
Some writers contend that Richards also played international football for Antigua and Barbuda, appearing in qualifying matches for the 1974 World Cup. However, he does not appear in recorded line-ups for these matches.

== Personal life ==
Richards and his wife Miriam have two children, including Mali, who has also played first-class cricket. Richards is also godfather to Ian Botham's son, Liam.

Richards had a brief relationship with Indian actress Neena Gupta, with whom he has a daughter, fashion designer Masaba Gupta. Richards abandoned his daughter Masaba till she was 20, and Neena brought her up as a single mother.

== See also ==
- List of international cricket centuries by Viv Richards

== Sources ==
- Martin-Jenkins, C. (1983) The Cricketer Book of Cricket Disasters and Bizarre Records, Century Publishing: London. ISBN 0-7126-0191-0.
- McDonald, Trevor (1984). Viv Richards: The Authorised Biography. Sphere. ISBN 0722157274.
- Richards, Viv; Foot, David (1982). Viv Richards (autobiography). Star. ISBN 0352312084.

Preceded by Deryck Murray	West Indies Test cricket captains 1980–1990	Succeeded by Desmond Haynes
Preceded by Desmond Haynes	West Indies Test cricket captains 1991	Succeeded by Richie Richardson
