= Wisden Cricketers of the Century =

Top five 20th-century players of the bat-and-ball sport, according to Wisden Almanack

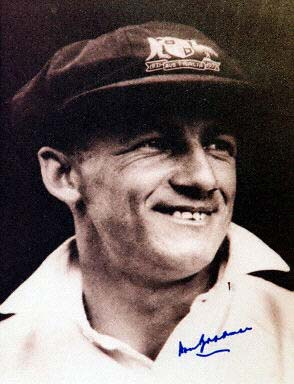
Many of the panel complained that two of their five votes would be wasted, as they would almost certainly be cast for Don Bradman (pictured) and Sobers

The Wisden Cricketers of the Century are five cricketers who were judged to be the most prominent players of the 20th century, as selected by a 100-member panel of cricket experts appointed by Wisden Cricketers' Almanack in 2000. The 97 men and three women on the panel were each given five votes with which to select the list. In order of votes, the five Wisden Cricketers of the Century are:

Position	Name	Votes
1.	Donald Bradman	100
2.	Garfield Sobers	90
3.	Jack Hobbs	30
4.	Shane Warne	27
5.	Viv Richards	25

Many of the panel complained that two of their five votes would be wasted, as they would almost certainly be cast for Bradman and Sobers. The editor of Wisden at the time, Matthew Engel, wrote that the only real deficiency of the list was the absence of a fast bowler in the top five places. Fast bowlers dominated cricket from the 1970s until at least the mid-1990s, and the most famous pre-war test series, Bodyline, aroused controversy because of England's fast bowling strategy designed to counter Bradman. The highest-placed fast bowler was Australia's Dennis Lillee, who finished joint sixth with Sir Frank Worrell, with 19 votes. The only specialist bowler in the top five was Shane Warne, who was a leg spinner. Warne was the only one of the five still playing when the list was published. Four members of the list received knighthoods and Warne is honoured as an officer of Order of Australia.

== See also ==
- Six Giants of the Wisden Century
- Wisden Cricketers of the Year
