= List of Pakistan cricket lists =

This is a list of Pakistan Cricket lists, an article with a collection of lists relating to the Pakistan Cricket team.

== Player statistics ==
=== Batting ===
- List of international cricket centuries by Mohammad Yousuf
- List of international cricket centuries by Younis Khan
- List of international cricket centuries by Inzamam-ul-Haq
- List of international cricket centuries by Saeed Anwar
- List of international cricket centuries by Javed Miandad

=== Bowling ===
- List of international cricket five-wicket hauls by Waqar Younis
- List of international cricket five-wicket hauls by Wasim Akram
- List of international cricket five-wicket hauls by Imran Khan
- List of international cricket five-wicket hauls by Saqlain Mushtaq
- List of international cricket five-wicket hauls by Abdul Qadir
- List of international cricket five-wicket hauls by Shoaib Akhtar
- List of international cricket five-wicket hauls by Danish Kaneria

== Records ==
=== Test ===
- List of Pakistan Test cricket records
- List of Pakistan cricketers who have taken five-wicket hauls on Test debut

=== One-day International ===
- List of Pakistan One Day International cricket records

=== Twenty20 ===
- List of Pakistan Twenty20 International cricket records

=== By ground ===
- List of international cricket centuries at Gaddafi Stadium
- List of international cricket centuries at the National Stadium
