= Jayasekera =

Jayasekera is a surname. Notable people with the surname include:

- D. S. Jayasekera (fl. 1947–1995), Sri Lankan teacher
- Kingsley Jayasekera (1924–2004), Sri Lankan actor
- Lakkana Jayasekera (born 1996), Sri Lankan cricketer
- Michael Jayasekera (fl. 1975), Sri Lankan rugby union player
- Nicholas Jayasekera (fl. 2013), Sri Lankan rear admiral
- Rohan Jayasekera (cricketer) (born 1957), Sri Lankan cricketer
- Rohan Jayasekera (writer) (born 1961), English freelance journalist
- Shantha Jayasekera (born 1963), Sri Lankan cricketer
- Thushari Jayasekera (born 1984), Sri Lankan-American actress
