= List of international cricket five-wicket hauls by Imran Khan =

Imran Khan, a retired Pakistani cricketer and former Prime Minister of Pakistan, took 24 five-wicket hauls during his career in international cricket. In cricket, a five-wicket haul (also known as a "five–for" or "fifer") refers to a bowler taking five or more wickets in a single innings. This is regarded as a notable achievement, and as of October 2024, only 54 bowlers have taken 15 or more five-wicket hauls at international level in their cricketing careers. A right-arm fast bowler who represented his country between 1971 and 1992, Khan was described by the BBC as "one of the finest fast bowlers cricket has ever seen", while Cricinfo declared him as "the greatest cricketer to emerge from Pakistan, and arguably the world's second-best allrounder after Garry Sobers". In 1983 he was named as one of the five Cricketers of the Year by the Wisden Cricketers' Almanack, and was inducted into the ICC Cricket Hall of Fame in January 2009.

Khan made his Test debut in 1971 against England at Edgbaston Cricket Ground. His first Test five-wicket haul came in 1977 against Australia in a match at Melbourne Cricket Ground which Pakistan lost. In the same year, he took his first pair of five-wicket hauls in a single match against Australia at the Sydney Cricket Ground. By the end of his career, he had claimed five-wickets hauls in both innings of a match on three occasions. His career-best figures for an innings were 8 wickets for 58 runs against Sri Lanka at Gaddafi Stadium, in March 1982. He took ten or more wickets in a match on six occasions.

Having made his One Day International (ODI) debut in August 1974 against England at Trent Bridge, Nottingham, Khan's solitary ODI five-wicket haul came in 1985 against India in a match at the Sharjah Cricket Association Stadium which Pakistan lost. He took 6 wickets for 14 runs in the match, which was his career-best bowling in ODI cricket. By the time he retired from international cricket in 1992 after nearly 21 years, Khan had taken 23 five-wicket hauls in Test cricket and one in ODIs. As of 2017, he is fifteenth overall among all-time combined five-wicket haul takers, a position which he shares with Sydney Barnes, Kapil Dev and Dennis Lillee. (Note: He is third in the equivalent list for Pakistan.)

== Key ==
Symbol	Meaning
Date	Date the match was held, or starting date of the match for Test matches
Overs	Number of overs bowled in that innings
Runs	Runs conceded
Wkts	Number of wickets taken
Batsmen	The batsmen whose wickets were taken in the five-wicket haul
Econ	Bowling economy rate (average runs per over)
Inn	The innings of the match in which the five-wicket haul was taken
Result	The result for the Pakistan team in that match
†	Khan selected as "Man of the match"
‡	10 wickets or more taken in the match
*	One of two five-wicket hauls by Khan in a match

== Tests ==
Five-wicket hauls in Test cricket
No.	Date	Ground	Against	Inn	Overs	Runs	Wkts	Econ	Batsmen	Result
1	1 January 1977	Melbourne Cricket Ground	Australia	3	25.5 (Note: Eight-ball overs were bowled in this match.)	122	5	3.57	Alan Turner; Greg Chappell; Doug Walters; Gary Cosier; Dennis Lillee	Lost
2	14 January 1977*‡	Sydney Cricket Ground	Australia	1	26	102	6	2.94	Rick McCosker; Greg Chappell; Doug Walters; Gary Cosier; Rod Marsh; Gary Gilmour	Won
3	14 January 1977*‡	Sydney Cricket Ground	Australia	3	19.7	63	6	2.37	Ian Davis; Rick McCosker; Doug Walters; Gary Gilmour; Kerry O'Keeffe; Dennis Lillee	Won
4	15 April 1977	Sabina Park, Kingston	West Indies	1	18	90	6	5.00	Roy Fredericks; Viv Richards; Clive Lloyd; Alvin Kallicharran; Deryck Murray; David Holford	Lost
5	16 February 1979	McLean Park, Napier	New Zealand	2	33	106	5	2.40	Bruce Edgar; Mark Burgess; Stephen Boock; Warren Lees; Richard Hadlee	Drawn
6	15 January 1980	Madras Cricket Club Ground, Chennai	India	2	38.2	114	5	2.97	Sunil Gavaskar; Dilip Vengsarkar; Syed Kirmani; Kapil Dev; Dilip Doshi	Lost
7	29 January 1980	Eden Gardens, Kolkata	India	3	23.5	63	5	2.64	Roger Binny; Syed Kirmani; Gundappa Viswanath; Sunil Gavaskar; Dilip Doshi	Drawn
8	30 December 1980	Ibn-e-Qasim Bagh Stadium, Multan	West Indies	1	22	62	5	2.81	Desmond Haynes; Faoud Bacchus; Alvin Kallicharran; David Murray; Joel Garner	Drawn
9	22 March 1982*‡	Gaddafi Stadium, Lahore	Sri Lanka	1	29.3	58	8	1.96	Bandula Warnapura; Sidath Wettimuny; Rohan Jayasekera; Roy Dias; Ranjan Madugalle; Somachandra de Silva; Mahes Goonatilleke; Roger Wijesuriya	Won
10	22 March 1982*‡	Gaddafi Stadium, Lahore	Sri Lanka	3	22.5	58	6	2.54	Sidath Wettimuny; Rohan Jayasekera; Ashantha de Mel; Mahes Goonatilleke; Ravi Ratnayeke; Roger Wijesuriya	Won
11	29 July 1982 †	Edgbaston Cricket Ground, Birmingham	England	1	25.3	52	7	2.03	Derek Randall; David Gower; Ian Botham; Geoff Miller; Ian Greig; Eddie Hemmings; Bob Taylor	Lost
12	26 August 1982 †	Headingley, Leeds	England	2	25.2	49	5	1.93	Chris Tavaré; Mike Gatting; Allan Lamb; Bob Taylor; Robin Jackman	Lost
13	23 December 1982 ‡†	National Stadium, Karachi	India	4	20.1	60	8	2.97	Sunil Gavaskar; Dilip Vengsarkar; Gundappa Viswanath; Mohinder Amarnath; Sandeep Patil; Kapil Dev; Maninder Singh; Dilip Doshi	Won
14	3 January 1983*‡†	Iqbal Stadium, Faisalabad	India	1	25	98	6	3.92	Sunil Gavaskar; Dilip Vengsarkar; Sandeep Patil; Syed Kirmani; Kapil Dev; Madan Lal	Won
15	3 January 1983*‡†	Iqbal Stadium, Faisalabad	India	3	30.5	82	5	2.65	Dilip Vengsarkar; Mohinder Amarnath; Sandeep Patil; Maninder Singh; Dilip Doshi	Won
16	14 January 1983	Niaz Stadium, Hyderabad	India	2	17.2	35	6	2.01	Sunil Gavaskar; Gundappa Viswanath; Dilip Vengsarkar; Kapil Dev; Syed Kirmani; Dilip Doshi	Won
17	27 October 1985	Jinnah Stadium, Sialkot	Sri Lanka	3	18.3	40	5	2.16	Sidath Wettimuny; Arjuna Ranatunga; Ashantha de Mel; Rumesh Ratnayake; Roger Wijesuriya	Won
18	20 November 1986	Gaddafi Stadium, Lahore	West Indies	2	30.5	59	5	1.91	Larry Gomes; Jeff Dujon; Clyde Butts; Tony Gray; Courtney Walsh	Lost
19	7 November 1986	National Stadium, Karachi	West Indies	3	22.3	46	6	2.04	Viv Richards; Roger Harper; Malcolm Marshall; Clyde Butts; Tony Gray; Courtney Walsh	Drawn
20	4 July 1987 ‡†	Headingley, Leeds	England	3	19.1	40	7	2.08	Chris Broad; Tim Robinson; Bill Athey; David Gower; David Capel; Jack Richards; Graham Dilley	Won
21	23 July 1987	Edgbaston Cricket Ground, Birmingham	England	2	41.5	129	6	3.08	Chris Broad; Bill Athey; David Gower; Mike Gatting; Bruce French; Graham Dilley	Drawn
22	2 April 1988 ‡†	Bourda, Georgetown	West Indies	1	22.4	80	7	3.52	Desmond Haynes; Richie Richardson; Carl Hooper; Jeff Dujon; Winston Benjamin; Courtney Walsh; Patrick Patterson	Won
23	17 April 1988	Queen's Park Oval, Port of Spain	West Indies	3	45	115	5	2.55	Gordon Greenidge; Desmond Haynes; Richie Richardson; Gus Logie; Carl Hooper	Drawn

== One Day Internationals ==
Five-wicket haul in ODI cricket
No.	Date	Ground	Against	Inn	Overs	Runs	Wkts	Econ	Batsmen	Result
1	22 March 1985 †	Sharjah Cricket Association Stadium	India	1	10	14	6	1.40	Ravi Shastri; Kris Srikkanth; Dilip Vengsarkar; Sunil Gavaskar; Mohinder Amarnath; Madan Lal	Lost
