= Nicholas Jayasekera =

Surgeon Rear Admiral(Retired) Nicholas E. L. W. Jayasekera was the Director-General of the Health Services of Sri Lanka Navy. Before he retires from the service, he served as the Chief Executive Officer at the General Sir John Kotelawala Defence University Hospital.
