= List of international cricket centuries by Younis Khan =

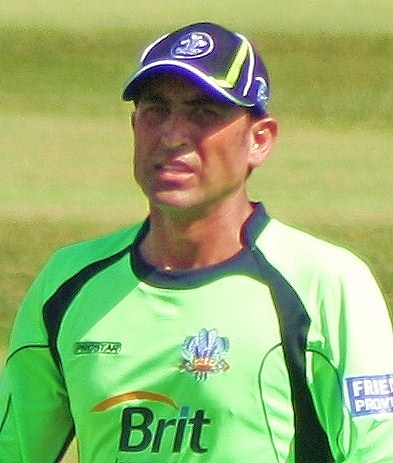
Younis Khan has scored 41 centuries for Pakistan.

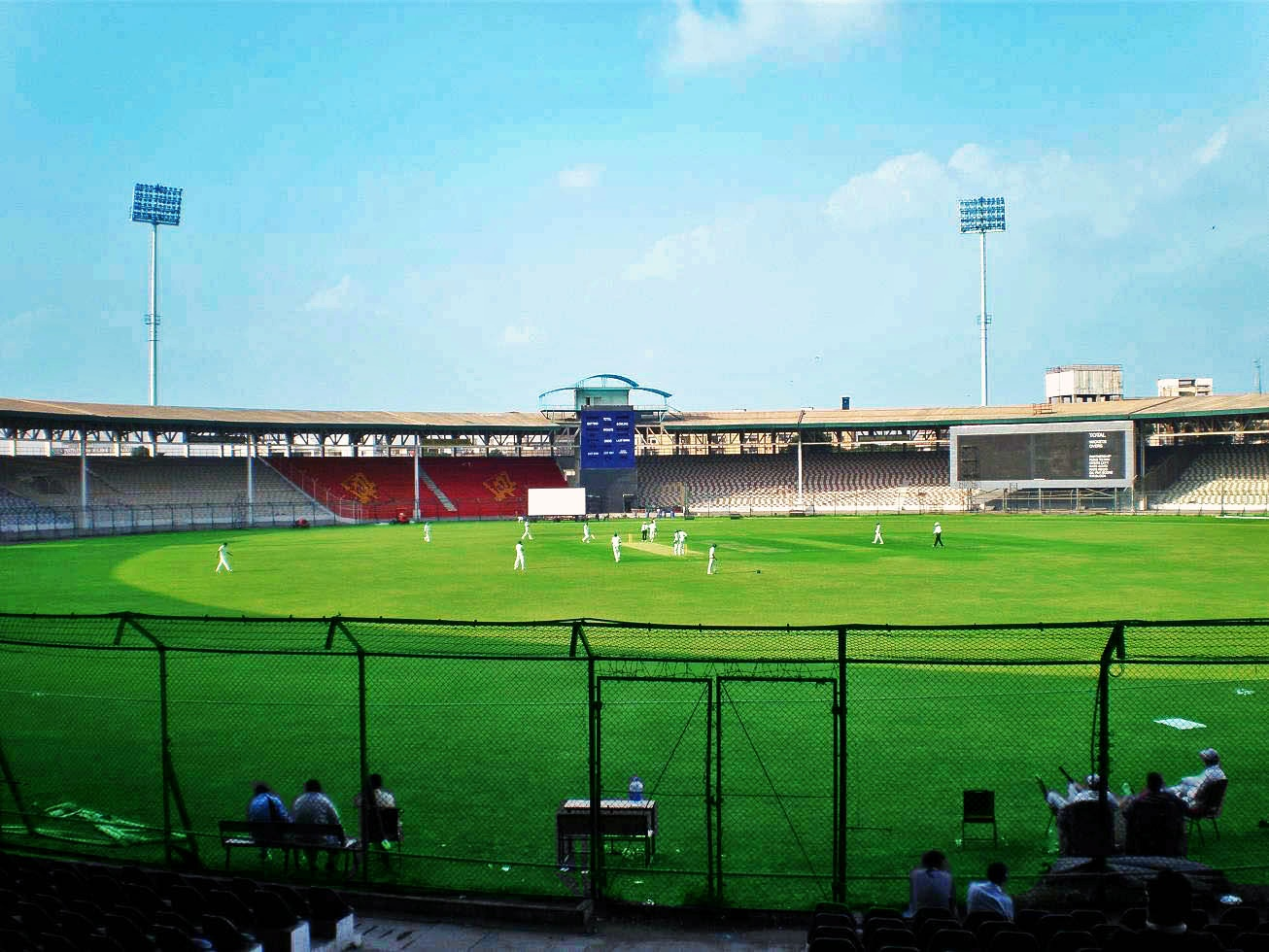
Khan made his International debut at the National Stadium, Karachi, in 2000, and made a triple-century there in 2009.

Younis Khan (also spelled as Younus Khan) is a Pakistani cricketer and former captain of the Pakistan national cricket team. He has scored centuries (100 or more runs in a single innings) in Test and One Day International (ODI) matches on thirty-four and seven occasions respectively. He has played 115 Test and 265 ODI matches for Pakistan, scoring 10000+ and 7,249 runs respectively. He was described by the BBC as "a dependable member of the strong Pakistan middle order" and the "most graceful batsman in the side". Former Australian captain Michael Clarke said about him that he was "one of the gentlemen of our game, class player" and "a very good player".

Khan scored a century on his Test debut against Sri Lanka at the Rawalpindi Cricket Stadium in 2000, and became the seventh Pakistan player to achieve this feat. (Note: The previous Pakistan players to score a century on their debut were Khalid Ibadulla, Javed Miandad, Saleem Malik, Mohammad Wasim, Ali Naqvi and Azhar Mahmood. This feat was later achieved by Taufeeq Umar, Yasir Hameed, Fawad Alam and Umar Akmal.) His score of 313, against Sri Lanka at the National Stadium, Karachi in 2009, is the third highest total by a Pakistan batsman in Test cricket and the twentieth highest overall. (Note: Previously, Hanif Mohammad and Inzamam-ul-Haq scored 337 and 329 runs respectively. Azhar Ali scored 302 not out in 2016.) Khan has scored 34 Test centuries at twenty-one cricket grounds, including 27 at venues outside Pakistan. He scored centuries in both innings of a Test match against Australia in January 2014 becoming seventh Pakistani to achieve the feat. (Note: The previous Pakistani to score centuries in both innings of a Test were Hanif (1962), Miandad (1984), Wajahatullah Wasti (1999), Yasir (2003), Inzamam (2005) and Mohammad Yousuf (2006). This feat was later achieved by Azhar Ali and Misbah-ul-Haq in 2014.)

In Test cricket, Khan is the first Pakistani batsman to score centuries against all the Test cricket playing teams and only cricketer to score to score centuries in eleven countries. He was most successful against Sri Lanka, making eight Test centuries against them. As of May 2024, he is joint sixth-overall among all-time Test century-makers, and top of the equivalent list for Pakistan. In October 2015, Khan became Pakistan's all-time leading run scorer in Test matches, overtaking Javed Miandad's tally of 8,832 runs, while playing against England. He is also the only Pakistani batsman to score over 10,000 Test runs. In August 2016, Khan scored his sixth double century (200 or more runs) during Tests to equal Javed Miandad’s record of scoring the most individual double tons for Pakistan in Test cricket. He also became only the second batsman after Kumar Sangakkara to register six scores of more than 200 against six different countries.

Khan made his ODI debut in February 2000 against Sri Lanka at the National Stadium, Khan's first century came against Hong Kong in July 2004 at the Sinhalese Sports Club Ground, Colombo. His score of 144 is his highest set in an ODI match. As of May 2024, he is 13th in the list of ODI century-makers for Pakistan, a position he shares with Zaheer Abbas. Khan played 25 Twenty20 International (T20I) matches between 2006 and 2010, and never scored a century in the format. His highest score in T20Is remained 51, against Sri Lanka during the 2007 ICC World Twenty20. He announced his retirement from T20Is after winning the 2009 ICC World Twenty20 for Pakistan. As of May 2024, he is jointly 18th overall among all-time combined century-makers, (Note: He shares the position with Shivnarine Chanderpaul.) and top of the equivalent list for Pakistan.

== Key ==
- * – Remained not out
- ‡ – Captain in that match
- † – Man of the match
- (D/L) – Result was determined by the Duckworth–Lewis method

== Test cricket centuries ==
Test centuries scored by Younis
No.	Score	Balls	Against	Pos.	Inn.	Test	S/R	Venue	H/A/N	Date	Result	Ref
1	107	250	Sri Lanka	7	3	1/3	42.80	Rawalpindi Cricket Stadium, Rawalpindi	Home	29 February 2000	Lost	
2	116	281	Sri Lanka	6	2	2/3	41.28	Galle International Stadium, Galle	Away	21 June 2000	Won	
3	149*	182	New Zealand	6	3	1/3	81.86	Eden Park, Auckland	Away	8 March 2001	Won	
4	119	217	Bangladesh	3	2	2/2	54.83	Chittagong Stadium, Chittagong	Away	16 January 2002	Won	
5	153 †	291	West Indies	3	1	2/2	52.57	Sharjah Cricket Association Stadium, Sharjah	Neutral	7 February 2002	Won	
6	124	215	Sri Lanka	3	2	2/2	57.67	National Stadium, Karachi	Home	28 October 2004	Lost	
7	147	258	India	3	3	2/3	56.97	Eden Gardens, Kolkata	Away	16 March 2005	Lost	
8	267 †	504	India	3	1	3/3	52.97	M. Chinnaswamy Stadium, Bangalore	Away	24 March 2005	Won	
9	106	190	West Indies	3	1	2/2	55.78	Sabina Park, Kingston	Away	3 June 2005	Won	
10	199	336	India	3	1	1/3	59.22	Gaddafi Stadium, Lahore	Home	13 January 2006	Drawn	
11	194	299	India	3	3	2/3	64.88	Iqbal Stadium, Faisalabad	Home	25 January 2006	Drawn	
12	173 †	285	England	3	2	3/3	60.70	Headingley Stadium, Leeds	Away	4 August 2006	Lost	
13	126	160	South Africa	3	4	1/3	78.75	National Stadium, Karachi	Home	1 October 2007	Lost	
14	130	246	South Africa	3	4	2/2	52.84	Gaddafi Stadium, Lahore	Home	8 October 2007	Drawn	
15	107* ‡	182	India	4	4	2/3	58.79	Eden Gardens, Kolkata	Away	30 November 2007	Drawn	
16	313 † ‡	568	Sri Lanka	3	2	1/2	55.10	National Stadium, Karachi	Home	21 February 2009	Drawn	
17	131* †	230	South Africa	4	4	1/2	56.95	DSC Cricket Stadium, Dubai	Neutral	12 November 2010	Drawn	
18	122	211	Sri Lanka	4	2	3/3	57.81	Sharjah Cricket Association Stadium, Sharjah	Neutral	3 November 2011	Drawn	
19	200* †	290	Bangladesh	4	2	1/2	68.96	Zohur Ahmed Chowdhury Stadium, Chittagong	Away	9 December 2011	Won	
20	127	221	England	4	3	3/3	57.46	DSC Cricket Stadium, Dubai	Neutral	3 February 2012	Won	
21	111	226	South Africa	4	1	2/3	49.11	Newlands, Cape Town	Away	14 February 2013	Lost	
22	200* †	404	Zimbabwe	4	3	1/2	49.50	Harare Sports Club, Harare	Away	3 September 2013	Won	
23	136	198	Sri Lanka	4	2	1/3	68.68	Sheikh Zayed Stadium, Abu Dhabi	Neutral	1 January 2014	Drawn	
24	177	331	Sri Lanka	4	1	1/2	53.47	Galle International Stadium, Galle	Away	7 August 2014	Lost	
25	106 †	223	Australia	4	1	1/2	47.53	DSC Cricket Stadium, Dubai	Neutral	22 October 2014	Won	
26	103* †	152	Australia	3	3	1/2	67.76	DSC Cricket Stadium, Dubai	Neutral	25 October 2014	Won	
27	213	349	Australia	4	1	2/2	61.03	Sheikh Zayed Stadium, Abu Dhabi	Neutral	30 October 2014	Won	
28	100*	141	New Zealand	4	1	1/3	70.92	Sheikh Zayed Stadium, Abu Dhabi	Neutral	10 November 2014	Won	
29	148	195	Bangladesh	4	1	2/2	75.89	Sher-e-Bangla National Cricket Stadium, Mirpur	Away	6 May 2015	Won	
30	171* †	271	Sri Lanka	4	4	3/3	63.09	Pallekele Cricket Stadium	Away	7 July 2015	Won	
31	118	211	England	4	3	2/3	55.92	DSC Cricket Stadium, Dubai	Neutral	25 October 2015	Won	
32	218 †	308	England	5	2	4/4	70.13	Kennington Oval, London	Away	12 August 2016	Won	
33	127	205	West Indies	4	1	2/3	61.95	Sheikh Zayed Cricket Stadium, Abu Dhabi	Neutral	21 October 2016	Won	
34	175*	334	Australia	4	2	3/3	52.39	Sydney Cricket Ground, Sydney	Away	3 January 2017	Lost	

== One Day International cricket centuries ==
ODI centuries scored by Younis
No.	Score	Against	Pos.	Inn.	S/R	Venue	H/A/N	Date	Result	Ref
1	144	Hong Kong	4	1	118.03	Sinhalese Sports Club Ground, Colombo	Neutral	18 July 2004	Won	
2	101 †	England	3	2	92.66	Rose Bowl, Southampton	Away	5 September 2006	Won	
3	117 †	India	3	2	106.36	Punjab Cricket Association Stadium, Mohali	Away	8 November 2007	Won	
4	108 †	India	3	1	109.09	Sher-e-Bangla National Stadium, Dhaka	Neutral	14 June 2008	Won	
5	123* †	India	3	2	105.12	National Stadium, Karachi	Home	2 July 2008	Won	
6	101 †	West Indies	3	1	84.87	Sheikh Zayed Stadium, Abu Dhabi	Neutral	16 November 2008	Won	
7	103	New Zealand	3	2	88.03	Sheikh Zayed Stadium, Abu Dhabi	Neutral	17 December 2014	Lost	
