= List of international cricket centuries by Saeed Anwar =

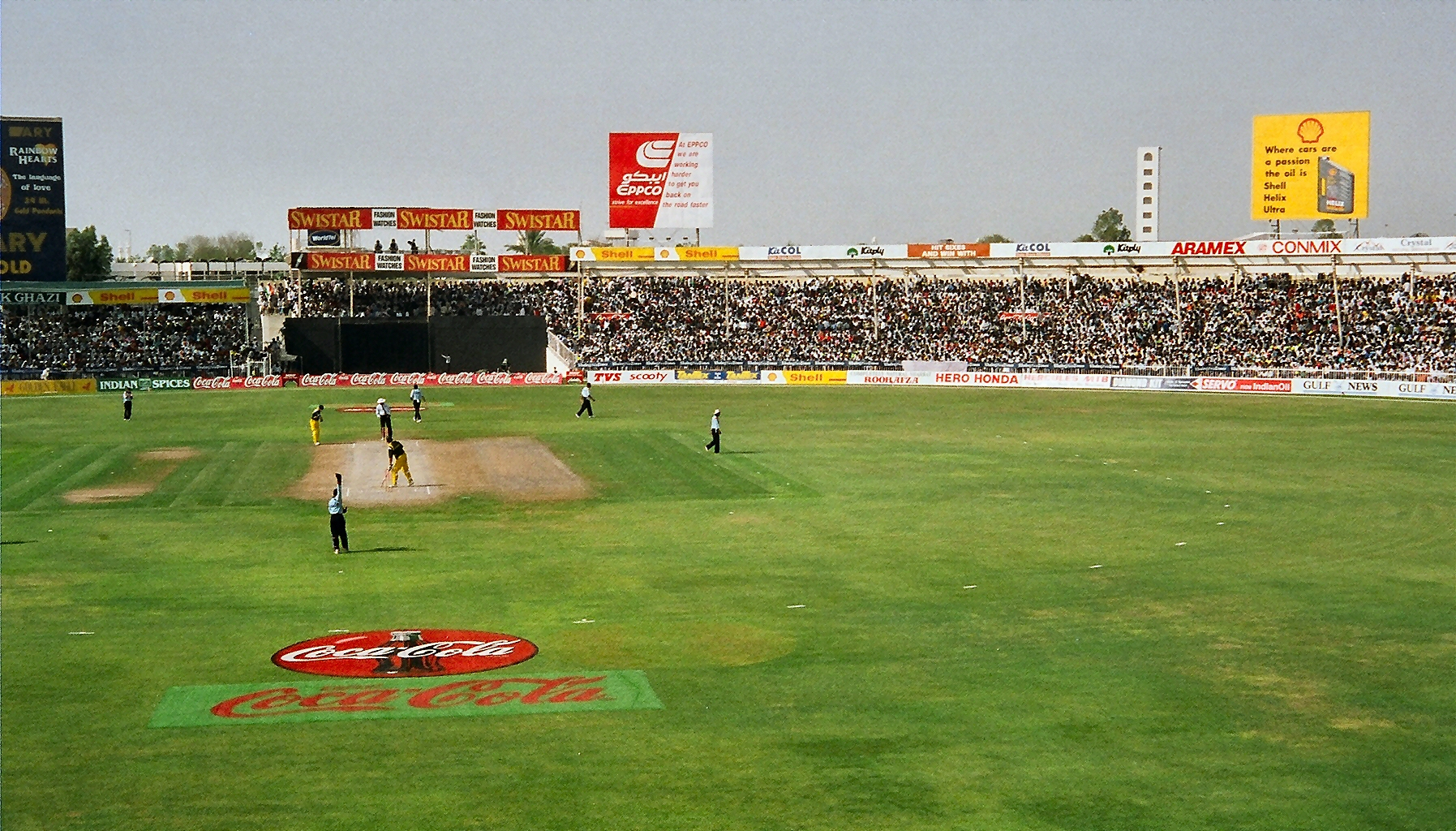
Saeed Anwar made seven of his ODI centuries at the Sharjah Cricket Association Stadium.

Saeed Anwar is a former Pakistani cricketer and captain of the Pakistan national cricket team. He has scored centuries (100 or more runs in a single innings) in Test matches and One Day International (ODI) matches on 11 and 20 occasions respectively during his international career. He played 55 Tests and 247 ODIs for Pakistan scoring 4,052 and 8,824 runs respectively. He was described by the BBC as "a world-class opener" and "one of the real batting stars of Pakistani cricket". Anwar was named as one of the Wisden Cricketers of the Year, in 1997, and the cricket almanac Wisden noted his "rapid run-scoring".

Anwar made his Test debut against the West Indies in a match where he was dismissed without scoring in either innings at the Iqbal Stadium, Faisalabad in 1990. His first Test century came against New Zealand at the Basin Reserve, Wellington in 1994. His highest Test score of 188 not out came against India during the 1998–99 Asian Test Championship at the Eden Gardens, Kolkata in February 1999. In the same innings, he became the third Pakistan opening batsman not to be dismissed at the close of an innings. (Note: The previous players to accomplish this feat were Nazar Mohammed and Mudassar Nazar.) Anwar scored Test centuries against seven different opponents at ten cricket grounds, including seven at venues outside Pakistan. As of November 2016, he is ninth in the list of Test century-makers for Pakistan, a position he shares with Asif Iqbal and Azhar Ali.

Anwar made his ODI debut during the 1988–89 Benson & Hedges World Series against the West Indies at the WACA Ground, Perth. He achieved his first ODI century a year later against Sri Lanka at the Adelaide Oval. He scored three consecutive centuries at the Sharjah Cricket Association Stadium in 1993, the second player to achieve this feat. (Note: This feat was previously accomplished by Zaheer Abbas and subsequently Herschelle Gibbs, AB de Villiers and Quinton de Kock.) Anwar's score of 194, the highest by a Pakistan batsman, was made against India at the M.A. Chidambaram Stadium, Chennai in 1997. (Note: Saeed Anwar broke Viv Richards' record for most runs in an ODI innings and held it for nearly 13 years. The score was equalled by Charles Coventry, it was broken by Sachin Tendulkar (200*), Virender Sehwag (219) and Rohit Sharma (209).) He scored all of his twenty ODI centuries against six different opponents, and was most successful against Sri Lanka, making seven against them. As of November 2016, Anwar is the leading ODI century-maker for Pakistan, and is twelfth in the list of ODI century-makers.

== Key ==
Key
Symbol	Meaning
*	Remained not out
†	Man of the match
‡	Captained the Pakistan cricket team
Balls	Balls faced
Pos.	Position in the batting order
Inn.	The innings of the match
Test	The number of the Test match played in that series
S/R	Strike rate during the innings
H/A/N	Venue was at home (Pakistan), away or neutral
Date	Date the match was held, or the starting date of match for Test matches
Lost	The match was lost by Pakistan
Won	The match was won by Pakistan
Drawn	The match was drawn
Tied	The match was tied

== Test cricket centuries ==
List of Test centuries
No.	Score	Against	Pos.	Inn.	Test	Venue	H/A/N	Date	Result	Ref
1	169	New Zealand	1	2	2/3	Basin Reserve, Wellington	Away	17 February 1994	Won	
2	136 †	Sri Lanka	1	3	1/3	P Saravanamuttu Stadium, Colombo	Away	9 August 1994	Won	
3	176	England	1	2	3/3	The Oval, London	Away	22 August 1996	Won	
4	149 ‡	New Zealand	1	2	2/2	Rawalpindi Cricket Stadium, Rawalpindi	Home	28 November 1996	Won	
5	118	South Africa	1	3	2/3	Kingsmead Cricket Ground, Durban	Away	26 February 1998	Won	
6	145	Australia	1	1	1/3	Rawalpindi Cricket Stadium, Rawalpindi	Home	1 October 1998	Lost	
7	126	Australia	1	2	2/3	Arbab Niaz Stadium, Peshawar	Home	15 October 1998	Drawn	
8	188* † (Note: Anwar shared the Man of the Match award with Javagal Srinath.)	India	1	3	1/4	Eden Gardens, Kolkata	Away	16 February 1999	Won	
9	119	Australia	1	3	1/3	Brisbane Cricket Ground, Brisbane	Away	5 November 1999	Lost	
10	123	Sri Lanka	1	2	2/3	Galle International Stadium, Galle	Away	21 June 2000	Won	
11	101	Bangladesh	1	2	1/3	Multan Cricket Stadium, Multan	Home	29 August 2001	Won	

== One Day International centuries ==
List of ODI centuries
No.	Score	Balls	Against	Pos.	Inn.	S/R	Venue	H/A/N	Date	Result	Ref
1	126 †	99	Sri Lanka	2	1	127.27	Adelaide Oval, Adelaide	Neutral	17 February 1990	Won	
2	101 †	115	New Zealand	1	1	87.82	Gaddafi Stadium, Lahore	Home	2 November 1990	Won	
3	110 †	105	Sri Lanka	1	1	104.76	Sharjah Cricket Association Stadium, Sharjah	Neutral	4 February 1993	Won	
4	107	108	Sri Lanka	1	1	99.07	Sharjah Cricket Association Stadium, Sharjah	Neutral	30 October 1993	Won	
5	131 †	141	West Indies	1	2	92.90	Sharjah Cricket Association Stadium, Sharjah	Neutral	1 November 1993	Won	
6	111 †	104	Sri Lanka	1	2	106.73	Sharjah Cricket Association Stadium, Sharjah	Neutral	2 November 1993	Won	
7	104* †	119	Australia	1	2	87.39	Rawalpindi Cricket Stadium, Rawalpindi	Home	22 October 1994	Won	
8	103* †	131	Zimbabwe	2	2	78.62	Harare Sports Club, Harare	Away	22 February 1995	Tied	
9	115 ‡	120	Sri Lanka	1	1	95.83	Nairobi Gymkhana Club, Nairobi	Neutral	4 October 1996	Won	
10	104* †	132	New Zealand	1	2	78.78	Sharjah Cricket Association Stadium, Sharjah	Neutral	10 November 1996	Won	
11	112* †	125	Sri Lanka	1	2	89.60	Sharjah Cricket Association Stadium, Sharjah	Neutral	12 November 1996	Won	
12	194 †	146	India	1	1	132.87	M.A. Chidambaram Stadium, Chennai	Away	21 May 1997	Won	
13	108* †	129	West Indies	2	2	83.72	Gaddafi Stadium, Lahore	Home	4 November 1997	Won	
14	104 †	128	India	1	2	81.25	Sharjah Cricket Association Stadium, Sharjah	Neutral	14 December 1997	Won	
15	140	132	India	1	1	106.06	Bangabandhu National Stadium, Dhaka	Neutral	18 January 1998	Lost	
16	103 †	144	Zimbabwe	1	1	71.52	Kennington Oval, London	Neutral	11 June 1999	Won	
17	113*	148	New Zealand	1	2	76.35	Old Trafford Cricket Ground, Manchester	Neutral	16 June 1999	Won	
18	105* †	134	Sri Lanka	1	2	78.35	Gymkhana Club Ground, Nairobi	Neutral	8 October 2000	Won	
19	104	115	New Zealand	1	1	90.43	Gymkhana Club Ground, Nairobi	Neutral	11 October 2000	Lost	
20	101	126	India	1	1	80.15	Centurion Park, Centurion	Neutral	1 March 2003	Lost	
