= List of international cricket centuries by Mohammad Yousuf =

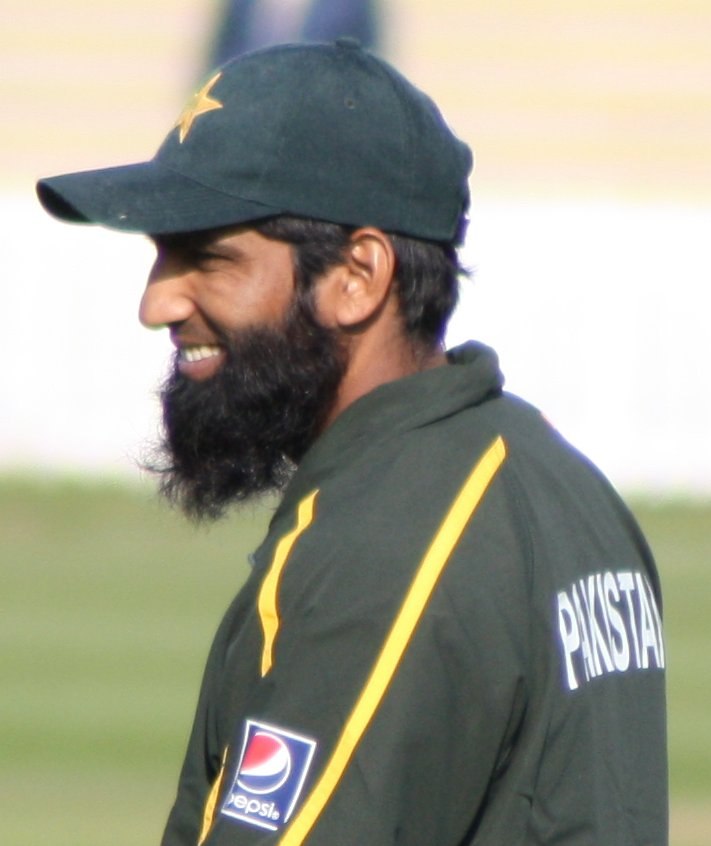
Mohammad Yousuf pictured during Pakistan's 2010 tour of England

Mohammad Yousuf (known before his conversion to Islam as Yousuf Youhana) is a Pakistan cricketer and former captain of the Pakistan national cricket team. He has scored centuries (100 or more runs) on 24 occasions in Test cricket and 15 times in One Day International (ODI) matches. As of February 2019, he has the second-highest number of centuries in international cricket for Pakistan. Described by one writer in 2010 as one of the best middle order batsmen ever, and by the West Indies cricketer Brian Lara in 2006 as "not just a role model for Pakistan cricket but for young cricketers around the world", Yousuf captained the Pakistan side in nine Tests and eight ODIs between 2003 and 2010. As of February 2019, he holds the world record for the most runs in Test matches during a calendar year, scoring 1,788 runs in 11 Tests during 2006. He scored nine international centuries in 2006, also a world record for a calendar year. In 2007, when he was named as one of the Wisden Cricketers of the Year, the cricket almanack Wisden noted his "stylishness" as well as his "appetite for runs".

Yousuf made his Test debut against South Africa in 1998. Later the same year, he reached his first Test century against Zimbabwe at the Gaddafi Stadium, Lahore, scoring 120 not out. His highest Test score of 223 came in a match against England at the same venue, during the 2005–06 series between the teams. He has made a double century (200 or more runs) on four occasions during Tests. Yousuf has scored Test centuries at 16 cricket grounds, including 12 at venues outside Pakistan. He is third in the list of Test century-makers for Pakistan behind Younis Khan (33) and Inzamam-ul-Haq (25).

Having made his ODI debut in 1998 against Zimbabwe at Harare Sports Club, Yousuf's first century came against Australia in November 1998. His highest ODI score is 141 not out against Zimbabwe at Queens Sports Club, Bulawayo, in 2002. He is second in the list of leading century-makers in ODIs for Pakistan behind Saeed Anwar, and has scored centuries against eight countries. Yousuf has made seven ODI centuries at home grounds and eight at other venues.

He has played three Twenty20 International (T20I) matches, all against England between 2006 and 2010; he did not score a century in any of the games. As of February 2019, he is joint nineteenth in the list of century-makers in international cricket, all formats of the game combined. (Note: He shares the position with Tillakaratne Dilshan and Joe Root.)

== Key ==
Symbol	Meaning
*	Remained not out
‡	Man of the match
†	Captained the Pakistan cricket team
Balls	Balls faced
Ma. No.	Match played by Yousuf during his career
Pos.	Position in the batting order
Inn.	The innings of the match
SR	Strike rate during the innings
H/A/N	Venue was at home (Pakistan), away or neutral
Date	Match starting day
Lost	The match was lost by Pakistan
Won	The match was won by Pakistan
Drawn	The match was drawn
Forfeit	Match awarded to England after Pakistan refused to continue playing

== Test cricket centuries ==
List of Test centuries scored by Mohammad Yousuf
No.	Score	Balls	Ma. No.	Against	Pos.	Inn.	SR	Venue	H/A/N	Date	Result
1	120* ‡	206	7	Zimbabwe	5	2	58.25	Gaddafi Stadium, Lahore	Home	10 December 1998	Drawn
2	115	235	20	West Indies	5	1	48.53	Kensington Oval, Bridgetown	Away	18 May 2000	Drawn
3	103*	232	21	West Indies	5	1	48.94	Antigua Recreation Ground, St John's	Away	25 May 2000	Lost
4	124	308	25	England	5	2	40.26	Gaddafi Stadium, Lahore	Home	15 November 2000	Drawn
5	117	242	27	England	5	1	48.35	National Stadium, Karachi	Home	7 December 2000	Lost
6	203	429	29	New Zealand	5	2	47.37	Jade Stadium, Christchurch	Away	15 March 2001	Drawn
7	102*	243	33	Bangladesh	5	2	41.98	Multan Cricket Stadium, Multan	Home	29 August 2001	Won
8	204* ‡	243	35	Bangladesh	5	2	83.95	Chittagong Stadium, Chittagong	Away	16 January 2001	Won
9	146	276	36	West Indies	5	1	52.90	Sharjah Cricket Association Stadium, Sharjah	Neutral	31 January 2001	Won
10	159 ‡	282	41	Zimbabwe	5	2	56.38	Queens Sports Club, Bulawayo	Away	16 November 2002	Won
11	112	164	49	India	5	3	68.29	Multan Cricket Stadium, Multan	Home	1 April 2004	Lost
12	111†	134	55	Australia	5	1	82.84	Melbourne Cricket Ground, Melbourne	Away	26 December 2004	Lost
13	104	179	58	India	4	2	58.10	Eden Gardens, Kolkata	Away	16 March 2005	Lost
14	223 ‡	373	62	England	4	2	59.78	Gaddafi Stadium, Lahore	Home	29 November 2005	Won
15	173	199	63	India	4	1	86.93	Gaddafi Stadium, Lahore	Home	13 January 2006	Drawn
16	126	179	64	India	4	3	70.39	Iqbal Stadium, Faisalabad	Home	21 January 2006	Drawn
17	202 ‡	330	67	England	4	2	61.21	Lord's Cricket Ground, London	Away	13 July 2006	Drawn
18	192	261	69	England	4	2	73.56	Headingley, Leeds	Away	4 August 2006	Lost
19	128	236	70	England	4	2	54.24	The Oval, London	Away	17 August 2006	Lost (Forfeit) (Note: The match was involuntarily forfeited under Law 21 of the Laws of Cricket. The Pakistani team refused to continuning play after being accused of ball tampering by umpire Darrell Hair. The Test was abandoned, and the match awarded to England. This was the first such instance in the 1,814 Tests and 129 years of cricket up to 2006.)
20	192	330	71	West Indies	4	2	58.18	Gaddafi Stadium, Lahore	Home	11 November 2006	Won
21	191 ‡	344	72	West Indies	4	3	55.52	Multan Cricket Stadium, Multan	Home	19 November 2006	Drawn
22	102 ‡	158	73	West Indies	4	1	64.56	National Stadium, Karachi	Home	27 November 2006	Won
23	124 ‡ (Note: This was Yousuf's second century in the match. He was the sixth Pakistani player (after Hanif Mohammad, Javed Miandad, Wajahatullah Wasti, Yasir Hameed and Inzamam-ul-Haq) to score centuries in both innings of a match.)	195	73	West Indies	4	3	63.59	National Stadium, Karachi	Home	27 November 2006	Won
24	112	186	80	Sri Lanka	5	3	60.21	Galle International Stadium, Galle	Away	4 July 2009	Lost

== ODI cricket centuries ==
List of ODI centuries scored by Mohammad Yousuf
No.	Runs	Balls	Ma. No.	Against	Pos.	Inn.	SR	Venue	H/A/N	Date	Result
1	100	111	10	Australia	5	1	90.09	Gaddafi Stadium, Lahore	Home	10 November 1998	Lost
2	104* ‡	114	26	West Indies	5	1	91.22	Toronto Cricket, Skating and Curling Club, Toronto	Neutral	18 September 1999	Won
3	100* ‡	112	59	India	3	1	89.28	Bangabandhu National Stadium, Dhaka	Neutral	3 June 2000	Won
4	112* ‡	108	91	Bangladesh	6	1	103.70	Bangabandhu National Stadium, Dhaka	Away	24 January 2002	Won
5	129 ‡	131	100	Sri Lanka	4	1	98.47	Sharjah Cricket Association Stadium, Sharjah	Neutral	17 April 2002	Won
6	125	155	101	New Zealand	3	1	80.64	National Stadium, Karachi	Home	21 April 2002	Won
7	141* ‡	147	112	Zimbabwe	3	1	95.91	Queens Sports Club, Bulawayo	Away	23 November 2002	Won
8	100* ‡	68	114	Zimbabwe	3	1	147.05	Harare Sports Club, Harare	Away	27 November 2002	Won
9	106 ‡	127	141	Bangladesh	3	1	83.46	Iqbal Stadium, Faisalabad	Home	12 September 2003	Won
10	107*	121	178	Sri Lanka	4	2	88.42	National Stadium, Karachi	Home	6 October 2004	Won
11	105 ‡	100	188	West Indies	4	1	105.00	WACA Ground, Perth	Neutral	1 February 2005	Won
12	101*	111	230	South Africa	4	1	90.99	Kingsmead cricket ground, Durban	Away	7 February 2007	Won
13	117 ‡	143	244	South Africa	4	1	81.81	Gaddafi Stadium, Lahore	Home	4 October 2007	Won
14	108*	111	256	Zimbabwe	4	2	97.29	Iqbal Stadium, Faisalabad	Home	30 January 2008	Won
15	108* ‡	103	258	Bangladesh	4	1	104.85	Gaddafi Stadium, Lahore	Home	8 April 2008	Won

== Notes and references ==
Notes
