= List of international cricket five-wicket hauls by Saqlain Mushtaq =

Saqlain Mushtaq, a former Pakistani cricketer, took 19 five-wicket hauls during his career in international cricket. A five-wicket haul (also known as a "five–for" or "fifer") refers to a bowler taking five or more wickets in a single innings. This is regarded by cricket critics as a notable achievement, and as of October 2024, only 54 bowlers have taken 15 or more five-wicket hauls at international level in their cricketing careers. A right-arm off break bowler who represented his country between 1995 and 2004, Saqlain was described by the BBC as "a revolution in the art of attacking off-spin bowling". Saqlain was named by Wisden as one of their Cricketers of the Year in 2000.

Saqlain made his Test debut in 1995 against Sri Lanka at the Arbab Niaz Stadium, Peshawar. His first Test five-wicket haul came in 1997 against the same team at the R. Premadasa Stadium, Colombo. In January 1999 against India at the M.A. Chidambaram Stadium, Chennai, he took a five-wicket haul in both innings of a Test match for the first time. He repeated this feat only once more in his career, at the Feroz Shah Kotla Ground, Delhi during the second Test of the same series. His career-best figures for an innings were 8 wickets for 164 runs against England at the Gaddafi Stadium, Lahore in November 2000. He took ten or more wickets in a match on three occasions.

Having made his One Day International (ODI) debut in September 1995 against Sri Lanka at the Jinnah Stadium, Gujranwala, Saqlain's first ODI five-wicket haul came the following year, against New Zealand, a match Pakistan won at the same venue. His career-best bowling figures in ODI cricket were 5 wickets for 20 runs against England at the Rawalpindi Cricket Stadium in 2000. As of 2017, Saqlain is one of the four bowlers to achieve an ODI hat-trick (three wickets in consecutive deliveries) on two or more different occasions, both against Zimbabwe; (Note: The other two bowlers to accomplish the feat are Wasim Akram and Chaminda Vaas, who each have two, and Lasith Malinga, who has taken three ODI hat-tricks.) one of his hat-tricks came during the 1999 Cricket World Cup. Saqlain took thirteen five-wicket hauls in Test cricket and six in ODIs. As of 2017, he is fourth in the list of five-wicket haul takers for Pakistan, all formats of the game combined.

== Key ==
Key
Symbol	Meaning
Date	Date the match was held, or starting date of the match for Test matches
Inn	Innings of the match in which the five-wicket haul was taken
Overs	Number of overs bowled in that innings
Runs	Runs conceded
Wkts	Number of wickets taken
Econ	Bowling economy rate (average runs per over)
Batsmen	Batsmen whose wickets were taken in the five-wicket haul
Result	Result for Pakistan in that match
†	Saqlain selected as "Man of the match"
‡	10 wickets or more taken in the match
*	One of two five-wicket hauls by Saqlain in a match

== Tests ==
Five-wicket hauls in Test cricket by Saqlain Mushtaq
No.	Date	Ground	Against	Inn	Overs	Runs	Wkts	Econ	Batsmen	Result
1	19 April 1997†	R. Premadasa Stadium, Colombo	Sri Lanka	1	44.2	89	5	2.00	Marvan Atapattu; Hashan Tillakaratne; Romesh Kaluwitharana; Kumar Dharmasena; Nuwan Zoysa	Drawn
2	6 October 1997	Rawalpindi Cricket Stadium, Rawalpindi	South Africa	2	62	129	5	2.08	Gary Kirsten; Adam Bacher; Jacques Kallis; Daryll Cullinan; Brian McMillan	Drawn
3	6 December 1997†	National Stadium, Karachi	West Indies	1	24	54	5	2.25	Sherwin Campbell; Brian Lara; Roland Holder; Ian Bishop; Phil Edmonds; Courtney Walsh	Won
4	10 December 1998	Gaddafi Stadium, Lahore	Zimbabwe	1	13.5	32	5	2.31	Craig Wishart; Heath Streak; Henry Olonga; Adam Huckle; Pommie Mbangwa	Drawn
5	28 January 1999*‡	M.A. Chidambaram Stadium, Chennai	India	2	35	94	5	2.68	Rahul Dravid; Sachin Tendulkar; Mohammad Azharuddin; Nayan Mongia; Anil Kumble	Won
6	28 January 1999*‡	M.A. Chidambaram Stadium, Chennai	India	4	32.2	93	5	2.87	Sachin Tendulkar; Mohammad Azharuddin; Sourav Ganguly; Sunil Joshi; Javagal Srinath	Won
7	4 February 1999*‡	Feroz Shah Kotla Ground, Delhi	India	1	35.5	94	5	2.62	Sadagoppan Ramesh; Rahul Dravid; Sachin Tendulkar; Anil Kumble; Javagal Srinath	Lost
8	4 February 1999*‡	Feroz Shah Kotla Ground, Delhi	India	3	46.4	122	5	2.61	Rahul Dravid; Anil Kumble; Javagal Srinath; Venkatesh Prasad; Harbhajan Singh	Lost
9	18 November 1999	Bellerive Oval, Hobart	Australia	2	24	46	6	1.91	Michael Slater; Justin Langer; Adam Gilchrist; Shane Warne; Damien Fleming; Glenn McGrath	Lost
10	18 May 2000	Kensington Oval, Bridgetown	West Indies	2	51	121	5	2.37	Sherwin Campbell; Jimmy Adams; Ridley Jacobs; Reon King; Courtney Walsh	Drawn
11	15 November 2000†	Gaddafi Stadium, Lahore	England	1	74	164	8	2.21	Mike Atherton; Marcus Trescothick; Graham Thorpe; Alec Stewart; Nasser Hussain; Graeme Hick; Craig White; Ian Salisbury	Drawn
12	16 January 2002	MA Aziz Stadium, Chittagong	Bangladesh	1	16.4	35	5	2.10	Javed Omar; Habibul Bashar; Sanwar Hossain; Khaled Mashud; Mohammad Sharif	Won
13	16 November 2002‡	Queens Sports Club, Bulawayo	Zimbabwe	1	25.5	66	7	2.55	Alistair Campbell; Grant Flower; Hamilton Masakadza; Tatenda Taibu; Andy Blignaut; Ray Price; Henry Olonga	Won

== One Day Internationals ==
Five-wicket hauls in One Day Internationals by Saqlain Mushtaq
No.	Date	Ground	Against	Inn	Overs	Runs	Wkts	Econ	Batsmen	Result
1	4 December 1996	Jinnah Stadium, Gujranwala	New Zealand	2	9.4	44	5	4.55	Stephen Fleming; Nathan Astle; Dipak Patel; Chris Harris; Lee Germon	Won
2	15 December 1996†	Adelaide Oval, Adelaide	Australia	2	8.5	29	5	3.28	Steve Waugh; Mark Taylor; Tom Moody; Ian Healy; Shane Warne	Won
3	16 July 1997	R. Premadasa Stadium, Colombo	Bangladesh	2	9.3	38	5	4.00	Athar Ali Khan; Aminul Islam; Akram Khan; Khaled Mashud; Saiful Islam	Won
4	13 September 1997	Toronto Cricket, Skating and Curling Club, Toronto	India	1	10	45	5	4.50	Mohammad Azharuddin; Ajay Jadeja; Robin Singh; Abey Kuruvilla; Harvinder Singh	Lost
5	31 May 1999	County Cricket Ground, Northampton	Bangladesh	1	10	35	5	3.50	Shahriar Hossain; Mehrab Hossain; Minhajul Abedin; Khaled Mahmud; Mohammad Rafique	Lost
6	30 October 2000	Rawalpindi Cricket Stadium, Rawalpindi	England	1	8	20	5	2.50	Marcus Trescothick; Graeme Hick; Craig White; Ashley Giles; Darren Gough	Won
