= List of international cricket centuries by Javed Miandad =

Cricket records

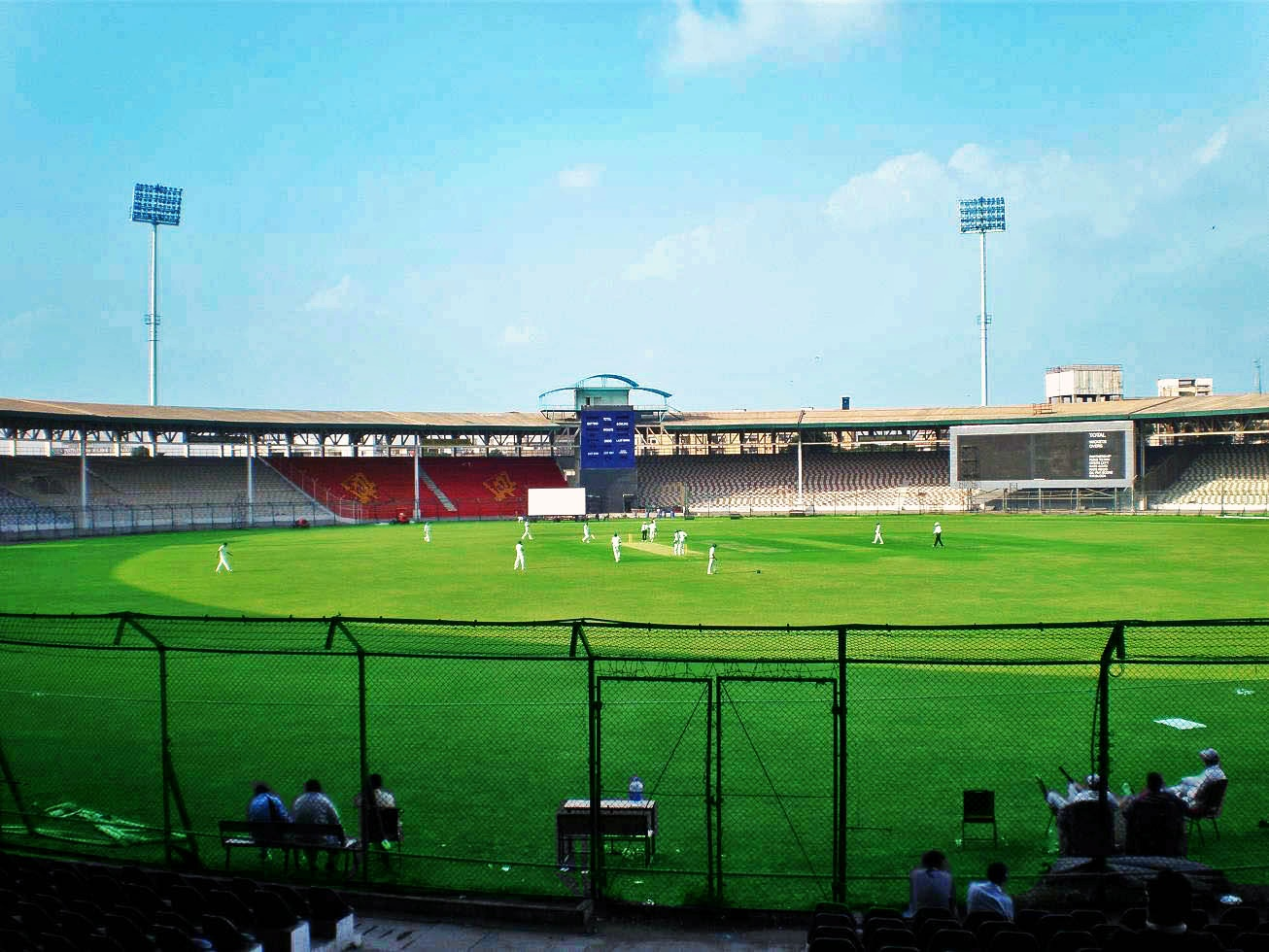
Miandad made two of his double centuries at the National Stadium, Karachi.

Javed Miandad is a former batsman and captain of Pakistan. He scored 23 centuries in Test cricket and 8 One Day International (ODI) hundreds during his 17-year international career. Miandad played 124 Test matches and notched 8,832 runs to remain the leading scorer for Pakistan in Test cricket. In 233 ODI matches, he scored 7,381 runs. In 1982, he was named as one of the Wisden Cricketers of the Year; the cricket almanac tagged him as "one of the best and most exciting players in the world". He was inducted into the ICC Cricket Hall of Fame in January 2009.

Miandad scored century on his Test debut against New Zealand at the Gaddafi Stadium, Lahore, in 1976. He was only the second Pakistan player to achieve this feat. (Note: The previous Pakistan player to score a century on debut was Khalid Ibadulla. This feat was later accomplished by Salim Malik, Mohammad Wasim, Ali Naqvi, Azhar Mahmood, Younis Khan, Taufeeq Umar, Yasir Hameed, Fawad Alam and Umar Akmal.) In the third and final Test of the series at National Stadium, Karachi, he made 206 runs and, at 19 years and 141 days, became the youngest ever player to complete a double hundred. Seven years later, in 1983, Miandad realized his highest Test score, an unbeaten 280, against India at the Niaz Stadium, Hyderabad.

In Test cricket, Miandad made a double century on six occasions. He also scored a century in his 100th Test match and is only the second player to do so in the annals of the game. (Note: The previous player to achieve this feat was Colin Cowdrey. This feat was also achieved later by Inzamam-ul-Haq, Gordon Greenidge, Alec Stewart, Ricky Ponting and Graeme Smith.) Miandad scored Test hundreds at thirteen cricket grounds, including nine at venues outside Pakistan. Four of his Test centuries came while captaining his team. As of August 2012, he was twenty-first in the overall list of most hundreds in a Test career.

Having made his ODI debut in 1975 against the West Indies at Edgbaston, Birmingham, Miandad scored his first ODI century against India at Municipal Stadium, Gujranwala, in 1982. His highest ODI score of 119 not out came in a match which Pakistan lost to India at the Gaddafi Stadium, on 31 December 1982. As of August 2012, he was thirtieth overall among all-time combined century makers, a position he shares with Saeed Anwar and Aravinda de Silva.

== Key ==
Key
Symbol	Meaning
*	Remained not out
†	Man of the match
‡	Captained the Pakistan cricket team
Balls	Balls faced
Pos.	Position in the batting order
Inn.	The innings of the match
Test	The number of the Test match played in that series
H/A/N	Venue was at home (Pakistan), away or neutral
Date	Date the match was held, or the starting date of the match for Test matches
Lost	The match was lost by Pakistan
Won	The match was won by Pakistan
Drawn	The match was drawn

== Test cricket centuries ==
List of Test centuries
No.	Score	Against	Pos.	Inn.	Test	Venue	H/A/N	Date	Result	Ref
1	163	New Zealand	5	1	1/3	Gaddafi Stadium, Lahore	Home	9 October 1976	Won	
2	206	New Zealand	4	1	3/3	National Stadium, Karachi	Home	30 October 1976	Drawn	
3	154*	India	5	1	1/3	Iqbal Stadium, Faisalabad	Home	16 October 1978	Drawn	
4	100	India	6	2	3/3	National Stadium, Karachi	Home	14 November 1978	Won	
5	160* †	New Zealand	4	3	1/3	Lancaster Park, Christchurch	Away	2 February 1979	Won	
6	129*	Australia	4	1	2/2	WACA Ground, Perth	Away	24 March 1979	Lost	
7	106*	Australia	4	2	2/3	Iqbal Stadium, Faisalabad	Home	6 March 1980	Drawn	
8	138	Australia	5	2	3/3	Gaddafi Stadium, Lahore	Home	14 October 1982	Won	
9	126	India	4	2	3/5	Iqbal Stadium, Faisalabad	Home	3 January 1983	Won	
10	280* †	India	4	1	4/5	Niaz Stadium, Hyderabad	Home	14 January 1983	Won	
11	131	Australia	4	2	3/5	Adelaide Oval, Adelaide	Away	9 December 1983	Drawn	
12	104 †	New Zealand	4	2	2/3	Niaz Stadium, Hyderabad	Home	25 November 1984	Won	
13	103* †	New Zealand	4	4	2/3	Niaz Stadium, Hyderabad	Home	25 November 1984	Won	
14	203* ‡	Sri Lanka	4	2	1/3	Iqbal Stadium, Faisalabad	Home	16 October 1985	Drawn	
15	260 †	England	4	1	5/5	The Oval, London	Away	6 August 1987	Drawn	
16	114	West Indies	4	2	1/3	Bourda, Georgetown	Away	2 April 1988	Won	
17	102	West Indies	4	4	2/3	Queen's Park Oval, Port of Spain	Away	14 April 1988	Drawn	
18	211 † ‡	Australia	4	1	1/3	National Stadium, Karachi	Home	15 September 1988	Won	
19	107 ‡	Australia	4	3	2/3	Iqbal Stadium, Faisalabad	Home	23 September 1988	Drawn	
20	118	New Zealand	4	2	2/3	Basin Reserve, Wellington	Away	10 February 1989	Drawn	
21	271 †	New Zealand	4	1	3/3	Eden Park, Auckland	Away	24 February 1989	Drawn	
22	145	India	4	2	3/4	Gaddafi Stadium, Lahore	Home	1 December 1989	Drawn	
23	153* ‡	England	4	1	1/5	Edgbaston Cricket Ground, Birmingham	Away	4 June 1992	Won	

== One Day International centuries ==
List of ODI centuries
No.	Score	Balls	Against	Pos.	Inn.	S/R	Venue	H/A/N	Date	Result	Ref
1	106 †	106	India	4	1	100.00	Municipal Stadium, Gujranwala	Home	3 December 1982	Won	
2	119* †	77	India	4	1	154.54	Gaddafi Stadium, Lahore	Home	31 December 1982	Lost	
3	116* †	114	India	4	2	101.75	Sharjah Cricket Association Stadium, Sharjah	Neutral	18 April 1986	Won	
4	113	145	England	4	1	77.93	Kennington Oval, London	Away	21 May 1987	Lost	
5	103 †	100	Sri Lanka	4	1	103.00	Niaz Stadium, Hyderabad	Home	8 October 1987	Won	
6	100 †	99	West Indies	4	1	101.01	Bourda, Georgetown	Neutral	30 March 1988	Lost	
7	115* †	119	Sri Lanka	3	1	111.65	Niaz Stadium, Hyderabad	Home	15 January 1992	Won	
8	107 †	144	South Africa	4	1	74.30	Buffalo Park, East London	Away	13 February 1993	Won	
