= Shantha Jayasekera =

Canadian cricketer

Personal information
- Full name: Shantha Dhammika A. Jayasekera
- Born: 6 June 1963 (age 63); Colombo, Sri Lanka
- Batting: Right-handed
- Bowling: Right-arm off-spin
- Role: Batsman
- Relatives: Rohan Jayasekera (brother)

International information
- National side: Canada (1989–2004)
- Source: CricketArchive, 11 March 2016

Shantha Dhammika A. Jayasekera (born 6 June 1963) is a former international cricketer who represented the Canadian national team between 1994 and 2004. He played as a right-handed middle-order batsman.

Jayasekera was born in Colombo, Sri Lanka, and attended S. Thomas' College, Mount Lavinia, representing the school in the annual Royal–Thomian fixture in 1981 and 1982. His older brother, Rohan Jayasekera, represented both the Sri Lankan national team and the Canadian national team, although the brothers never played together at international level. Shantha Jayasekera made his debut for Canada at the 1994 ICC Trophy in Kenya. He played in six of his team's seven matches, but had little success, scoring only 71 runs (with a best of 39 against Bermuda). After his debut, Jayasekera did not play in another international tournament for over ten years. He finally returned to the national team for the 2004 ICC Six Nations Challenge, where matches held List A status. Aged 40, Jayasekera played in three of Canada's five matches, scoring 46 runs. In his first match of the tournament, against the United Arab Emirates, he was out for a golden duck, although he top-scored with 34 from 65 balls in the next match (against the Netherlands).

In February 2020, he was named in Canada's squad for the Over-50s Cricket World Cup in South Africa. However, the tournament was cancelled during the third round of matches due to the coronavirus pandemic.
