= List of international cricket five-wicket hauls by Shoaib Akhtar =

Shoaib Akhtar took four five-wicket hauls in One Day International cricket.

Shoaib Akhtar, a Pakistani former cricketer, took 16 five-wicket hauls during his career in international cricket. A five-wicket haul (also known as a "five–for" or "fifer") refers to a bowler taking five or more wickets in a single innings. This is regarded as a notable achievement, and as of October 2024, only 54 bowlers have taken 15 or more five-wicket hauls at international level in their cricketing careers. A fast bowler who represented his country from 1997 to 2011, BBC described Shoaib as "one of the fastest bowlers ever to play the game".

Shoaib made his Test debut in 1997 against the West Indies at the Rawalpindi Cricket Stadium, where he took two wickets in the first innings. His first Test five-wicket haul came the following year against South Africa, a match Pakistan won at the Kingsmead Cricket Ground, Durban. Shoaib took a pair of five-wicket hauls against New Zealand at the Basin Reserve, Wellington in December 2003. His career-best figures for an innings were 6 wickets for 11 runs against New Zealand at the Gaddafi Stadium, Lahore, in May 2002. Shoaib took twelve five-wicket hauls in Test cricket and ten or more wickets per match twice in the format.

Having made his One Day International (ODI) debut in October 1998 against Zimbabwe at the Harare Sports Club, Shoaib's first five-wicket haul came against New Zealand in 2001, a match Pakistan won at the Eden Park, Auckland. His best bowling performance in ODIs was 6 wickets for 16 runs against New Zealand at the National Stadium, Karachi, in December 2001. Shoaib played 19 Twenty20 Internationals for Pakistan, however he never took a five-wicket haul in this format. He retired from international cricket after the 2011 Cricket World Cup. As of 2014, he is sixth in the list of five-wicket haul takers for Pakistan, all formats of the game combined.

== Key ==
Symbol	Meaning
Date	Day the Test started or ODI held
Inn	Innings of the match in which the five-wicket haul was taken
Overs	Number of overs bowled in that innings
Runs	Runs conceded
Wkts	Number of wickets taken
Econ	Bowling economy rate (average runs per over)
Batsmen	Batsmen whose wickets were taken in the five-wicket haul
Result	Result for Pakistan in that match
*	One of two five-wicket hauls by Shoaib in a match
†	10 wickets or more taken in the match
‡	Shoaib was selected as man of the match

== Tests ==
Five-wicket hauls in Test cricket by Shoaib Akhtar
No.	Date	Ground	Against	Inn	Overs	Runs	Wkts	Econ	Batsmen	Result
1	28 February 1998	Kingsmead Cricket Ground, Durban	South Africa	2	12	43	5	3.58	Jacques Kallis; Andrew Hudson; Mark Boucher; Lance Klusener; Fanie de Villiers	Won
2	5 March 2000	Arbab Niaz Stadium, Peshawar	Sri Lanka	1	24.3	75	5	3.06	Marvan Atapattu; Sanath Jayasuriya; Romesh Kaluwitharana; Pramodya Wickramasinghe; Muttiah Muralitharan	Lost
3	31 January 2002 ‡	Sharjah Cricket Association Stadium, Sharjah (neutral venue)	West Indies	4	16	24	5	1.50	Daren Ganga; Chris Gayle; Wavell Hinds; Mervyn Dillon; Cameron Cuffy	Won
4	1 May 2002	Gaddafi Stadium, Lahore	New Zealand	2	8.2	11	6	1.32	Mark Richardson; Matt Horne; Stephen Fleming; Chris Harris; Brooke Walker; Chris Martin	Won
5	3 October 2002	P Saravanamuttu Stadium, Colombo	Australia	3	8	21	5	2.62	Ricky Ponting; Mark Waugh; Steve Waugh; Adam Gilchrist; Shane Warne	Lost
6	27 August 2003 † ‡	Arbab Niaz Stadium, Peshawar	Bangladesh	1	22.5	50	6	2.18	Javed Omar; Mohammad Ashraful; Alok Kapali; Khaled Mashud; Khaled Mahmud; Mohammad Rafique	Won
7	26 December 2003 * † ‡	Basin Reserve, Wellington	New Zealand	1	30.3	48	5	2.34	Lou Vincent; Stephen Fleming; Scott Styris; Robbie Hart; Ian Butler	Won
8	26 December 2003 * † ‡	Basin Reserve, Wellington	New Zealand	3	18	30	6	1.66	Mark Richardson; Lou Vincent; Richard Jones; Scott Styris; Robbie Hart; Ian Butler	Won
9	20 October 2004	Iqbal Stadium, Faisalabad	Sri Lanka	1	19	60	5	3.15	Marvan Atapattu; Kumar Sangakkara; Thilan Samaraweera; Chaminda Vaas; Dilhara Fernando	Lost
10	16 December 2004	WACA Ground, Perth	Australia	1	22	99	5	4.50	Matthew Hayden; Darren Lehmann; Michael Clarke; Jason Gillespie; Michael Kasprowicz	Lost
11	26 December 2004	Melbourne Cricket Ground, Melbourne	Australia	2	27	109	5	4.03	Matthew Hayden; Ricky Ponting; Darren Lehmann; Shane Warne; Michael Kasprowicz	Lost
12	29 November 2005	Gaddafi Stadium, Lahore	England	3	19	71	5	3.73	Marcus Trescothick; Michael Vaughan; Ian Bell; Geraint Jones; Liam Plunkett	Won

== One Day Internationals ==
Five-wicket hauls in ODI cricket by Shoaib Akhtar
No.	Date	Ground	Against	Inn	Overs	Runs	Wkts	Econ	Batsmen	Result
1	17 February 2001 ‡	Eden Park, Auckland	New Zealand	1	6.3	19	5	2.92	Jacob Oram; Lou Vincent; Daniel Vettori; James Franklin; Daryl Tuffey	Won
2	21 April 2002 ‡	National Stadium, Karachi	New Zealand	2	9	16	6	1.77	Craig McMillan; Jacob Oram; Robbie Hart; Andre Adams; Ian Butler; Brooke Walker	Won
3	19 June 2002 ‡	Brisbane Cricket Ground, Brisbane	Australia	2	8	25	5	3.12	Ricky Ponting; Damien Martyn; Darren Lehmann; Michael Bevan; Jason Gillespie	Won
4	12 December 2005	Gaddafi Stadium, Lahore	England	1	8.4	54	5	6.23	Marcus Trescothick; Andrew Strauss; Geraint Jones; Ian Blackwell; Liam Plunkett	Won
