= Rohan Jayasekera (cricketer) =

Canadian cricketer

Rohan Jayasekera රොහාන් ජයසේකර
Personal information
- Full name: Rohan Stanley Amarasiriwardene Jayasekera
- Born: 7 December 1957 (age 68); Colombo, Sri Lanka
- Batting: Right-handed
- Role: Wicket-keeper
- Relatives: Shantha Jayasekera (brother)

International information
- National sides: Sri Lanka (1982); Canada
- Only Test (cap 13): 22 March 1982; Sri Lanka v Pakistan
- ODI debut (cap 21): 13 February 1982; Sri Lanka v England
- Last ODI: 12 March 1982; Sri Lanka v Pakistan

Career statistics
Competition	Test	ODI	FC	LA
Matches	1	2	8	4
Runs scored	2	17	356	44
Batting average	1.00	17.00	29.66	22.00
100s/50s	0/0	0/0	0/3	0/0
Top score	2	17	79*	27
Catches/stumpings	0/0	0/0	6/2	1/1
- Source: Cricinfo, 31 January 2016

Rohan Stanley Amarasiriwardene Jayasekera (born 7 December 1957), or Rohan Jayasekera, is a former Sri Lankan cricketer who represented Sri Lanka in one Test match and two One Day Internationals, and Canada in four ICC Trophy matches.

== Domestic career ==
He made his first class debut in 1978–1979 when he batted at three and kept wicket for a Sri Lanka Board XI who lost by 113 runs to the West Indies. He was picked for the Sri Lankan tour of England in the summer of 1979. This tour did not include any Test or ODI matches, as Sri Lanka did not have such status at the time. However, it did include the 1979 ICC Trophy, where Jayasekera played one match against Netherlands. Jayasekera only scored five runs in the 45-run victory. He did make two half-centuries on tour, however, scoring 79 not out in a drawn match against a Worcestershire side including internationals Vanburn Holder and Younis Ahmed, and a second-innings 55 against Glamorgan.

== International career ==
Following the tour of England, Jayasekera did not play at senior level for Sri Lanka again until 1981–1982, when a second-innings 52 for a Board XI against England saw him receive a call-up as wicket-keeper to the national side for Sri Lanka's first international, against England. Batting at three, Jayasekara ground out 17 runs from 42 deliveries, as his team chased 212 to win in 45 overs (or 270 deliveries). His slow scoring left it to the lower order to accumulate runs, and they nearly managed, but Sri Lanka still lost by five runs.

Jayasekera was dropped in favour of Mahes Goonatilleke for the next ODI, but was taken – along with Goonatilleke – for the tour of Pakistan in 1981–1982. He played the first ODI, as wicket-keeper, and despite not batting in that ODI he was given a chance batting at No. 3 in the third and final Test match of the tour. However, he was bowled by Imran Khan for a three-ball 0 in his first innings, and despite being shuffled down to No. 6 in the second innings he was once again bowled by Imran, this time for 2.

== Canada cricket ==
This was Jayasekera's last representative match for Sri Lanka. He moved to Canada later on, representing them in four matches at the 1986 ICC Trophy, and recorded ducks against United States and the Netherlands. He did, however, smack 41 not out against Fiji in Canada's thumping 247-run victory, their last match of the tournament. He also kept wicket against Fiji. His younger brother Shantha Jayasekera represented Canada in the 1994 ICC Trophy.

In February 2020, he was named in Canada's squad for the Over-50s Cricket World Cup in South Africa. However, the tournament was cancelled during the third round of matches due to the coronavirus pandemic.

== See also ==
- One-Test wonder
