= England cricket team Test results (1990–2004) =

List of cricket results

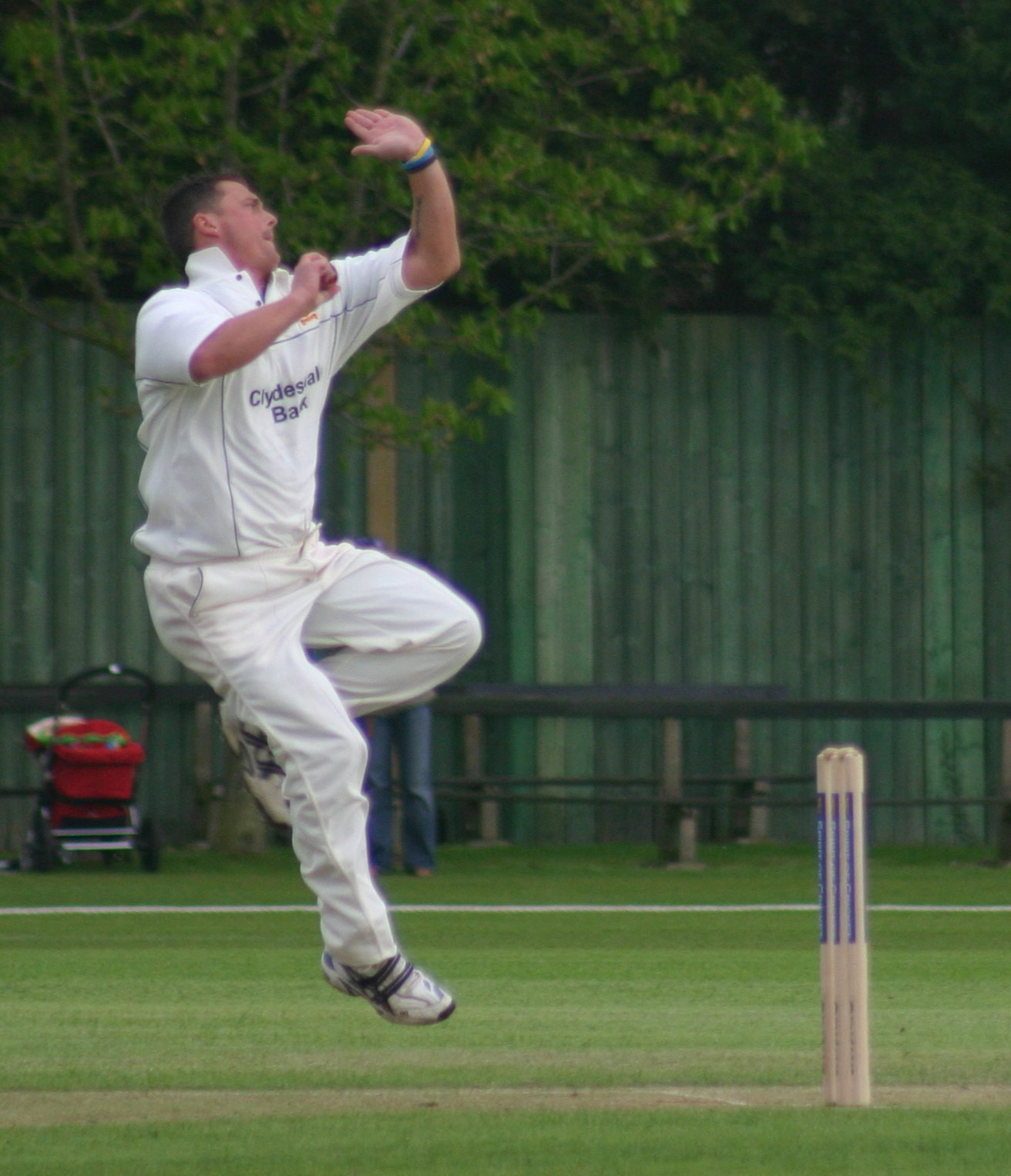
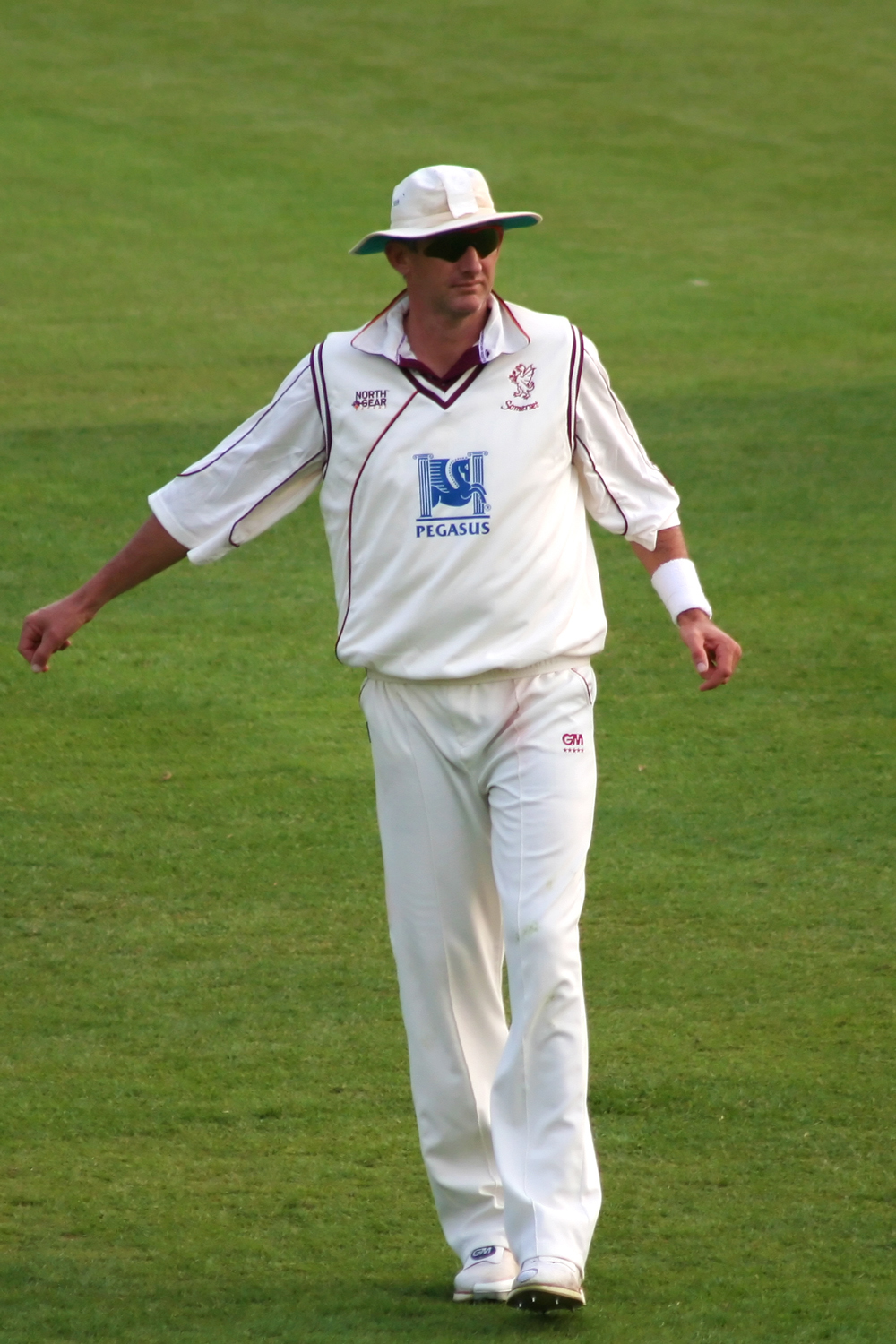
Darren Gough and Andy Caddick were England's leading wicket-takers in Test cricket between 1990 and 2004.

The England cricket team represents England and Wales in Test cricket; until 1992, they also incorporated Scotland. (Note: The England cricket team represented Scotland until 1992, when Scotland left the UK Cricket Council and later joined the International Cricket Council (ICC) as an independent member.) Between 1990 and 2004, England played 172 Test matches, resulting in 58 victories, 53 draws and 61 defeats. They faced both Bangladesh and Zimbabwe for the first time in Test cricket during this period, and also played South Africa for the first time in almost 30 years after their apartheid-era sporting boycott was lifted. The period includes what is often described as the England cricket team's lowest point: when they fell to the bottom of the ICC Test rankings in 1999.

England faced the West Indies most frequently during this period—playing 39 matches against them—closely followed by 37 matches against Australia. England won more matches than they lost against Bangladesh, New Zealand, Sri Lanka, the West Indies and Zimbabwe. Against South Africa they won seven and lost seven, while they had losing records against Australia, India and Pakistan. England won nine matches by an innings, with their largest victory being by an innings and 209 runs against Zimbabwe in 2000. They won by ten wickets three times during this period, and their largest victory by runs alone was against Bangladesh in 2003–04, whom they beat by 329 runs. Conversely, England suffered their third-largest ever defeat by an innings, losing to Sri Lanka by an innings and 215 runs during their tour there in 2003–04. Overall, England lost by an innings 20 times between 1990 and 2004.

== Key ==
Key
Symbol	Meaning
No. (Eng.)	Match number for England (i.e. 700 was England's 700th Test match)
No. (Ove.)	Match number overall (i.e. 1300 was the 1300th Test match)
Opposition	The team England were playing against
Venue	The cricket ground where the match was played
H/A	Whether the venue is home (England or Wales) or away (opponent's home)
Start date	Starting date of the Test match
Result	Result of the match for England
Series (result)	What series the match was part of, with the result listed in brackets; England's tally first (i.e. (2–1) means that England won two matches, and their opponents won one match)

== Matches ==
England Test cricket results between 1990 and 2004
No. (Eng.)	No. (Ove.)	Opposition	Venue	H/A	Start date	Result	Series (result)
658	1140	West Indies	Sabina Park, Kingston	Away	24 February 1990	Won by 9 wickets	England in the West Indies, 1989–90 (1–2)
659	1142	West Indies	Queen's Park Oval, Port of Spain	Away	23 March 1990	Match drawn	England in the West Indies, 1989–90 (1–2)
660	1143	West Indies	Kensington Oval, Bridgetown	Away	5 April 1990	Lost by 164 runs	England in the West Indies, 1989–90 (1–2)
661	1144	West Indies	Antigua Recreation Ground, St John's	Away	12 April 1990	Lost by an innings and 32 runs	England in the West Indies, 1989–90 (1–2)
662	1145	New Zealand	Trent Bridge, Nottingham	Home	7 June 1990	Match drawn	New Zealand in England, 1990 (1–0)
663	1146	New Zealand	Lord's, London	Home	21 June 1990	Match drawn	New Zealand in England, 1990 (1–0)
664	1147	New Zealand	Edgbaston, Birmingham	Home	5 July 1990	Won by 114 runs	New Zealand in England, 1990 (1–0)
665	1148	India	Lord's, London	Home	26 July 1990	Won by 247 runs	India in England, 1990 (1–0)
666	1149	India	Old Trafford, Manchester	Home	9 August 1990	Match drawn	India in England, 1990 (1–0)
667	1150	India	The Oval, London	Home	23 August 1990	Match drawn	India in England, 1990 (1–0)
668	1155	Australia	The Gabba, Brisbane	Away	23 November 1990	Lost by 10 wickets	1990–91 Ashes series (0–3)
669	1159	Australia	Melbourne Cricket Ground, Melbourne	Away	26 December 1990	Lost by 8 wickets	1990–91 Ashes series (0–3)
670	1160	Australia	Sydney Cricket Ground, Sydney	Away	4 January 1991	Match drawn	1990–91 Ashes series (0–3)
671	1161	Australia	Adelaide Oval, Adelaide	Away	25 January 1991	Match drawn	1990–91 Ashes series (0–3)
672	1163	Australia	WACA Ground, Perth	Away	1 February 1991	Lost by 9 wickets	1990–91 Ashes series (0–3)
673	1171	West Indies	Headingley, Leeds	Home	6 June 1991	Won by 115 runs	West Indies in England, 1991 (2–2)
674	1172	West Indies	Lord's, London	Home	20 June 1991	Match drawn	West Indies in England, 1991 (2–2)
675	1173	West Indies	Trent Bridge, Nottingham	Home	4 July 1991	Lost by 9 wickets	West Indies in England, 1991 (2–2)
676	1174	West Indies	Edgbaston, Birmingham	Home	25 July 1991	Lost by 7 wickets	West Indies in England, 1991 (2–2)
677	1175	West Indies	The Oval, London	Home	8 August 1991	Won by 5 wickets	West Indies in England, 1991 (2–2)
678	1176	Sri Lanka	Lord's, London	Home	22 August 1991	Won by 137 runs	Sri Lanka in England, 1991 (1–0)
679	1183	New Zealand	Lancaster Park, Christchurch	Away	18 January 1992	Won by an innings and 4 runs	England in New Zealand, 1991–92 (2–0)
680	1185	New Zealand	Eden Park, Auckland	Away	30 January 1992	Won by 168 runs	England in New Zealand, 1991–92 (2–0)
681	1187	New Zealand	Basin Reserve, Wellington	Away	6 February 1992	Match drawn	England in New Zealand, 1991–92 (2–0)
682	1189	Pakistan	Edgbaston, Birmingham	Home	4 June 1992	Match drawn	Pakistan in England, 1992 (1–2)
683	1190	Pakistan	Lord's, London	Home	18 June 1992	Lost by 2 wickets	Pakistan in England, 1992 (1–2)
684	1191	Pakistan	Old Trafford, Manchester	Home	2 July 1992	Match drawn	Pakistan in England, 1992 (1–2)
685	1192	Pakistan	Headingley, Leeds	Home	23 July 1992	Won by 6 wickets	Pakistan in England, 1992 (1–2)
686	1193	Pakistan	The Oval, London	Home	6 August 1992	Lost by 10 wickets	Pakistan in England, 1992 (1–2)
687	1211	India	Eden Gardens, Calcutta	Away	29 January 1993	Lost by 8 wickets	England in India, 1992–93 (0–3)
688	1213	India	M. A. Chidambaram Stadium, Madras	Away	11 February 1993	Lost by an innings and 22 runs	England in India, 1992–93 (0–3)
689	1214	India	Wankhede Stadium, Bombay	Away	19 February 1993	Lost by an innings and 15 runs	England in India, 1992–93 (0–3)
690	1219	Sri Lanka	Sinhalese Sports Club Ground, Colombo	Away	13 March 1993	Lost by 5 wickets	England in Sri Lanka, 1992–93 (0–1)
691	1223	Australia	Old Trafford, Manchester	Home	3 June 1993	Lost by 179 runs	1993 Ashes series (1–4)
692	1224	Australia	Lord's, London	Home	17 June 1993	Lost by an innings and 62 runs	1993 Ashes series (1–4)
693	1225	Australia	Trent Bridge, Nottingham	Home	1 July 1993	Match drawn	1993 Ashes series (1–4)
694	1227	Australia	Headingley, Leeds	Home	22 July 1993	Lost by an innings and 148 runs	1993 Ashes series (1–4)
695	1230	Australia	Edgbaston, Birmingham	Home	5 August 1993	Lost by 8 wickets	1993 Ashes series (1–4)
696	1231	Australia	The Oval, London	Home	19 August 1993	Won by 161 runs	1993 Ashes series (1–4)
697	1250	West Indies	Sabina Park, Kingston	Away	19 February 1994	Lost by 8 wickets	England in the West Indies, 1993–94 (1–3)
698	1254	West Indies	Bourda, Georgetown	Away	17 March 1994	Lost by an innings and 44 runs	England in the West Indies, 1993–94 (1–3)
699	1257	West Indies	Queen's Park Oval, Port of Spain	Away	25 March 1994	Lost by 147 runs	England in the West Indies, 1993–94 (1–3)
700	1258	West Indies	Kensington Oval, Bridgetown	Away	8 April 1994	Won by 208 runs	England in the West Indies, 1993–94 (1–3)
701	1259	West Indies	Antigua Recreation Ground, St John's	Away	16 April 1994	Match drawn	England in the West Indies, 1993–94 (1–3)
702	1260	New Zealand	Trent Bridge, Nottingham	Home	2 June 1994	Won by an innings and 90 runs	New Zealand in England, 1994 (1–0)
703	1261	New Zealand	Lord's, London	Home	16 June 1994	Match drawn	New Zealand in England, 1994 (1–0)
704	1262	New Zealand	Old Trafford, Manchester	Home	30 June 1994	Match drawn	New Zealand in England, 1994 (1–0)
705	1263	South Africa	Lord's, London	Home	21 July 1994	Lost by 356 runs	South Africa in England, 1994 (1–1)
706	1264	South Africa	Headingley, Leeds	Home	4 August 1994	Match drawn	South Africa in England, 1994 (1–1)
707	1266	South Africa	The Oval, London	Home	18 August 1994	Won by 8 wickets	South Africa in England, 1994 (1–1)
708	1275	Australia	The Gabba, Brisbane	Away	25 November 1994	Lost by 184 runs	1994–95 Ashes series (1–3)
709	1279	Australia	Melbourne Cricket Ground, Melbourne	Away	24 December 1994	Lost by 295 runs	1994–95 Ashes series (1–3)
710	1281	Australia	Sydney Cricket Ground, Sydney	Away	1 January 1995	Match drawn	1994–95 Ashes series (1–3)
711	1284	Australia	Adelaide Oval, Adelaide	Away	26 January 1995	Won by 106 runs	1994–95 Ashes series (1–3)
712	1287	Australia	WACA Ground, Perth	Away	3 February 1995	Lost by 329 runs	1994–95 Ashes series (1–3)
713	1298	West Indies	Headingley, Leeds	Home	8 June 1995	Lost by 9 wickets	West Indies in England, 1995 (2–2)
714	1299	West Indies	Lord's, London	Home	22 June 1995	Won by 72 runs	West Indies in England, 1995 (2–2)
715	1300	West Indies	Edgbaston, Birmingham	Home	6 July 1995	Lost by an innings and 64 runs	West Indies in England, 1995 (2–2)
716	1301	West Indies	Old Trafford, Manchester	Home	27 July 1995	Won by 6 wickets	West Indies in England, 1995 (2–2)
717	1302	West Indies	Trent Bridge, Nottingham	Home	10 August 1995	Match drawn	West Indies in England, 1995 (2–2)
718	1303	West Indies	The Oval, London	Home	24 August 1995	Match drawn	West Indies in England, 1995 (2–2)
719	1312	South Africa	Centurion Park, Centurion	Away	16 November 1995	Match drawn	England in South Africa, 1995–96 (0–1)
720	1315	South Africa	Wanderers Stadium, Johannesburg	Away	30 November 1995	Match drawn	England in South Africa, 1995–96 (0–1)
721	1318	South Africa	Kingsmead, Durban	Away	14 December 1995	Match drawn	England in South Africa, 1995–96 (0–1)
722	1320	South Africa	St George's Park, Port Elizabeth	Away	26 December 1995	Match drawn	England in South Africa, 1995–96 (0–1)
723	1321	South Africa	Newlands Cricket Ground, Cape Town	Away	2 January 1996	Lost by 10 wickets	England in South Africa, 1995–96 (0–1)
724	1327	India	Edgbaston, Birmingham	Home	6 June 1996	Won by 8 wickets	India in England, 1996 (1–0)
725	1328	India	Lord's, London	Home	20 June 1996	Match drawn	India in England, 1996 (1–0)
726	1329	India	Trent Bridge, Nottingham	Home	4 July 1996	Match drawn	India in England, 1996 (1–0)
727	1330	Pakistan	Lord's, London	Home	25 July 1996	Lost by 164 runs	Pakistan in England, 1996 (0–2)
728	1331	Pakistan	Headingley, Leeds	Home	8 August 1996	Match drawn	Pakistan in England, 1996 (0–2)
729	1332	Pakistan	The Oval, London	Home	22 August 1996	Lost by 9 wickets	Pakistan in England, 1996 (0–2)
730	1345	Zimbabwe	Bulawayo Athletic Club, Bulawayo	Away	18 December 1996	Match drawn	England in Zimbabwe, 1996–97 (0–0)
731	1348	Zimbabwe	Harare Sports Club, Harare	Away	26 December 1996	Match drawn	England in Zimbabwe, 1996–97 (0–0)
732	1351	New Zealand	Eden Park, Auckland	Away	24 January 1997	Match drawn	England in New Zealand, 1996–97 (2–0)
733	1354	New Zealand	Basin Reserve, Wellington	Away	6 February 1997	Won by an innings and 68 runs	England in New Zealand, 1996–97 (2–0)
734	1355	New Zealand	Lancaster Park, Christchurch	Away	14 February 1997	Won by 4 wickets	England in New Zealand, 1996–97 (2–0)
735	1368	Australia	Edgbaston, Birmingham	Home	5 June 1997	Won by 9 wickets	1997 Ashes series (2–3)
736	1370	Australia	Lord's, London	Home	19 June 1997	Match drawn	1997 Ashes series (2–3)
737	1372	Australia	Old Trafford, Manchester	Home	3 July 1997	Lost by 268 runs	1997 Ashes series (2–3)
738	1373	Australia	Headingley, Leeds	Home	24 July 1997	Lost by an innings and 61 runs	1997 Ashes series (2–3)
739	1375	Australia	Trent Bridge, Nottingham	Home	7 August 1997	Lost by 264 runs	1997 Ashes series (2–3)
740	1377	Australia	The Oval, London	Home	21 August 1997	Won by 19 runs	1997 Ashes series (2–3)
741	1396	West Indies	Sabina Park, Kingston	Away	29 January 1998	Match drawn	England in the West Indies, 1997–98 (1–3)
742	1398	West Indies	Queen's Park Oval, Port of Spain	Away	5 February 1998	Lost by 3 wickets	England in the West Indies, 1997–98 (1–3)
743	1399	West Indies	Queen's Park Oval, Port of Spain	Away	13 February 1998	Won by 3 wickets	England in the West Indies, 1997–98 (1–3)
744	1404	West Indies	Bourda, Georgetown	Away	27 February 1998	Lost by 242 runs	England in the West Indies, 1997–98 (1–3)
745	1407	West Indies	Kensington Oval, Bridgetown	Away	12 March 1998	Match drawn	England in the West Indies, 1997–98 (1–3)
746	1411	West Indies	Antigua Recreation Ground, St John's	Away	20 March 1998	Lost by an innings and 52 runs	England in the West Indies, 1997–98 (1–3)
747	1417	South Africa	Edgbaston, Birmingham	Home	4 June 1998	Match drawn	South Africa in England, 1998 (2–1)
748	1419	South Africa	Lord's, London	Home	18 June 1998	Lost by 10 wickets	South Africa in England, 1998 (2–1)
749	1420	South Africa	Old Trafford, Manchester	Home	2 July 1998	Match drawn	South Africa in England, 1998 (2–1)
750	1421	South Africa	Trent Bridge, Nottingham	Home	23 July 1998	Won by 8 wickets	South Africa in England, 1998 (2–1)
751	1422	South Africa	Headingley, Leeds	Home	6 August 1998	Won by 23 runs	South Africa in England, 1998 (2–1)
752	1423	Sri Lanka	The Oval, London	Home	27 August 1998	Lost by 10 wickets	Sri Lanka in England, 1998 (0–1)
753	1428	Australia	The Gabba, Brisbane	Away	20 November 1998	Match drawn	1998–99 Ashes series (1–3)
754	1431	Australia	WACA Ground, Perth	Away	28 November 1998	Lost by 7 wickets	1998–99 Ashes series (1–3)
755	1434	Australia	Adelaide Oval, Adelaide	Away	11 December 1998	Lost by 205 runs	1998–99 Ashes series (1–3)
756	1436	Australia	Melbourne Cricket Ground, Melbourne	Away	26 December 1998	Won by 12 runs	1998–99 Ashes series (1–3)
757	1439	Australia	Sydney Cricket Ground, Sydney	Away	2 January 1999	Lost by 98 runs	1998–99 Ashes series (1–3)
758	1455	New Zealand	Edgbaston, Birmingham	Home	1 July 1999	Won by 7 wickets	New Zealand in England, 1999 (1–2)
759	1456	New Zealand	Lord's, London	Home	22 July 1999	Lost by 9 wickets	New Zealand in England, 1999 (1–2)
760	1457	New Zealand	Old Trafford, Manchester	Home	5 August 1999	Match drawn	New Zealand in England, 1999 (1–2)
761	1458	New Zealand	The Oval, London	Home	19 August 1999	Lost by 83 runs	New Zealand in England, 1999 (1–2)
762	1471	South Africa	Wanderers Stadium, Johannesburg	Away	25 November 1999	Lost by an innings and 21 runs	England in South Africa, 1999–2000 (1–2)
763	1475	South Africa	St George's Park, Port Elizabeth	Away	9 December 1999	Match drawn	England in South Africa, 1999–2000 (1–2)
764	1480	South Africa	Kingsmead, Durban	Away	26 December 1999	Match drawn	England in South Africa, 1999–2000 (1–2)
765	1482	South Africa	Newlands Cricket Ground, Cape Town	Away	2 January 2000	Lost by an innings and 37 runs	England in South Africa, 1999–2000 (1–2)
766	1483	South Africa	Centurion Park, Centurion	Away	14 January 2000	Won by 2 wickets	England in South Africa, 1999–2000 (1–2)
767	1495	Zimbabwe	Lord's, London	Home	18 May 2000	Won by an innings and 209 runs	Zimbabwe in England, 2000 (1–0)
768	1498	Zimbabwe	Trent Bridge, Nottingham	Home	1 June 2000	Match drawn	Zimbabwe in England, 2000 (1–0)
769	1500	West Indies	Edgbaston, Birmingham	Home	15 June 2000	Lost by an innings and 93 runs	West Indies in England, 2000 (3–1)
770	1503	West Indies	Lord's, London	Home	29 June 2000	Won by 2 wickets	West Indies in England, 2000 (3–1)
771	1506	West Indies	Old Trafford, Manchester	Home	3 August 2000	Match drawn	West Indies in England, 2000 (3–1)
772	1508	West Indies	Headingley, Leeds	Home	17 August 2000	Won by an innings and 39 runs	West Indies in England, 2000 (3–1)
773	1509	West Indies	The Oval, London	Home	31 August 2000	Won by 158 runs	West Indies in England, 2000 (3–1)
774	1513	Pakistan	Gaddafi Stadium, Lahore	Away	15 November 2000	Match drawn	England in Pakistan, 2000–01 (1–0)
775	1518	Pakistan	Iqbal Stadium, Faisalabad	Away	29 November 2000	Match drawn	England in Pakistan, 2000–01 (1–0)
776	1521	Pakistan	National Stadium, Karachi	Away	7 December 2000	Won by 6 wickets	England in Pakistan, 2000–01 (1–0)
777	1530	Sri Lanka	Galle International Stadium, Galle	Away	22 February 2001	Lost by an innings and 28 runs	England in Sri Lanka, 2000–01 (2–1)
778	1532	Sri Lanka	Asgiriya Stadium, Kandy	Away	7 March 2001	Won by 3 wickets	England in Sri Lanka, 2000–01 (2–1)
779	1537	Sri Lanka	Sinhalese Sports Club Ground, Colombo	Away	15 March 2001	Won by 4 wickets	England in Sri Lanka, 2000–01 (2–1)
780	1546	Pakistan	Lord's, London	Home	17 May 2001	Won by an innings and 9 runs	Pakistan in England, 2001 (1–1)
781	1547	Pakistan	Old Trafford, Manchester	Home	31 May 2001	Lost by 108 runs	Pakistan in England, 2001 (1–1)
782	1550	Australia	Edgbaston, Birmingham	Home	5 July 2001	Lost by an innings and 118 runs	2001 Ashes series (1–4)
783	1552	Australia	Lord's, London	Home	19 July 2001	Lost by 8 wickets	2001 Ashes series (1–4)
784	1554	Australia	Trent Bridge, Nottingham	Home	2 August 2001	Lost by 7 wickets	2001 Ashes series (1–4)
785	1556	Australia	Headingley, Leeds	Home	16 August 2001	Won by 6 wickets	2001 Ashes series (1–4)
786	1558	Australia	The Oval, London	Home	23 August 2001	Lost by an innings and 25 runs	2001 Ashes series (1–4)
787	1574	India	Punjab Cricket Association Stadium, Mohali	Away	3 December 2001	Lost by 10 wickets	England in India, 2001–02 (0–1)
788	1575	India	Sardar Patel Stadium, Ahmedabad	Away	11 December 2001	Match drawn	England in India, 2001–02 (0–1)
789	1578	India	M. Chinnaswamy Stadium, Bangalore	Away	19 December 2001	Match drawn	England in India, 2001–02 (0–1)
790	1594	New Zealand	Lancaster Park, Christchurch	Away	13 March 2002	Won by 98 runs	England in New Zealand, 2001–02 (1–1)
791	1596	New Zealand	Basin Reserve, Wellington	Away	21 March 2002	Match drawn	England in New Zealand, 2001–02 (1–1)
792	1597	New Zealand	Eden Park, Auckland	Away	30 March 2002	Lost by 78 runs	England in New Zealand, 2001–02 (1–1)
793	1603	Sri Lanka	Lord's, London	Home	16 May 2002	Match drawn	Sri Lanka in England, 2002 (2–0)
794	1605	Sri Lanka	Edgbaston, Birmingham	Home	30 May 2002	Won by an innings and 111 runs	Sri Lanka in England, 2002 (2–0)
795	1606	Sri Lanka	Old Trafford, Manchester	Home	13 June 2002	Won by 10 wickets	Sri Lanka in England, 2002 (2–0)
796	1610	India	Lord's, London	Home	25 July 2002	Won by 170 runs	India in England, 2002 (1–1)
797	1612	India	Trent Bridge, Nottingham	Home	8 August 2002	Match drawn	India in England, 2002 (1–1)
798	1613	India	Headingley, Leeds	Home	22 August 2002	Lost by an innings and 46 runs	India in England, 2002 (1–1)
799	1614	India	The Oval, London	Home	5 September 2002	Match drawn	India in England, 2002 (1–1)
800	1623	Australia	The Gabba, Brisbane	Away	7 November 2002	Lost by 384 runs	2002–03 Ashes series (1–4)
801	1628	Australia	Adelaide Oval, Adelaide	Away	21 November 2002	Lost by an innings and 51 runs	2002–03 Ashes series (1–4)
802	1629	Australia	WACA Ground, Perth	Away	29 November 2002	Lost by an innings and 48 runs	2002–03 Ashes series (1–4)
803	1634	Australia	Melbourne Cricket Ground, Melbourne	Away	26 December 2002	Lost by 5 wickets	2002–03 Ashes series (1–4)
804	1636	Australia	Sydney Cricket Ground, Sydney	Away	2 January 2003	Won by 225 runs	2002–03 Ashes series (1–4)
805	1646	Zimbabwe	Lord's, London	Home	22 May 2003	Won by an innings and 92 runs	Zimbabwe in England, 2003 (2–0)
806	1647	Zimbabwe	Riverside Ground, Chester-le-Street	Home	5 June 2003	Won by an innings and 69 runs	Zimbabwe in England, 2003 (2–0)
807	1651	South Africa	Edgbaston, Birmingham	Home	24 July 2003	Match drawn	South Africa in England, 2003 (2–2)
808	1653	South Africa	Lord's, London	Home	31 July 2003	Lost by an innings and 92 runs	South Africa in England, 2003 (2–2)
809	1654	South Africa	Trent Bridge, Nottingham	Home	14 August 2003	Won by 70 runs	South Africa in England, 2003 (2–2)
810	1656	South Africa	Headingley, Leeds	Home	21 August 2003	Lost by 191 runs	South Africa in England, 2003 (2–2)
811	1659	South Africa	The Oval, London	Home	4 September 2003	Won by 9 wickets	South Africa in England, 2003 (2–2)
812	1665	Bangladesh	Sher-e-Bangla Cricket Stadium, Dhaka	Away	21 October 2003	Won by 7 wickets	England in Bangladesh, 2003–04 (2–0)
813	1667	Bangladesh	M. A. Aziz Stadium, Chittagong	Away	29 October 2003	Won by 329 runs	England in Bangladesh, 2003–04 (2–0)
814	1670	Sri Lanka	Galle International Stadium, Galle	Away	2 December 2003	Match drawn	England in Sri Lanka, 2003–04 (0–1)
815	1672	Sri Lanka	Asgiriya Stadium, Kandy	Away	10 December 2003	Match drawn	England in Sri Lanka, 2003–04 (0–1)
816	1675	Sri Lanka	Sinhalese Sports Club Ground, Colombo	Away	18 December 2003	Lost by an innings and 215 runs	England in Sri Lanka, 2003–04 (0–1)
817	1687	West Indies	Sabina Park, Kingston	Away	11 March 2004	Won by 10 wickets	England in the West Indies, 2003–04 (3–0)
818	1690	West Indies	Queen's Park Oval, Port of Spain	Away	19 March 2004	Won by 7 wickets	England in the West Indies, 2003–04 (3–0)
819	1694	West Indies	Kensington Oval, Bridgetown	Away	1 April 2004	Won by 8 wickets	England in the West Indies, 2003–04 (3–0)
820	1696	West Indies	Antigua Recreation Ground, St John's	Away	10 April 2004	Match drawn	England in the West Indies, 2003–04 (3–0)
821	1700	New Zealand	Lord's, London	Home	20 May 2004	Won by 7 wickets	New Zealand in England in 2004 (3–0)
822	1702	New Zealand	Headingley, Leeds	Home	3 June 2004	Won by 9 wickets	New Zealand in England in 2004 (3–0)
823	1704	New Zealand	Trent Bridge, Nottingham	Home	10 June 2004	Won by 4 wickets	New Zealand in England in 2004 (3–0)
824	1707	West Indies	Lord's, London	Home	22 July 2004	Won by 210 runs	West Indies in England, 2004 (4–0)
825	1708	West Indies	Edgbaston, Birmingham	Home	29 July 2004	Won by 256 runs	West Indies in England, 2004 (4–0)
826	1711	West Indies	Old Trafford, Manchester	Home	12 August 2004	Won by 7 wickets	West Indies in England, 2004 (4–0)
827	1712	West Indies	The Oval, London	Home	19 August 2004	Won by 10 wickets	West Indies in England, 2004 (4–0)
828	1728	South Africa	St George's Park, Port Elizabeth	Away	17 December 2004	Won by 7 wickets	England in South Africa, 2004–05 (2–1) (Note: The 2004–05 series between England and South Africa concluded in 2005; the final three results are listed at England cricket team Test results (2005–2019).)
829	1730	South Africa	Kingsmead, Durban	Away	26 December 2004	Match drawn	England in South Africa, 2004–05 (2–1)

== Summary ==
Team	Total matches					Home matches					Away matches				
Team	Mat	Won	Lost	Draw	W/L	Mat	Won	Lost	Draw	W/L	Mat	Won	Lost	Draw	W/L
Australia	37	7	24	6	0.291	17	4	11	2	0.363	20	3	13	4	0.230
Bangladesh	2	2	0	0	–	0	0	0	0	–	2	2	0	0	–
India	16	3	5	8	0.600	10	3	1	6	3.000	6	0	4	2	0.000
New Zealand	22	11	3	8	3.666	13	6	2	5	3.000	9	5	1	3	5.000
Pakistan	13	3	5	5	0.600	10	2	5	3	0.400	3	1	0	2	–
South Africa	25	7	7	11	1.000	13	5	4	4	1.250	12	2	3	7	0.666
Sri Lanka	12	5	4	3	1.250	5	3	1	1	3.000	7	2	3	2	0.666
West Indies	39	17	13	9	1.307	20	11	5	4	2.200	19	6	8	5	0.750
Zimbabwe	6	3	0	3	–	4	3	0	1	–	2	0	0	2	0.000
Total	172	58	61	53	0.950	92	37	29	26	1.275	80	21	32	27	0.656
