= David Lloyd (cricketer) =

English cricketer, coach, & commentator (born 1947)

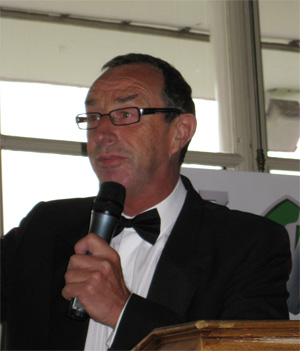
- Lloyd in April 2009

Personal information
- Born: 18 March 1947 (age 79); Accrington, Lancashire, England
- Nickname: Bumble
- Batting: Left-handed
- Bowling: Slow left arm orthodox
- Role: All-rounder
- Relatives: Graham Lloyd (son)

International information
- National side: England
- Test debut (cap 460): 20 June 1974 v India
- Last Test: 30 January 1975 v Australia
- ODI debut (cap 28): 7 September 1973 v West Indies
- Last ODI: 29 May 1980 v West Indies

Domestic team information
- Years: Team
- 1965–1983: Lancashire

Umpiring information
- FC umpired: 35 (1985–1987)
- LA umpired: 27 (1986–1987)

Career statistics
Competition	Test	ODI	FC	LA
Matches	9	8	407	288
Runs scored	552	285	19,269	7,761
Batting average	42.46	40.71	33.33	32.74
100s/50s	1/0	1/0	38/93	7/44
Top score	214*	116*	214*	121*
Balls bowled	24	12	15,598	1,251
Wickets	0	1	237	39
Bowling average	–	3.00	30.26	22.89
5 wickets in innings	–	0	5	0
10 wickets in match	–	0	1	0
Best bowling	–	1/3	7/38	4/17
Catches/stumpings	11/–	3/–	334/–	89/–
- Source: ESPNcricinfo, 25 July 2020

David Lloyd (born 18 March 1947) is an English former cricket player, umpire, coach and commentator, who played county cricket for Lancashire County Cricket Club and Test and One Day International cricket for the English cricket team. He also played semi-professional football for Accrington Stanley. He is known through the cricketing world as Bumble due to the ostensible similarity between his facial profile and those of the Bumblies, characters from Michael Bentine's children's television programmes.

A left-handed batsman and left-arm spin bowler, he played nine Tests, with a highest score of 214 not out, and eight One Day International matches. In first-class cricket he was a successful all-rounder, scoring a career aggregate of more than 19,000 runs and taking 237 wickets. He captained his county from 1973 to 1977. Following his retirement as a player, he became a first-class umpire, and subsequently Lancashire and England cricket coach, resigning the latter post following the 1999 Cricket World Cup. He then became a renowned cricket commentator for Test Match Special, and later Sky Sports. He is also an author, journalist and columnist. In December 2021, Lloyd announced his retirement from full-time commentating. In 2022, he signed a contract with Lancashire's in-house channel LancsTV to commentate on every non-televised Vitality Blast home match and select County Championship fixtures.

== Early and personal life ==
Lloyd was born in Accrington, Lancashire, in March 1947, and was educated at Accrington Secondary Technical School. His son, Graham Lloyd, was born in 1969; he went on to play six ODI matches for England, and enjoyed a successful career for Lancashire, as well as with his father for Cumberland and Accrington. A second son, Ben Lloyd, also played Lancashire League cricket between 1999 and 2000, making seven appearances for Church. In 2018, Lloyd was given the freedom of Accrington.

== Playing career ==
Lloyd had an extensive playing career, with 407 first-class matches and 288 one day games. He scored nearly 27,000 runs and took 276 wickets in his career for Lancashire and England, and took 423 catches. His batting average of 33.33 in all first-class cricket, and bowling average of 30.26, illustrate his capability as a successful all-rounder. He scored over 1,000 runs in a season on ten occasions, and scored hundreds in all three major domestic competitions. His total career spanned twenty years from 1965 to 1985, and he also played lower level cricket for Cumberland as well as league and club cricket in Accrington, for whom he continued to appear for until 2009 alongside his son. He scored the winning runs for Accrington in the final game of the 2009 season ensuring they won their seventh Lancashire League title. It was in the Lancashire League initially that Lloyd found enough success to attract the attention of the county selectors, playing 33 matches for Accrington between 28 July 1962 and his first-class debut.

=== Lancashire ===
Lloyd played his first first-class match for Lancashire on 12 June 1965 in a County Championship match against Middlesex at Old Trafford cricket ground in Manchester. Lloyd batted at number seven, and made a pair – scores of zero in both innings – as Middlesex took a nine wicket victory. He did, however, take two wickets. He went on to struggle in his first season with the bat, playing 13 matches and scoring only 262 runs at 14.55 with a high score of 44. He did find success with the ball, however, taking 21 wickets at 31.33.

Lloyd made his debut in one day matches on 22 June 1966 – the only one day match he would play that season. It was a Gillette cup quarter-final against Somerset at Taunton cricket ground. He failed to make an impression: batting at six Lloyd was dismissed without scoring, and was not called on to bowl. He did, however, enjoy greater success with the bat in first-class cricket – scoring 588 runs from 25 matches at 21.77, including two half-centuries and a best of 77. He also took 32 wickets at 24.87, the highest wicket tally of his career. 1967 saw similar returns: 14 matches yielding 316 runs at 21.06 including one half-century score of 52*, as well as a successful bowling season with 21 wickets at 21.14 and the second five-wicket haul of his career.

1968 saw Lloyd score his first century for Lancashire, against Cambridge University on 8 June. He scored 148 not out in a rain-affected draw. Lloyd would later state to The Sunday Times that this was the moment when he realised he wanted to be a cricketer. He went on to score 935 runs from 23 matches that season, largely batting up the order. His bowling suffered, however, taking only one wicket at 93.00.

Lloyd became a regular one-day player for Lancashire in 1969, playing 16 matches that year and scoring 342 runs at 22.80. Lancashire did not use Lloyd's bowling in the one day games that year, though he did take four first-class wickets at 17.50, and continued to improve with the bat, scoring his second century, 102*, and reaching 1,238 runs from 27 matches at 31.74 – the first time he had topped 1,000 runs in a season.

Lloyd collected three consecutive winner's medals for the Gillette Cup in 1970, 1971 and 1972 following finals victories over Sussex, Kent and Warwickshire. He scored over 1,000 runs in each of these seasons, and took 33 wickets throughout. 1972 saw 12 of these wickets taken at 28.25, and 1,510 runs at 47.18, including six centuries, making that year Lloyd's most successful season. He struggled in the one day games, however scoring only 290 runs at 16.11, nevertheless he was awarded the captaincy for 1973. The captaincy did nothing to affect his form, scoring 1,405 first-class runs that season at 40.14, including three centuries – one of which was a career best 195. He also took 31 wickets at 28.28. He played 24 one day matches, scoring 538 runs at 33.63 including a career best 113.

Lloyd returned from Australia in 1975 following injury, and led Lancashire to their fourth Gillette title of the 1970s.

Lloyd stepped down from the Lancashire captaincy in 1977, and was awarded a benefit year for 1978 which saw a then-record £40,171 raised.

=== England ===
Lloyd made his England ODI debut on 7 September 1973 at The Oval, London against the West Indies under the captaincy of Mike Denness. In this 55-over match, England were reduced to 189/9, Lloyd making only eight before being run out. The West Indies reached the target from 42.2 overs, for the loss of only two wickets. He was nevertheless called up to the Test squad for the second Test against India on 20 June 1974 at Lord's. Opening the batting in place of Geoffrey Boycott, Lloyd scored 46 as England reached 629 all out, thanks largely to 188 from Dennis Amiss, 118 from Denness, and 106 from Tony Greig. India made 302 in their first innings reply, Lloyd bowling only two overs for four runs. Following on, India were dismantled by Geoff Arnold (four wickets) and Chris Old (five wickets), falling to 42 all out and giving England victory by an innings and 285 runs.

Lloyd kept his place for the third Test against India at Edgbaston on 4 July. Batting first, and with the first day lost to rain, India were dismissed for 165 and by the end of day two, England were 117/0, with both Amiss and Lloyd not out with half-centuries. The next day, Amiss was dismissed for 79. However, in partnership with Denness (100) and Keith Fletcher (51*), Lloyd went on to score 214* from 396 balls. He hit 17 fours in his 448-minute innings, helping England to 459/2 declared. India were dismissed for 216, giving England another innings victory and the series 3–0. Lloyd thus ended his first Test series with a 260.00 Test batting average. He then went on to face India in two ODI matches at Headingley and The Oval on 13 and 15 July 1974. In the first, he made 34 from 63 balls as England won by four wickets, and in the second he scored 39 from 81 as England won by six wickets.

Lloyd then faced Pakistan at Headingley on 25 July and Lord's on 8 August, making 48, nine, 23 and 12* as both matches ended in draws. England then met Pakistan at the Kennington Oval on 22 August for the third Test, where Pakistan reached 600/7 declared in the first innings thanks to a knock of 240 from Zaheer Abbas. In reply, Amiss hit 183 and Fletcher scored 122, however Lloyd only managed four in the first innings, and Pakistan could only make 94/4 before the match ended in a draw. Lloyd went on to play both ODI matches, scoring 116* in the first match from 159 balls, though in a losing cause and followed up with four in the second match.

Lloyd then travelled to Australia to face the home team for the 1974–75 Ashes series. The first three Test matches took place in December. Lloyd didn't play the First Test in Brisbane. During the second, on 13 December at Perth, he scored 49 and 35 as Australia took a nine wicket victory. On 26 December they met again at Melbourne cricket ground, for a drawn match where Lloyd score 14 and 44. The following day, England and Australia played an ODI match at Melbourne. Lloyd made 49 from 95 balls as England won by three wickets. Returning to the Test matches, Lloyd scored 19 and 26 against the home team at the SCG on 4 January 1975, followed by four and five at Adelaide on 25 January. Both matches saw heavy defeats for England. Lloyd's Test average had now dropped down into the 40s, and following a neck injury which forced him to return home, he did not play Test cricket again. He had averaged only 24.50 from the four Test matches, scoring only 196 runs in all from eight innings, and John Arlott wrote in 1984 that, "in a side routed by the 'heart-line' attack of Lillee and Thomson, [Lloyd] was effectively shocked and shattered out of Test cricket."

He was, however, recalled for two ODI matches in 1978 and 1980. The first, on 26 May 1978, was against Pakistan at The Oval, where he scored 34 from 61 balls, and the second and final match was on 28 May 1980 against the West Indies at Headingley. Here, he faced only eight balls batting down the order, scoring one run before breaking his arm, the tourists going on to win by 24 runs.

== Accrington Stanley ==
Lloyd has been a lifelong supporter of Accrington Stanley F.C., and played for them during the 1960s. Lloyd has maintained links with the club after his playing career ended, and in May 2009 he voiced his wishes to become involved in the club from the point of view of investment. He stated to the Accrington Observer that "I love football and always have. I was talking to Eric Whalley about it the other day and he said he wanted to sell and I wish I could afford to buy the club off him. I can't do that but I would like some involvement and perhaps raise the profile of Accrington Stanley. The town needs a football club – and I want to help to make sure they have one." In March 2021, Lloyd had a street named after him, close to the football and cricket clubs.

== Later career ==
=== Umpiring ===
I have been incredibly lucky to have been involved in all aspects of cricket. Whatever I am doing at the time is the best thing. I do enjoy watching other coaches at work and I think we have a gem in Peter Moores. Of course you are so dependent on the performances of the players for results. Umpiring was such a rewarding job and I hope I fight the umpires' corner in commentary.

— Lloyd, in interview with Matt Gatward, The Independent, 2008

Following his retirement in 1983, Lloyd umpired first-class and List-A matches from 1985 to 1987. His first match was on 20 April 1985 between Cambridge University and Essex in Cambridge, and his last was on 9 September 1987 between Nottinghamshire and Glamorgan at Trent Bridge. In all, he oversaw 35 first-class matches and 27 List-A games, including tour matches for India and New Zealand.

=== Coaching ===
==== Lancashire ====
Lloyd became Lancashire head coach in 1993, and went on to guide Lancashire to their third Benson and Hedges Cup title.

In 1995, Lloyd came into conflict with Dermot Reeve, then coach of Somerset, while in the Old Trafford committee room. He stated, according to Reeve in his biography Winning Ways: "I don't like you Reeve. I never have liked you. You get right up my nose and if you come anywhere near me, I'll rearrange yours."

==== England ====
Lloyd became England's coach in 1996, and saw England to Test series victories against India, New Zealand and South Africa, as well as ODI victories against India, Pakistan and the West Indies. He worked to expand England's support structure, including "a fitness consultant and a media relations officer, as well as a number of specialist coaches."

In the winter tour to Zimbabwe, after two close draws, Lloyd generated controversy with his post-match statements. Speaking after the first Test in Bulawayo, which ended as a draw with the scores level, he stated "We murdered them. We got on top and steamrollered them. We have flipping hammered them. One more ball and we'd have walked it. We murdered them and they know it. To work so hard and get so close, there is no praise too high. We have had some stick off your lads. We flipping hammered them." The comments were not appreciated by Zimbabwe fans, with one banner in the crowd reading "Wanted. David Lloyd. For Murder of Zim Cricket Team. Last seen with his finger up his nose talking complete bollocks. He knows it and we know it."

With his contract extended to 1997, he oversaw a 3–0 victory over Australia in the Texaco Trophy, and victory in the first Test of the 1997 Ashes series at Edgbaston, however three of the next four Tests were victories for Australia, allowing them to retain the Ashes despite England taking victory in the sixth and final match. Prior to the winter tour of the West Indies, Lloyd played a "leading part" in persuading Mike Atherton to carry on as captain. Despite defeat in the Caribbean and Atherton's eventual retirement, Lloyd's contract was renewed again for 1998.

With Lloyd as coach, in the summer of 1998 England beat South Africa 2-1, their first victory in a five-match Test series since 1986/87. However, in September 1998, following the tour of England by Sri Lanka Lloyd received criticism from both the England and Wales Cricket Board and the Sri Lanka Cricket Board for calling Sri Lanka's Muttiah Muralitharan a "chucker", as well as for frequent outbursts following poor England performances. He initially announced that he was stepping down from the coaching role during the 1998–99 Ashes series in Australia following the appointment of Graham Gooch as tour manager, however in March 1999 he stated that that year's Cricket World Cup would signal his retirement after talks with the ECB revealed that his contract was not to be renewed. England performed poorly at the tournament, failing to advance from the group stages. Afterwards, Lloyd immediately joined Sky Sports as a commentator.

The ECB Chairman Lord MacLaurin reported to the media that "We owe David a huge debt for the job he has done as England coach since taking over the role in 1996. During his time in the job, David has introduced many innovations that mean we are now world leaders in several aspects of our approach to the game at international level. It would be a fitting send-off for him if we could lift the World Cup for the first time this summer." Meanwhile, ECB Chief Executive Tim Lamb stated "David has done a magnificent job for England, including delivering our first five Test series victory for 12 years. For the moment nothing is more important than a successful World Cup campaign, and I know that David will give his all in achieving this." Lloyd also commented that "I've had a tremendous time with the England side and I'm looking forward to completing my tenure with a successful and enjoyable World Cup campaign. It was important for me to have a clear picture of what my future holds. Now that the matter is settled this means the team can focus exclusively on the World Cup." Alec Stewart spoke for the team, stating "It's disappointing news but it's been a real pleasure to work with 'Bumble', a coach who is thorough, loyal to his players and completely professional. He has brought a real sense of passion to the job of England coach and it would be great to reward him with the World Cup as a final vote of thanks from the players for all he has done for us."

== Commentating ==
Lloyd was a regular Sky Sports commentator from 1999 to 2021. He was a regular on coverage of England's Test and one-day international cricket, but it is as the voice of Twenty20 cricket, since its launch in 2003, that he has become particularly known, with his excitable style and catchphrases such as "Start the Car!", the title of his second autobiography. However, he has admitted he sees the game as "a form of entertainment using cricket equipment" rather than real cricket. Lloyd often makes reference to songs and lyrics by the band Half Man Half Biscuit in commentaries, often completely lost on other commentators working with him. Lloyd was also part of Talksport's live coverage of the 2017 ICC Champions Trophy.

Lloyd retired from commentating for Sky Sports after controversy about comments he was alleged to have made about Asian players. Azeem Rafiq told a Digital, Culture, Media and Sport select committee that Lloyd had sent messages saying that "Asian players don't go in" clubhouses and that "getting subs out of Asian players is like getting blood out of stone"; Lloyd later said he had "made some comments about the Asian cricket community", adding that he "deeply regret[ted]" his actions and apologised to Rafiq and to the Asian cricket community.

Lloyd has commentated for the Indian Premier League (IPL) in the past, and remarked in 2015 that England and Wales Cricket Board (ECB) should make a window for English players to participate in the tournament. However, in recent years, he has not been selected on the IPL commentary panel and been critical of IPL and BCCI. In 2022, Lloyd stated that IPL is "disrupting the traditional international programme" and "benefitting already rich people." Lloyd would make a one-off return to Sky Sports for to commentate on finals day of the 2025 T20 Blast.

== Books ==
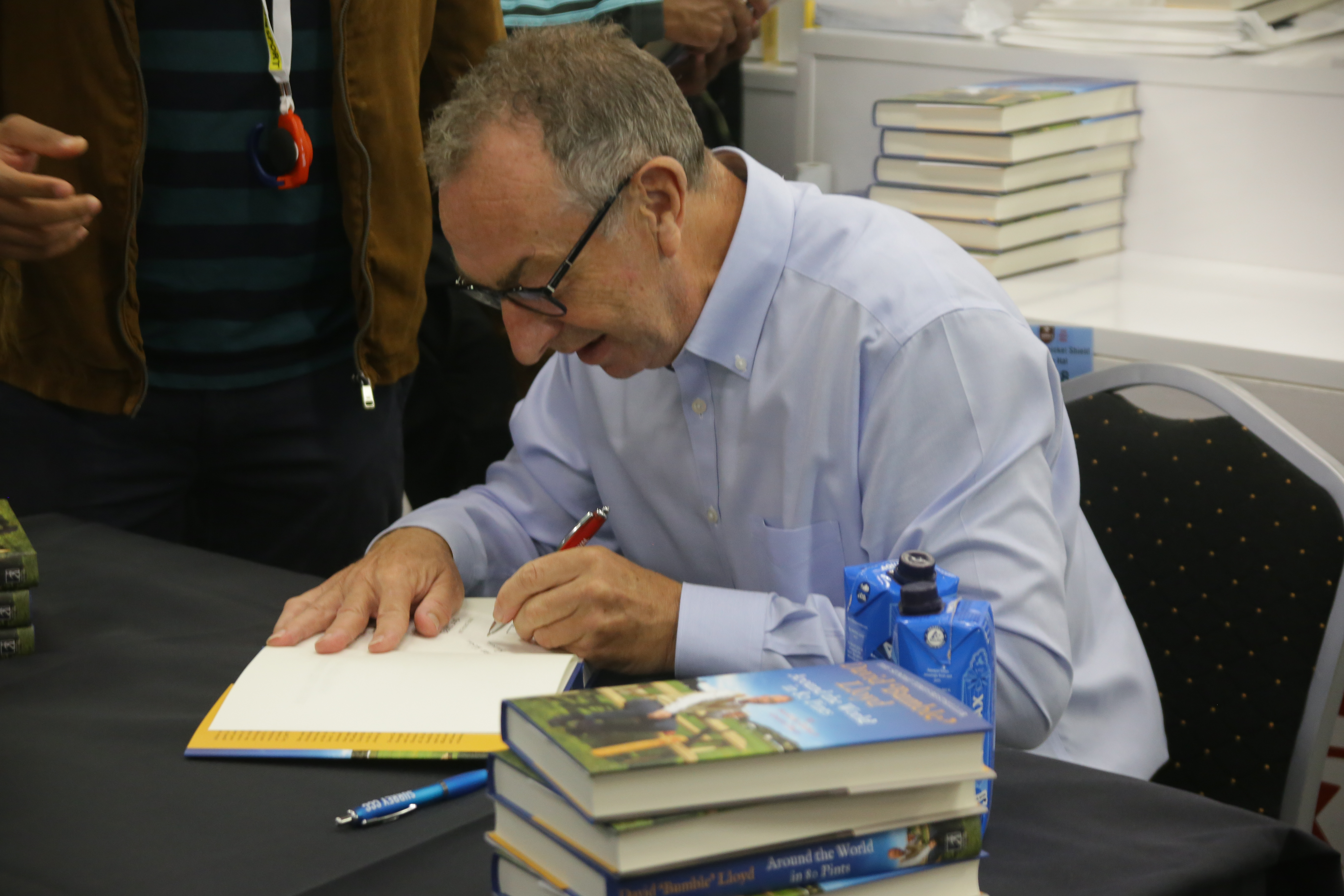
David Lloyd signing books at The Oval Sept 2018

In 2000, Lloyd published his autobiography, Anything but Murder, published by HarperCollins. The book received criticism on 15 May 2000, from former England batsman Graham Thorpe who reacted to Lloyd's criticism of him and his influence on the team at a moment when Thorpe had been left out of a match against Zimbabwe. Lloyd also criticised Nasser Hussain and Andy Caddick; Hussain as poor in his preparation for Test matches, and Caddick as insecure about his cricket. Lloyd later stated that he had "been taken a little bit by surprise by the criticism of the reference to players."

He has also published: Start the Car (2010), The Ashes According to Bumble (2013), Last in the Tin Bath: The Autobiography (2016), Around the World in 80 Pints (2019) and Simply the Best (2020).
