= 1998 Emirates Triangular Tournament =

Cricket tri-series

Emirates Triangular Tournament
- Part of the Sri Lankan cricket team in England in 1998 and the South African cricket team in England in 1998
- Date: August 14 – August 20, 1998
- Location: England
- Result: Won by Sri Lanka
- Player of the series: Marvan Atapattu
Teams
England	South Africa	Sri Lanka
Captains
Alec Stewart	Hansie Cronje	Arjuna Ranatunga
Most runs
Knight (370) Hick (328) Atherton (128)	Symcox (218); Cullinan (144); Rhodes (138)	Atapattu (356); Kaluwitharana (206); Ranatunga (184)
Most wickets
Gough (16) Mullaly (8) Croft (8)	Pollock (10); Cronje (8); Donald (8)	Muralitharan (12); Wickramasinghe (10); Perera (10)

The Emirates Triangular Tournament was a One-day International cricket tri-series involving touring nations Sri Lanka and South Africa against each other and hosts England, in the 1998 international season which was seen as a prelude for the 1999 Cricket World Cup also hosted by England. Sri Lanka won the tournament by defeating England in the final, thanks to an unbeaten 132 by player of the tournament Marvan Atapattu.

These matches were the first official One-day Internationals played in England in coloured clothing, with England wearing light blue, South Africa in green and Sri Lanka in dark blue.

== Group Stage table ==
Pos	Team	P	W	L	NR	T	Points	NRR
1	England	2	1	1	0	0	2	+0.220
2	Sri Lanka	2	1	1	0	0	2	+0.210
3	South Africa	2	1	1	0	0	2	-0.430

	ENG	SRI	RSA
England	(N/A)	W 36 runs	L 14 runs
Sri Lanka	L 36 runs	(N/A)	W 57 runs
South Africa	W 14 runs	L 57 runs	(N/A)

=== Table key ===
P = Games played
W = Games won
L = Games lost
NR = Games with no result
T = Games tied
NRR = Net run rate

=== Points system ===
Won = 2 points
Lost = 0 points
Tie or No result = 1 point
Standard net run rate rules applied.

=== Position deciders ===
The deciding factors, in order, on table position were:

1. Total points
2. Head-to-head result
3. Net run rate

== Group Stage matches ==
=== Match 1: South Africa v Sri Lanka ===
August 14
(scorecard)

Sri Lanka; 258 (47.5 overs)	v	South Africa; 201 (49 overs)
Arjuna Ranatunga 58 (91); Shaun Pollock 3/54 (8.5 overs)		Pat Symcox 58 (87); Jonty Rhodes 54 (49); Pramodya Wickramasinghe 3/20 (7 overs); Kumar Dharmasena 3/41 (10 overs)

Sri Lanka won by 57 runs
Trent Bridge, Nottingham, England
Umpires: Barry Dudleston (ENG) and Peter Willey (ENG)
Player of the match: Pramodya Wickramasinghe (SRI)

=== Match 2: England v Sri Lanka ===
August 16
(scorecard)

England; 247 (49.3 overs)	v	Sri Lanka; 211 (49.3 overs)
Graeme Hick 86 (97); Alec Stewart 51 (67); Sanath Jayasuriya 3/36 (10 overs)		Darren Gough 3/51 (10 overs)

England won by 36 runs
Lord's Cricket Ground, London, England
Umpires: Mervyn Kitchen (ENG) and Ken Palmer (ENG)
Player of the match: Graeme Hick (ENG)

=== Match 3: England v South Africa ===
August 18
(scorecard)

South Africa; 244/7 (50 overs)	v	England; 230 (48.5 overs)
Pat Symcox 51 (39); Darren Gough 3/43 (10 overs)		Nick Knight 74 (114); Graeme Hick 64 (72)

South Africa won by 14 runs
Edgbaston Cricket Ground, Birmingham, England
Umpires: John Holder (WIN) and George Sharp (ENG)
Player of the match: Pat Symcox (RSA)

Because England and Sri Lanka had the best run rates, they were ranked as the top two teams. England beat Sri Lanka and finished top of the group. South Africa's run rate meant they missed out on the final, despite having beaten England, and that a better run rate than Sri Lanka would have put them top of the table.

== Final ==
August 20
Scorecard

England; 256/8 (50 overs)	v	Sri Lanka; 260/5 (47.1 overs)
Nick Knight 94 (136); Muttiah Muralitharan 5/34 (10 overs)		Marvan Atapattu 132* (151); Darren Gough 2/50 (10 overs)

Sri Lanka won by 5 wickets
Lord's Cricket Ground, London, England
Umpires: David Constant (Eng) and David Shepherd (Eng)
Player of the match: Muttiah Muralitharan (SL)

- Alec Stewart (Eng) reached 3,000 runs in ODIs.
- Muttiah Muralitharan (SL) surpassed Joel Garner (WI) for best bowling figures at this venue (5/34).

Marvan Atapattu was named player of the tournament for his 356 run contribution to the victorious Sri Lankan side.

== Sources ==
- CricketArchive
  - CricketArchive: ODI series averages
- Cricinfo

== See also ==
- Sri Lankan cricket team in England in 1998
- South African cricket team in England in 1998
