= Chris Silverwood =

English cricketer & coach (born 1975)

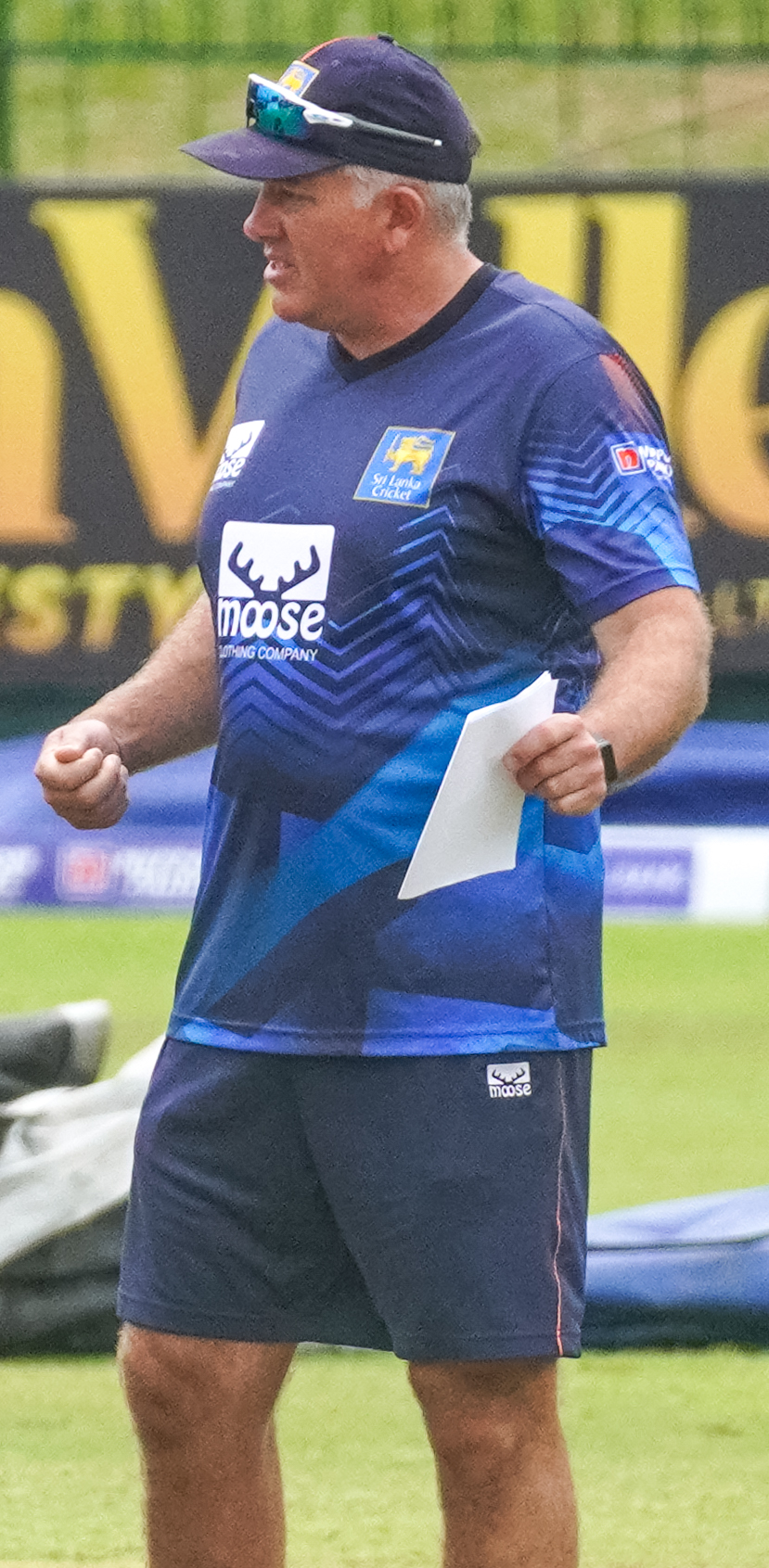
- Silverwood in 2023

Personal information
- Full name: Christopher Eric Wilfred Silverwood
- Born: 5 March 1975 (age 51); Pontefract, Yorkshire, England
- Nickname: Spoons, Silvers, Chubby
- Height: 6 ft 1 in (1.85 m)
- Batting: Right-handed
- Bowling: Right-arm fast-medium
- Role: Bowler

International information
- National side: England (1996–2003)
- Test debut (cap 583): 18 December 1996 v Zimbabwe
- Last Test: 29 November 2002 v Australia
- ODI debut (cap 144): 15 December 1996 v Zimbabwe
- Last ODI: 13 October 2001 v Zimbabwe

Domestic team information
- Years: Team
- 1993–2006: Yorkshire
- 2006–2009: Middlesex
- 2009: Mashonaland Eagles

Head coaching information
- Years: Team
- 2016–2018: Essex
- 2019–2022: England
- 2022–2024: Sri Lanka
- 2025–: Essex

Career statistics
Competition	Test	ODI	FC	LA
Matches	6	7	184	202
Runs scored	29	17	3,075	1,046
Batting average	7.25	4.25	15.85	13.58
100s/50s	0/0	0/0	–/9	–/4
Top score	10	12	80	61
Balls bowled	828	306	29,917	9,040
Wickets	11	6	577	259
Bowling average	40.36	40.66	27.41	25.05
5 wickets in innings	1	0	25	1
10 wickets in match	0	0	1	0
Best bowling	5/91	3/43	7/93	5/28
Catches/stumpings	2/–	0/–	43/–	32/–
- Source: Cricinfo, 1 January 2006

Christopher Eric Wilfred Silverwood (born 5 March 1975) is an English former international cricketer and coach. He is a former head coach of the Sri Lanka Cricket Team and previously the England Cricket Team.

== Early life and domestic playing career ==
Born in Pontefract, West Yorkshire, Silverwood was educated at Garforth Comprehensive School, and as a right-arm fast bowler, made his debut for Yorkshire County Cricket Club in 1993. He played for his native county for thirteen years, and was one of a battery of fast bowlers which the county produced in the late 1990s. With the club he won the County Championship in 2001 and the C&G (Friends Provident Trophy) in 2002. Former England bowling coach Bob Cottam once said he was faster than Allan Donald, and he possessed a lively outswinger and hostile bouncer when the conditions suited. He was also known for his stamina, and was noted for his ability to maintain his pace when returning for spells late in the day.

He signed for Middlesex for the 2006 season after playing only six games for Yorkshire in the 2005 season, having left by mutual consent after sustaining a series of injuries. He had a good first season with Middlesex, taking 63 first-class wickets, but struggled with injuries thereafter, leaving the club in 2009.

In 2009 he signed a contract with Harare-based franchise Mashonaland Eagles as player-coach, making his debut against Matabeleland Tuskers.

By the end of his career, the six-foot one inch paceman had taken 577 first-class wickets in 184 matches at an average of 27.41, with a best of 7 for 93 and 259 List A one day wickets at 25.05 with a best of 5 for 28. Usually a tail-end batsman he was occasionally used as a pinch hitter in one day games.

Silverwood won the NBC Denis Compton Award in 1996.

== Internationals ==
Silverwood was selected for the England tours of Zimbabwe and New Zealand in 1996–97. He made his international debut in the first One Day International (ODI) against Zimbabwe on 15 December, with Zimbabwe winning by two wickets. Silverwood followed this with his Test debut in the first Test, a match which England drew with the scores level at the end of the match. He took four wickets, but was not selected for the second Test, though he did play in the remaining ODIs against Zimbabwe as well as the final two ODIs of the New Zealand leg of the trip. In May 1997, Silverwood made his only home international appearance when he played the third ODI against Australia.

His next international appearances did not come until 1999, when he played four Tests of the 1999–2000 tour of South Africa. Silverwood struggled, with the ball not moving, taking 7 wickets at an average of just below 50.

He made a final Test appearance in the 2002–03 Ashes series in Australia, finishing his international career with a total of six Tests and seven ODIs.

== Coaching career ==
=== Essex ===
In 2010, Silverwood joined Essex as bowling coach, and was promoted to the head coach position ahead of the 2016 season. His first year in the role saw Essex promoted to the First Division of the County Championship, followed by them winning the competition in 2017.

=== England ===
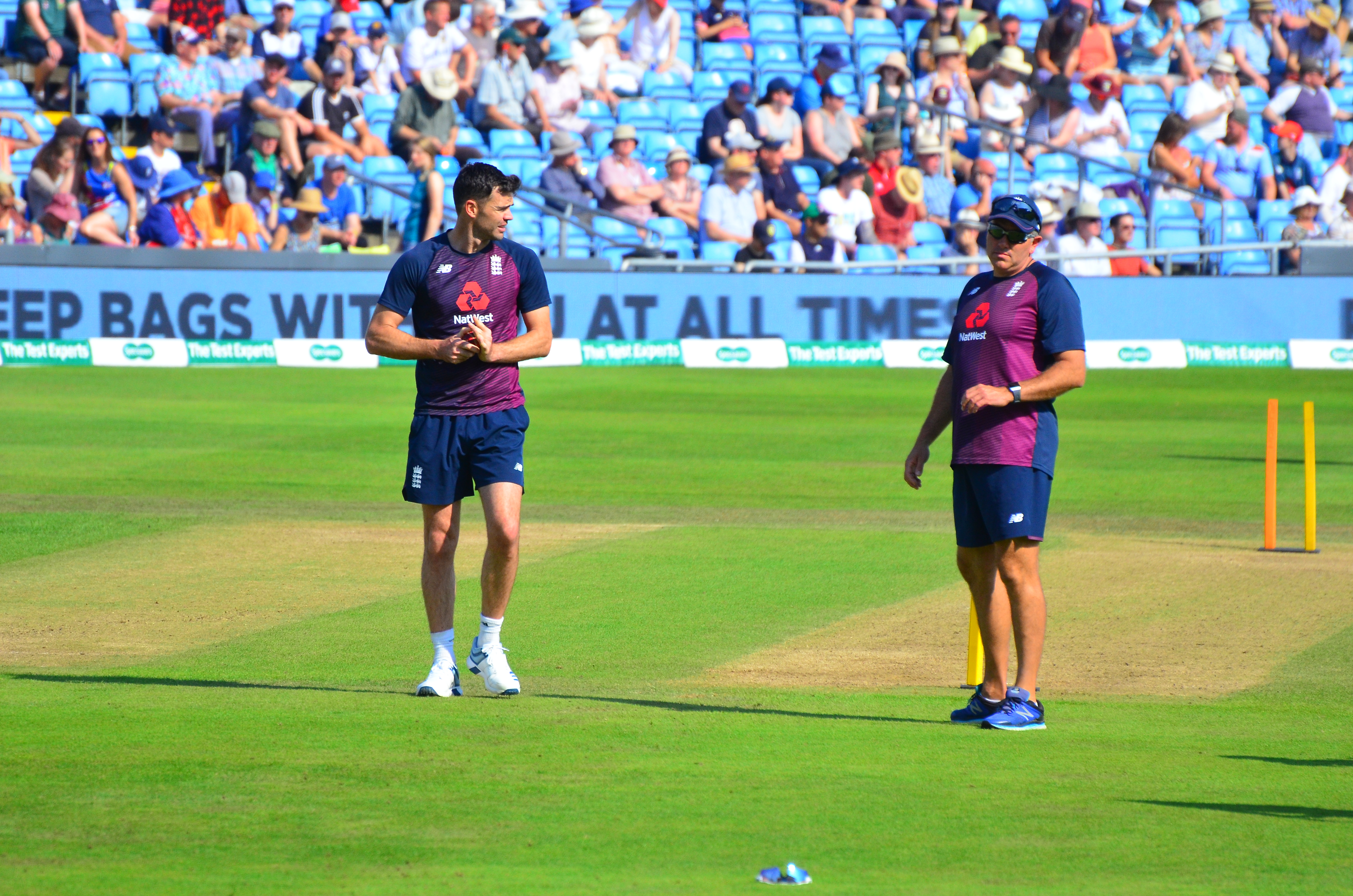
Silverwood with Jimmy Anderson before the third Ashes Test at Headingley.

Silverwood joined the England coaching team as full-time fast bowling coach in January 2018. He was announced as the new head coach on 7 October 2019, following the departure of Trevor Bayliss at the end of the 2019 season. England won their first four series under Silverwood, defeating South Africa and Sri Lanka on tour and West Indies and Pakistan at home.

England's fortune's in Test cricket changed thereafter, however, beginning with a 3-1 defeat in India. Despite this reverse, Silverwood was appointed head of selectors in April 2021, absorbing the national selector role.

Defeat on the subcontinent was followed by a 1-0 defeat at home to New Zealand and defeat in 2 out of 3 tests against India in a series interrupted by the COVID-19 pandemic.

In the 2021–22 Ashes series Silverwood was criticised for poor decisions – most notably batting first and omitting both James Anderson and Stuart Broad in the First Test, and not selecting Jack Leach in the Second Test. It was announced on 3 February 2022, that he would be leaving the role, following a 4–0 Ashes series defeat. Having won 8 of his first 9 Tests, Silverwood lost 10 and won just 1 of his last 14.

=== Sri Lanka ===
In April 2022, he was appointed as head coach for Sri Lanka national cricket team for 2 years.

Silverwood resigned from his position on 27 June 2024.

=== Return to Essex ===
Silverwood rejoined Essex as director of cricket in November 2024.
