= England cricket team Test results (2005–2019) =

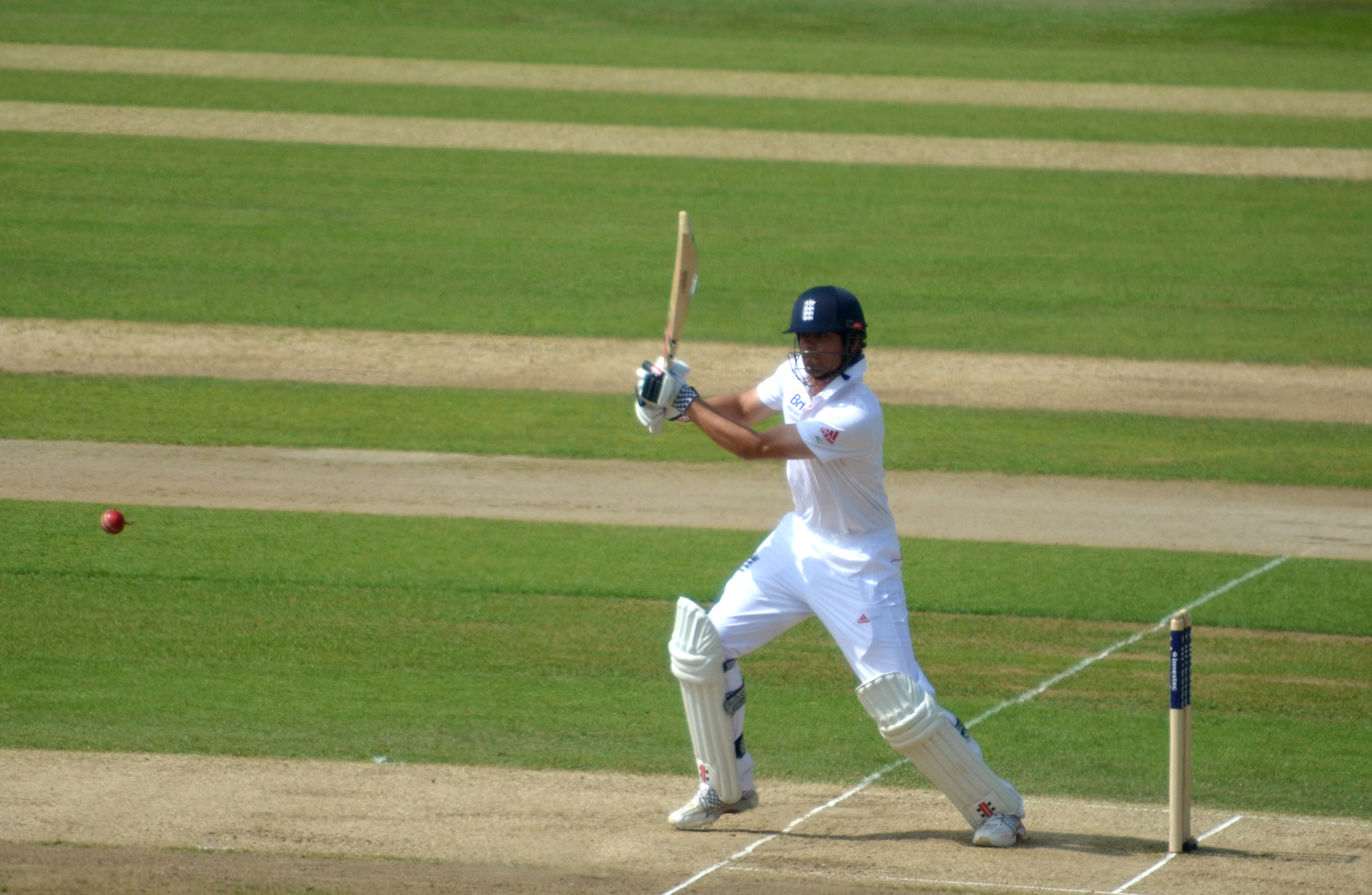
Alastair Cook was England's most-capped player and leading run-scorer in Tests between 2005 and 2019.

The England cricket team represents England and Wales in Test cricket. Between 2005 and 2019, England played 190 Test matches, resulting in 80 victories, 45 draws and 65 defeats. They faced Ireland for the first time in Test cricket during this period.

England faced Australia most frequently during this period—playing 45 matches against them followed by 31 matches against India. England won more matches than they lost against Bangladesh, India, Ireland New Zealand, Sri Lanka and the West Indies. While they had losing records against Australia, Pakistan and South Africa. England won twenty-two matches by an innings, with their largest victory being by an innings and 283 runs against the West Indies in 2007. They won by ten wickets twice during this period, and their largest victory by runs alone was against Pakistan in 2010, whom they beat by 354 runs. Conversely, England lost by an innings 13 times between 2005 and 2019.

== Key ==
Key
Symbol	Meaning
No. (Eng.)	Match number for England (i.e. 900 was England's 900th Test match)
No. (Ove.)	Match number overall (i.e. 1800 was the 1800th Test match)
Opposition	The team England were playing against
Venue	The cricket ground where the match was played
Home/Away/Neutral	Whether the venue is home (England or Wales) or away (opponent's home)
Start date	Starting date of the Test match
Result	Result of the match for England
Series (result)	What series the match was part of, with the result listed in brackets; England's tally first (i.e. (2–1) means that England won two matches, and their opponents won one match)

== Matches ==
England Test cricket results between 2005 and 2019
No. (Eng.)	No. (Ove.)	Opposition	Venue	H/A	Start date	Result	Series (result)
830	1732	South Africa	Newlands Cricket Ground, Cape Town	Away	2 January 2005	Lost by 196 runs	England in South Africa, 2004–05 (2–1) (Note: The 2004–05 series between England and South Africa started in 2004; the first two results are listed at England cricket team Test results (1990–2004).)
831	1734	South Africa	Wanderers Stadium, Johannesburg	Away	13 January 2005	Won by 77 runs	England in South Africa, 2004–05 (2–1)
832	1736	South Africa	Centurion Park, Centurion	Away	21 January 2005	Match drawn	England in South Africa, 2004–05 (2–1)
833	1751	Bangladesh	Lord's, London	Home	26 May 2005	Won by an innings and 261 runs	Bangladesh in England, 2005 (2–0)
834	1753	Bangladesh	Riverside Ground, Chester-le-Street	Home	3 June 2005	Won by an innings and 27 runs	Bangladesh in England, 2005 (2–0)
835	1756	Australia	Lord's, London	Home	21 July 2005	Lost by 239 runs	2005 Ashes series (2–1)
836	1758	Australia	Edgbaston, Birmingham	Home	4 August 2005	Won by 2 runs	2005 Ashes series (2–1)
837	1760	Australia	Old Trafford, Manchester	Home	11 August 2005	Match drawn	2005 Ashes series (2–1)
838	1762	Australia	Trent Bridge, Nottingham	Home	25 August 2005	Won by 3 wickets	2005 Ashes series (2–1)
839	1763	Australia	The Oval, London	Home	8 September 2005	Match drawn	2005 Ashes series (2–1)
840	1770	Pakistan	Multan Cricket Stadium, Multan	Away	12 November 2005	Lost by 22 runs	England in Pakistan, 2005–06 (0–2)
841	1772	Pakistan	Iqbal Stadium, Faisalabad	Away	20 November 2005	Match drawn	England in Pakistan, 2005–06 (0–2)
842	1774	Pakistan	Gaddafi Stadium, Lahore	Away	29 November 2005	Lost by an innings and 100 runs	England in Pakistan, 2005–06 (0–2)
843	1785	India	Vidarbha Cricket Association Stadium, Nagpur	Away	1 March 2006	Match drawn	England in India, 2005–06 (1–1)
844	1788	India	Punjab Cricket Association Stadium, Mohali	Away	9 March 2006	Lost by 9 wickets	England in India, 2005–06 (1–1)
845	1791	India	Wankhede Stadium, Mumbai	Away	18 March 2006	Won by 212 runs	England in India, 2005–06 (1–1)
846	1802	Sri Lanka	Lord's, London	Home	11 May 2006	Match drawn	Sri Lanka in England, 2006 (1–1)
847	1803	Sri Lanka	Edgbaston, Birmingham	Home	25 May 2006	Won by 6 wickets	Sri Lanka in England, 2006 (1–1)
848	1804	Sri Lanka	Trent Bridge, Nottingham	Home	2 June 2006	Lost by 134 runs	Sri Lanka in England, 2006 (1–1)
849	1809	Pakistan	Lord's, London	Home	13 July 2006	Match drawn	Pakistan in England, 2006 (3–0)
850	1811	Pakistan	Old Trafford, Manchester	Home	27 July 2006	Won by an innings and 120 runs	Pakistan in England, 2006 (3–0)
851	1813	Pakistan	Headingley, Leeds	Home	4 August 2006	Won by 167 runs	Pakistan in England, 2006 (3–0)
852	1814	Pakistan	The Oval, London	Home	17 August 2006	Won by forfeit (Note: Match abandoned on day 4 as Pakistan refused to resume play after tea; the match was subsequently awarded to England.)	Pakistan in England, 2006 (3–0)
853	1817	Australia	The Gabba, Brisbane	Away	23 November 2006	Lost by 277 runs	2006–07 Ashes series (0–5)
854	1819	Australia	Adelaide Oval, Adelaide	Away	1 December 2006	Lost by 6 wickets	2006–07 Ashes series (0–5)
855	1821	Australia	WACA Ground, Perth	Away	14 December 2006	Lost by 206 runs	2006–07 Ashes series (0–5)
856	1824	Australia	Melbourne Cricket Ground, Melbourne	Away	26 December 2006	Lost by an innings and 99 runs	2006–07 Ashes series (0–5)
857	1826	Australia	Sydney Cricket Ground, Sydney	Away	2 January 2007	Lost by 10 wickets	2006–07 Ashes series (0–5)
858	1831	West Indies	Lord's, London	Home	17 May 2007	Match drawn	West Indies in England, 2007 (3–0)
859	1834	West Indies	Headingley, Leeds	Home	25 May 2007	Won by an innings and 283 runs	West Indies in England, 2007 (3–0)
860	1835	West Indies	Old Trafford, Manchester	Home	7 June 2007	Won by 60 runs	West Indies in England, 2007 (3–0)
861	1836	West Indies	Riverside Ground, Chester-le-Street	Home	15 June 2007	Won by 7 wickets	West Indies in England, 2007 (3–0)
862	1840	India	Lord's, London	Home	19 July 2007	Match drawn	India in England, 2007 (0–1)
863	1841	India	Trent Bridge, Nottingham	Home	27 July 2007	Lost by 7 wickets	India in England, 2007 (0–1)
864	1842	India	The Oval, London	Home	9 August 2007	Match drawn	India in England, 2007 (0–1)
865	1851	Sri Lanka	Asgiriya Stadium, Kandy	Away	1 December 2007	Lost by 88 runs	England in Sri Lanka, 2007–08 (0–1)
866	1853	Sri Lanka	Singhalese Sports Club Ground, Colombo	Away	9 December 2007	Match drawn	England in Sri Lanka, 2007–08 (0–1)
867	1854	Sri Lanka	Galle International Stadium, Galle	Away	18 December 2007	Match drawn	England in Sri Lanka, 2007–08 (0–1)
868	1866	New Zealand	Seddon Park, Hamilton	Away	5 March 2008	Lost by 189 runs	England in New Zealand, 2007–08 (2–1)
869	1867	New Zealand	Basin Reserve, Wellington	Away	13 March 2008	Won by 126 runs	England in New Zealand, 2007–08 (2–1)
870	1868	New Zealand	McLean Park, Napier	Away	22 March 2008	Won by 121 runs	England in New Zealand, 2007–08 (2–1)
871	1874	New Zealand	Lord's, London	Home	15 May 2008	Match drawn	New Zealand in England, 2008 (2–0)
872	1876	New Zealand	Old Trafford, Manchester	Home	23 May 2008	Won by 6 wickets	New Zealand in England, 2008 (2–0)
873	1878	New Zealand	Trent Bridge, Nottingham	Home	5 June 2008	Won by an innings and 9 runs	New Zealand in England, 2008 (2–0)
874	1880	South Africa	Lord's, London	Home	10 July 2008	Match drawn	South Africa in England, 2008 (1–2)
875	1881	South Africa	Headingley, Leeds	Home	18 July 2008	Lost by 10 wickets	South Africa in England, 2008 (1–2)
876	1883	South Africa	Edgbaston, Birmingham	Home	30 July 2008	Lost by 5 wickets	South Africa in England, 2008 (1–2)
877	1885	South Africa	The Oval, London	Home	7 August 2008	Match drawn	South Africa in England, 2008 (1–2)
878	1898	India	M. A. Chidambaram Stadium, Chennai	Away	11 December 2008	Lost by 6 wickets	England in India, 2008–09 (0–1)
879	1901	India	Punjab Cricket Association Stadium, Mohali	Away	19 December 2008	Match drawn	England in India, 2008–09 (0–1)
880	1906	West Indies	Sabina Park, Kingston	Away	4 February 2009	Lost by an innings and 29 runs	England in the West Indies, 2008–09 (0–1)
881	1907	West Indies	Sir Vivian Richards Stadium, North Sound	Away	13 February 2009	Match drawn	England in the West Indies, 2008–09 (0–1)
882	1908	West Indies	Antigua Recreation Ground, St. John's	Away	15 February 2009	Match drawn	England in the West Indies, 2008–09 (0–1)
883	1911	West Indies	Kensington Oval, Bridgetown	Away	26 February 2009	Match drawn	England in the West Indies, 2008–09 (0–1)
884	1914	West Indies	Queen's Park Oval, Port of Spain	Away	6 March 2009	Match drawn	England in the West Indies, 2008–09 (0–1)
885	1919	West Indies	Lord's, London	Home	6 May 2009	Won by 10 wickets	West Indies in England, 2009 (2–0)
886	1920	West Indies	Riverside Ground, Chester-le-Street	Home	14 May 2009	Won by an innings and 83 runs	West Indies in England, 2009 (2–0)
887	1922	Australia	Sophia Gardens, Cardiff	Home	8 July 2009	Match drawn	2009 Ashes series (2–1)
888	1925	Australia	Lord's, London	Home	16 July 2009	Won by 115 runs	2009 Ashes series (2–1)
889	1928	Australia	Edgbaston, Birmingham	Home	30 July 2009	Match drawn	2009 Ashes series (2–1)
890	1929	Australia	Headingley, Leeds	Home	7 August 2009	Lost by an innings and 80 runs	2009 Ashes series (2–1)
891	1931	Australia	The Oval, London	Home	20 August 2009	Won by 197 runs	2009 Ashes series (2–1)
892	1942	South Africa	Centurion Park, Centurion	Away	16 December 2009	Match drawn	England in South Africa, 2009–10 (1–1)
893	1944	South Africa	Kingsmead Cricket Ground, Durban	Away	26 December 2009	Won by an innings and 98 runs	England in South Africa, 2009–10 (1–1)
894	1946	South Africa	Newlands Cricket Ground, Cape Town	Away	3 January 2010	Match drawn	England in South Africa, 2009–10 (1–1)
895	1948	South Africa	Wanderers Stadium, Johannesburg	Away	14 January 2010	Lost by an innings and 74 runs	England in South Africa, 2009–10 (1–1)
896	1954	Bangladesh	Zohur Ahmed Chowdhury Stadium, Chittagong	Away	12 March 2010	Won by 181 runs	England in Bangladesh, 2009–10 (2–0)
897	1956	Bangladesh	Sher-e-Bangla National Cricket Stadium, Mirpur	Away	20 March 2010	Won by 9 wickets	England in Bangladesh, 2009–10 (2–0)
898	1958	Bangladesh	Lord's, London	Home	27 May 2010	Won by 8 wickets	Bangladesh in England, 2010 (2–0)
899	1959	Bangladesh	Old Trafford, Manchester	Home	4 June 2010	Won by an innings and 80 runs	Bangladesh in England, 2010 (2–0)
900	1967	Pakistan	Trent Bridge, Nottingham	Home	29 July 2010	Won by 354 runs	Pakistan in England, 2010 (3–1)
901	1969	Pakistan	Edgbaston, Birmingham	Home	6 August 2010	Won by 9 wickets	Pakistan in England, 2010 (3–1)
902	1970	Pakistan	The Oval, London	Home	18 August 2010	Lost by 4 wickets	Pakistan in England, 2010 (3–1)
903	1971	Pakistan	Lord's, London	Home	26 August 2010	Won by an innings and 225 runs	Pakistan in England, 2010 (3–1)
904	1981	Australia	The Gabba, Brisbane	Away	25 November 2010	Match drawn	2010–11 Ashes series (3–1)
905	1983	Australia	Adelaide Oval, Adelaide	Away	3 December 2010	Won by an innings and 71 runs	2010–11 Ashes series (3–1)
906	1984	Australia	WACA Ground, Perth	Away	16 December 2010	Lost by 267 runs	2010–11 Ashes series (3–1)
907	1986	Australia	Melbourne Cricket Ground, Melbourne	Away	26 December 2010	Won by an innings and 157 runs	2010–11 Ashes series (3–1)
908	1989	Australia	Sydney Cricket Ground, Sydney	Away	3 January 2011	Won by an innings and 83 runs	2010–11 Ashes series (3–1)
909	1994	Sri Lanka	Sophia Gardens, Cardiff	Home	26 May 2011	Won by an innings and 14 runs	Sri Lanka in England, 2011 (1–0)
910	1995	Sri Lanka	Lord's, London	Home	3 June 2011	Match drawn	Sri Lanka in England, 2011 (1–0)
911	1996	Sri Lanka	Rose Bowl, Southampton	Home	16 June 2011	Match drawn	Sri Lanka in England, 2011 (1–0)
912	2000	India	Lord's, London	Home	21 July 2011	Won by 196 runs	India in England, 2011 (4–0)
913	2001	India	Trent Bridge, Nottingham	Home	29 July 2011	Won by 319 runs	India in England, 2011 (4–0)
914	2003	India	Edgbaston, Birmingham	Home	10 August 2011	Won by an innings and 242 runs	India in England, 2011 (4–0)
915	2004	India	The Oval, London	Home	18 August 2011	Won by an innings and 8 runs	India in England, 2011 (4–0)
916	2030	Pakistan	Dubai International Cricket Stadium, Dubai	Neutral	17 January 2012	Lost by 10 wickets	England against Pakistan in the UAE, 2011–12 (0–3)
917	2032	Pakistan	Sheikh Zayed Cricket Stadium, Abu Dhabi	Neutral	25 January 2012	Lost by 72 runs	England against Pakistan in the UAE, 2011–12 (0–3)
918	2034	Pakistan	Dubai International Cricket Stadium, Dubai	Neutral	3 February 2012	Lost by 71 runs	England against Pakistan in the UAE, 2011–12 (0–3)
919	2038	Sri Lanka	Galle International Stadium, Galle	Away	26 March 2012	Lost by 75 runs	England in Sri Lanka, 2011–12 (1–1)
920	2039	Sri Lanka	Paikiasothy Saravanamuttu Stadium, Colombo	Away	3 April 2012	Won by 8 wickets	England in Sri Lanka, 2011–12 (1–1)
921	2043	West Indies	Lord's, London	Home	17 May 2012	Won by 5 wickets	West Indies in England, 2012 (2–0)
922	2044	West Indies	Trent Bridge, Nottingham	Home	25 May 2012	Won by 9 wickets	West Indies in England, 2012 (2–0)
923	2045	West Indies	Edgbaston, Birmingham	Home	7 June 2012	Match drawn	West Indies in England, 2012 (2–0)
924	2049	South Africa	The Oval, London	Home	19 July 2012	Lost by an innings and 12 runs	South Africa in England, 2012 (0–2)
925	2051	South Africa	Headingley, Leeds	Home	2 August 2012	Match drawn	South Africa in England, 2012 (0–2)
926	2053	South Africa	Lord's, London	Home	16 August 2012	Lost by 51 runs	South Africa in England, 2012 (0–2)
927	2058	India	Sardar Patel Stadium, Ahmedabad	Away	15 November 2012	Lost by 9 wickets	England in India, 2012–13 (2–1)
928	2062	India	Wankhede Stadium, Mumbai	Away	23 November 2012	Won by 10 wickets	England in India, 2012–13 (2–1)
929	2065	India	Eden Gardens, Kolkata	Away	5 December 2012	Won by 7 wickets	England in India, 2012–13 (2–1)
930	2066	India	Vidarbha Cricket Association Stadium, Nagpur	Away	13 December 2012	Match drawn	England in India, 2012–13 (2–1)
931	2077	New Zealand	University Oval, Dunedin	Away	6 March 2013	Match drawn	England in New Zealand, 2012–13 (0–0)
932	2080	New Zealand	Basin Reserve, Wellington	Away	14 March 2013	Match drawn	England in New Zealand, 2012–13 (0–0)
933	2084	New Zealand	Eden Park, Auckland	Away	22 March 2013	Match drawn	England in New Zealand, 2012–13 (0–0)
934	2088	New Zealand	Lord's, London	Home	16 May 2013	Won by 170 runs	New Zealand in England, 2013 (2–0)
935	2089	New Zealand	Headingley, Leeds	Home	24 May 2013	Won by 247 runs	New Zealand in England, 2013 (2–0)
936	2090	Australia	Trent Bridge, Nottingham	Home	10 July 2013	Won by 14 runs	2013 Ashes series (3–0)
937	2091	Australia	Lord's, London	Home	18 July 2013	Won by 347 runs	2013 Ashes series (3–0)
938	2092	Australia	Old Trafford, Manchester	Home	1 August 2013	Match drawn	2013 Ashes series (3–0)
939	2093	Australia	Riverside Ground, Chester-le-Street	Home	9 August 2013	Won by 74 runs	2013 Ashes series (3–0)
940	2094	Australia	The Oval, London	Home	21 August 2013	Match drawn	2013 Ashes series (3–0)
941	2103	Australia	The Gabba, Brisbane	Away	21 November 2013	Lost by 381 runs	2013–14 Ashes series (0–5)
942	2105	Australia	Adelaide Oval, Adelaide	Away	5 December 2013	Lost by 218 runs	2013–14 Ashes series (0–5)
943	2107	Australia	WACA Ground, Perth	Away	13 December 2013	Lost by 150 runs	2013–14 Ashes series (0–5)
944	2110	Australia	Melbourne Cricket Ground, Melbourne	Away	26 December 2013	Lost by 8 wickets	2013–14 Ashes series (0–5)
945	2113	Australia	Sydney Cricket Ground, Sydney	Away	3 January 2014	Lost by 281 runs	2013–14 Ashes series (0–5)
946	2124	Sri Lanka	Lord's, London	Home	12 June 2014	Match drawn	Sri Lanka in England, 2014 (0–1)
947	2126	Sri Lanka	Headingley, Leeds	Home	20 June 2014	Lost by 100 runs	Sri Lanka in England, 2014 (0–1)
948	2128	India	Trent Bridge, Nottingham	Home	9 July 2014	Match drawn	India in England, 2014 (3–1)
949	2130	India	Lord's, London	Home	17 July 2014	Lost by 95 runs	India in England, 2014 (3–1)
950	2132	India	Rose Bowl, Southampton	Home	27 July 2014	Won by 266 runs	India in England, 2014 (3–1)
951	2134	India	Old Trafford, Manchester	Home	7 August 2014	Won by an innings and 54 runs	India in England, 2014 (3–1)
952	2137	India	The Oval, London	Home	15 August 2014	Won by an innings and 244 runs	India in England, 2014 (3–1)
953	2157	West Indies	Sir Vivian Richards Stadium, North Sound	Away	13 April 2015	Match drawn	England in the West Indies, 2014–15 (1–1)
954	2158	West Indies	Queen's Park Oval, Port of Spain	Away	21 April 2015	Won by 9 wickets	England in the West Indies, 2014–15 (1–1)
955	2160	West Indies	Kensington Oval, Bridgetown	Away	1 May 2015	Lost by 5 wickets	England in the West Indies, 2014–15 (1–1)
956	2162	New Zealand	Lord's, London	Home	21 May 2015	Won by 124 runs	New Zealand in England, 2015 (1–1)
957	2163	New Zealand	Headingley, Leeds	Home	29 May 2015	Lost by 199 runs	New Zealand in England, 2015 (1–1)
958	2170	Australia	Sophia Gardens, Cardiff	Home	8 July 2015	Won by 169 runs	2015 Ashes series (3–2)
959	2171	Australia	Lord's, London	Home	16 July 2015	Lost by 405 runs	2015 Ashes series (3–2)
960	2173	Australia	Edgbaston, Birmingham	Home	29 July 2015	Won by 8 wickets	2015 Ashes series (3–2)
961	2175	Australia	Trent Bridge, Nottingham	Home	6 August 2015	Won by an innings and 78 runs	2015 Ashes series (3–2)
962	2178	Australia	The Oval, London	Home	20 August 2015	Lost by an innings and 46 runs	2015 Ashes series (3–2)
963	2180	Pakistan	Sheikh Zayed Cricket Stadium, Abu Dhabi	Neutral	13 October 2015	Match drawn	England against Pakistan in the UAE, 2015–16 (0–2)
964	2183	Pakistan	Dubai International Cricket Stadium, Dubai	Neutral	22 October 2015	Lost by 178 runs	England against Pakistan in the UAE, 2015–16 (0–2)
965	2184	Pakistan	Sharjah Cricket Stadium, Sharjah	Neutral	1 November 2015	Lost by 127 runs	England against Pakistan in the UAE, 2015–16 (0–2)
966	2196	South Africa	Kingsmead Cricket Ground, Durban	Away	26 December 2015	Won by 241 runs	England in South Africa, 2015–16 (2–1)
967	2197	South Africa	Newlands Cricket Ground, Cape Town	Away	2 January 2016	Match drawn	England in South Africa, 2015–16 (2–1)
968	2199	South Africa	Wanderers Stadium, Johannesburg	Away	14 January 2016	Won by 7 wickets	England in South Africa, 2015–16 (2–1)
969	2200	South Africa	Centurion Park, Centurion	Away	22 January 2016	Lost by 280 runs	England in South Africa, 2015–16 (2–1)
970	2203	Sri Lanka	Headingley, Leeds	Home	19 May 2016	Won by an innings and 88 runs	Sri Lanka in England, 2016 (2–0)
971	2204	Sri Lanka	Riverside Ground, Chester-le-Street	Home	27 May 2016	Won by 9 wickets	Sri Lanka in England, 2016 (2–0)
972	2205	Sri Lanka	Lord's, London	Home	9 June 2016	Match drawn	Sri Lanka in England, 2016 (2–0)
973	2206	Pakistan	Lord's, London	Home	14 July 2016	Lost by 75 runs	Pakistan in England, 2016 (2–2)
974	2208	Pakistan	Old Trafford, Manchester	Home	22 July 2016	Won by 330 runs	Pakistan in England, 2016 (2–2)
975	2212	Pakistan	Edgbaston, Birmingham	Home	3 August 2016	Won by 141 runs	Pakistan in England, 2016 (2–2)
976	2216	Pakistan	The Oval, London	Home	11 August 2016	Lost by 10 wickets	Pakistan in England, 2016 (2–2)
977	2225	Bangladesh	Zohur Ahmed Chowdhury Stadium, Chittagong	Away	20 October 2016	Won by 22 runs	England in Bangladesh, 2016–17 (1–1)
978	2227	Bangladesh	Sher-e-Bangla National Cricket Stadium, Mirpur	Away	28 October 2016	Lost by 108 runs	England in Bangladesh, 2016–17 (1–1)
979	2232	India	Saurashtra Cricket Association Stadium, Rajkot	Away	9 November 2016	Match drawn	England in India, 2016–17 (0–4)
980	2235	India	Dr. Y.S. Rajasekhara Reddy ACA-VDCA Cricket Stadium, Visakhapatnam	Away	17 November 2016	Lost by 246 runs	England in India, 2016–17 (0–4)
981	2238	India	Punjab Cricket Association IS Bindra Stadium, Mohali	Away	26 November 2016	Lost by 8 wickets	England in India, 2016–17 (0–4)
982	2239	India	Wankhede Stadium, Mumbai	Away	8 December 2016	Lost by an innings and 36 runs	England in India, 2016–17 (0–4)
983	2241	India	M. A. Chidambaram Stadium, Chennai	Away	16 December 2016	Lost by an innings and 75 runs	England in India, 2016–17 (0–4)
984	2262	South Africa	Lord's, London	Home	6 July 2017	Won by 211 runs	South Africa in England, 2017 (3–1)
985	2264	South Africa	Trent Bridge, Nottingham	Home	14 July 2017	Lost by 340 runs	South Africa in England, 2017 (3–1)
986	2266	South Africa	The Oval, London	Home	27 July 2017	Won by 239 runs	South Africa in England, 2017 (3–1)
987	2268	South Africa	Old Trafford, Manchester	Home	4 August 2017	Won by 177 runs	South Africa in England, 2017 (3–1)
988	2270	West Indies	Edgbaston, Birmingham	Home	17 August 2017	Won by an innings and 209 runs	West Indies in England, 2017 (2–1)
989	2271	West Indies	Headingley, Leeds	Home	25 August 2017	Lost by 5 wickets	West Indies in England, 2017 (2–1)
990	2274	West Indies	Lord's, London	Home	7 September 2017	Won by 9 wickets	West Indies in England, 2017 (2–1)
991	2282	Australia	The Gabba, Brisbane	Away	23 November 2017	Lost by 10 wickets	2017–18 Ashes series (0–4)
992	2285	Australia	Adelaide Oval, Adelaide	Away	2 December 2017	Lost by 120 runs	2017–18 Ashes series (0–4)
993	2288	Australia	WACA Ground, Perth	Away	14 December 2017	Lost by an innings and 41 runs	2017–18 Ashes series (0–4)
994	2289	Australia	Melbourne Cricket Ground, Melbourne	Away	26 December 2017	Match drawn	2017–18 Ashes series (0–4)
995	2291	Australia	Sydney Cricket Ground, Sydney	Away	4 January 2018	Lost by an innings and 123 runs	2017–18 Ashes series (0–4)
996	2299	New Zealand	Eden Park, Auckland	Away	22 March 2018	Lost by an innings and 49 runs	England in New Zealand, 2017–18 (0–1)
997	2301	New Zealand	Hagley Oval, Christchurch	Away	30 March 2018	Match drawn	England in New Zealand, 2017–18 (0–1)
998	2304	Pakistan	Lord's, London	Home	24 May 2018	Lost by 9 wickets	Pakistan in England, 2018 (1–1)
999	2305	Pakistan	Headingley, Leeds	Home	1 June 2018	Won by an innings and 55 runs	Pakistan in England, 2018 (1–1)
1000	2314	India	Edgbaston, Birmingham	Home	1 August 2018	Won by 31 runs	India in England, 2018 (4–1)
1001	2315	India	Lord's, London	Home	9 August 2018	Won by an innings and 159 runs	India in England, 2018 (4–1)
1002	2316	India	Trent Bridge, Nottingham	Home	18 August 2018	Lost by 203 runs	India in England, 2018 (4–1)
1003	2317	India	Rose Bowl, Southampton	Home	30 August 2018	Won by 60 runs	India in England, 2018 (4–1)
1004	2318	India	The Oval, London	Home	7 September 2018	Won by 118 runs	India in England, 2018 (4–1)
1005	2324	Sri Lanka	Galle International Stadium, Galle	Away	6 November 2018	Won by 211 runs	England in Sri Lanka, 2018–19 (3–0)
1006	2326	Sri Lanka	Pallekele International Cricket Stadium, Kandy	Away	14 November 2018	Won by 57 runs	England in Sri Lanka, 2018–19 (3–0)
1007	2329	Sri Lanka	Singhalese Sports Club Ground, Colombo	Away	23 November 2018	Won by 42 runs	England in Sri Lanka, 2018–19 (3–0)
1008	2342	West Indies	Kensington Oval, Bridgetown	Away	23 January 2019	Lost by 381 runs	England in the West Indies, 2018–19 (1–2)
1009	2344	West Indies	Sir Vivian Richards Stadium, North Sound	Away	31 January 2019	Lost by 10 wickets	England in the West Indies, 2018–19 (1–2)
1010	2346	West Indies	Daren Sammy Cricket Ground, Gros Islet	Away	9 February 2019	Won by 232 runs	England in the West Indies, 2018–19 (1–2)
1011	2352	Ireland	Lord's, London	Home	24 July 2019	Won by 143 runs	Ireland in England, 2019 (1–0)
1012	2353	Australia	Edgbaston, Birmingham	Home	1 August 2019	Lost by 251 runs	2019 Ashes series (2–2)
1013	2355	Australia	Lord's, London	Home	14 August 2019	Match drawn	2019 Ashes series (2–2)
1014	2357	Australia	Headingley, Leeds	Home	22 August 2019	Won by 1 wicket	2019 Ashes series (2–2)
1015	2360	Australia	Old Trafford, Manchester	Home	4 September 2019	Lost by 185 runs	2019 Ashes series (2–2)
1016	2362	Australia	The Oval, London	Home	12 September 2019	Won by 135 runs	2019 Ashes series (2–2)
1017	2367	New Zealand	Bay Oval, Mount Maunganui	Away	21 November 2019	Lost by an innings and 65 runs	England in New Zealand, 2019–20 (0–1)
1018	2371	New Zealand	Seddon Park, Hamilton	Away	29 November 2019	Match drawn	England in New Zealand, 2019–20 (0–1)
1019	2377	South Africa	Centurion Park, Centurion	Away	26 December 2019	Lost by 107 runs	England in South Africa, 2019–20 (3–1) (Note: The 2019–20 series between England and South Africa concluded in 2020; the final three results are listed at England cricket team Test results (2020–present).)

== Summary ==
Team	Total matches					Home matches					Away or neutral venue matches				
Team	Mat	Won	Lost	Draw	W/L	Mat	Won	Lost	Draw	W/L	Mat	Won	Lost	Draw	W/L
Australia	45	15	21	9	0.714	25	12	6	7	2.000	20	3	15	2	0.200
Bangladesh	8	7	1	0	7.000	4	4	0	0	—	4	3	1	0	3.000
India	31	14	10	7	1.400	17	11	3	3	3.666	14	3	7	4	0.428
Ireland	1	1	0	0	—	1	1	0	0	—	0	0	0	0	—
New Zealand	17	7	4	6	1.750	7	5	1	1	5.000	10	2	3	5	0.666
Pakistan	23	9	11	3	0.818	14	9	4	1	2.250	9	0	7	2	0.000
South Africa	23	8	9	6	0.888	11	4	5	2	0.800	12	4	4	4	1.000
Sri Lanka	19	8	4	7	2.000	11	4	2	5	2.000	8	4	2	2	2.000
West Indies	23	11	5	7	2.200	12	9	1	2	9.000	11	2	4	5	0.500
Total	190	80	65	45	1.230	102	59	22	21	2.681	88	21	43	24	0.488
