= Gerhardus Liebenberg =

South African cricketer (born 1972)

Cricket information
- Batting: Right-handed
- Bowling: Right-arm fast-medium

Career statistics
Competition	Test	ODI
Matches	5	4
Runs scored	104	94
Batting average	13.00	23.50
100s/50s	0/0	0/0
Top score	45	39
Catches/stumpings	1/–	0/–
- Source: Cricinfo, 25 January 2006

Gerhardus Frederick Johannes Liebenberg (born 7 April 1972) is a South African cricketer who played in five Test matches and four One Day Internationals from 1995 to 1998. He was dropped from South Africa's Test squad, after poor performances during the tour to England in 1998.
