= Sri Lankan cricket team in England in 1998 =

Sri Lanka cricket team in England in 1998
- Date: 12 July 1998 – 31 August 1998
- Location: England
- Result: Sri Lanka won the only Test
- Player of the series: Muttiah Muralitharan
Teams
- England: Sri Lanka
Captains
- Alec Stewart: Arjuna Ranatunga
Most runs
- John Crawley (170) Graeme Hick (107) Mark Ramprakash (93): Sanath Jayasuriya (237); Aravinda de Silva (152); Arjuna Ranatunga (51)
Most wickets
- Angus Fraser (3) Darren Gough (2) Ben Hollioake (2) Dominic Cork (2): Muttiah Muralitharan (16); Pramodya Wickramasinghe (2); Suresh Perera (1)

The Sri Lanka national cricket team toured England in the 1998 season. On the tour they played 4 first-class matches, 5 List A matches and a single Test match. They also competed in a tri-series tournament against England and South Africa, entitled the Emirates Triangular Tournament. They won the competition by defeating England in the final, also beating South Africa in the group stage. They won the only Test, with Muttiah Muralitharan taking a career best 16/220 – the 5th best bowling figures in a match in Test cricket history.

== Tour matches ==
=== List A: Hampshire v Sri Lankans ===
The limited overs match against Hampshire, to be played at County Ground, Southampton on 12 July, was abandoned without a ball bowled. It did not have List A status.

=== First-class: Somerset v Sri Lankans ===
14–16 July
Scorecard

Somerset	v	Sri Lankans
366/6d (96.1 overs); Keith Parsons 101* (147); Pramodya Wickramasinghe 4/69 (24.1 overs)		130 (52.4 overs); Hashan Tillakaratne 38 (120); Matthew Bulbeck 3/20 (11 overs)
177/7 (37 overs); Peter Bowler 66 (85); Mario Villavarayan 2/35 (8 overs)		483/6d (f/o) (113 overs); Russel Arnold 209 (270); Matthew Bulbeck 3/104 (19 overs)

Match drawn
County Ground, Taunton
Umpires: Barry Dudleston (Eng) and Roy Palmer (Eng)

- Somerset won the toss and elected to bat.

=== First-class: Glamorgan v Sri Lankans ===
18–20 July
Scorecard

Sri Lankans	v	Glamorgan
54 (21.5 overs); Marvan Atapattu 19 (46); Darren Thomas 4/10 (4 overs)		224 (66.4 overs); Matthew Maynard 99 (151); Muttiah Muralitharan 5/77 (27.4 overs)
222 (78.3 overs); Marvan Atapattu 99 (199); Adrian Dale 5/25 (10.3 overs)		53/5 (17.2 overs); Ismail Dawood 22 (25); Muttiah Muralitharan 5/17 (7 overs)

Glamorgan won by 5 wickets
Sophia Gardens, Cardiff
Umpires: Mervyn Kitchen (Eng) and Peter Willey (Eng)

- Sri Lankans won the toss and elected to bat.

=== First-class: Leicestershire v Sri Lankans ===
24–27 July
Scorecard

Leicestershire	v	Sri Lankans
245 (87 overs); Jonathan Dakin 79 (146); Muttiah Muralitharan 3/41 (23 overs)		509 (132.4 overs); Hashan Tillakaratne 120 (183); Jonathan Dakin 4/110 (38 overs)
362 (78.3 overs); Ben Smith 75 (134); Muttiah Muralitharan 5/108 (55 overs)		99/1 (24.5 overs); Russel Arnold 44* (83); Carl Crowe 1/20 (7 overs)

Sri Lanka won by 9 wickets
Grace Road, Leicester
Umpires: Nigel Plews (Eng) and John Steele (Eng)

- Leicestershire won the toss and elected to bat.

=== List A: Worcestershire v Sri Lankans ===
28 July
Scorecard

Worcestershire; 279/6 (50 overs)	v	Sri Lankans; 281/3 (47.2 overs)
Graeme Hick 111; Kumar Dharmasena 2/46 (10 overs)		Marvan Atapattu 68; Phil Newport 2/33 (10 overs)

Sri Lankans won by 7 wickets
New Road, Worcester
Umpires: Kevin Lyons (Eng) and Alan Whitehead (Eng)

- Worcestershire won the toss and elected to bat.

=== First-class: Middlesex v Sri Lankans ===
31 July – 3 August
Scorecard

Middlesex	v	Sri Lankans
313 (113.4 overs); David Goodchild 105 (267); Mario Villavarayan 4/36 (18.4 overs)		424 (109.5 overs); Marvan Atapattu 114 (161); Christopher Batt 4/103 (22.5 overs)
231/7 (78.3 overs); Paul Weekes 49 (126); Ravindra Pushpakumara 3/52 (18 overs)

Match drawn
Lord's, London
Umpires: Paul Adams (Eng) and Barrie Leadbeater (Eng)

- Sri Lankans won the toss and elected to field.
- No play on day 4.

=== 50-over: England Cricket Board XI v Sri Lankans ===
5 August
Scorecard

England Cricket Board XI; 141/9 (50 overs)	v	Sri Lankans; 144/2 (28.1 overs)
Stephen Foster 32; Aravinda de Silva 3/12 (10 overs)		Aravinda de Silva 53*; Stephen Foster 1/24 (6 overs)

Sri Lankans won by 8 wickets
County Ground, Lakenham
Umpires: Trevor Jesty (Eng) and Ray Julian (Eng)

- Sri Lankans won the toss and elected to field.

This match did not have List A status.

=== List A: Northamptonshire v Sri Lankans ===
7 August
Scorecard

Northamptonshire; 227/5 (50 overs)	v	Sri Lankans; 231/9 (47.5 overs)
David Sales 91* (107); Kumar Dharmasena 2/27 (10 overs)		Arjuna Ranatunga 69 (72); Tony Penberthy 2/26 (4 overs)

Sri Lankans won by 1 wicket
County Ground, Northampton
Umpires: David Constant (Eng) and Ken Shuttleworth (Eng)

- Sri Lankans won the toss and elected to field.

=== List A: Northamptonshire v Sri Lankans ===
9 August
Scorecard

Sri Lankans; 308/6 (50 overs)	v	Northamptonshire; 292 (49.1 overs)
Sanath Jayasuriya 119 (116); Paul Taylor 2/50 (10 overs)		Tony Penberthy 71 (65); Pramodya Wickramasinghe 3/42 (7 overs)

Sri Lankans won by 16 runs
County Ground, Northampton
Umpires: Jeremy Lloyds (Eng) and David Shepherd (Eng)

- Toss not known.

=== List A: Kent v Sri Lankans ===
11 August
Scorecard

Kent; 176/8 (45 overs)	v	Sri Lankans; 179/2 (33.4 overs)
Mark Ealham 40; Muttiah Muralitharan 2/21 (9 overs)		Aravinda de Silva 66*; Dean Headley 1/14 (7 overs)

Sri Lanka won by 8 wickets
St Lawrence Ground, Canterbury
Umpires: Vanburn Holder (WI) and Trevor Jesty (Eng)

- Kent won the toss and elected to bat.
- Match reduced to 45 overs a side.

The match's length was reduced after initial attempts to start a game had failed, due to problems with the pitch. Sanath Jayasuriya had been hit on the hand four times in the first four overs, and it was agreed that it was too hazardous to play on. Play resumed with 5 overs lost for each side.

=== First-class: Hampshire v Sri Lankans ===
22–24 August
Scorecard

Hampshire	v	Sri Lankans
347/8 (113.4 overs); Giles White 156 (308); Sanath Jayasuriya 3/42 (14 overs)		39/4d (12 overs); Sanath Jayasuriya 11 (15); Alex Morris 2/15 (6 overs)
Innings forfeited		309/5 (79.1 overs); Chandika Hathurusingha 108* (184); Simon Francis 2/47 (15 overs)

Sri Lankans won by 5 wickets
County Ground, Southampton
Umpires: Chris Balderstone (Eng) and Neil Mallender (Eng)

- No play on day 2 due to rain.

Trailing by 308 runs and having lost their top order, the Sri Lankans decided to declare, with the hope of giving their openers and top order some batting practice. Despite being able to enforce the follow-on, Hampshire instead decided to forfeit their second innings, giving the Sri Lankans a target of 309 runs off the last 89 overs of the final day to win, which they reached following an unbeaten century from Chandika Hathurusingha and 90 from Mahela Jayawardene. Jayawardene went on to claim a place in Sri Lanka's Test squad to face England.

== Emirates Triangular Tournament ==
Sri Lanka played in a tri-series tournament with South Africa and England. Played in a round-robin format, all three teams played each other once, with the top two teams going through to a head-to-head final to decide the winner.

=== Group stage ===
Pos	Team	P	W	L	NR	T	Points	NRR
1	England	2	1	1	0	0	2	+0.220
2	Sri Lanka	2	1	1	0	0	2	+0.210
3	South Africa	2	1	1	0	0	2	−0.430

	ENG	SL	SA
England	XXX	W 36 runs	L 14 runs
Sri Lanka	L 36 runs	XXX	W 57 runs
South Africa	W 14 runs	L 57 runs	XXX

==== Table key ====
P = Games played
W = Games won
L = Games lost
NR = Games with no result
T = Games tied
NRR = Net run rate

==== Points system ====
Won = 2 points
Lost = 0 points
Tie or No result = 1 point
Standard net run rate rules applied.

==== Position deciders ====
The deciding factors, in order, on table position were:

1. Total points
2. Head-to-head result
3. Net run rate

Because England and Sri Lanka had the best run rates, they were ranked as the top two teams. England beat Sri Lanka and finished top of the group. South Africa's run rate meant they missed out on the final, despite having beaten England, and that a better run rate than Sri Lanka would have put them top of the table.

=== Final ===
20 August
Scorecard

England; 256/8 (50 overs)	v	Sri Lanka; 260/5 (47.1 overs)
Nick Knight 94 (136); Muttiah Muralitharan 5/34 (10 overs)		Marvan Atapattu 132* (151); Darren Gough 2/50 (10 overs)

Sri Lanka won by 5 wickets
Lord's Cricket Ground, London
Umpires: David Constant (Eng) and David Shepherd (Eng)
Player of the match: Muttiah Muralitharan (SL)

- England won the toss and elected to bat.

== Test series ==
=== Only Test ===
27–31 August
Scorecard

England	v	Sri Lanka
445 (158.3 overs); John Crawley 156* (249); Muttiah Muralitharan 7/155 (59.3 overs)		591 (156.5 overs); Sanath Jayasuriya 213 (278); Angus Fraser 3/95 (23 overs)
181 (129.2 overs); Mark Ramprakash 42 (220); Muttiah Muralitharan 9/65 (54.2 overs)		37/0 (5 overs); Sanath Jayasuriya 24* (17)

Sri Lanka won by 10 wickets
The Oval, London
Umpires: Eddie Nicholls (WI) and David Shepherd (Eng)
Player of the match: Muttiah Muralitharan (SL)

- Sri Lanka won the toss and elected to field.
- Steve James (England) made his Test debut.

==== Records ====
Muttiah Muralitharan claimed what was, at the time, a career best 9/65 in the second innings – a record he has only bettered on one occasion, against Zimbabwe in 2002 – and was the 8th best bowling in a Test match innings at the time, but has slipped two places to 10th. The 16/220 claimed in the match is the 5th best bowling record in a match, a position it has stood in since the match.

John Crawley also claimed a Test career best of 156 not out. The match was the last England Test to be broadcast live by BBC Television in the UK, with Channel 4 and Sky screening the 1999 New Zealand tour of England.

== See also ==
- South African cricket team in England in 1998
- 1998 Emirates Triangular Tournament
