= Robert Croft =

British cricketer

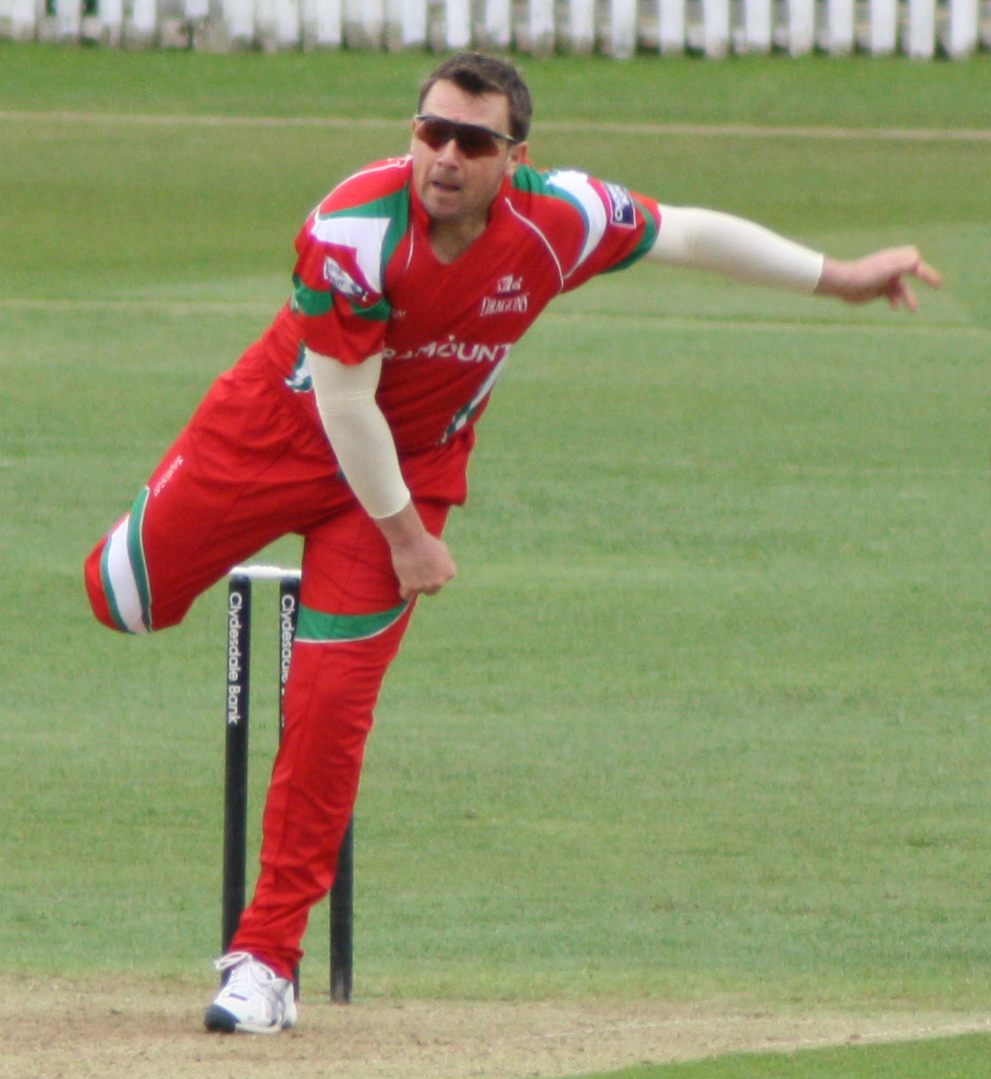

Personal information
- Full name: Robert Damien Bale Croft
- Born: 25 May 1970 (age 56); Morriston, Swansea, Wales
- Nickname: Crofty
- Height: 170 cm (5 ft 7 in)
- Batting: Right-handed
- Bowling: Right-arm off break
- Role: All rounder

International information
- National side: England
- Test debut (cap 582): 22 August 1996 v Pakistan
- Last Test: 2 August 2001 v Australia
- ODI debut (cap 138): 29 August 1996 v Pakistan
- Last ODI: 21 June 2001 v Australia

Domestic team information
- Years: Team
- 1989–2012: Glamorgan (squad no. 10)

Career statistics
Competition	Test	ODI	FC	LA
Matches	21	50	407	408
Runs scored	421	345	12,880	6,490
Batting average	16.19	14.37	26.17	23.42
100s/50s	0/0	0/0	8/54	4/32
Top score	37*	32	143	143
Balls bowled	4,619	2,466	89,156	18,511
Wickets	49	45	1,175	411
Bowling average	37.24	38.73	35.08	32.62
5 wickets in innings	1	0	51	1
10 wickets in match	0	0	9	0
Best bowling	5/95	3/51	8/66	6/20
Catches/stumpings	10/–	11/–	177/–	94/–
- Source: Cricinfo, 15 June 2022

Robert Damien Bale Croft MBE (born 25 May 1970) is a former Welsh cricketer who played international cricket for the England cricket team. He is an off-spin bowler who played for Glamorgan and captained the county from 2003 to 2006. He retired from first class cricket at the end of the 2012 season, having played county cricket for 23 seasons. He commentates on cricket occasionally for Sky Sports.

== Early life and education ==
Croft was born on 25 May 1970 in Morriston, Swansea. He was educated at St John Lloyd Roman Catholic Comprehensive School, Llanelli. He played rugby union as a scrum half for Llanelli RFC Under-11s. He studied at Swansea Metropolitan University.

== Cricketing career ==
He made his England debut against Pakistan in 1996, and did enough to earn a touring place to Zimbabwe and New Zealand. In Christchurch, he took his Test best figures of 5–95 and his winter figures were a highly impressive 182.1–53–340–18. He played the first five tests of the 1997 Ashes series but was dropped for the final test, replaced by Phil Tufnell, after averaging 54 with the ball and showing a weakness to short-pitched fast bowling as a batsman.

Around this time, Croft was involved in what ESPNCricinfo calls "an unsavoury, but in truth pretty harmless, pushing and finger-wagging incident" with Mark Ilott during the NatWest Trophy semi-final against Essex, which Glamorgan narrowly lost. However Croft had a happier experience that year in helping his county to their first County Championship in 28 years, Croft taking 54 wickets in Glamorgan's campaign at an average of 23.31.

Croft toured the West Indies with England that winter, but in spite of taking six wickets in the fourth Test, it was the only Test he played that series. Restored to the England Test team the following summer, his last-wicket stand with Angus Fraser in the third Test of the 1998 series against South Africa saved England from an innings defeat, Croft personally scoring his highest Test score, 37 not out. Wisden observed that "England found an unlikely hero in Croft, who made up for three wicketless Tests by keeping his end intact for more than three hours". Croft was dropped for the next Test, although his innings helped to shift the momentum in the series, which England won. He enjoyed another relatively successful tour in Sri Lanka early in 2001, taking nine wickets at 28.66 as England won the three-match Test series. In general, Croft was a more effective Test bowler overseas, where he took 35 wickets in 9 Tests at 24.65, than in England, where he took 14 wickets in 12 Tests at 68.71.

His final Test match was the third Ashes Test of 2001 at Trent Bridge where he bowled just 3 overs. He was selected for the subsequent tour of India but he withdrew because of safety fears and was also selected for the 2003/04 tour of Sri Lanka but failed to play. After returning home, he announced his international retirement to concentrate on the captaincy of Glamorgan.

On 12 September 2006, after just two County Championship victories in 15 games thus far in the season, he announced his resignation from the captaincy, and was succeeded by David Hemp.

Exactly a year later, he passed 1,000 first-class wickets after dismissing Niall O'Brien; he became the first Welsh cricketer to take the double of 10,000 first-class career runs and 1,000 first-class career wickets. As of March 2022, he is the last cricketer anywhere to achieve this feat in first-class cricket, and with the increasing focus of higher-ability cricketers on limited-over forms of the game, he is likely to remain the last. In November 2007, he joined voices calling for a "clampdown" on Twenty20 problems with abusive crowds, after suffering abusive calls at Taunton Cricket Ground. On 1 August 2010 he got his first hat-trick against Gloucestershire to help Glamorgan win the match. It also made him the first Glamorgan spinner to take a hat-trick in 46 years.

Croft was once honoured as a druid at the Welsh cultural event, the National Eisteddfod.

He was appointed Member of the Order of the British Empire (MBE) in the 2013 New Year Honours for services to cricket.

In October 2018, Croft left his role as Glamorgan head coach.

== England tours ==
England 'A'

- West Indies 1992
- South Africa 1993/94

England

- Zimbabwe / New Zealand 1996/97
- Sharjah / West Indies 1997/98
- Australia 1998/99
- Sri Lanka 2000/01 and 2003/04.

== Team honours ==
Glamorgan (1989 – 2012)

Champions

- County Championship: 1997
- National League: 1993, 2002, 2004
- National League Division 2: 2001

== Individual honours ==
- Glamorgan Cap: 1992
- Glamorgan Young Player of the Year: 1990, 1992
- Glamorgan Player of the Year: 1996, 2003, 2004, 2007
- St. Helen's Balconiers Player of the Year: 2007
- Glamorgan benefit season: 2000
- Glamorgan captain: 2003–2006
- The Weatherall Award: 2004 (for the leading all-rounder in English first-class game)
- Reached 1000 first class wickets for Glamorgan

== Career best performances ==
	Batting				Bowling			
	Score	Fixture	Venue	Season	Score	Fixture	Venue	Season
Tests	37*	England v South Africa	Manchester	1998	5–95	England v New Zealand	Christchurch	1997
ODI	32	England v Sri Lanka	Perth	1999	3–51	England v South Africa	The Oval	1998
FC	143	Glamorgan v Somerset	Taunton	1995	8–66	Glamorgan v Warwickshire	Swansea	1992
LA	143	Glamorgan Dragons v Lincolnshire	Lincoln	2004	6–20	Glamorgan v Worcestershire	Cardiff	1994
T20	62*	Glamorgan Dragons v Gloucestershire Gladiators	Cardiff	2005	3–9	Glamorgan Dragons v Somerset	Cardiff	2011

== Achievements ==
- First Welsh cricketer to score 10,000 runs and take 1,000 wickets in first-class cricket (2007)
- Elected to the Gorsedd of Bards

== Books ==
- Bennett, Androw and Croft, Robert (1995) Dyddiadur Troellwr Y Lolfa, Talybont, Dyfed ISBN 0-86243-358-4
- Steen, Rob with Croft, Robert and Elliott, Matthew (1997) Poms and cobbers : the Ashes 1997 : an inside view Andre Deutsch, London ISBN 0-233-99210-3
