= English cricket team in Zimbabwe in 1996–97 =

International cricket tour

	Zimbabwe	England
- Dates: 15 December 1996 – 3 January 1997
Captains	Alistair Campbell	Michael Atherton

Test series
- Result: 2-match series drawn 0–0
Most runs	Alistair Campbell (135)	Alec Stewart (241)
Most wickets	Paul Strang (10)	Robert Croft (8)

One Day International series
- Results: Zimbabwe won the 3-match series 3–0
Most runs	Alistair Campbell (126)	Alec Stewart (96)
Most wickets	Eddo Brandes (7)	Darren Gough (7)

The English cricket team toured Zimbabwe for a two-match Test series and a three-match One Day International (ODI) series between 15 December 1996 and 3 January 1997. The Test series was drawn 0–0 and Zimbabwe won the ODI series 3–0. It was England's first senior tour of Zimbabwe.

== Test series ==
=== 1st Test ===
18–22 December 1996
Scorecard

Zimbabwe	v	England
376 (137.5 overs); Andy Flower 112 (331); Chris Silverwood 3/63 (18 overs)		406 (151.4 overs); Nasser Hussain 113 (278); Paul Strang 5/123 (58.4 overs)
234 (101 overs); Guy Whittall 56 (184); Phil Tufnell 4/61 (31 overs)		204/6 (37 overs); Nick Knight 96 (117); Paul Strang 2/63 (14 overs)

Match drawn
Queens Sports Club, Bulawayo
Umpires: Steve Dunne (NZ) and Ian Robinson (Zim)
Player of the match: Nick Knight (Eng)

- Zimbabwe won the toss and elected to bat.
- This was the first Test in history to finish in a draw with the scores level. England needed three runs to win off the final ball of the match, but Nick Knight was run out attempting the third run. The result was not a tie because England's second innings was unfinished when the match ended.

=== 2nd Test ===
26–30 December 1996
Scorecard

England	v	Zimbabwe
156 (83.1 overs); John Crawley 47* (169); Guy Whittall 4/18 (16 overs)		215 (105 overs); Grant Flower 73 (255); Darren Gough 4/40 (26 overs)
195/3 (93 overs); Alec Stewart 101* (267); Paul Strang 2/42 (26 overs)

Match drawn
Harare Sports Club, Harare
Umpires: KT Francis (SL) and Russell Tiffin (Zim)
Player of the match: Grant Flower (Zim)

- Zimbabwe won the toss and elected to field.
- No play on day 5 because of overnight rain.

== ODI series ==
=== 1st ODI ===
15 December 1996
Scorecard

England; 152 (45.5 overs)	v	Zimbabwe; 153/8 (43.5 overs)
Nasser Hussain 49* (87); John Rennie 3/27 (8 overs)		Andy Waller 48 (71); Alan Mullally 2/24 (10 overs)

Zimbabwe won by 2 wickets
Queens Sports Club, Bulawayo
Umpires: Quintin Goosen (Zim) and Russell Tiffin (Zim)
Player of the match: Alistair Campbell (Zim)

- Zimbabwe won the toss and elected to field.

=== 2nd ODI ===
1 January 1997
Scorecard

Zimbabwe; 200 (48.5 overs)	v	England; 179/7 (42 overs)
Andy Flower 63 (114); Darren Gough 4/43 (8.5 overs)		John Crawley 73 (109); Paul Strang 3/24 (9 overs)

Zimbabwe won by 6 runs (D/L method)
Harare Sports Club, Harare
Umpires: Graeme Evans (Zim) and Ian Robinson (Zim)
Player of the match: John Crawley (Eng) and Paul Strang (Zim)

- England won the toss and elected to field.
- Rain reduced the England innings to 42 overs, with a revised target of 185 runs.
- This match was the first use in international cricket of the D/L method.

=== 3rd ODI ===
3 January 1997
Scorecard

Zimbabwe; 249/7 (50 overs)	v	England; 118 (30 overs)
Alistair Campbell 80* (103); Craig White 1/39 (7 overs)		Robert Croft 30* (37); Eddo Brandes 5/28 (10 overs)

Zimbabwe won by 131 runs
Harare Sports Club, Harare
Umpires: Russell Tiffin (Zim) and Ian Robinson (Zim)
Player of the match: Eddo Brandes (Zim)

- England won the toss and elected to field.
- Eddo Brandes took the first ODI hat-trick for Zimbabwe.

== See also ==
- English cricket team in New Zealand in 1996–97 that followed this tour
