= South African cricket team in England in 1998 =

South Africa in England 1998
	South Africa	England
- Dates: 14 May – 20 August 1998
Captains	Hansie Cronje	Alec Stewart

Test series
- Result: England won the 5-match series 2–1
Most runs	Hansie Cronje (401)	Michael Atherton (493)
Most wickets	Allan Donald (33)	Angus Fraser (24)
- Player of the series: Allan Donald (SA), Mike Atherton (Eng)

One Day International series
- Results: South Africa won the 3-match series 2–1
Most runs	Hansie Cronje (110)	Nick Knight (149)
Most wickets	Allan Donald (7)	Mark Ealham, Robert Croft, Darren Gough (5)
- Player of the series: Jonty Rhodes (SA), Darren Gough (Eng)

The South African cricket team toured England in the 1998 season to play a five-match Test series against England.

England won the series 2-1 with two matches drawn after being 1-0 behind with only the last two matches to play.

South Africa played a three-match series of One Day Internationals (LOI) against England in May at the start of the tour and then played a short LOI tri-series against England and Sri Lanka to close the tour in August.

In addition, South Africa played seven first-class matches against Worcestershire, Gloucestershire, Sussex, Durham, Derbyshire, Essex and the British Universities.

== Test series summary ==
=== First Test ===
4–8 June 1998
Scorecard

England	v	South Africa
462 (181 overs); Michael Atherton 103 (279); Allan Donald 4/95 (35 overs)		343 (117.3 overs); Jonty Rhodes 95 (156); Dominic Cork 5/93 (32.3 overs)
170/8d (45.1 overs); Michael Atherton 43 (115); Graham Thorpe 43 (59); Lance Klusener 3/27 (11 overs)

Match drawn
Edgbaston, Birmingham
Umpires: David Shepherd (Eng) and Russell Tiffin (Zim)
Player of the match: Michael Atherton (Eng)

- South Africa won the toss and elected to field.
- No play was possible on the final day due to rain.

=== Second Test ===
18–21 June 1998
Scorecard

South Africa	v	England
360 (108.1 overs); Jonty Rhodes 117 (200); Dominic Cork 6/119 (31.1 overs)		110 (46.3 overs); Extras 20; Nasser Hussain 15 (47); Allan Donald 5/32 (15.3 overs)
15/0 (1.1 overs); Gary Kirsten 9* (4)		264 (f/o) (120 overs); Nasser Hussain 105 (294); Jacques Kallis 4/24 (19 overs)

South Africa won by 10 wickets
Lord's, London
Umpires: Darrell Hair (Aus) and George Sharp (Eng)
Player of the match: Jonty Rhodes (SA)

- England won the toss and elected to field.
- Steve James (Eng) made his Test debut.

=== Third Test ===
2–6 July 1998
Scorecard

South Africa	v	England
552/5d (199.5 overs); Gary Kirsten 210 (525); Darren Gough 3/116 (37 overs)		183 (82.1 overs); Michael Atherton 41 (120); Paul Adams 4/63 (31 overs)
		369/9 (f/o) (171 overs); Alec Stewart 164 (317); Allan Donald 6/88 (40 overs)

Match drawn
Old Trafford, Manchester
Umpires: Doug Cowie (NZ) and Peter Willey (Eng)
Player of the match: Jacques Kallis (SA)

- South Africa won the toss and elected to bat.
- Ashley Giles (Eng) made his Test debut.

=== Fourth Test ===
23–27 July 1998
Scorecard

South Africa	v	England
374 (103.2 overs); Hansie Cronje 126 (212); Angus Fraser 5/60 (26 overs)		336 (127.5 overs); Mark Butcher 75 (141); Allan Donald 5/109 (33 overs)
208 (75.3 overs); Hansie Cronje 67 (168); Angus Fraser 5/62 (28.3 overs)		247/2 (87 overs); Michael Atherton 98* (277); Allan Donald 1/56 (23 overs)

England won by 8 wickets
Trent Bridge, Nottingham
Umpires: Steve Dunne (NZ) and Mervyn Kitchen (Eng)
Player of the match: Angus Fraser (Eng)

- England won the toss and elected to field.
- Andrew Flintoff (Eng) and Steve Elworthy (SA) made their Test debuts.

=== Fifth Test ===
6–10 August 1998
Scorecard

England	v	South Africa
230 (83.3 overs); Mark Butcher 116 (252); Makhaya Ntini 4/72 (21 overs)		252 (90.3 overs); Hansie Cronje 57 (163); Angus Fraser 5/42 (25 overs)
240 (110.2 overs); Nasser Hussain 94 (341); Shaun Pollock 5/53 (35 overs)		195 (75 overs); Jonty Rhodes 85 (147); Darren Gough 6/42 (23 overs)

England won by 23 runs
Headingley, Leeds
Umpires: Javed Akhtar (Pak) and Peter Willey (Eng)
Player of the match: Mark Butcher (Eng)

- England won the toss and elected to bat.

== ODI series ==
=== 1st ODI ===
21 May 1998
Scorecard

England; 223/9 (50 overs)	v	South Africa; 224/7 (48.4 overs)
Nick Knight 64 (90); Allan Donald 2/45 (10 overs)		Jacques Kallis 62 (91); Robert Croft 3/51 (10 overs)

South Africa won by 3 wickets
The Oval, London
Umpires: Chris Balderstone (Eng) and Peter Willey (Eng)
Player of the match: Jacques Kallis (SA)

- South Africa won the toss and elected to field.
- Chris Adams and Darren Maddy (both Eng) made their ODI debuts.

=== 2nd ODI ===
23 May 1998
Scorecard

South Africa; 226/9 (50 overs)	v	England; 194 (46.4 overs)
Lance Klusener 55* (49); Darren Gough 4/35 (10 overs)		Alec Stewart 52 (75); Allan Donald 3/32 (8.4 overs)

South Africa won by 32 runs
Old Trafford, Manchester
Umpires: Ray Julian (Eng) and David Shepherd (Eng)
Player of the match: Lance Klusener (SA)

- England won the toss and elected to field.

=== 3rd ODI ===
24 May 1998
Scorecard

South Africa; 205/8 (50 overs)	v	England; 206/3 (35 overs)
Shaun Pollock 60 (64); Mark Ealham 3/44 (10 overs)		Ali Brown 59 (40); Allan Donald 2/35 (7 overs)

England won by 7 wickets
Headingley, Leeds
Umpires: John Hampshire (Eng) and George Sharp (Eng)
Player of the match: Ali Brown (Eng)

- South Africa won the toss and elected to bat.

In the end of tour Emirates Triangular tri-series, South Africa lost to Sri Lanka by 57 runs at Trent Bridge and defeated England by 14 runs at Edgbaston. The win against England was not enough to qualify them for the final, in which Sri Lanka defeated England by 5 wickets at Lord's.

== Squad ==
The South African team was captained by Hansie Cronje and included Paul Adams, Allan Donald, Shaun Pollock, Lance Klusener, Jacques Kallis, Jonty Rhodes, Mark Boucher, Daryl Cullinan, Gary Kirsten, Gerhardus Liebenberg, Nantie Hayward, Brian McMillan, Makhaya Ntini, Pat Symcox, Adam Bacher, Steve Elworthy and Mike Rindel.

== Best performances ==
Darryl Cullinan with 900 runs at an average of 69.23 and Gary Kirsten with 892 runs at 63.71 were the highest scorers for South Africa in first-class matches on the tour. Kirsten had the highest individual innings of 210 while Cullinan's top score was 200*.

Allan Donald with 39 wickets at an average of 20.12 and a best analysis of 6-56 was the leading bowler on the tour. Shaun Pollock was the next best with 24 wickets at 24.75.

Mark Boucher kept wicket in nearly all of the tour matches, taking 43 catches and 1 stumping.

== External sources ==
CricketArchive tour itinerary
