= English cricket team in New Zealand in 1996–97 =

International cricket tour

The England national cricket team toured New Zealand in February and March 1997 and played a three-match Test series against the New Zealand national cricket team. England won the series 2–0 with one match drawn. Five ODIs, along with 4 tour matches were also played.

== Test series ==
=== 1st Test ===
24–28 January 1997
(5-day match)
Scorecard

| New Zealand | v | England |
| 390 (131.5 overs); SP Fleming 129 (254); D Gough 4/91 (32 overs) | | 521 (187.4 overs); AJ Stewart 173 (277); DK Morrison 3/104 (24.4 overs) |
| 248/9d (114 overs); NJ Astle 102* (214); PCR Tufnell 3/53 (40 overs) |

Match drawn
Eden Park, Auckland
Umpires: SA Bucknor (WI) and RS Dunne (NZ)
Player of the match: AJ Stewart (ENG) and NJ Astle (NZ)

- England won the toss and elected to field.

=== 2nd Test ===
6–10 February 1997
(5-day match)
Scorecard

| New Zealand | v | England |
| 124 (48.3 overs); DN Patel 45 (66); D Gough 5/40 (16 overs) | | 383 (137.3 overs); GP Thorpe 108 (249); SB Doull 5/75 (28 overs) |
| 191 (103.2 overs); BA Pocock 64 (271); D Gough 4/52 (23 overs) |

England won by an innings and 68 runs
Basin Reserve, Wellington
Umpires: SA Bucknor (WI) and DB Cowie (NZ)
Player of the match: GP Thorpe (ENG)

- New Zealand won the toss and elected to bat.
- DL Vettori (NZ) made his Test debut.

=== 3rd Test ===
14–18 February 1997
(5-day match)
Scorecard

| New Zealand | v | England |
| 346 (129.1 overs); SP Fleming 62 (167); RDB Croft 5/95 (39.1 overs) | | 228 (84.4 overs); MA Atherton 94* (235); GI Allott 4/74 (18 overs) |
| 186 (88.3 overs); CL Cairns 52 (106); D Gough 3/42 (13.3 overs) | | 307/6 (146.4 overs); MA Atherton 118 (311); DL Vettori 4/97 (57 overs) |

England won by 4 wickets
Lancaster Park, Christchurch
Umpires: RS Dunne (NZ) and DB Hair (AUS)
Player of the match: MA Atherton (ENG)

- England won the toss and elected to field.
- MJ Horne (NZ) made his Test debut.

== ODIs series ==
The series was drawn 2-2, with one match tied.

=== 1st ODI ===
20 February 1997 (D/N)
Scorecard

| New Zealand; 222/6 (50 overs) | v | England; 226/6 (48.5 overs) |
| NJ Astle 50 (62); PCR Tufnell 4/22 (10 overs) | | GP Thorpe 82 (104); HT Davis 3/44 (8.5 overs) |

England won by 4 wickets
Lancaster Park, Christchurch
Umpires: CE King and DM Quested
Player of the match: PCR Tufnell (ENG)

- New Zealand won the toss and elected to bat.

=== 2nd ODI ===
23 February 1997
Scorecard

| New Zealand; 253/8 (50 overs) | v | England; 134/4 (19.3 overs) |
| CL Cairns 79 (74); AR Caddick 2/33 (6 overs) | | NV Knight 84* (70); SB Doull 2/39 (5 overs) |

England won by 6 wickets (run rate)
Eden Park, Auckland
Umpires: BF Bowden and DB Cowie
Player of the match: NV Knight (ENG)

- New Zealand won the toss and elected to bat.
- England’s target was reduced to 132 runs from 26 overs (as 253 x 26/50 = 131.56).

=== 3rd ODI ===
26 February 1997 (D/N)
Scorecard

| New Zealand; 237 (49.4 overs) | v | England; 237/8 (50 overs) |
| BA Young 53 (82); C White 4/37 (5.4 overs) | | GP Thorpe 55 (61); CZ Harris 3/20 (10 overs) |

Match tied
McLean Park, Napier
Umpires: CE King and DM Quested
Player of the match: CZ Harris (NZ)

- New Zealand won the toss and elected to bat.
- GI Allott (NZ) made his ODI debut.

=== 4th ODI ===
2 March 1997
Scorecard

| New Zealand; 153 (39.5 overs) | v | England; 144 (41.3 overs) |
| NJ Astle 51 (68); RDB Croft 2/26 (9 overs) | | AJ Stewart 42 (68); GR Larsen 3/20 (8.3 overs) |

New Zealand won by 9 runs
Eden Park, Auckland
Umpires: DB Cowie and RS Dunne
Player of the match: GR Larsen and NJ Astle (both NZ)

- England won the toss and elected to field.
- The match was originally scheduled for 1 March but was delayed by rain.
- The match was reduced to 43 overs by rain.

=== 5th ODI ===
4 March 1997
Scorecard

| New Zealand; 228/8 (50 overs) | v | England; 200 (47.5 overs) |
| NJ Astle 94 (129); AR Caddick 3/35 (10 overs) | | GP Thorpe 55 (82); NJ Astle 2/26 (5 overs) |

New Zealand won by 28 runs
Basin Reserve, Wellington
Umpires: RS Dunne and EA Watkin
Player of the match: NJ Astle (NZ)

- New Zealand won the toss and elected to bat.

== See also ==
- English cricket team in Zimbabwe in 1996–97 that ended weeks before this tour
