= English cricket team in India in 1979–80 =

International cricket tour

- Date: 15–19 February 1980
- Location: India
- Result: England won the only Test
Teams
- India: England
Captains
- Gundappa Viswanath: Mike Brearley
Most runs
- Sunil Gavaskar (73) Yashpal Sharma (48) Kapil Dev (45): Ian Botham (114); Geoff Boycott (65); Graham Gooch (57)
Most wickets
- Karsan Ghavri (5) Kapil Dev (3) Dilip Doshi (1): Ian Botham (13); John Lever (4); Graham Stevenson (2)

The England national cricket team visited India in February 1980 and played a single Test match against the India national cricket team. It was played to celebrate the golden jubilee of the formation of Board of Control for Cricket in India.

== Test series ==
=== Only Test ===
15–19 February 1980
Scorecard

India	v	England
242 (69.5 overs); Sunil Gavaskar 49 (68); Ian Botham 6/58 (22.5 overs)		296 (97.1 overs); Ian Botham 114 (144); Karsan Ghavri 5/52 (20.1 overs)
149 (52.1 overs); Kapil Dev 45* (82); Ian Botham 7/48 (26 overs)		98/0 (29.3 overs); Graham Gooch 49* (85); Sunil Gavaskar 0/4 (1 overs)

England won by 10 wickets
Wankhede Stadium, Bombay
Umpires: Jiban Ghosh (Ind) and SN Hanumantha Rao (Ind)

- India won the toss and elected to bat.
- Graham Stevenson (Eng) made his Test debut.
- 16 February was a rest day. This was because of a solar eclipse.
- Bob Taylor (Eng) equalled the record of taking seven dismissals in a Test innings as the designated wicket-keeper. This was first achieved by Wasim Bari of Pakistan one year prior.
