= Indian cricket team in England in 1990 =

International cricket tour

The Indian cricket team toured England in the 1990 season and played 14 first-class matches including three Tests. They also played in two limited overs internationals. England won the Test series 1–0 with two matches drawn. The Indian team was captained by Mohammed Azharuddin and was a mix of both youth and experience, having experienced veterans such as Dilip Vengsarkar, Ravi Shastri and Kapil Dev as well as upcoming stars like Sanjay Manjrekar and Sachin Tendulkar. The series is notable for Graham Gooch's triple century, legendary leg-spinner and future Indian cricket captain Anil Kumble making his international debut and Tendulkar making his 1st Test century at the age of 17, becoming the youngest Test centurion at the time.

== Background ==
India were the second touring side to visit England in 1990, following New Zealand, who had lost their three-match Test series 1–0 and drawn the One Day series 1–1 during their tour. England's victory against New Zealand was their first series win at home since the 1985 Ashes and, except for a victory in a one-off match against Sri Lanka, their first home Test victory in 24 attempts. India's previous tour of England was in 1986, when they won 2–0; coming into the 1990 tour, they had not won an away Test match since. The two sides had not met since the 1986 tour.

The Indian team selected for the tour was different compared to the successful 1986 team. Legendary players like Sunil Gavaskar and Mohinder Amarnath had long since retired, while opener Krishnamachari Srikkanth and left-arm spinner Maninder Singh were dropped. However the team now had a young Sachin Tendulkar, who had already proved himself at the age of 17 as capable of being world-class and was now being predicted as the successor to Gavaskar. Captain Mohammed Azharuddin was now the leading batsman in the side while the 1986 tour winning captain Kapil Dev, Ravi Shastri and the hero of the 1986 tour, Dilip Vengsarkar, were slowly coming to the end of their careers.

== One Day series ==
=== First ODI ===
18 July 1990
Scorecard

England; 229 (54.3 overs)	v	India; 233/4 (53 overs)
Allan Lamb 56 (77); Manoj Prabhakar 3/40 (10.3 overs)		Sanjay Manjrekar 82 (133); Chris Lewis 2/58 (10 overs)

India won by 6 wickets
Headingley, Leeds
Umpires: John Hampshire and John Holder
Player of the match: Anil Kumble

- India won the toss and elected to field.

=== Second ODI ===
20 July 1990
Scorecard

England; 281 (55 overs)	v	India; 282/5 (53 overs)
Robin Smith 103 (105); Manoj Prabhakar 3/58 (11 overs)		Mohammad Azharuddin 63* (44); Eddie Hemmings 2/53 (11 overs)

India won by 5 wickets
Trent Bridge, Nottingham
Umpires: Mervyn Kitchen and David Shepherd
Player of the match: Robin Smith

- India won the toss and elected to field.

== Test series ==
=== First Test ===
26–31 July 1990
Scorecard

England	v	India
653/4d (162 overs); Graham Gooch 333 (485); Narendra Hirwani 1/102 (30 overs)		454 (114.1 overs); Mohammad Azharuddin 121 (111); Angus Fraser 5/104 (39.1 overs)
272/4d (54.2 overs); Graham Gooch 123 (113); Sanjeev Sharma 2/75 (15 overs)		224 (62 overs); Sanjeev Sharma 38 (26); Angus Fraser 3/39 (22 overs)

England won by 247 runs
Lord's, London
Umpires: Dickie Bird and Nigel Plews
Player of the match: Graham Gooch

- India won the toss and elected to field.
- 29 July was taken as a rest day.
- Graham Gooch's total of 456 runs remains the highest number of runs scored by a player in a single Test match.

=== Second Test ===
9–14 August 1990
Scorecard

England	v	India
519 (160.5 overs); Mike Atherton 131 (276); Narendra Hirwani 4/174 (62 overs)		432 (119.2 overs); Mohammad Azharuddin 179 (243); Angus Fraser 5/124 (35 overs)
320/4d (81 overs); Allan Lamb 109 (141); Kapil Dev 2/69 (22 overs)		343/6 (90 overs); Sachin Tendulkar 119* (189); Eddie Hemmings 3/75 (31 overs)

Match drawn
Old Trafford, Manchester
Umpires: John Hampshire and John Holder
Player of the match: Sachin Tendulkar

- England won the toss and elected to bat.
- 12 August was taken as a rest day.
- Anil Kumble (Ind) made his debut in Tests.

=== Third Test ===
23–28 August 1990
Scorecard

India	v	England
606/9d (173 overs); Ravi Shastri 187 (436); Devon Malcolm 2/110 (35 overs)		340 (123.4 overs); Graham Gooch 85 (248); Manoj Prabhakar 4/74 (32.4 overs)
		477/4 (f/o) (154 overs); David Gower 157* (270); Kapil Dev 2/66 (24 overs)

Match drawn
The Oval, London
Umpires: Nigel Plews and David Shepherd
Player of the match: David Gower

- India won the toss and elected to bat.
- 26 August was taken as a rest day.
- India enforced the follow-on.

== Aftermath ==
Both Azharuddin and Atherton were named Wisden Cricketers of the Year.

== External sources ==
CricketArchive – tour itineraries

== Annual reviews ==
- Playfair Cricket Annual 1991
- Wisden Cricketers' Almanack 1991
