= New Zealand cricket team in Sri Lanka in 1986–87 =

International cricket tour

	Sri Lanka	New Zealand
- Dates: April 16 – May 18 1987
Captains	Duleep Mendis	Jeff Crowe

Test series
- Result: 3-match series drawn 0–0
Most runs	Brendon Kuruppu (201)	Richard Hadlee (151)
Most wickets	Ravi Ratnayeke (2)	Richard Hadlee (4)

The New Zealand cricket team toured Sri Lanka in 1987, with the intention of playing three test matches and three one day internationals. The first test at Colombo Cricket Club Ground ended in a draw. The second and third Tests were both cancelled because of civil disturbances. The tour was cut short due to a bomb exploding near the New Zealand team's hotel in Colombo. The terrorist bomb responsible for killing 113 civilians was planted by the Tamil Tigers separatist movement and was not targeted towards the touring New Zealand cricket team. However, the team voted overwhelmingly to return home after just one Test of the scheduled three-Test tour. In the aftermath of the incident, no international tours of Sri Lanka were undertaken until 1992.

== Test series summary ==
=== First Test ===
16–21 April 1987
(5-day match)
Scorecard

Sri Lanka	v	New Zealand
397/9d (173.5 overs); DSBP Kuruppu 201* (548); RJ Hadlee 4/102 (38.5 overs)		406/5 (163 overs); RJ Hadlee 151* (240); JR Ratnayeke 2/111 (37 overs)

Match drawn
Colombo Cricket Club Ground, Colombo
Umpires: PW Vidanagamage, WAU Wickremasinghe

- New Zealand won the toss and elected to field.
- 17 April was taken as a rest day.
- AH Jones (NZ) and DSBP Kuruppu (SL) made their Test debuts.

=== Second Test ===
24–29 April 1987
(5-day match)
Scorecard

Sri Lanka	v	New Zealand

Match cancelled
Asgiriya Stadium, Kandy

- 27 April was planned as a rest day.

=== Third Test ===
5–10 May 1987
(5-day match)
Scorecard

Sri Lanka	v	New Zealand

Match cancelled
Sinhalese Sports Club Ground, Colombo

- 8 May was planned as a rest day.
