= Graham Stevenson =

English cricketer

Personal information
- Full name: Graham Barry Stevenson
- Born: 16 December 1955; Ackworth, West Yorkshire
- Died: 21 January 2014 (aged 58)
- Batting: Right-handed
- Bowling: Right-arm medium
- Role: Bowler

International information
- National side: England
- Test debut: 15 February 1980 v India
- Last Test: 27 March 1981 v West Indies
- ODI debut: 14 January 1980 v Australia
- Last ODI: 26 February 1981 v West Indies

Domestic team information
- Years: Team
- 1973–1986: Yorkshire
- 1987: Northamptonshire

Career statistics
Competition	Test	ODI	FC	LA
Matches	2	4	188	225
Runs scored	28	43	3,965	1,794
Batting average	28.00	43.00	20.33	13.00
100s/50s	0/0	0/0	2/16	0/2
Top score	27*	28*	115*	81*
Balls bowled	312	192	26,668	10,191
Wickets	5	7	488	307
Bowling average	36.60	17.85	28.84	23.07
5 wickets in innings	0	0	18	4
10 wickets in match	0	0	2	0
Best bowling	3/111	4/33	8/57	5/27
Catches/stumpings	0/–	2/–	18/2	4/–
- Source: CricInfo, 24 May 2009

Graham Barry Stevenson (16 December 1955 – 21 January 2014) was an English cricketer, who played in two Test matches and four One Day Internationals from 1980 to 1981.

His county cricket career was spent mainly with Yorkshire and, latterly, Northamptonshire.

== Life and career ==
Stevenson was born in 1955 in Ackworth, West Riding of Yorkshire. He was a right-armed fast bowler, who also found occasional success as a right-handed lower order batsman, and very occasional wicket-keeper; playing for Yorkshire from 1973 to 1986, and for Northamptonshire in 1987. Stevenson took 488 first-class wickets in 188 games at an average of 28.84, with an additional 307 wickets in the one day game. He scored two first-class centuries, with a top score of 115 not out. With that innings, Stevenson became only the eighth No. 11 to make a first-class hundred, in a partnership of 149 with Geoffrey Boycott against Warwickshire at Edgbaston in 1982. That partnership remains Yorkshire's all-time record for the tenth wicket.

Stevenson made all his international appearances on tour with England. He travelled to Australia and India in 1979–80, and to the West Indies in 1980–81. He made his One Day International debut in Australia, in the World Series Cup, taking four wickets and scoring 28 not out in a winning cause.

Stevenson died of complications of a stroke on 21 January 2014. He was 58.
