= List of international cricket five-wicket hauls by Richard Hadlee =

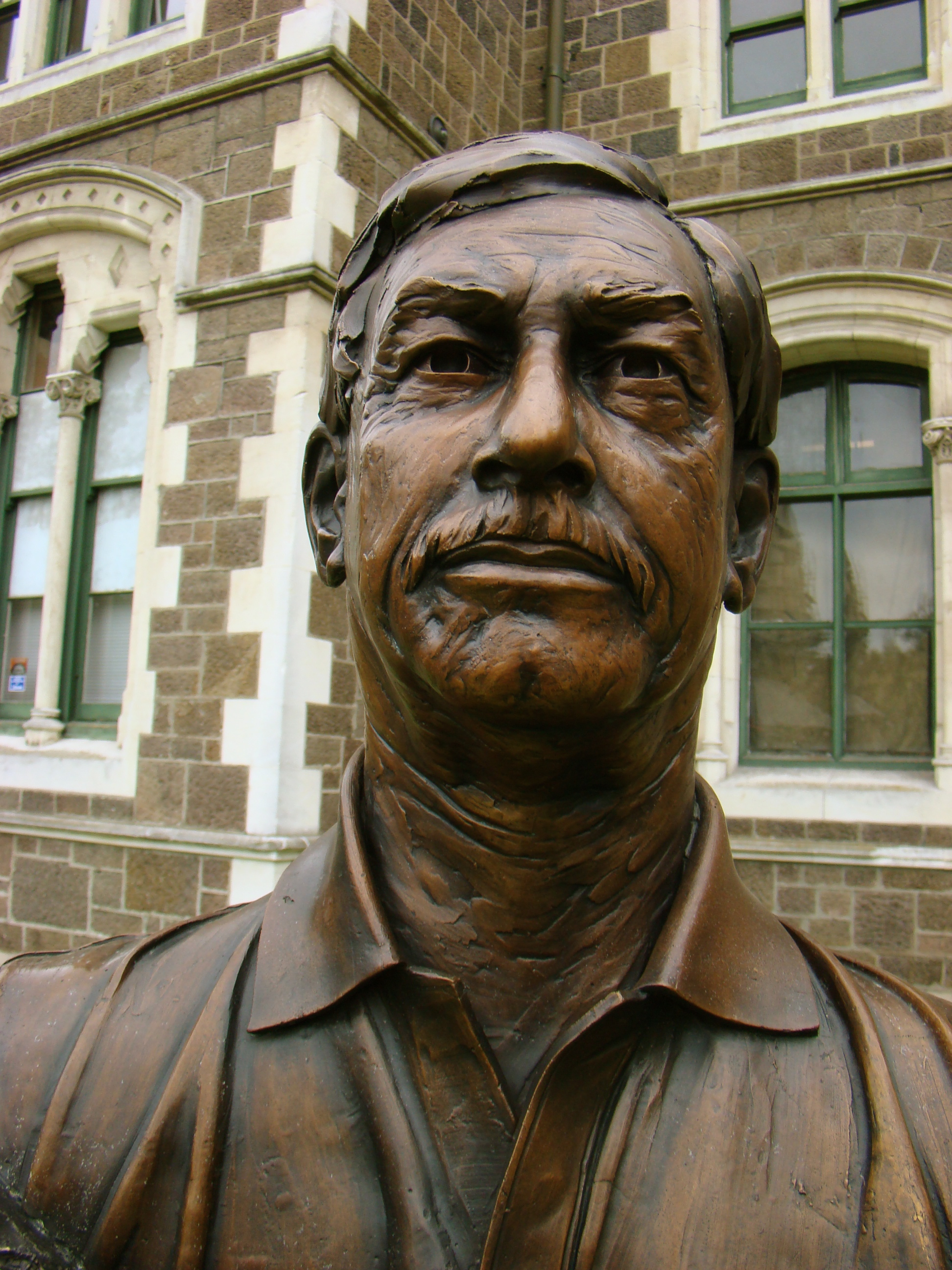
Statue of Hadlee

In cricket, a five-wicket haul (also known as a "five–for" or "fifer") refers to a bowler taking five or more wickets in a single innings. This is regarded as a notable achievement, and fewer than 54 bowlers have taken more than 15 five-wicket hauls at international level in their cricketing careers as October 2024. Richard Hadlee, a retired New Zealand cricketer, took 41 five-wicket hauls during his career in international cricket. A fast bowler who represented his country between 1973 and 1990, Hadlee was described by the BBC as "one of the greatest bowlers the world has seen". Hadlee was named by Wisden as one of their Cricketers of the Year in 1982. In 2009, the International Cricket Council (ICC) inducted him into the ICC Cricket Hall of Fame. Hadlee was the first bowler to take 400 wickets in Test cricket.

Hadlee made his Test debut in 1973 against Pakistan at the Basin Reserve, Wellington. His first Test five-wicket haul came in 1976, against India in a match at the same venue which New Zealand won. In February 1980, he took his first pair of five-wicket hauls in a single match against the West Indies at the Carisbrook, Dunedin. By the end of his career, he had claimed five-wicket hauls in both innings of a match on five occasions. He went on to take ten or more wickets in a match on nine occasions. In Tests, Hadlee was most successful against Australia, with fourteen five-wicket hauls. His best bowling figures in an innings were 9 wickets for 52 runs against the same team at the Brisbane Cricket Ground, in November 1985. He followed up in the second innings of that match with 6 for 71 and achieved his best match figures of 15 for 123 to give New Zealand an innings win.

Having made his One Day International (ODI) debut in February 1973 against Pakistan at the Lancaster Park, Christchurch, Hadlee's first ODI five-wicket haul came in 1980 against India, in a match at the WACA Ground, Perth, which New Zealand lost. His career-best bowling figures in ODI cricket were 5 wickets for 25 runs against Sri Lanka at the County Cricket Ground, Bristol, in June 1983. By the time he retired from international cricket in 1990 after nearly 17 years, Hadlee had taken 36 five-wicket hauls in Test cricket and five in ODIs. As of October 2012, he is second overall among all-time combined five-wicket haul takers, behind Muttiah Muralitharan.

== Key ==
Symbol	Meaning
Date	Day the Test started or ODI held
Inn	Innings in which five-wicket haul was taken
Overs	Number of overs bowled
Runs	Number of runs conceded
Wkts	Number of wickets taken
Econ	Runs conceded per over
Batsmen	Batsmen whose wickets were taken
Result	Result for the New Zealand team
*	One of two five-wicket hauls by Hadlee in a match
†	10 or more wickets taken in the match
‡	Hadlee was selected as man of the match

== Tests ==
Five-wicket hauls in Test cricket
No.	Date	Ground	Against	Inn	Overs	Runs	Wkts	Econ	Batsmen	Result
1	13 February 1976 †	Basin Reserve, Wellington	India	4	8.3 (Note: Eight-ball overs were bowled in this match.)	23	7	2.05	Surinder Amarnath; Gundappa Viswanath; Brijesh Patel; Syed Kirmani; Erapalli Prasanna; Bishan Singh Bedi; Bhagwat Chandrasekhar	Won
2	9 October 1976	Gaddafi Stadium, Lahore	Pakistan	1	19	121	5	4.77	Majid Khan; Sadiq Mohammad; Mushtaq Mohammad; Asif Iqbal; Imran Khan	Lost
3	10 February 1978 †	Basin Reserve, Wellington	England	4	13.3	26	6	1.45	Graham Roope; Ian Botham; Chris Old; Phil Edmonds; Mike Hendrick; Bob Willis	Won
4	24 August 1978	Lord's Cricket Ground, London	England	2	32	84	5	2.62	Graham Gooch; Clive Radley; Mike Brearley; Bob Taylor; Phil Edmonds	Lost
5	2 February 1979	Lancaster Park, Christchurch	Pakistan	1	25	62	5	1.86	Talat Ali; Mohsin Khan; Javed Miandad; Haroon Rasheed; Mushtaq Mohammad	Lost
6	23 February 1979	Eden Park, Auckland	Pakistan	2	27	104	5	2.88	Talat Ali; Mushtaq Mohammad; Imran Khan; Sarfraz Nawaz; Sikander Bakht	Drawn
7	9 February 1980* †	Carisbrook, Dunedin	West Indies	1	20	34	5	1.70	Gordon Greenidge; Desmond Haynes; Alvin Kallicharran; Clive Lloyd; Michael Holding	Won
8	9 February 1980* †	Carisbrook, Dunedin	West Indies	3	36	68	6	1.88	Gordon Greenidge; Lawrence Rowe; Clive Lloyd; Deryck Murray; Derick Parry; Joel Garner	Won
9	12 December 1980	WACA Ground, Perth	Australia	2	27	87	5	3.22	Graeme Wood; Kim Hughes; Doug Walters; Rod Marsh; Dennis Lillee	Lost
10	26 December 1980 ‡	Melbourne Cricket Ground, Melbourne	Australia	3	27.2	57	6	2.08	Graeme Wood; Greg Chappell; Kim Hughes; Allan Border; Rodney Hogg; Jim Higgs	Drawn
11	6 March 1981	Lancaster Park, Christchurch	India	1	33	47	5	1.42	Sunil Gavaskar; Chetan Chauhan; Gundappa Viswanath; Sandeep Patil; Yashpal Sharma	Drawn
12	12 March 1982	Eden Park, Auckland	Australia	3	28	63	5	2.25	Bruce Laird; Greg Chappell; Rod Marsh; Bruce Yardley; Jeff Thomson	Won
13	19 March 1982	Lancaster Park, Christchurch	Australia	1	28.5	100	6	3.46	Graeme Wood; Kim Hughes; Rod Marsh; Bruce Yardley; Jeff Thomson; Dennis Lillee	Lost
14	14 July 1983 ‡	Kennington Oval, London	England	1	23.4	53	6	2.23	Graeme Fowler; David Gower; Ian Botham; Vic Marks; Bob Taylor; Norman Cowans	Lost
15	11 August 1983	Lord's Cricket Ground, London	England	1	40	93	5	2.32	Chris Smith; Mike Gatting; Bob Taylor; Neil Foster; Bob Willis	Lost
16	3 February 1984 ‡	Lancaster Park, Christchurch	England	3	18	28	5	1.55	Chris Tavaré; David Gower; Derek Randall; Bob Willis; Norman Cowans	Won
17	26 February 1984 * † ‡	Colombo Cricket Club Ground, Colombo	Sri Lanka	1	22	73	5	3.31	Sidath Wettimuny; Sanath Kaluperuma; Ravi Ratnayeke; Somachandra de Silva; Guy de Alwis	Won
18	26 February 1984 * † ‡	Colombo Cricket Club Ground, Colombo	Sri Lanka	3	16	29	5	1.81	Sidath Wettimuny; Sanath Kaluperuma; Somachandra de Silva; Guy de Alwis; Jayantha Amerasinghe	Won
19	9 February 1985	Carisbrook, Dunedin	Pakistan	1	24	51	6	2.12	Mudassar Nazar; Javed Miandad; Zaheer Abbas; Rashid Khan; Saleem Malik; Tahir Naqqash	Won
20	8 November 1985 * † ‡	Brisbane Cricket Ground, Brisbane	Australia	1	23.4	52	9	2.19	Kepler Wessels; Andrew Hilditch; David Boon; Allan Border; Greg Ritchie; Wayne Phillips; Greg Matthews; Craig McDermott; Bob Holland	Won
21	8 November 1985 * † ‡	Brisbane Cricket Ground, Brisbane	Australia	3	28.5	71	6	2.46	Andrew Hilditch; Wayne Phillips; Greg Matthews; Craig McDermott; Dave Gilbert; Bob Holland	Won
22	22 November 1985	Sydney Cricket Ground, Sydney	Australia	2	24	65	5	2.70	Robbie Kerr; David Boon; Greg Ritchie; Greg Matthews; Dave Gilbert; Bob Holland	Lost
23	30 November 1985* † ‡	WACA Ground, Perth	Australia	1	26.5	65	5	2.42	David Boon; Allan Border; Greg Matthews; Geoff Lawson; Bob Holland	Won
24	30 November 1985 * † ‡	WACA Ground, Perth	Australia	3	39	90	6	2.30	Robbie Kerr; David Boon; Allan Border; Greg Matthews; Geoff Lawson; Dave Gilbert	Won
25	28 February 1986	Lancaster Park, Christchurch	Australia	1	44	116	7	2.59	Geoff Marsh; David Boon; Greg Ritchie; Greg Matthews; Steve Waugh; Tim Zoehrer; Dave Gilbert	Drawn
26	24 July 1986	Lord's Cricket Ground, London	England	1	37.5	80	6	2.11	Graham Gooch; Martyn Moxon; Bill Athey; Mike Gatting; Phil Edmonds; Graham Dilley	Drawn
27	7 August 1986 † ‡	Trent Bridge, Nottingham	England	1	32	80	6	2.50	Graham Gooch; Martyn Moxon; Mike Gatting; John Emburey; Phil Edmonds; Greg Thomas	Won
28	27 February 1987	Eden Park, Auckland	West Indies	1	41.4	105	6	2.52	Gordon Greenidge; Desmond Haynes; Richie Richardson; Viv Richards; Gus Logie; Tony Gray	Lost
29	12 March 1987‡	Lancaster Park, Christchurch	West Indies	1	12.3	50	6	4.00	Desmond Haynes; Richie Richardson; Gus Logie; Jeff Dujon; Joel Garner; Courtney Walsh	Won
30	15 December 1987	Adelaide Oval, Adelaide	Australia	2	42	68	5	1.61	Geoff Marsh; David Boon; Dean Jones; Craig McDermott; Bruce Reid	Drawn
31	26 December 1987 * † ‡	Melbourne Cricket Ground, Melbourne	Australia	2	44	109	5	2.47	David Boon; Geoff Marsh; Dean Jones; Mike Veletta; Peter Sleep	Drawn
32	26 December 1987 * † ‡	Melbourne Cricket Ground, Melbourne	Australia	4	31	67	5	2.16	Geoff Marsh; Allan Border; Peter Sleep; Greg Dyer; Tony Dodemaide	Drawn
33	12 November 1988	M. Chinnaswamy Stadium, Bangalore	India	1	30	65	5	2.16	Kris Srikkanth; Arun Lal; Dilip Vengsarkar; Mohammad Azharuddin; Woorkeri Raman	Lost
34	24 November 1988 †	Wankhede Stadium, Mumbai	India	2	20.5	49	6	2.35	Kris Srikkanth; Arun Lal; Kapil Dev; Kiran More; Arshad Ayub; Rashid Patel	Won
35	15 February 1990	Basin Reserve, Wellington	Australia	1	16.2	39	5	2.38	David Boon; Steve Waugh; Peter Taylor; Greg Campbell; Terry Alderman	Won
36	6 May 1990	Edgbaston, Birmingham	England	3	21	53	5	2.52	Robin Smith; Jack Russell; Chris Lewis; Eddie Hemmings; Devon Malcolm	Lost

== One Day Internationals ==
Five-wicket hauls in One Day Internationals
No.	Date	Ground	Against	Inn	Overs	Runs	Wkts	Econ	Batsmen	Result
1	9 December 1980 ‡	WACA Ground, Perth	India	1	9	32	5	3.55	Sunil Gavaskar; Gundappa Viswanath; Sandeep Patil; Kapil Dev; Karsan Ghavri	Lost
2	29 January 1981	Sydney Cricket Ground, Sydney	Australia	2	8.3	26	5	3.05	Graeme Wood; Martin Kent; Kim Hughes; Max Walker; Rodney Hogg	Won
3	13 June 1983‡	County Cricket Ground, Bristol	Sri Lanka	1	10.1	25	5	2.45	Sidath Wettimuny; Duleep Mendis; Arjuna Ranatunga; Ashantha de Mel; Rumesh Ratnayake	Won
4	18 February 1984	Lancaster Park, Christchurch	England	1	10	32	5	3.20	David Gower; Allan Lamb; Derek Randall; Ian Botham; Mike Gatting	Lost
5	6 February 1989	McLean Park, Napier	Pakistan	1	10	38	5	3.80	Shoaib Mohammad; Saleem Malik; Imran Khan; Ijaz Ahmed; Saleem Yousuf	Won
