= List of Test cricket records =

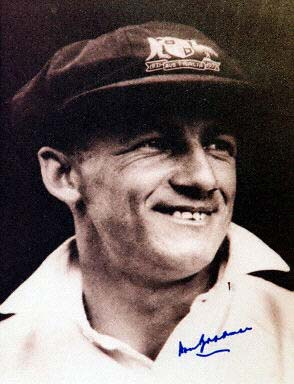
Donald Bradman, holder of several Test batting records, including highest batting average

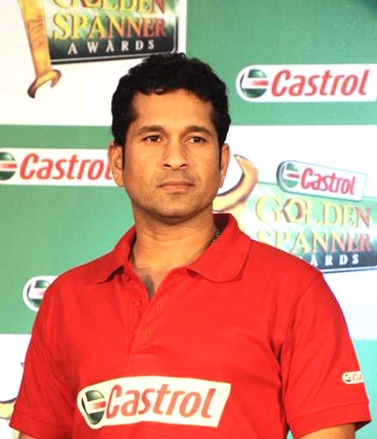
Sachin Tendulkar, the leading run-scorer and century maker in Test cricket

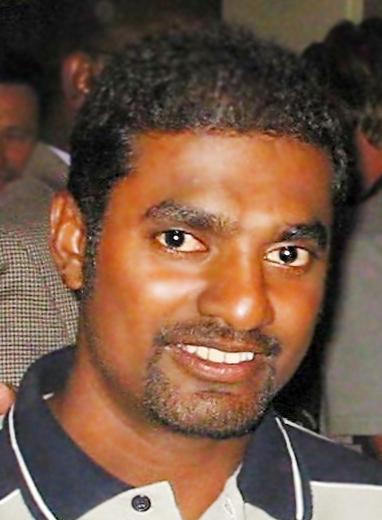
Muttiah Muralitharan, the highest wicket-taker in Test cricket

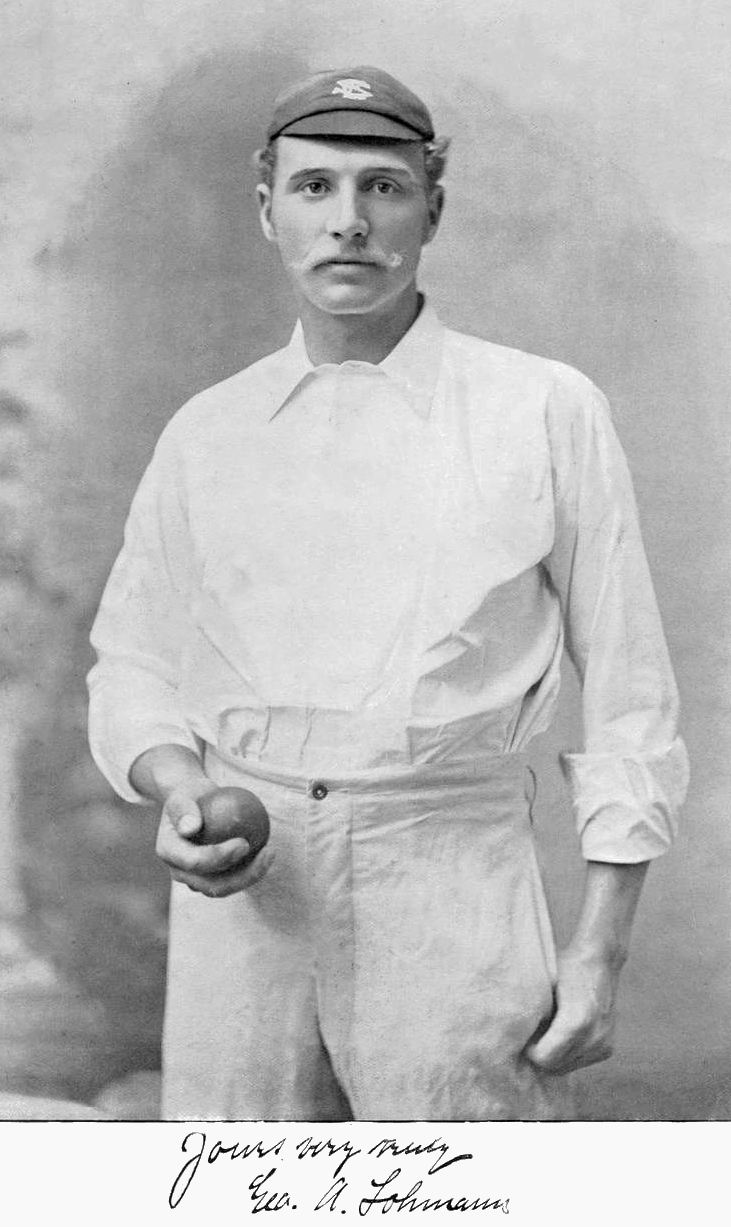
George Lohmann, the holder of best bowling average in Test cricket

Test cricket is played between international cricket teams who are Full Members of the International Cricket Council (ICC). Unlike One Day Internationals, Test matches consist of two innings per team, with no limit in the number of overs. Test cricket is first-class cricket, so statistics and records set in Test matches are also counted toward first-class records. The duration of Tests, currently limited to five days, has varied through Test history, ranging from three days to timeless matches. The earliest match now recognised as a Test was played between England and Australia in March 1877; since then there have been over 2,000 Tests played by 13 teams. The frequency of Tests has steadily increased partly because of the increase in the number of Test-playing countries, and partly as cricket boards seek to maximise their revenue.

Cricket is, by its nature, capable of generating large numbers of records and statistics. This list details the most significant team and individual records in Test cricket.

As of June 2025, the most successful team in Test cricket, in terms of both wins and win percentage, is Australia, having won 419 of their 874 Tests (47.94%). Excluding teams who have only played a small number of Tests, the least successful team is Zimbabwe.

Australian Donald Bradman, widely considered the greatest batsman of all time, holds several personal and partnership records. He scored the most runs in a series, has the most double centuries and was a part of the record 5th wicket partnership. His most significant record is his batting average of 99.94. One of cricket's most famous statistics, it still stands almost 40 runs higher than any other batsman's career average. Don Bradman is the only player in the world to have scored 5000 runs against a single opposition: 5028 runs against England.

In the Manchester Test of 1956, England spin bowler Jim Laker took 19 wickets for 90 runs (19–90) which set not only the Test record for best match figures but also the first-class one. In taking 10–53 in the second innings he became the first bowler to capture ten wickets in a Test match innings, and his analysis remains the best innings figures. Indian leg spinner Anil Kumble was the second bowler to take 10 wickets in an innings, claiming 10–74 against Pakistan in 1999. In December 2021, New Zealand spinner, Ajaz Patel became the third bowler to take 10 wickets in an innings. West Indies batsman Brian Lara has the highest individual score in Test cricket: he scored 400 not out against England in 2004 to surpass the innings of 380 by Matthew Hayden six months earlier. Lara had held the record before Hayden, with a score of 375 against England 10 years earlier. Pakistan's Misbah-ul-Haq holds the record of the fastest Test half century, scoring 50 runs from 21 balls. The record for the fastest Test century is held by New Zealand's Brendon McCullum, who scored 100 runs from 54 balls in his final Test match.

The trend of countries playing more Test matches in the modern era means that the aggregate lists are dominated by modern players. Sri Lankan spinner Muttiah Muralitharan became the highest Test wicket-taker in December 2007, when he passed Shane Warne's total of 708 wickets. Within a year, the equivalent batting record of highest run-scorer had also changed hands: Sachin Tendulkar surpassed the tally of 11,953 runs by Brian Lara. The record for most dismissals by a wicket-keeper is held by Mark Boucher of South Africa while the record for most catches by a fielder is held by Steve Smith.

== Listing criteria ==
In general the top five are listed in each category (except when there is a tie for the last place among the five, when all the tied record holders are noted).

== Listing notation ==
Team notation

- (300–3) indicates that a team scored 300 runs for three wickets and the innings was closed, either due to a successful run chase or if no playing time remained
- (300–3 d) indicates that a team scored 300 runs for three wickets, and declared its innings closed
- (300) indicates that a team scored 300 runs and was all out

Batting notation

- (100) indicates that a batsman scored 100 runs and was out
- (100*) indicates that a batsman scored 100 runs and was not out

Bowling notation

- (5–100) indicates that a bowler has captured 5 wickets while conceding 100 runs

Currently playing

- † indicates a current Test cricketer

Seasons

- Domestic cricket seasons in Australia, New Zealand, South Africa, India, Pakistan, Sri Lanka, Bangladesh, Zimbabwe and the West Indies may span two calendar years, and are by convention said to be played in (e.g.) "2008–09". A cricket season in England is described as a single year. e.g. "2009". An international Test series may be for a much shorter duration, and Cricinfo treats this issue by stating "any series or matches which began between May and September of any given year will appear in the relevant single year season and any that began between October and April will appear in the relevant cross-year season". In the record tables, a two-year span generally indicates that the record was set within a domestic season in one of the above named countries.

== Team records ==
=== Team wins, losses and draws ===
Team	First Test match	Matches	Won	Lost	Tied	Drawn	% Won	W/L Ratio
Afghanistan	14 June 2018	16	4	9	0	3	25.00	0.44
Australia	15 March 1877	887	428	238	2	219	48.36	1.79
Bangladesh	10 November 2000	165	28	116	0	21	16.96	0.24
England	15 March 1877	1,100	408	336	0	356	37.09	1.21
India	25 June 1932	601	187	188	1	225	31.11	0.99
Ireland	11 May 2018	13	3	10	0	0	23.07	0.30
New Zealand	10 January 1930	487	126	190	0	171	25.87	0.66
Pakistan	16 October 1952	476	154	155	0	167	32.35	0.99
South Africa	12 March 1889	483	194	163	0	126	40.16	1.19
Sri Lanka	17 February 1982	333	107	130	0	96	32.13	0.82
West Indies	23 June 1928	598	188	224	1	185	30.93	0.84
ICC World XI	14 October 2005	1	0	1	0	0	0.00	0.00
Zimbabwe	18 October 1992	132	17	84	0	31	12.87	0.20
Last updated: 20 November 2026

=== Result records ===
==== Greatest win margins (by innings) ====
Margin	Teams	Venue	Season	Test
Innings and 579 runs	England (903–7 d) beat Australia (201 & 123)	The Oval, London, England	1938	5th
Innings and 360 runs	Australia (652–7 d) beat South Africa (159 & 133)	Wanderers Stadium, Johannesburg, South Africa	2001–02	1st
Innings and 359 runs	New Zealand (601–3 d) beat Zimbabwe (125 & 117)	Queens Sports Club, Bulawayo, Zimbabwe	2025	2nd
Innings and 336 runs	West Indies (614–5 d) beat India (124 & 154)	Eden Gardens, Kolkata, India	1958–59	3rd
Innings and 332 runs	Australia (645) beat England (141 & 172)	The Gabba, Brisbane, Australia	1946–47	1st
Last updated: 9 August 2025

==== Greatest win margin (by runs) ====
Margin	Teams	Venue	Season	Test
675 runs	England (521 & 342–8 d) beat Australia (122 & 66)	Brisbane Showgrounds, Brisbane, Australia	1928–29	1st
562 runs	Australia (701 & 327) beat England (321 & 145)	The Oval, London, England	1934	5th
546 runs	Bangladesh (382 & 425-4 d) beat Afghanistan (146 & 115)	Sher-e-Bangla National Cricket Stadium, Mirpur, Bangladesh	2023	1st
530 runs	Australia (328 & 578) beat South Africa (205 & 171)	Melbourne Cricket Ground, Melbourne, Australia	1910–11	4th
492 runs	South Africa (488 & 344–6 d) beat Australia (221 & 119)	Wanderers Stadium, Johannesburg, South Africa	2018	4th
Last updated: 3 April 2018

==== Matches that finished with scores level ====
Result	Teams	Venue	Season	Test
Tie	Australia (505 & 232) vs West Indies (453 & 284)	The Gabba, Brisbane, Australia	1960–61	1st
Tie	India (397 & 347) vs Australia (574–7 d & 170–5 d)	M. A. Chidambaram Stadium, Madras, India	1986–87	1st
Draw	Zimbabwe (376 & 234) vs England (406 & 204–6)	Queens Sports Club, Bulawayo, Zimbabwe	1996–97	1st
Draw	India (482 & 242–9) vs West Indies (590 & 134)	Wankhede Stadium, Mumbai, India	2011–12	3rd
Last updated: 8 January 2021

==== Narrowest win margin (by wickets) ====
Margin	Teams	Venue	Season	Test
1 wicket	England (183 & 263–9) beat Australia (324 & 121)	The Oval, London, England	1902	5th
1 wicket	South Africa (91 & 287–9) beat England (184 & 190)	Old Wanderers, Johannesburg, South Africa	1905–06	1st
1 wicket	England (382 & 282–9) beat Australia (266 & 397)	Melbourne Cricket Ground, Melbourne, Australia	1907–08	2nd
1 wicket	England (183 & 173–9) beat South Africa (113 & 242)	Newlands Cricket Ground, Cape Town, South Africa	1922–23	2nd
1 wicket	Australia (216 & 260–9) beat West Indies (272 & 203)	Melbourne Cricket Ground, Melbourne, Australia	1951–52	4th
1 wicket	New Zealand (249 & 104–9) beat West Indies (140 & 212)	Carisbrook, Dunedin, New Zealand	1979–80	1st
1 wicket	Pakistan (256 & 315–9) beat Australia (337 & 232)	National Stadium, Karachi, Pakistan	1994–95	1st
1 wicket	West Indies (329 & 311–9) beat Australia (490 & 146)	Kensington Oval, Bridgetown, Barbados	1998–99	3rd
1 wicket	West Indies (273 & 216–9) beat Pakistan (269 & 219)	Antigua Recreation Ground, St. John's, Antigua and Barbuda	1999–00	3rd
1 wicket	Pakistan (175 & 262–9) beat Bangladesh (281 & 154)	Ibn-e-Qasim Bagh Stadium, Multan, Pakistan	2003	3rd
1 wicket	Sri Lanka (321 & 352–9) beat South Africa (361 & 311)	Paikiasothy Saravanamuttu Stadium, Colombo, Sri Lanka	2006	2nd
1 wicket	India (405 & 216–9) beat Australia (428 & 192)	Inderjit Singh Bindra Stadium, Mohali, India	2010–11	1st
1 wicket	Sri Lanka (191 & 304–9) beat South Africa (235 & 259)	Kingsmead Cricket Ground, Durban, South Africa	2018–19	1st
1 wicket	England (67 & 362–9) beat Australia (179 & 246)	Headingley Cricket Ground, Leeds, England	2019	3rd
1 wicket	West Indies (253 & 168–9) beat Pakistan (217 & 203)	Sabina Park, Kingston, Jamaica	2021	1st
Last updated: 15 August 2021

==== Narrowest win margin (by runs) ====
Margin	Teams	Venue	Season	Test
1 run	West Indies (252 & 146) beat Australia (213 & 184)	Adelaide Oval, Adelaide, Australia	1992–93	4th
1 run	New Zealand (209 & 483) beat England (435 & 256)	Basin Reserve, Wellington, New Zealand	2022–23	2nd
2 runs	England (407 & 182) beat Australia (308 & 279)	Edgbaston Cricket Ground, Birmingham, England	2005	2nd
3 runs	Australia (299 & 86) beat England (262 & 120)	Old Trafford Cricket Ground, Manchester, England	1902	4th
3 runs	England (284 & 294) beat Australia (287 & 288)	Melbourne Cricket Ground, Melbourne, Australia	1982–83	4th
Last updated: 28 February 2023

==== Victory after following-on ====
Margin	Teams	Venue	Season	Test
10 runs	England (325 & 437) beat Australia (586 & 166)	Sydney Cricket Ground, Sydney, Australia	1894–95	1st
18 runs	England (174 & 356) beat Australia (401–9 d & 111)	Headingley Cricket Ground, Leeds, England	1981	3rd
171 runs	India (171 & 657–7 d) beat Australia (445 & 212)	Eden Gardens, Kolkata, India	2000–01	2nd
1 run	New Zealand (209 & 483) beat England (435 & 256)	Basin Reserve, Wellington, New Zealand	2022–23	2nd
Last updated: 28 February 2023

==== Most consecutive wins ====
Wins	Team	First win	Last win
16	Australia	Zimbabwe at Harare, 14 October 1999	India at Mumbai, 27 February 2001
16	Australia	South Africa at Melbourne, 26 December 2005	India at Sydney, 2 January 2008
11	West Indies	Australia at Bridgetown, 30 March 1984	Australia at Adelaide, 7 December 1984
10	South Africa	West Indies at Providence, 15 August 2024	Zimbabwe at Bulawayo, 6 July 2025
9	Sri Lanka	India at Colombo, 29 August 2001	Pakistan at Lahore, 6 March 2002
9	South Africa	Australia at Durban, 15 March 2002	Bangladesh at Dhaka, 1 May 2003
Last updated: 1 July 2025

=== Team scoring records ===
==== Most runs in an innings ====
Score	Teams	Venue	Season	Test
952–6 d	Sri Lanka (v India)	R. Premadasa Stadium, Colombo, Sri Lanka	1997	1st
903–7 d	England (v Australia)	The Oval, London, England	1938	5th
849	England (v West Indies)	Sabina Park, Kingston, Jamaica	1929–30	4th
823–7 d	England (v Pakistan)	Multan Cricket Stadium, Multan, Pakistan	2024–25	1st
790–3 d	West Indies (v Pakistan)	Sabina Park, Kingston, Jamaica	1957–58	3rd
Last updated: 10 October 2024

==== Fewest runs in a completed innings ====
Runs	Teams	Venue	Season	Test
26	New Zealand (v England)	Eden Park, Auckland, New Zealand	1954–55	2nd
27	West Indies (v Australia)	Sabina Park, Kingston, Jamaica	2025	3rd
30	South Africa (v England)	St George's Park, Port Elizabeth, South Africa	1895–96	1st
30	South Africa (v England)	Edgbaston Cricket Ground, Birmingham, England	1924	1st
35	South Africa (v England)	Newlands Cricket Ground, Cape Town, South Africa	1898–99	2nd
Last updated: 14 July 2025

==== Highest fourth-innings totals to win ====
Score	Teams	Venue	Season	Test
418–7	West Indies (v Australia)	Antigua Recreation Ground, St. John's, Antigua and Barbuda	2002–03	4th
414–4	South Africa (v Australia)	WACA Ground, Perth, Australia	2008–09	1st
406–4	India (v West Indies)	Queen's Park Oval, Port of Spain, Trinidad and Tobago	1975–76	3rd
404–3	Australia (v England)	Headingley Cricket Ground, Leeds, England	1948	4th
395–7	West Indies (v Bangladesh)	Zohur Ahmed Chowdhury Stadium, Chittagong, Bangladesh	2020–21	1st
Last updated: 16 August 2023

=== Aggregate scoring records ===
==== Highest match aggregate ====
Score	Teams	Venue	Season	Test
1,981–35	South Africa (530 & 481) v England (316 & 654–5)	Kingsmead Cricket Ground, Durban, South Africa	1938–39	5th
1,815–34	England (849 & 272–9 d) v West Indies (286 & 408–5)	Sabina Park, Kingston, Jamaica	1929–30	4th
1,768–37	Pakistan (579 & 268) v England (657 & 264–7 d)	Rawalpindi Cricket Stadium, Rawalpindi, Pakistan	2022–23	1st
1,764–39	Australia (533 & 339–9) v West Indies (276 & 616)	Adelaide Oval, Adelaide, Australia	1968–69	4th
1,753–40	Australia (354 & 582) v England (447 & 370)	Adelaide Oval, Adelaide, Australia	1920–21	3rd
Last updated: 29 December 2022

== Individual records: Batting ==
=== Career ===
==== Most career runs ====
Runs	Player	Innings	Period
15,921	(India) Sachin Tendulkar	329	1989–2013
14,278	(England) Joe Root †	304	2012–present
13,378	(Australia) Ricky Ponting	287	1995–2012
13,289	(South Africa) Jacques Kallis	280	1995–2013
13,288	(India) Rahul Dravid	286	1996–2012
Last updated: 14 July 2026

==== Most career runs – progression of record ====
Runs	Player	Record held until	Duration of record
239	(Australia) Charles Bannerman	4 January 1882	4 years, 295 days
676	(England) George Ulyett (Note: Ulyett finished his career with 949 runs.)	13 August 1884	2 years, 222 days
860	(Australia) Billy Murdoch (Note: Murdoch finished his career with 908 runs.)	14 August 1886	2 years, 1 day
1,277	(England) Arthur Shrewsbury	23 January 1902	15 years, 162 days
1,293	(Australia) Joe Darling (Note: Darling finished his career with 1,657 runs.)	18 February 1902	26 days
1,366	(Australia) Syd Gregory (Note: Gregory finished his career with 2,282 runs.)	14 June 1902	116 days
1,531	(England) Archie MacLaren (Note: MacLaren finished his career with 1,931 runs.)	13 August 1902	60 days
3,412	(Australia) Clem Hill	27 December 1924	22 years, 136 days
5,410	(England) Jack Hobbs	29 June 1937	12 years, 184 days
7,249	(England) Wally Hammond	27 November 1970	33 years, 151 days
7,459	(England) Colin Cowdrey (Note: Cowdrey finished his career with 7,624 runs.)	23 March 1972	1 year, 117 days
8,032	(Cricket West Indies) Garfield Sobers	23 December 1981	9 years, 275 days
8,114	(England) Geoffrey Boycott	12 November 1983	1 year, 324 days
10,122	(India) Sunil Gavaskar	25 February 1993	9 years, 105 days
11,174	(Australia) Allan Border	25 November 2005	12 years, 273 days
11,953	(Cricket West Indies) Brian Lara	17 October 2008	2 years, 327 days
15,921	(India) Sachin Tendulkar	current	18 years, 34 days
Last updated: 15 June 2016

==== Most career runs at each batting position ====
Batting position	Player	Runs	Average
Opener	(England) Alastair Cook	11,845	44.87
Number 3	(Sri Lanka) Kumar Sangakkara	11,679	60.83
Number 4	(India) Sachin Tendulkar	13,492	54.40
Number 5	(Cricket West Indies) Shivnarine Chanderpaul	6,883	56.42
Number 6	(England) Ben Stokes	4,406	34.16
Number 7	(Australia) Adam Gilchrist	3,948	46.45
Number 8	(New Zealand) Daniel Vettori	2,227	39.77
Number 9	(Australia) Mitchell Starc †	1,470	22.62
Number 10	(Australia) Nathan Lyon †	938	12.68
Number 11	(England) James Anderson	687	7.72
Last updated: 14 July 2026

==== Highest career batting average ====
Average	Innings	Player	Runs	Period
99.94	80	(Australia) Donald Bradman	6,996	1928–1948
61.87	31	(Australia) Adam Voges	1,485	2015–2016
60.97	41	(South Africa) Graeme Pollock	2,256	1963–1970
60.83	40	(Cricket West Indies) George Headley	2,190	1930–1954
60.73	84	(England) Herbert Sutcliffe	4,555	1924–1935
Last updated: 14 July 2026; Qualification: At least 20 innings. Note: If the qualification is removed, the record Test batting average is Australian Kurtis Patterson's 144.00; Patterson made scores of 30 and 114 not out in his only two Test innings. A very few one-Test wonders have never been dismissed, leaving them without a defined Test batting average. Notable players who played only a single Test innings without a dismissal are Stuart Law (54*, innings declared) and Andy Lloyd (10*, retired hurt).

==== Most fours in career ====
Fours	Player	Innings
2058+	(India) Sachin Tendulkar	329
1654	(India) Rahul Dravid	286
1559	(Cricket West Indies) Brian Lara	232
1515	(England) Joe Root †	304
1509	(Australia) Ricky Ponting	287
Key: + : complete career records are not known.
Last updated: 14 July 2026

==== Most sixes in career ====
Sixes	Player	Innings
138	(England) Ben Stokes	220
107	(New Zealand) Brendon McCullum	176
100	(India) Rishabh Pant	90
100	(Australia) Adam Gilchrist	137
98	(New Zealand) Tim Southee	156
Last updated: 19 August 2026

==== Most ducks in career ====
Ducks	Player	Innings	Period
43	(Cricket West Indies) Courtney Walsh	185	1984–2001
39	(England) Stuart Broad	244	2007–2023
36	(New Zealand) Chris Martin	104	2000–2013
35	(Australia) Glenn McGrath	138	1993–2007
34	(India) Ishant Sharma	142	2007–2021
34	(Australia) Shane Warne	199	1992–2007
34	(England) James Anderson	265	2003–2024
Last updated: 11 October 2024

=== Series ===
==== Most runs in a series ====
Runs	Player	Opponent	Innings	Series
974	(Australia) Don Bradman	England	7	1930
905	(England) Wally Hammond	Australia	9	1928–29
839	(Australia) Mark Taylor	England	11	1989
834	(Australia) Neil Harvey	South Africa	9	1952–53
829	(Cricket West Indies) Viv Richards	England	7	1976
Last updated: 15 June 2016

=== Match ===
==== Most runs in a match ====
Runs	Scores	Player	Opponent	Venue	Season	Test
456	333 and 123	(England) Graham Gooch	India	Lord's, London, England	1990	1st
430	269 and 161	(India) Shubman Gill	England	Edgbaston, Birmingham, England	2025	2nd
426	334* and 92	(Australia) Mark Taylor	Pakistan	Arbab Niaz Stadium, Peshawar, Pakistan	1998–99	2nd
424	319 and 105	(Sri Lanka) Kumar Sangakkara	Bangladesh	Zohur Ahmed Chowdhury Stadium, Chittagong, Bangladesh	2013–14	2nd
400	400*	(Cricket West Indies) Brian Lara	England	Antigua Recreation Ground, St. John's, Antigua and Barbuda	2003–04	4th
Last updated: 5 July 2025

=== Innings ===
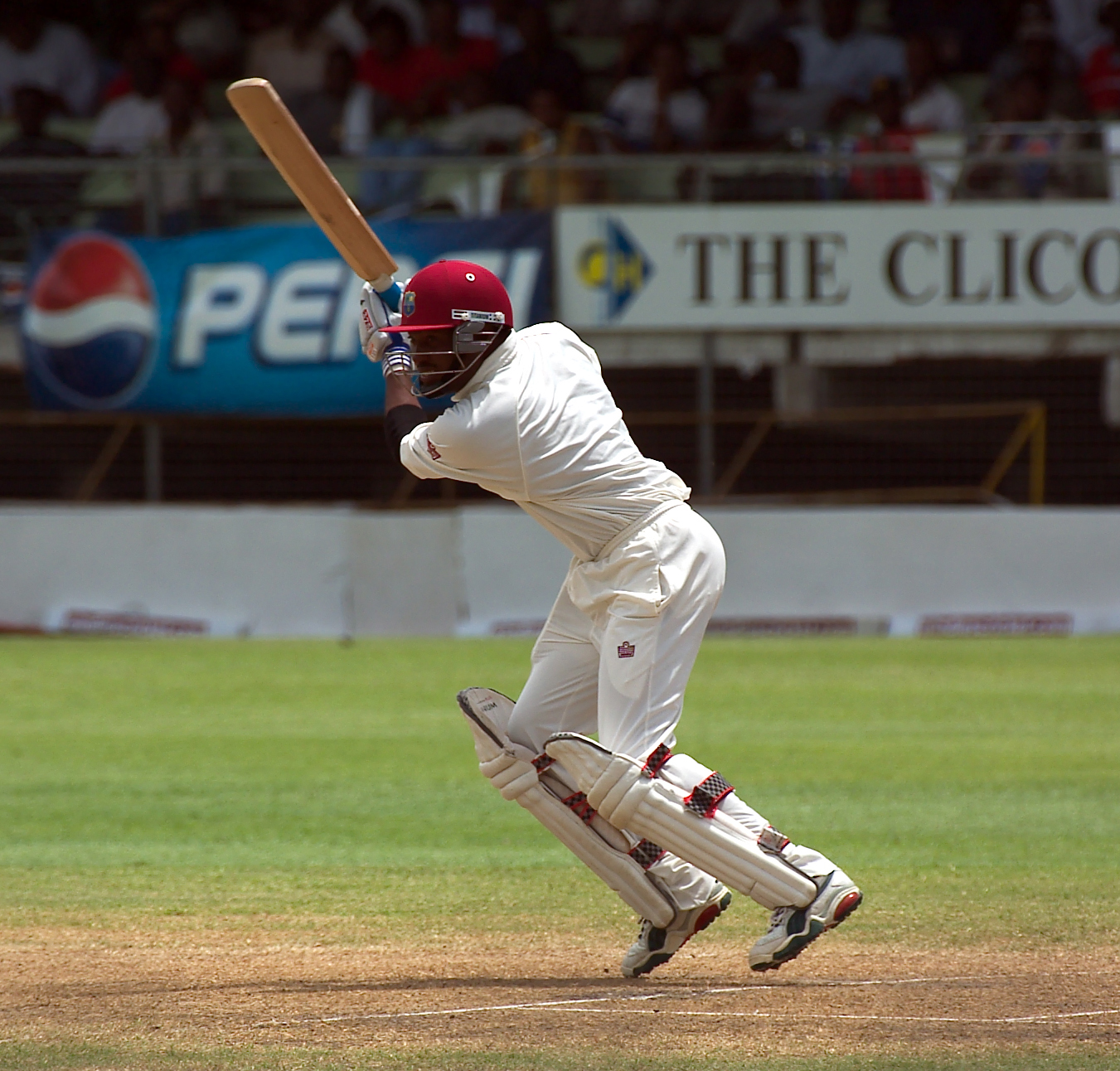
Brian Lara, the first to score 400 in International Cricket

==== Highest individual score in a single innings ====
Score	Player	Opponent	Venue	Season	Test
400*	(Cricket West Indies) Brian Lara	England	Antigua Recreation Ground, St. John's, Antigua and Barbuda	2003–04	4th
380	(Australia) Matthew Hayden	Zimbabwe	WACA Ground, Perth, Australia	2003–04	1st
375	(Cricket West Indies) Brian Lara	England	Antigua Recreation Ground, St. John's, Antigua and Barbuda	1993–94	5th
374	(Sri Lanka) Mahela Jayawardene	South Africa	Sinhalese Sports Club Cricket Ground, Colombo, Sri Lanka	2006	1st
367*	(South Africa) Wiaan Mulder	Zimbabwe	Queens Sports Club, Bulawayo, Zimbabwe	2025	2nd
Last updated: 7 July 2025

==== Highest individual score – progression of record ====
Score	Player	Opponent	Venue	Season	Test match number
165* (Note: Record achieved in the inaugural Test match.)	(Australia) Charles Bannerman	England	Melbourne Cricket Ground, Melbourne, Australia	1876–77	Test no. 1
211	(Australia) Billy Murdoch	England	The Oval, London, England	1884	Test no. 16
287	(England) R. E. Foster	Australia	Sydney Cricket Ground, Sydney, Australia	1903–04	Test no. 78
325	(England) Andy Sandham	West Indies	Sabina Park, Kingston, Jamaica	1929–30	Test no. 193
334	(Australia) Don Bradman	England	Headingley, Leeds, England	1930	Test no. 196
336*	(England) Wally Hammond	New Zealand	Eden Park, Auckland, New Zealand	1932–33	Test no. 226
364	(England) Len Hutton	Australia	The Oval, London, England	1938	Test no. 266
365*	(Cricket West Indies) Garfield Sobers	Pakistan	Sabina Park, Kingston, Jamaica	1957–58	Test no. 452
375	(Cricket West Indies) Brian Lara	England	Antigua Recreation Ground, St. John's, Antigua and Barbuda	1993–94	Test no. 1259
380	(Australia) Matthew Hayden	Zimbabwe	WACA Ground, Perth, Australia	2003–04	Test no. 1661
400*	(Cricket West Indies) Brian Lara	England	Antigua Recreation Ground, St. John's, Antigua and Barbuda	2003–04	Test no. 1696
Last updated: 15 June 2016

==== Most runs in an innings as captain ====
Highest individual score as captain
Score	Player	Opponent	Venue	Season	Test
400*	(Cricket West Indies) Brian Lara	England	Antigua Recreation Ground, St. John's, Antigua and Barbuda	2003–04	4th
374	(Sri Lanka) Mahela Jayawardene	South Africa	Singhalese Sports Club Cricket Ground, Colombo, Sri Lanka	2006	1st
367*	(South Africa) Wiaan Mulder	Zimbabwe	Queens Sports Club, Bulawayo, Zimbabwe	2025	2nd
334*	(Australia) Mark Taylor	Pakistan	Arbab Niaz Stadium, Peshawar, Pakistan	1998–99	2nd
333	(England) Graham Gooch	India	Lord's, London, England	1990	1st
Last updated: 7 July 2025

==== Most runs in an innings carrying the bat ====
Highest individual score
Score	Player	Opponent	Venue	Season	Test
264*	(New Zealand) Tom Latham	Sri Lanka	Basin Reserve, Wellington, New Zealand	2018–19	1st
244*	(England) Alastair Cook	Australia	Melbourne Cricket Ground, Melbourne, Australia	2017–18	4th
223*	(New Zealand) Glenn Turner	West Indies	Sabina Park, Kingston, Jamaica	1971–72	1st
216*	(Sri Lanka) Marvan Atapattu	Zimbabwe	Queens Sports Club, Bulawayo, Zimbabwe	1999–00	1st
206*	(Australia) Bill Brown	England	Lord's, London, England	1938	2nd
Last updated: 8 January 2019

==== Highest scores in a single innings at each batting position ====
Batting position	Player	Score	Opponent	Venue	Season	Test
Opener	(Australia) Matthew Hayden	380	Zimbabwe	WACA Ground, Perth, Australia	2003–04	1st
Number 3	(Cricket West Indies) Brian Lara	400*	England	Antigua Recreation Ground, St. John's, Antigua and Barbuda	2003–04	4th
Number 4	(Sri Lanka) Mahela Jayawardene	374	South Africa	Singhalese Sports Club Cricket Ground, Colombo, Sri Lanka	2006	1st
Number 5	(Australia) Michael Clarke	329*	India	Sydney Cricket Ground, Sydney, Australia	2011–12	2nd
Number 6	(England) Ben Stokes	258	South Africa	Newlands Cricket Ground, Cape Town, South Africa	2015–16	2nd
Number 7	(Australia) Don Bradman	270	England	Melbourne Cricket Ground, Melbourne, Australia	1936–37	3rd
Number 8	(Pakistan) Wasim Akram	257*	Zimbabwe	Sheikhupura Stadium, Sheikhupura, Pakistan	1996–97	1st
Number 9	(New Zealand) Ian Smith	173	India	Eden Park, Auckland, New Zealand	1989–90	3rd
Number 10	(England) Walter Read	117	Australia	The Oval, London, England	1884	3rd
Number 11	(Australia) Ashton Agar	98	England	Trent Bridge, Nottingham, England	2013	1st
Last updated: 18 November 2017

=== Over ===
==== Most runs in an over ====
Runs	Sequence	Batsman	Bowler	Venue	Season	Test
35	4–5W–7NB–4–4–4–6–1	(India) Jasprit Bumrah	(England) Stuart Broad	Edgbaston Cricket Ground, Birmingham, England	2022	5th
28	4–6–6–4–4–4	(Cricket West Indies) Brian Lara	(South Africa) Robin Peterson	Wanderers Stadium, Johannesburg, South Africa	2003–04	1st
28	4–6–2–4–6–6	(Australia) George Bailey	(England) James Anderson	WACA Ground, Perth, Australia	2013–14	3rd
28	4–4–4–6–6–b4	(South Africa) Keshav Maharaj	(England) Joe Root	St George's Park, Gqeberha, South Africa	2019–20	3rd
27	6–6–6–6–2–1	(Pakistan) Shahid Afridi	(India) Harbhajan Singh	Gaddafi Stadium, Lahore, Pakistan	2005–06	1st
27	6–4–4–4–6–3	(England) Harry Brook	(Pakistan) Zahid Mahmood	Rawalpindi Cricket Stadium, Rawalpindi, Pakistan	2022–23	1st
Last updated: 2 December 2022

=== Calendar year ===
==== Most runs in a calendar year ====
Runs	Player	Average	Year
1788	(Pakistan) Mohammad Yousuf	99.33	2006
1710	(Cricket West Indies) Viv Richards	90.00	1976
1708	(England) Joe Root	61.00	2021
1656	(South Africa) Graeme Smith	72.00	2008
1595	(Australia) Michael Clarke	106.33	2012
Last updated: 31 December 2021

=== Centuries ===
==== Most Test centuries ====
Centuries	Player	Matches	Innings
51	(India) Sachin Tendulkar	200	329
45	(South Africa) Jacques Kallis	166	280
41	(Australia) Ricky Ponting	168	287
41	(England) Joe Root †	164	304
38	(Sri Lanka) Kumar Sangakkara	134	233
Last updated: 14 July 2026

==== Fastest Test centuries ====
No. of balls	Player	Opponent	Venue	Season	Test
54	(New Zealand) Brendon McCullum	Australia	Hagley Oval, Christchurch, New Zealand	2015–16	2nd
56	(Cricket West Indies) Viv Richards	England	Antigua Recreation Ground, St. John's, Antigua and Barbuda	1985–86	5th
56	(Pakistan) Misbah-ul-Haq	Australia	Sheikh Zayed Cricket Stadium, Abu Dhabi, United Arab Emirates	2014–15	2nd
57	(Australia) Adam Gilchrist	England	WACA Ground, Perth, Australia	2006–07	3rd
67	(Australia) Jack Gregory	South Africa	Old Wanderers, Johannesburg, South Africa	1921–22	2nd
Last updated: 15 June 2016

==== Most Test double centuries ====
Double centuries	Player	Matches
12	(Australia) Donald Bradman	52
11	(Sri Lanka) Kumar Sangakkara	130
9	(Cricket West Indies) Brian Lara	131
7	(England) Wally Hammond	85
7	(India) Virat Kohli	123
7	(Sri Lanka) Mahela Jayawardene	149
Last updated: 11 October 2024

==== Fastest Test double centuries ====
No. of balls	Player	Opponent	Venue	Season	Test
153	(New Zealand) Nathan Astle	England	Lancaster Park, Christchurch, New Zealand	2001–02	1st
163	(England) Ben Stokes	South Africa	Newlands Cricket Ground, Cape Town, South Africa	2015–16	2nd
168	(India) Virender Sehwag	Sri Lanka	Brabourne Stadium, Mumbai, India	2009–10	3rd
182	(India) Virender Sehwag	Pakistan	Gaddafi Stadium, Lahore, Pakistan	2005–06	1st
186	(New Zealand) Brendon McCullum	Pakistan	Sharjah Cricket Stadium, Sharjah, United Arab Emirates	2014–15	3rd
Last updated: 4 March 2019

==== Most Test triple centuries ====
Triple centuries	Player	Matches
2	(Australia) Donald Bradman	52
2	(India) Virender Sehwag	104
2	(Cricket West Indies) Chris Gayle	103
2	(Cricket West Indies) Brian Lara	131
1	(25 players)	
Last updated: 14 July 2025

==== Most Test quadruple centuries ====
Quadruple centuries	Player	Matches
1	(Cricket West Indies) Brian Lara	131
Last updated: 15 June 2016

=== Half-centuries ===
==== Most Test 50+ scores ====
50+	Player	Matches	Innings
119	(India) Sachin Tendulkar	200	329
108	(England) Joe Root †	166	304
103	(South Africa) Jacques Kallis	166	280
103	(Australia) Ricky Ponting	168	287
99	(India) Rahul Dravid	164	286
Last updated: 14 July 2026

==== Fastest Test half-centuries ====
No. of balls	Player	Opponent	Venue	Season	Test
21	(Pakistan) Misbah-ul-Haq	Australia	Sheikh Zayed Stadium, Abu Dhabi, United Arab Emirates	2014–15	2nd
23	(Australia) David Warner	Pakistan	Sydney Cricket Ground, Sydney, Australia	2016–17	3rd
24	(South Africa) Jacques Kallis	Zimbabwe	Newlands Cricket Ground, Cape Town, South Africa	2004–05	1st
24	(England) Ben Stokes	West Indies	Edgbaston Cricket Ground, Birmingham, England	2024	3rd
25	(Cricket West Indies) Shane Shillingford	New Zealand	Sabina Park, Kingston, Jamaica	2014	1st
Last updated: 28 July 2024
Note: Misbah's is also the fastest in minutes, at 24 minutes. Some records credit Victor Trumper with a 22-minute half-century against South Africa at Johannesburg in 1902-03, but this only counted the time he was on strike: the total time for his fifty is recorded as 45 minutes.

== Individual records: Bowling ==
=== Career ===
==== Most wickets in a career ====
Wickets	Player	Matches	Average
800	(Sri Lanka) Muttiah Muralitharan	133	22.72
708	(Australia) Shane Warne	145	25.41
704	(England) James Anderson	188	26.45
619	(India) Anil Kumble	132	29.65
604	(England) Stuart Broad	167	27.68
Last updated: 12 July 2024

==== Most wickets in a career – Progression of record ====
Wickets	Player	Matches	Average	Record held until	Duration of record
8 (Note: Allen Hill took the first Test wicket, but only two in the First Test match. Alfred Shaw (3/51 & 5/35) and Tom Kendall (1/54 & 7/55) both took eight wickets, but as Australia batted first Shaw was the first to take five wickets in an innings and the first to take eight Test wickets. Kendall overtook him in the Second Test and Shaw subsequently increased his total to 12 wickets (15.35) in seven Tests)	(England) Alfred Shaw	1	10.75	31 March 1877	16 days
14	(Australia) Tom Kendall	2	15.35	4 January 1879	1 year, 279 days
94 (Note: Johnny Briggs equalled Fred Spofforth's record of 94 Test wickets on 29 December 1894 in the Second Test at Melbourne, as did Charles Turner two days later. Briggs overtook Turner and Spofforth in the Third Test at Adelaide, which Turner missed, and became the first man to claim 100 Test wickets on 1 February 1895 in the Fourth Test at Sydney. Turner became the second three days later and ended with a total of 101 wickets (16.53) in 17 Tests)	(Australia) Fred Spofforth	18	18.41	12 January 1895	16 years, 8 days
100	(England) Johnny Briggs	25	13.51	4 February 1895	33 days
101	(Australia) Charles Turner	17	16.53	2 March 1895	26 days
103	(England) Johnny Briggs	26	13.92	21 March 1896	1 year, 19 days
112 (Note: Johnny Briggs equalled George Lohmann's record of 112 Test wickets on 3 January 1898 in the Second Test at Melbourne and overtook him in the next match at Adelaide.)	(England) George Lohmann	18	10.75	14 January 1898	1 year, 299 days
118	(England) Johnny Briggs	33	17.75	2 January 1904	5 years, 353 days
141	(Australia) Hugh Trumble	32	21.78	13 December 1913	9 years, 345 days
189	(England) Sydney Barnes	27	16.43	4 January 1936	22 years, 22 days
216	(Australia) Clarrie Grimmett	37	24.21	24 July 1953	17 years, 201 days
236	(England) Alec Bedser	51	24.89	26 January 1963	9 years, 186 days
242 (Note: Fred Trueman overtook Brian Statham's then record of 242 Test wickets and Statham subsequently increased his total to 252 wickets (24.84) in 70 Tests)	(England) Brian Statham	67	24.27	15 March 1963	48 days
307	(England) Fred Trueman	67	21.57	1 February 1976	12 years, 323 days
309	(Cricket West Indies) Lance Gibbs	79	29.09	27 December 1981	5 years, 329 days
355	(Australia) Dennis Lillee	70	23.92	21 August 1986	4 years, 237 days
373 (Note: Richard Hadlee overtook Ian Botham's then record of 373 Test wickets and Botham subsequently increased his total to 383 wickets (28.40) in 102 Tests)	(England) Ian Botham	94	27.86	12 November 1988	2 years, 83 days
431	(New Zealand) Richard Hadlee	86	22.29	8 February 1994	5 years, 88 days
434	(India) Kapil Dev	131	29.64	27 March 2000	6 years, 48 days
519	(Cricket West Indies) Courtney Walsh	132	24.44	8 May 2004	4 years, 42 days
532 (Note: Shane Warne overtook Muttiah Muralitharan's then record of 532 Test wickets whilst both were still playing, and Muralitharan later regained the record when he passed Warne's final tally of 708 wickets.)	(Sri Lanka) Muttiah Muralitharan	91	22.87	15 October 2004	160 days
708	(Australia) Shane Warne	145	25.41	3 December 2007	3 years, 49 days
800	(Sri Lanka) Muttiah Muralitharan	133	22.72	Current	18 years, 352 days

==== Fastest to multiples of 50 wickets ====
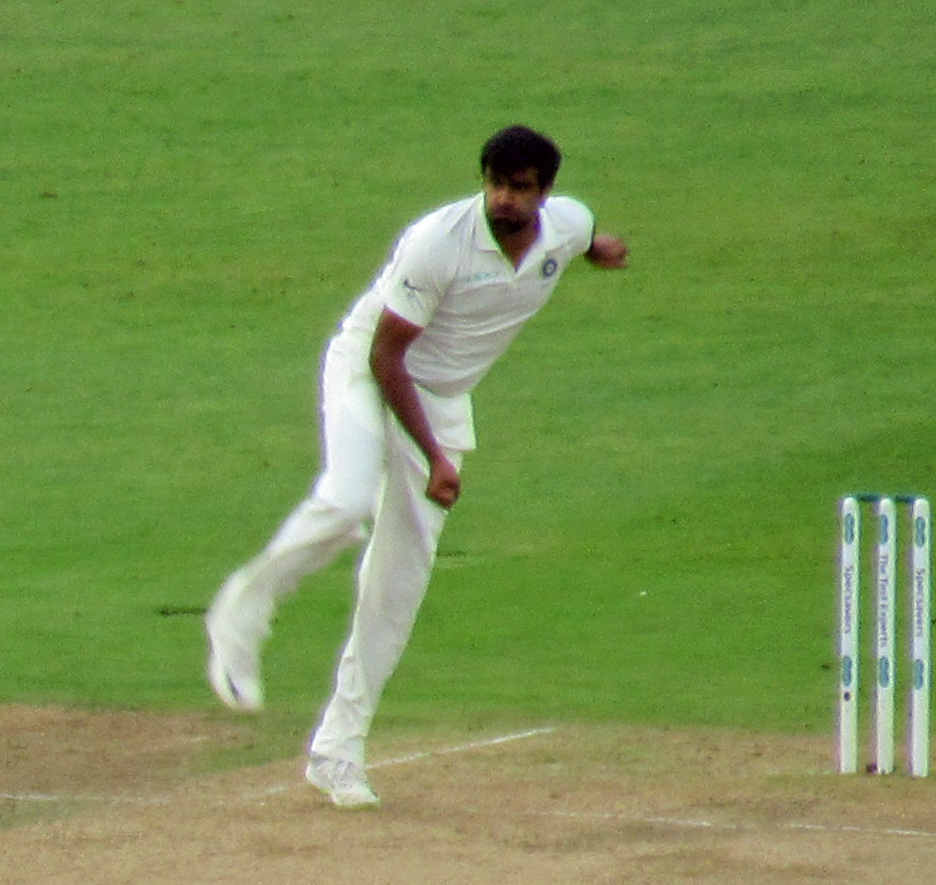
Ravichandran Ashwin holds the world record for reaching 250, 300 and 350 Test wickets the fastest.

Wickets	Bowler	Match	Record Date	Reference
50	(Australia) Charlie Turner	6	30 August 1888	
100	(England) George Lohmann	16	2 March 1896	
150	(England) Sydney Barnes	24	13 December 1913	
200	(Pakistan) Yasir Shah	33	3 December 2018	
250	(India) Ravichandran Ashwin	45	9 February 2017	
300	(India) Ravichandran Ashwin	54	24 November 2017	
350	(Sri Lanka) Muttiah Muralitharan	66	6 September 2001	
350	(India) Ravichandran Ashwin	66	2 October 2019	
400	(Sri Lanka) Muttiah Muralitharan	72	12 January 2002	
450	(Sri Lanka) Muttiah Muralitharan	80	3 May 2003	
500	(Sri Lanka) Muttiah Muralitharan	87	16 March 2004	
550	(Sri Lanka) Muttiah Muralitharan	94	12 September 2005	
600	(Sri Lanka) Muttiah Muralitharan	101	8 March 2006	
650	(Sri Lanka) Muttiah Muralitharan	108	4 August 2006	
700	(Sri Lanka) Muttiah Muralitharan	113	11 July 2007	
750	(Sri Lanka) Muttiah Muralitharan	122	31 July 2008	
800	(Sri Lanka) Muttiah Muralitharan	133	18 July 2010	
Last updated: 19 January 2021

==== Best career bowling average ====
Average	Player	Runs conceded	Wickets
10.75	(England) George Lohmann	1,205	112
12.70	(England) / (Australia) J. J. Ferris (Note: John Ferris was one of a few cricketers to play Test cricket for more than one country. He played in eight Tests for Australia from 1886–87 and a single Test for England in South Africa in 1891–92.)	775	61
15.54	(England) Billy Barnes	793	51
16.42	(England) Billy Bates	821	50
16.43	(England) Sydney Barnes	3106	189
Last updated: 19 February 2022
Qualification: At least 2,000 balls bowled.
Note: If the qualification is removed, the best career average record is at 0.00 runs per wicket (i.e. no runs were conceded). This record is shared by Englishmen A N Hornby, Wilf Barber and New Zealander, Bruce Murray who each took one wicket without conceding a run

==== Best career strike rate ====
Strike rate	Player	Balls	Wickets
34.2	(England) George Lohmann	3,830	112
35.8	(Cricket West Indies) Shamar Joseph †	2,076	58
37.7	(Australia) / (England) J. J. Ferris	2,302	61
38.0	(India) Kuldeep Yadav †	3,000	79
38.3	(South Africa) Marco Jansen †	3,408	89
Last updated: 14 July 2026
Qualification: 2000 balls bowled.

==== Most 5 wickets in an innings ====
5 wickets in an innings	Player	Matches
67	(Sri Lanka) Muttiah Muralitharan	133
37	(India) Ravichandran Ashwin	106
37	(Australia) Shane Warne	145
36	(New Zealand) Richard Hadlee	86
35	(India) Anil Kumble	132
Last updated: 18 December 2024

==== Most 10 wickets in a match ====
10 wickets in a match	Player	Matches
22	(Sri Lanka) Muttiah Muralitharan	133
10	(Australia) Shane Warne	145
9	(New Zealand) Richard Hadlee	86
9	(Sri Lanka) Rangana Herath	93
8	(India) Anil Kumble	132
8	(India) Ravichandran Ashwin	106
Last updated: 18 December 2024

=== Series ===
==== Most wickets in a series ====
Wickets	Tests	Player	Opponent	Series
49	4	(England) Sydney Barnes	South Africa	1913–14
46	5	(England) Jim Laker	Australia	1956
44	5	(Australia) Clarrie Grimmett	South Africa	1935–36
42	6	(Australia) Terry Alderman	England	1981
41	6	(Australia) Terry Alderman	England	1989
41	6	(Australia) Rodney Hogg	England	1978–79
Last updated: 15 June 2016

=== Match ===
==== Best bowling figures in a match ====
Bowling figures	Player	Opponent	Venue	Season	Test
19–90	(England) Jim Laker	Australia	Old Trafford Cricket Ground, Manchester, England	1956	4th
17–159	(England) Sydney Barnes	South Africa	Old Wanderers, Johannesburg, South Africa	1913–14	2nd
16–136	(India) Narendra Hirwani	West Indies	M. A. Chidambaram Stadium, Chennai, India	1987–88	4th
16–137	(Australia) Bob Massie	England	Lord's, London, England	1972	2nd
16–220	(Sri Lanka) Muttiah Muralitharan	England	The Oval, London, England	1998	1st
Last updated: 15 June 2016

==== Best bowling figures in a match as captain ====
Bowling figures	Player	Opponent	Venue	Season	Test
13–55	(Cricket West Indies) Courtney Walsh	New Zealand	Basin Reserve, Wellington, New Zealand	1994–95	2nd
13–135	(Pakistan) Waqar Younis	Zimbabwe	Southend Club Cricket Stadium, Karachi, Pakistan	1993–94	1st
13–152	(Sri Lanka) Rangana Herath	Zimbabwe	Harare Sports Club, Harare, Zimbabwe	2016–17	2nd
12–100	(Pakistan) Fazal Mahmood	West Indies	Bangabandhu National Stadium, Dhaka, Bangladesh	1958–59	2nd
11–79	(Pakistan) Imran Khan	India	National Stadium, Karachi, Pakistan	1982–83	2nd
Last updated: 15 June 2016

=== Innings ===
==== Best bowling figures in an innings ====
Bowling figures	Player	Opponent	Venue	Season	Test
10–53	(England) Jim Laker (Note: Jim Laker achieved figures of 9-37 and 10-53 in the same Test match in 1956 against Australia at Old Trafford, in the first and second innings respectively.)	Australia	Old Trafford, Manchester, England	1956	4th
10–74	(India) Anil Kumble	Pakistan	Feroz Shah Kotla Ground, Delhi, India	1998–99	2nd
10–119	(New Zealand) Ajaz Patel	India	Wankhede Stadium, Mumbai, India	2021–22	2nd
9–28	(England) George Lohmann	South Africa	Old Wanderers, Johannesburg, South Africa	1895–96	2nd
9–37	(England) Jim Laker	Australia	Old Trafford, Manchester, England	1956	4th
Last updated: 4 December 2021

==== Best bowling figures in an innings – progression of record ====
Bowling figures	Player	Opponent	Venue	Season
7–55 (Note: Record achieved in the inaugural Test match.)	(Australia) Tom Kendall	England	Melbourne Cricket Ground, Melbourne, Australia	1876–77
7–44	(Australia) Fred Spofforth	England	The Oval, London, England	1882
7–28	(England) Billy Bates	Australia	Melbourne Cricket Ground, Melbourne, Australia	1882–83
8–35	(England) George Lohmann	Australia	Sydney Cricket Ground, Sydney, Australia	1886–87
8–11	(England) Johnny Briggs	South Africa	Newlands Cricket Ground, Cape Town, South Africa	1888–89
8–7	(England) George Lohmann	South Africa	St George's Park Cricket Ground, Gqeberha, South Africa	1895–96
9–28	(England) George Lohmann	South Africa	Old Wanderers, Johannesburg, South Africa	1895–96
10–53	(England) Jim Laker	Australia	Old Trafford Cricket Ground, Manchester, England	1956
Last updated: 15 June 2016
Note: Calculated at the conclusion of each Test.

==== Best bowling figures in an innings as captain ====
Bowling figures	Player	Opponent	Venue	Season
9–83	(India) Kapil Dev	West Indies	Sardar Patel Stadium, Ahmedabad, India	1983–84
8–60	(Pakistan) Imran Khan	India	National Stadium, Karachi, Pakistan	1982–83
8–63	(Sri Lanka) Rangana Herath	Zimbabwe	Harare Sports Club, Harare, Zimbabwe	2016–17
8–106	(India) Kapil Dev	Australia	Adelaide Oval, Adelaide, Australia	1985–86
7–37	(Cricket West Indies) Courtney Walsh	New Zealand	Basin Reserve, Wellington, New Zealand	1994–95
Last updated: 16 March 2017

== Individual records: Fielding ==
=== Career ===
==== Most catches in a career ====
Catches	Player	Matches	Innings	Catches per Innings
224	(Australia) Steve Smith †	126	241	0.93
220	(England) Joe Root †	169	323	0.68
210	(India) Rahul Dravid	164	301	0.69
205	(Sri Lanka) Mahela Jayawardene	149	270	0.75
200	(South Africa) Jacques Kallis	166	315	0.63
Last updated: 13 October 2026
Note: This list excludes catches made as wicket-keeper.

=== Match ===
==== Most catches in a match ====
Catches	Player	Opponent	Venue	Season	Test
9	(South Africa) Aiden Markram	India	Assam Cricket Association Stadium, Guwahati, India	2025–26	2nd
8	(India) Ajinkya Rahane	Sri Lanka	Galle International Stadium, Galle, Sri Lanka	2015	1st
7	(Australia) Greg Chappell	England	WACA Ground, Perth, Australia	1974–75	2nd
7	(India) Yajurvindra Singh	England	M. Chinnaswamy Stadium, Bengaluru, India	1976–77	4th
7	(Sri Lanka) Hashan Tillakaratne	New Zealand	Singhalese Sports Club, Colombo, Sri Lanka	1992–93	2nd
7	(New Zealand) Stephen Fleming	Zimbabwe	Harare Sports Club, Harare, Zimbabwe	1997–98	1st
7	(Australia) Matthew Hayden	Sri Lanka	Galle International Stadium, Galle, Sri Lanka	2003–04	1st
7	(India) KL Rahul	England	Trent Bridge, Nottingham, England	2018	3rd
Last updated: 22 November 2025

== Individual records: Wicket-keeping ==
=== Career ===
==== Most dismissals in a career ====
Dismissals	Catches	Stumpings	Player	Matches
555	532	23	(South Africa) Mark Boucher	147
416	379	37	(Australia) Adam Gilchrist	96
395	366	29	(Australia) Ian Healy	119
355	343	12	(Australia) Rod Marsh	96
294	256	38	(India) MS Dhoni	90
Last updated: 15 June 2016

==== Most catches in a career ====
Catches	Player	Matches
532	(South Africa) Mark Boucher	147
379	(Australia) Adam Gilchrist	96
366	(Australia) Ian Healy	119
343	(Australia) Rod Marsh	96
265	(Cricket West Indies) Jeff Dujon	81
Last updated: 15 June 2016

==== Most stumpings in a career ====
Stumpings	Player	Matches
52	(Australia) Bert Oldfield	54
46	(England) Godfrey Evans	91
38	(India) Syed Kirmani	88
38	(India) MS Dhoni	90
37	(Australia) Adam Gilchrist	96
Last updated: 15 June 2016

=== Innings ===
==== Most dismissals in an innings ====
Dismissals	Player	Opponent	Venue	Season	Test
8	(Bangladesh) Litton Das	South Africa	Wanderers Stadium, Johannesburg, South Africa	2026–27	1st
7	(Pakistan) Wasim Bari	New Zealand	Eden Park, Auckland, New Zealand	1978–79	3rd
7	(England) Bob Taylor	India	Wankhede Stadium, Bombay, India	1979–80	1st
7	(New Zealand) Ian Smith	Sri Lanka	Seddon Park, Hamilton, New Zealand	1990–91	2nd
7	(Cricket West Indies) Ridley Jacobs	Australia	Melbourne Cricket Ground, Melbourne, Australia	2000–01	4th
7	(Cricket West Indies) Joshua Da Silva	South Africa	Centurion Park, Centurion, South Africa	2022–23	1st
Last updated: 18 November 2026

== Individual records: As an all-rounder ==
=== Career ===
==== Most occasions of taking 5 wickets in an innings and scoring a century in the same Test match ====
Matches	Player	Period
5	(England) Ian Botham	1977–1992
4	(India) Ravichandran Ashwin	2011–2024
2	(Cricket West Indies) Garfield Sobers	1954–1974
2	(Pakistan) Mushtaq Mohammad	1959–1979
2	(South Africa) Jacques Kallis	1995–2013
2	(Bangladesh) Shakib Al Hasan	2007–2024
2	(India) Ravindra Jadeja †	2012–present
Last updated: 25 June 2025

==== Most occasions of taking 10 wickets and scoring a century in the same Test match ====
Matches	Player	Runs	Wickets	Opponent	Venue	Season	Test
1	(England) Ian Botham	114 (Note: Botham and Imran only batted once in their matches.)	13/109	India	Wankhede Stadium, Mumbai, India	1979–80	1st
1	(Pakistan) Imran Khan	117	11/180	India	Iqbal Stadium, Faisalabad, Pakistan	1982–83	3rd
1	(Bangladesh) Shakib Al Hasan	137 (Note: Shakib batted twice in his match, but only scored 6 in the other innings.)	10/124	Zimbabwe	Sheikh Abu Naser Stadium, Khulna, Bangladesh	2014–15	2nd
Last updated: 16 September 2016
Notes: Alan Davidson (Australia), in the tied 1st Test at Brisbane against the West Indies in 1960–61, was the first man to score 100 runs and take 10 wickets in a match (and is the only other player to achieve this so far), but without a century: his two scores with the bat were 44 and 80, in addition to 11 wickets (5/135 and 6/87).

== Individual records: Other ==
=== Career ===
==== Most matches played ====
Matches	Player	Period
200	(India) Sachin Tendulkar	1989–2013
188	(England) James Anderson	2003–2024
168	(Australia) Steve Waugh	1985–2004
168	(Australia) Ricky Ponting	1995–2012
167	(England) Stuart Broad	2007–2023
Last updated: 11 March 2024

==== Most matches played as captain ====
Matches	Player	Won	Lost	Drawn	Tied
109	(South Africa) Graeme Smith	53	29	27	0
93	(Australia) Allan Border	32	22	38	1
80	(New Zealand) Stephen Fleming	28	27	25	0
77	(Australia) Ricky Ponting	48	16	13	0
74	(Cricket West Indies) Clive Lloyd	36	12	26	0
Last updated: 15 June 2016

==== Most matches won as captain ====
Won	Player	Lost	Drawn	Ties	Matches
53	(South Africa) Graeme Smith	26	26	0	109
48	(Australia) Ricky Ponting	16	13	0	77
41	(Australia) Steve Waugh	9	7	0	57
40	(India) Virat Kohli	17	11	0	68
36	(Cricket West Indies) Clive Lloyd	12	26	0	74
Last updated: 14 January 2022

==== Most Player-of-the-Match awards ====
No. of Awards	Player	Matches	Period
23	(South Africa) Jacques Kallis	166	1995–2013
19	(Sri Lanka) Muttiah Muralitharan	133	1992–2010
17	(Pakistan) Wasim Akram	104	1985–2002
17	(Australia) Shane Warne	145	1992–2007
16	(Sri Lanka) Kumar Sangakkara	134	2000–2015
16	(Australia) Ricky Ponting	168	1995–2012
Last updated: 29 December 2019

==== Most Player-of-the-series awards ====
No. of Awards	Player	Matches	Series	Period
11	(India) Ravichandran Ashwin	106	44	2011–2024
11	(Sri Lanka) Muttiah Muralitharan	133	61	1992–2010
9	(South Africa) Jacques Kallis	166	61	1995–2013
8	(Pakistan) Imran Khan	88	28	1971–1992
8	(New Zealand) Richard Hadlee	86	33	1973–1990
8	(Australia) Shane Warne	145	46	1992–2007
Last updated: 18 December 2024

== Partnership records ==
=== Career ===
==== Most overall partnership runs by a pair ====
Runs	Partnership	Innings	Highest	Average	100s/50s	Career span
6,920	(India) Rahul Dravid & (India) Sachin Tendulkar	143	249	50.51	20/29	1996–2012
6,554	(Sri Lanka) Mahela Jayawardene & (Sri Lanka) Kumar Sangakkara	120	624	56.5	19/27	2000–2015
6,482	(Cricket West Indies) Gordon Greenidge & (Cricket West Indies) Desmond Haynes	148	298	47.31	16/26	1978–1991
6,081	(Australia) Matthew Hayden & (Australia) Justin Langer	122	255	51.53	14/28	1997–2007
5,253	(England) Alastair Cook & (England) Andrew Strauss	132	229	40.4	14/21	2006–2012
Last updated: 11 October 2022

=== Innings ===
==== Highest partnerships ====
Runs	Partnership		Opposition	Venue	Season	Test	Wicket
624	(Sri Lanka) Kumar Sangakkara (287)	(Sri Lanka) Mahela Jayawardene (374)	South Africa	Singhalese Sports Club Cricket Ground, Colombo, Sri Lanka	2006	1st	3rd
576	(Sri Lanka) Sanath Jayasuriya (340)	(Sri Lanka) Roshan Mahanama (225)	India	R. Premadasa Stadium, Colombo, Sri Lanka	1997	1st	2nd
467	(New Zealand) Andrew Jones (186)	(New Zealand) Martin Crowe (299)	Sri Lanka	Basin Reserve, Wellington, New Zealand	1990–91	1st	3rd
454	(England) Joe Root (262)	(England) Harry Brook (317)	Pakistan	Multan Cricket Stadium, Multan, Pakistan	2024–25	1st	4th
451	(Australia) Bill Ponsford (266)	(Australia) Donald Bradman (244)	England	The Oval, London, England	1934	5th	2nd
451	(Pakistan) Mudassar Nazar (231)	(Pakistan) Javed Miandad (280*)	India	Niaz Stadium, Hyderabad, Pakistan	1982–83	4th	3rd
Last updated: 10 October 2024

==== Highest partnership (for each wicket) ====
Wicket	Runs	Team	Partnership		Opposition	Venue	Season
1st wicket	415	South Africa	Graeme Smith (232)	Neil McKenzie (226)	Bangladesh	Zohur Ahmed Chowdhury Stadium, Chittagong, Bangladesh	2008
2nd wicket	576	Sri Lanka	Sanath Jayasuriya (340)	Roshan Mahanama (225)	India	R. Premadasa Stadium, Colombo, Sri Lanka	1997–98
3rd wicket	624	Sri Lanka	Kumar Sangakkara (287)	Mahela Jayawardene (374)	South Africa	Singhalese Sports Club Cricket Ground, Colombo, Sri Lanka	2006
4th wicket	454	England	Joe Root (262)	Harry Brook (317)	Pakistan	Multan Cricket Stadium, Multan, Pakistan	2024–25
5th wicket	405	Australia	Sid Barnes (234)	Donald Bradman (234)	England	Sydney Cricket Ground, Sydney, Australia	1946–47
6th wicket	401	West Indies	Amir Jangoo (233)	Roston Chase (194)	Sri Lanka	Sir Vivian Richards Stadium, North Sound, Antigua and Barbuda	2026
7th wicket	347	West Indies	Denis Atkinson (219)	Clairmonte Depeiaza (122)	Australia	Kensington Oval, Bridgetown, Barbados	1954–55
8th wicket	332	England	Jonathan Trott (184)	Stuart Broad (169)	Pakistan	Lord's, London, England	2010
9th wicket	195	South Africa	Mark Boucher (78)	Pat Symcox (108)	Pakistan	New Wanderers Stadium, Johannesburg, South Africa	1997-98
10th wicket	198	England	Joe Root (154*)	James Anderson (81)	India	Trent Bridge, Nottingham, England	2014
Last updated: 27 June 2026

== See also ==
=== By country ===
- List of Afghanistan Test cricket records
- List of Australia Test cricket records
- List of Bangladesh Test cricket records
- List of England Test cricket records
- List of India Test cricket records
- List of Ireland Test cricket records
- List of New Zealand Test cricket records
- List of Pakistan Test cricket records
- List of South Africa Test cricket records
- List of Sri Lanka Test cricket records
- List of West Indies Test cricket records
- List of Zimbabwe Test cricket records

=== Others ===
- List of Cricket records
- List of One Day International cricket records
- List of Twenty20 International records
