= South African cricket team in Sri Lanka in 2006 =

South Africa in Sri Lanka in 2006
	South Africa	Sri Lanka
- Dates: 22 July – 29 August 2006
Captains	Ashwell Prince	Mahela Jayawardene

Test series
- Result: Sri Lanka won the 2-match series 2–0
Most runs	AB de Villiers (217)	Mahela Jayawardene (510)
Most wickets	Dale Steyn (8)	Muttiah Muralitharan (22)
- Player of the series: Muttiah Muralitharan (SL)

The South Africa national cricket team toured Sri Lanka for cricket matches in the 2006 cricket season. South Africa played two Test matches against Sri Lanka, one warm-up first class game over three days against Sri Lanka A, and at least four One Day Internationals as part of a triangular series. Sri Lanka took the Test series 2–0 after winning the final Test by one wicket, their second successive home Test series win against South Africa after their win in 2004.

== Squads ==
South Africa
Ashwell Prince c	LHB, SLA	Cape Cobras
Mark Boucher wk	RHB	Warriors
Hashim Amla	RHB, RM	Dolphins
Nicky Boje	LHB, SLA	Eagles
AB de Villiers wk	RHB, RM	Titans
Boeta Dippenaar	RHB, OB	Eagles
Herschelle Gibbs	RHB, RM	Cape Cobras
Andrew Hall	RHB, RFM	Lions
André Nel	RHB, RFM	Titans
Makhaya Ntini	RHB, RF	Warriors
Shaun Pollock	RHB, RFM	Dolphins
Jacques Rudolph	LHB, LBG	Titans
Dale Steyn	RHB, RF	Titans
Thandi Tshabalala	RHB, OB	Eagles
Graeme Smith withdrew on 11 July due to an injured ankle. Prince was named replacement captain. Pollock missed the first match after remaining at home for the birth of his second daughter.

Sri Lanka
Mahela Jayawardene c	RHB, RM	Sinhalese SC
Kumar Sangakkara wk	LHB	Nondescripts CC
Prasanna Jayawardene wk	RHB	Sebastianites C&AC
Malinga Bandara	RHB, LB	Ragama CC
Tillakaratne Dilshan	RHB, OB	Bloomfield C&AC
Rangana Herath	LHB, SLA	Moors SC
Sanath Jayasuriya	LHB, SLA	Bloomfield C&AC
Chamara Kapugedera	RHB, RM	Colombo CC
Farveez Maharoof	RHB, RFM	Bloomfield C&AC
Lasith Malinga	RHB, RFM	Galle CC
Muttiah Muralitharan	RHB, OB	Tamil Union C&AC
Upul Tharanga	LHB	Nondescripts CC
Chaminda Vaas	LHB, LFM	Colts CC
Michael Vandort	LHB, RM	Colombo CC

== Tour series ==
=== Sri Lanka A v South Africans ===
22–24 July 2006
Scorecard

South Africans	v	Sri Lanka A
465/4d (115 overs); Jacques Rudolph 157 (212); Nuwan Zoysa 1/54 (14 overs)		162 (46.3 overs); Upul Chandana 51* (98); Andre Nel 4/39 (13 overs)
245/8d (63.4 overs); AB de Villiers 75 (106); Upul Chandana 3/80 (22 overs)		89/1 (20 overs); Michael Vandort 29* (69); Nicky Boje 1/27 (5 overs)

Match drawn
Colts Cricket Club, Colombo
Umpires: Sagara Gallage and CBC Rodrigo (both SL)

- Sri Lanka A elected to field first.

== Test series ==
=== 1st Test ===
27–31 July 2006
Scorecard

South Africa	v	Sri Lanka
169 (50.2 overs); AB de Villiers 65 (72); Muttiah Muralitharan 4/41 (18.2 overs)		756/5d (185.1 overs); Mahela Jayawardene 374 (572); Dale Steyn 3/129 (26 overs)
434 (157.2 overs); Jacques Rudolph 90 (182); Muttiah Muralitharan 6/131 (64 overs)

Sri Lanka won by an innings and 153 runs
Singhalese Sports Club, Colombo
Umpires: Mark Benson (Eng) and Billy Bowden (NZ)
Player of the match: Mahela Jayawardene (SL)

- South Africa won the toss and elected to bat.
- Asoka de Silva (SL) stood for Benson during day five.
- Mahela Jayawardene and Kumar Sangakkara (both SL), shared a world record partnership worth 624 for the third wicket, and for any wicket.

=== 2nd Test ===
4–8 August 2006
Scorecard

South Africa	v	Sri Lanka
361 (89.5 overs); AB de Villiers 95 (141); Muttiah Muralitharan 5/128 (33.5 overs)		321 (85.1 overs); Chaminda Vaas 64 (130); Dale Steyn 5/82 (13.1 overs)
311 (107.5 overs); Herschelle Gibbs 92 (190); Muttiah Muralitharan 7/97 (46.5 overs)		352/9 (113.3 overs); Mahela Jayawardene 123 (248); Nicky Boje 4/111 (39.3 overs)

Sri Lanka won by 1 wicket
P. Sara Oval, Colombo
Umpires: Aleem Dar (Pak) and Billy Bowden (NZ)
Player of the match: Mahela Jayawardene (SL)

- South Africa won the toss and elected to bat.

Sri Lanka took the final Test by one wicket, in a match "neither side deserved to lose". South Africa opted to bat first, lost openers Gibbs and Hall for ducks, but captain Ashwell Prince shared a fifth-wicket stand of 141 with de Villiers, and Shaun Pollock also made an unbeaten half-century with the tail before Makhaya Ntini was caught on the final ball of the first day to close on 361.

Ntini then took four top-order wickets in the morning session, his final wicket being that of Sanath Jayasuriya three short of a half-century, and Sri Lanka were 86 for five, needing 275 for the final five wickets to restore parity. However, the sixth wicket stand between Chamara Kapugedera and Prasanna Jayawardene yielded 105 runs before both were bowled in successive over, and Farveez Maharoof and Chaminda Vaas then batted out 37 overs to add 117. Steyn then rounded off the tail, claiming his first Test five-for in 13.1 overs, and Sri Lanka were bowled out 40 short.

On the third day, Gibbs made a four-hour 92, as Muralitharan and Kapugedera stood for most of the wickets; Kapugedera had Jacques Rudolph and Hashim Amla run out, while Muralitharan got credited with seven wickets while bowling. The final wicket was that of Andrew Hall, the first of the innings, who was caught behind off Farveez Maharoof with the score on 76. Mark Boucher hit 65 with the tail before he was last out, setting Sri Lanka 352 to win in five sessions.

South Africa got an immediate breakthrough, with opener Upul Tharanga caught off Ntini for 0 in the third over. However, that was to be Ntini's only wicket; in his eighth over, he limped off with a hamstring injury, never to return. South Africa were left with four main bowlers, and as Steyn could not find his first innings effectiveness, and Mahela Jayawardene stood up with a six-hour 123, Sri Lanka managed the chase. At lunch on day five, they needed 19 with four wickets in hand, but Jayawardene was caught by Gibbs in the eighth over after lunch, with 11 still needed. Andrew Hall then claimed the wickets of Vaas and Muralitharan in the same over, but also conceded two runs. Maharoof hit Boje for a single, and Lasith Malinga could hit the winning run on the only ball he faced in the innings.

== Withdrawal from Unitech Cup ==
Originally, South Africa was set to play Sri Lanka and India in the tri-nation Unitech Cup one-day cricket tournament. Following a series of bomb blasts in the Sri Lankan capital, relating to the renewal of terrorist activity plaguing that country, Cricket South Africa employed an independent security consultant to determine the risk posed to players. The risk to the team was determined to be "unacceptable" and South Africa's involvement in the tour came to a premature end. Following South Africa's withdrawal, Sri Lanka and India were scheduled to play a One-day International series, but this was rained off.
