= Indian cricket team in New Zealand in 1989–90 =

International cricket tour

	India	New Zealand
- Dates: 22 January – 27 February 1990
Captains	Mohammad Azharuddin	John Wright

Test series
- Result: New Zealand won the 3-match series 1–0
Most runs	Mohammad Azharuddin (303)	John Wright (375)
Most wickets	Atul Wassan (7)	Danny Morrison (16)

The India national cricket team toured New Zealand from 22 January to 27 February 1990 and played a three-match Test series against New Zealand. New Zealand won the series 1–0.

== Test Matches ==
=== 1st Test ===
2–5 February 1990
Scorecard

New Zealand	v	India
459 (155.3 overs); John Wright 185 (443); Venkatapathy Raju 3/86 (35 overs)		164 (45.5 overs); Navjot Sidhu 51 (104); Danny Morrison 5/75 (16 overs)
2/0 (0.5 overs); Martin Snedden 1* (2); Manoj Prabhakar 0/2 (0.5 overs)		296 (91.5 overs) (f/o); Woorkeri Raman 96 (218); Richard Hadlee 4/69 (22.5 overs)

New Zealand won by 10 wickets
Lancaster Park, Christchurch
Umpires: Steve Dunne (NZ) and Steve Woodward (NZ)
Player of the match: John Wright (NZ)

- New Zealand won the toss and elected to bat.
- Venkatapathy Raju and Atul Wassan (both Ind) made their Test debuts.
- Richard Hadlee (NZ) claimed his 400th Test wicket.

=== 2nd Test ===
9–13 February 1990
Scorecard

India	v	New Zealand
358/9d (146 overs); Manoj Prabhakar 95 (268); Danny Morrison 5/98 (38 overs)		178/1 (71 overs); John Wright 113* (208); Atul Wassan 1/48 (15 overs)

Match drawn
McLean Park, Napier
Umpires: Brian Aldridge (NZ) and Steve Woodward (NZ)
Player of the match: John Wright (NZ)

- India won the toss and elected to bat.

=== 3rd Test ===
22–26 February 1990
Scorecard

New Zealand	v	India
391 (92.2 overs); Ian Smith 173 (136); Atul Wassan 4/108 (16.4 overs)		482 (104.3 overs); Mohammad Azharuddin 192 (259); Danny Morrison 5/145 (30 overs)
483/5d (159 overs); Andrew Jones 170 (446); Narendra Hirwani 3/143 (46 overs)		149/0 (45 overs); Woorkeri Raman 72* (142); Mark Greatbatch 0/0 (1 over)

Match drawn
Eden Park, Auckland
Umpires: Brian Aldridge (NZ) and Steve Dunne (NZ)
Player of the match: Ian Smith (NZ)

- India won the toss and elected to field.
- Shane Thomson (NZ) and Gursharan Singh (Ind) made their Test debuts.
- Ian Smith scored the highest score by a batsman batting at number nine in Tests (173) and at the time also became the joint holder of the record for most runs scored off a six-ball Test over, striking 24 runs off Atul Wassan.
