= Pakistani cricket team in New Zealand in 1978–79 =

International cricket tour

The Pakistan national cricket team toured New Zealand in January and February 1979 and played a three-match Test series against the New Zealand national cricket team. Pakistan won the series 1–0. New Zealand were captained by Mark Burgess and Pakistan by Mushtaq Mohammad.

== Test series summary ==
=== First Test ===
2 – 7 February 1979
(5–day match)
Scorecard

Pakistan	v	New Zealand
271 (92.6 overs); Javed Miandad 81; RJ Hadlee 5/62 (25 overs)		290 (88.4 overs); BA Edgar 129; Mushtaq Mohammad 4/60 (25 overs)
323/6d (93 overs); Javed Miandad 160*; RJ Hadlee 3/83 (26 overs)		176 (56 overs); JV Coney 36; Mushtaq Mohammad 5/59 (22 overs)

Pakistan won by 128 runs
Lancaster Park, Christchurch
Umpires: JBR Hastie and RL Monteith

- New Zealand won the toss and elected to field.
- 5 February was taken as a rest day.
- Anwar Khan (PAK) made his Test debut.

=== Second Test ===
16 – 21 February 1979
(5–day match)
Scorecard

Pakistan	v	New Zealand
360 (104.5 overs); Asif Iqbal 104; RJ Hadlee 4/101 (25 overs)		402 (101.3 overs); GP Howarth 114; Imran Khan 5/106 (33 overs)
234/3d (86 overs); Majid Khan 119*; SL Boock 2/77 (30 overs)

Match drawn
McLean Park, Napier
Umpires: FR Goodall and SJ Woodward

- Pakistan won the toss and elected to bat.
- The match was scheduled for five days but extended to six, by playing on the scheduled rest day.
- There was no play on the third day.

=== Third Test ===
23 – 28 February 1979
(5–day match)
Scorecard

New Zealand	v	Pakistan
254 (55.7 overs); JV Coney 82; Sarfraz Nawaz 3/56 (15 overs)		359 (103 overs); Zaheer Abbas 135; RJ Hadlee 5/104 (27 overs)
281/8d (91.2 overs); MG Burgess 71; Sarfraz Nawaz 4/61 (28.2 overs)		8/0 (0.6 overs); Talat Ali 8*

Match drawn
Eden Park, Auckland
Umpires: FR Goodall and JBR Hastie

- Pakistan won the toss and elected to field.
- 26 February was taken as a rest day.
- JF Reid (NZ) made his Test debut.
- Wasim Bari (Pak) became the first wicket-keeper to take seven dismissals in a Test innings.
