= Richard Hadlee =

New Zealand cricketer (born 1951)

Sir Richard Hadlee MBE
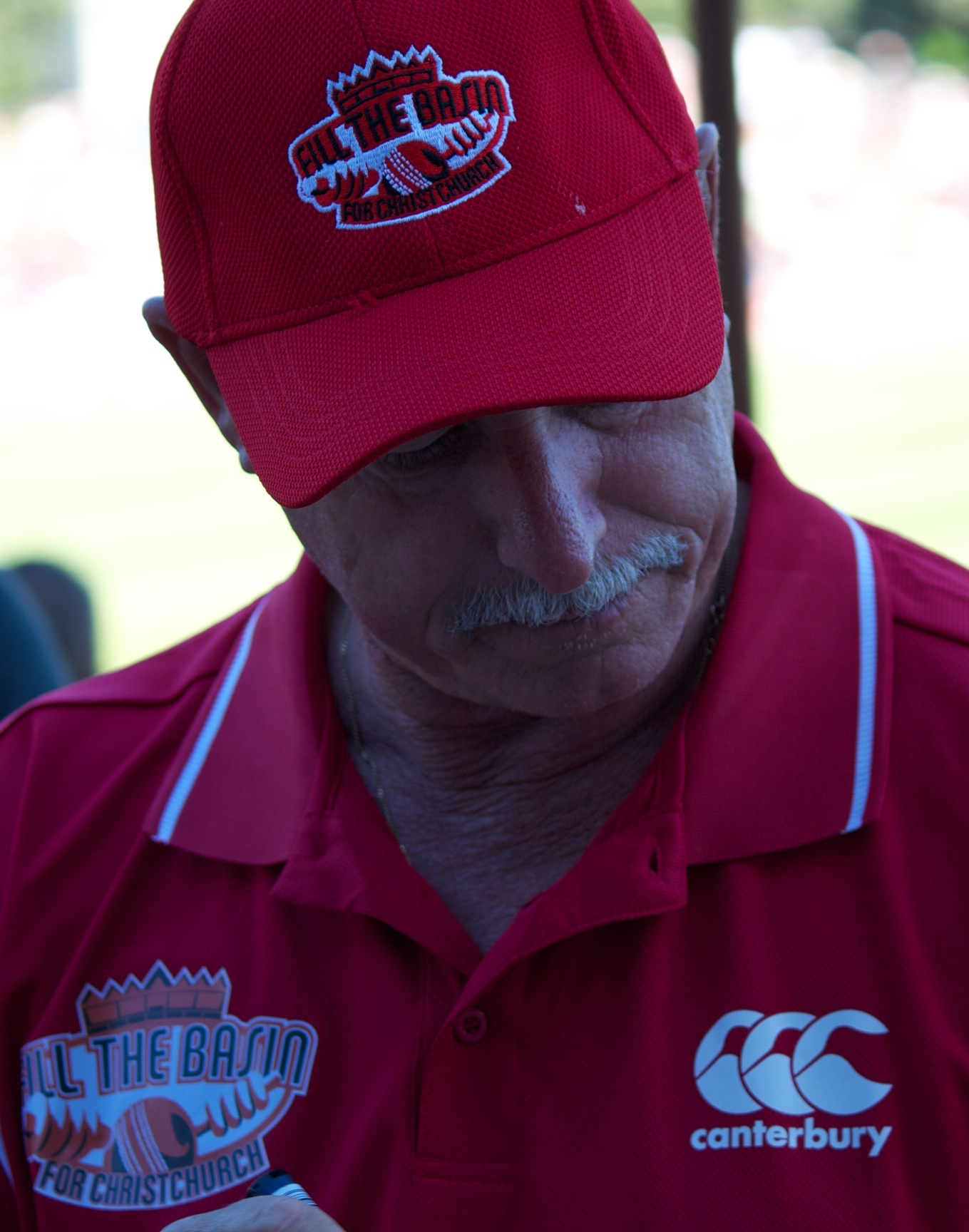
- Hadlee in March 2011

Personal information
- Full name: Richard John Hadlee
- Born: 3 July 1951 (age 75); St Albans, Christchurch, New Zealand
- Nickname: Paddles, Sir Paddles
- Height: 6 ft 1 in (1.85 m)
- Batting: Left-handed
- Bowling: Right-arm fast
- Role: Bowling All-rounder
- Relatives: Walter Hadlee (father); Barry Hadlee (brother); Dayle Hadlee (brother)

International information
- National side: New Zealand (1973–1990)
- Test debut (cap 123): 2 February 1973 v Pakistan
- Last Test: 5 July 1990 v England
- ODI debut (cap 6): 11 February 1973 v Pakistan
- Last ODI: 25 May 1990 v England

Domestic team information
- Years: Team
- 1971/72–1988/89: Canterbury
- 1978–1987: Nottinghamshire
- 1979/80: Tasmania

Career statistics
Competition	Test	ODI	FC	LA
Matches	86	115	342	318
Runs scored	3,124	1,751	12,052	5,241
Batting average	27.16	21.61	31.71	24.37
100s/50s	2/15	0/4	14/59	1/16
Top score	151*	79	210*	100*
Balls bowled	21,918	6,182	67,518	16,188
Wickets	431	158	1,490	454
Bowling average	22.29	21.56	18.11	18.83
5 wickets in innings	36	5	102	8
10 wickets in match	9	0	18	0
Best bowling	9/52	5/25	9/52	6/12
Catches/stumpings	39/–	27/–	198/–	100/–
- Source: CricInfo, 1 September 2007

Sir Richard John Hadlee (born 3 July 1951) is a New Zealand former cricketer. Hadlee is widely regarded as one of the greatest all-rounders in cricket history, and amongst the very finest fast bowlers.

Hadlee was appointed an MBE in the 1980 Queen's Birthday Honours List and later knighted in the 1990 Queen's Birthday Honours List for services to cricket. He is a former chairman of the New Zealand board of selectors. In December 2002, he was chosen by Wisden as the second greatest Test bowler of all time. In March 2009, Hadlee was commemorated as one of the Twelve Local Heroes, and a bronze bust of him was unveiled outside the Christchurch Arts Centre.

On 3 April 2009, Hadlee was inducted into the ICC Cricket Hall of Fame. He is the most prominent member of the Hadlee cricket playing family.

== Personal life ==
Hadlee was born on 3 July 1951 at St Albans, Christchurch. His father Walter Hadlee, and two of his four brothers, Dayle and Barry, played cricket for New Zealand. His former wife Karen also played international cricket for New Zealand.

Having discovered that he had Wolff–Parkinson–White syndrome six months after retiring, he had heart surgery in July 1991. Hadlee had the syndrome since birth and felt some of the effects like irregular heartbeat during his career. Hadlee continues to lead an active life and works with the Heart Foundation.

In June 2018, Hadlee was diagnosed with bowel cancer and underwent tumour removal surgery.

== Test career ==
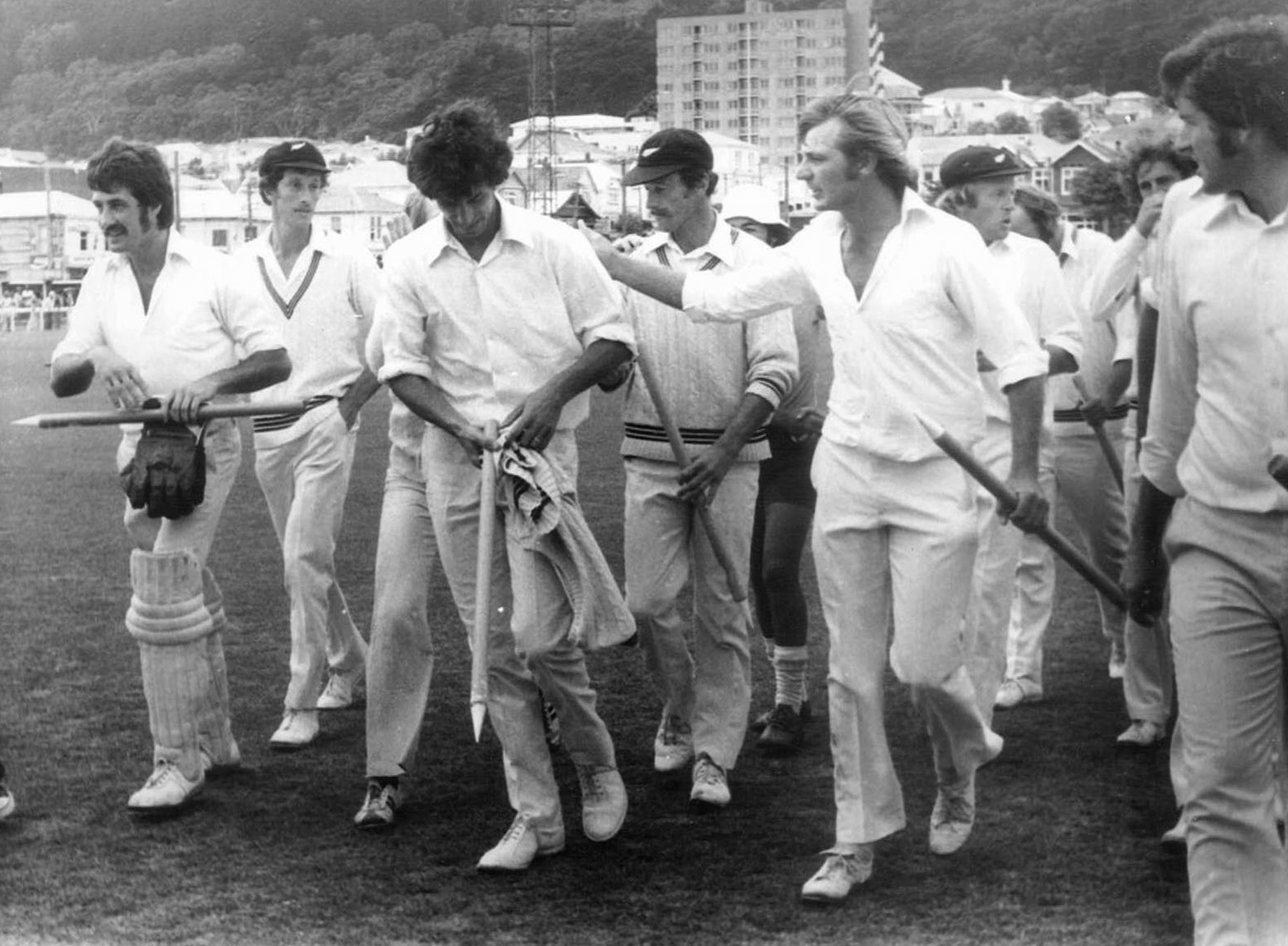
Hadlee and the New Zealand Team after first win Against England, 1978

An all-rounder who was primarily a bowler, in an 86-Test career he took 431 wickets (at the time the world record), and was the first bowler to pass 400 wickets, with an average of 22.29, and made 3124 Test runs at 27.16, including two centuries and 15 fifties.

Hadlee is rated by many experts as the greatest exponent of bowling with the new ball. He was the master of (conventional) swing and was the original Sultan of Swing. Hadlee was seen as one of the finest fast bowlers of his time, despite the contemporaneous presence of high-quality players such as Dennis Lillee, Imran Khan, Andy Roberts, Michael Holding, Joel Garner, Kapil Dev, Ian Botham, Wasim Akram and Malcolm Marshall among others.

As one of the four top all-rounders of his time, (the others being Imran Khan, Kapil Dev and Ian Botham) Hadlee had the best bowling average of the four, but the lowest batting average.

Born in Christchurch, Hadlee made his first class debut for Canterbury in 1971/72 and his Test match debut in 1973 – on both occasions, his first delivery was dispatched to the boundary. Hadlee was an inconsistent performer at Test level for several years, but a breakthrough performance against India in 1976, in which he took 11 wickets in a game resulting in a win by New Zealand, cemented his place in the side. In 1978, Hadlee helped New Zealand to a historic first win over England by taking 6 for 26 in England's second innings, bowling the visitors out for 64 chasing a target of 137.

In 1979/80, New Zealand faced the West Indies in a home Test series at a time when the West Indies were a formidable world cricket power. In the first Test in Dunedin New Zealand achieved a shock 1-wicket win, helped by Hadlee's 11 wickets in the game. In the second Test, Hadlee scored his maiden Test century, helping New Zealand draw the Test and win the series 1–0. The result was the start of a 12-year unbeaten home record for New Zealand in Test match series. Hadlee was appointed a Member of the Order of the British Empire, for services to cricket, in the 1980 Queen's Birthday Honours.

A tour to England in 1983 saw New Zealand register their first ever Test win on English soil, at Headingley. The match was remarkable for Hadlee's match return of 0 for 89, a very unusual occurrence in a New Zealand victory during his career. England eventually won the 4 Test series 3–1. Hadlee topped both batting and bowling averages for New Zealand in the series, and took his 200th Test wicket in the final Test at Nottingham. In the return Test series in New Zealand in 1984, New Zealand completed a remarkable three-day innings victory (including one day lost to rain) over England at Christchurch, in which England were dismissed for less than 100 in both of their innings. The match was also notable for Hadlee's superb all-round performance – he took 8 wickets in the match, and scored a rapid-fire 99 in New Zealand's only innings. These efforts led him to achieve the number 1 ranking in ICC Test Bowling Rankings for the year 1984 (he retained it for the next four years, till 1988).

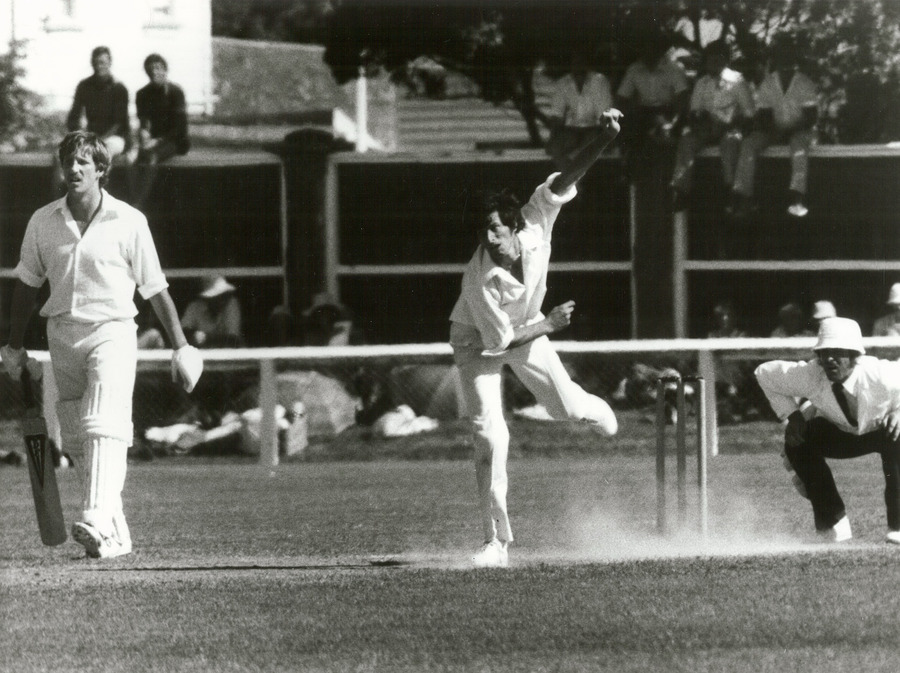
Ian Botham and Richard Hadlee, Basin Reserve, February 1978

1985/86 was the beginning of a period in which Hadlee developed from a very good fast bowler to a truly great one. In New Zealand's tour to Australia, an outstanding all-round performance helped destroy the home team in the first Test at Brisbane, beginning with a personal Test best 9 for 52 in Australia's first innings. A batting effort of 54 (to complement a fine 188 by Martin Crowe) combined with 6 more wickets in Australia's second innings, helped New Zealand to a crushing innings victory. Hadlee followed this up with 7 wickets in a loss in the second Test, and 11 wickets in a New Zealand victory in the third Test, giving his country their first series win on Australian soil and a personal haul of 33 wickets in 3 Tests. In the first Test of the return series in New Zealand, Hadlee took his 300th Test wicket by trapping Australian captain Allan Border LBW. The series was eventually won 2-1 by New Zealand by way of a victory in the third Test at Eden Park.

In 1986 Hadlee helped New Zealand to a 1–0 series win in England, their first over that country in England. Hadlee's outstanding personal performance in the second Test at Nottingham (his county 'home') where he took 10 wickets and scored 68 in New Zealand's first innings powered his team to victory. In this Test Hadlee, often a controversial character, added to this side of his reputation when he felled (and hospitalised) England wicketkeeper and Nottinghampshire teammate Bruce French with a nasty bouncer. During the New Zealand v West Indies Test at Christchurch in March 1987, Hadlee and captain Jeremy Coney had a disagreement in the dressing room prior to the game. It progressed to not talking to each other on the field, communicating through John Wright at mid-on.

In April 1987, New Zealand travelled to Sri Lanka where Hadlee recorded his second Test century. His 151 not out in the first Test helped New Zealand to save the game; however, the tour was cut short due to a bomb exploding near the New Zealand team's hotel in Colombo. The terrorist bomb responsible for killing 113 civilians was planted by the Tamil Tigers separatist movement and was not thought to be directed at the touring New Zealand cricket team. Nonetheless, the team voted overwhelmingly to return home after that one Test of the scheduled three-Test tour.

Hadlee's appetite for competition against Australia surfaced again in 1987/88, when in the third Test of a 3 match series in Australia he captured 10 wickets and nearly inspired New Zealand to an unlikely series-equalling victory. The Test ended with Australia's number eleven batsman Michael Whitney surviving a torrid last over bowled by an exhausted Hadlee. A wicket in that over would have given New Zealand victory, and Hadlee a world record 374th Test wicket, breaking current holder Ian Botham's record. In the following home series against England, the New Zealand public eagerly anticipated the wicket which would give Hadlee sole possession of the world record. However, Hadlee broke down injured on the first day of the first Test, and was forced to sit out the rest of the series. At an awards dinner at the end of the season, Australian commentator Richie Benaud, upon seeing Hadlee hobble up to the stage on crutches, said later that he thought Hadlee "would never play cricket again."

However, after a successful rehabilitation, the next opportunity for Hadlee to claim the Test wicket world record was against India in India in 1988. After touring India in 1976 Hadlee, plagued by stomach troubles, had decided never to play cricket there again, however the opportunity to make history was too strong a lure to pass up. He duly captured the record, and his 374th Test wicket, in the first Test of the series. In the second Test a 10 wicket haul helped New Zealand to a rare Test win in India, although the series was eventually lost 2–1.

In a home series against India in 1989/90, Hadlee become the first bowler in history to take 400 Test wickets when he dismissed Sanjay Manjrekar in the second innings of the first Test on his home ground in Christchurch, while a group of Old Boys from his former school sang their school song. Shortly after helping New Zealand to another Test victory over Australia at Wellington by taking his 100th first class 5 wicket haul in an innings, Hadlee announced that he would be retiring after the upcoming tour to England.

Shortly before the second Test of the England series at Lord's, the 1990 Queen's Birthday Honours were announced and included Hadlee's appointment as a Knight Bachelor, for services to cricket. Hadlee was not invested with his knighthood until 4 October 1990 after the end of his final Test match on 10 July 1990, although he became Sir Richard upon the publication date of the Honours List. Lt.-Col. Sir Maharajkumar Dr. Vijayananda Gajapathi Raju (better known as the Maharajkumar of Vizianagram or Vizzy) was the only other person to be knighted for services to cricket while an active Test cricketer, in 1936. Unlike Hadlee however, Vizzy's knighthood was recognised for his administrative efforts in cricket rather than his achievements as a player. (Alastair Cook was subsequently knighted in 2019 while still a full-time first-class player, but shortly after his final Test match.) Due to most knighted cricketers being batsmen, Hadlee liked to joke that he was the first bowler to receive a knighthood since Sir Francis Drake. Hadlee celebrated the achievement by scoring 86 in New Zealand's first innings and winning the man of the match award. In the final Test of the series, Hadlee ended his Test career by taking 5 wickets in his final bowling performance, and taking a wicket with the final ball of his Test career.

When his father Walter was asked to vote, for the 2000 edition of Wisden, for his choice of the five cricketers of the 20th century, he included Richard, confessing it was "embarrassing nominating my own son... But there's a job to be done. I will cite the bare facts." He had considered Dennis Lillee for his selection, but found Richard's Test match performance put him marginally ahead. In total, Richard Hadlee received thirteen votes from the 100 electors, coming the equal tenth as player of the century.

== Nottinghamshire career ==
For Nottinghamshire, on often overgrassed Trent Bridge pitches, he gained some analyses that are remarkable in an era of covered pitches, notably his eight for 22 against Surrey in 1984. He represented Nottinghamshire between 1978 and 1987, but played only three full seasons due to injuries and Test calls. However, his bowling figures for those three seasons were quite remarkable:

- 1981: 4252 balls, 231 maidens, 1564 runs, 105 wickets for 14.89 each.
- 1984: 4634 balls, 248 maidens, 1645 runs, 117 wickets for 14.05 each.
- 1987: 3408 balls, 186 maidens, 1154 runs, 97 wickets for 11.89 each (the lowest average since 1969).

In those three seasons he was voted the PCA Player of the Year by his peers of the Professional Cricketers' Association (PCA). He won The Cricket Society Wetherall Award for the Leading All-Rounder in English First-Class Cricket in 1982, 1984, 1986 and 1987.

In the 1984 county season, Hadlee completed a feat rare in the modern age by doing the county 'double' – scoring 1000 runs and taking 100 wickets in the same season. Hadlee, and his immediate successor at Nottinghamshire Franklyn Stephenson, are the only two players to achieve this feat in English county cricket since the number of county games per season was reduced in 1969. The runs component of the double included Hadlee's highest first class score, 210* in a victory over Middlesex at Lord's. In 1987, his swan song, he narrowly missed the double as Nottinghamshire won the County Championship as they had in 1981. Hadlee's contribution with ball and bat to both and their other triumphs was immense. They next won the championship in 2005 with fellow Kiwi Stephen Fleming in charge.

== Canterbury career ==
Because of seasonal differences, Hadlee also played provincial cricket in New Zealand, representing Canterbury.

The now-demolished north stand of the earthquake-damaged AMI Stadium was named the Hadlee stand after both Richard Hadlee and other members of the Hadlee family who have made contributions to Canterbury and New Zealand cricket. The Chappell–Hadlee Trophy in which New Zealand and Australia regularly compete in one-day matches is named after the Chappell family of Australia and the Hadlee family of New Zealand.

Hadlee was also a competent association football player, playing for southern league team Rangers A.F.C. in Christchurch.

== Bowling style ==
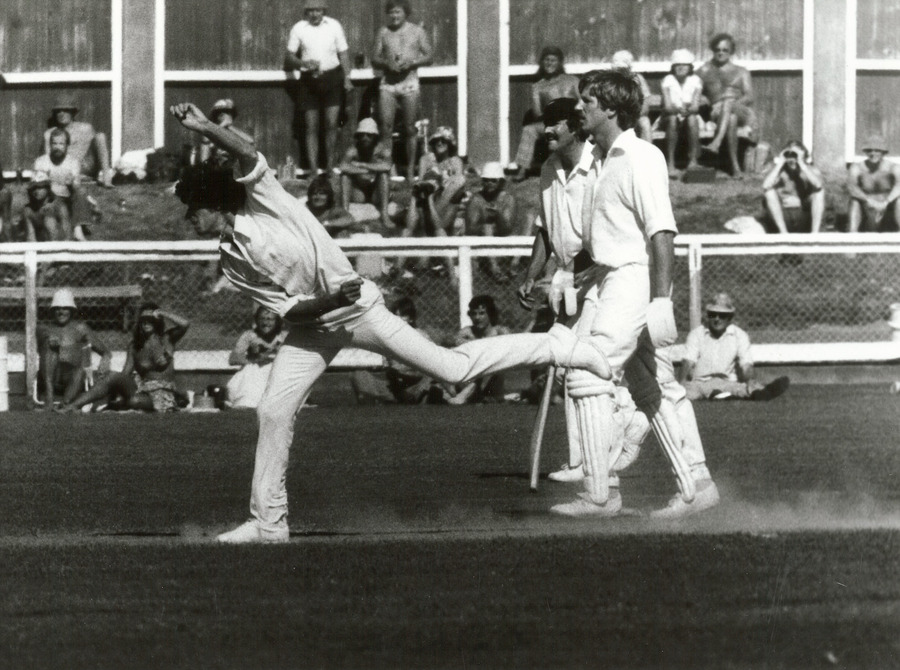
Richard Hadlee bowling and Ian Botham at non-strikers end. Basin Reserve, February 1978

Hadlee was a right-arm pace bowler. Initially extremely fast as a young man, as the years progressed he shortened his run-up, gaining improved accuracy and considerable movement off the wicket and in the air. Perhaps his most potent delivery was the outswinger, which became his main weapon in the latter stages of his career.

The most influential person as Hadlee developed and through his career was Dennis Lillee, who he saw as the exemplar of the fast bowler. "He was big, strong, fit, confident, aggressive, had marvelous skills, great technique, he intimidated the batsmen with sheer presence and of course he got you out!" In tough situations in a game Hadlee would ask himself what Lillee would do in equivalent circumstances, and would strive to copy his determination. In his book Menace, Lillee believed that determination was the greatest contribution to his success. Of Hadlee he considers him super skillful, the first true professional he saw in tests with serial away swingers on off stump with the occasional inswinger or cutter, the odd bouncer and a very rare yorker.

His economical action was notable for his close approach to the wicket at the bowler's end (to the point where he occasionally knocked the bails off in his approach), a line which meant he was able to trap many batsmen leg before wicket. He broke the Test-wicket taking record with his 374th wicket on 12 November 1988 in Bangalore, India. His 400th Test wicket was claimed on 4 February 1990, and with his final Test delivery, on 9 July 1990, he dismissed Devon Malcolm for a duck.

== Batting style ==
Hadlee was an aggressive left-handed middle-order batsman. Though his record was not as strong against top international bowlers, he was effective at punishing lesser attacks. He finished his career scoring 15 Test fifties and two Test centuries, while for Nottinghamshire in 1984, 1986 and 1987 he averaged over 50 (only W.G. Grace and George Herbert Hirst have come comparably close to heading both batting and bowling averages in a season).

== The Sir Richard Hadlee Sports Trust ==
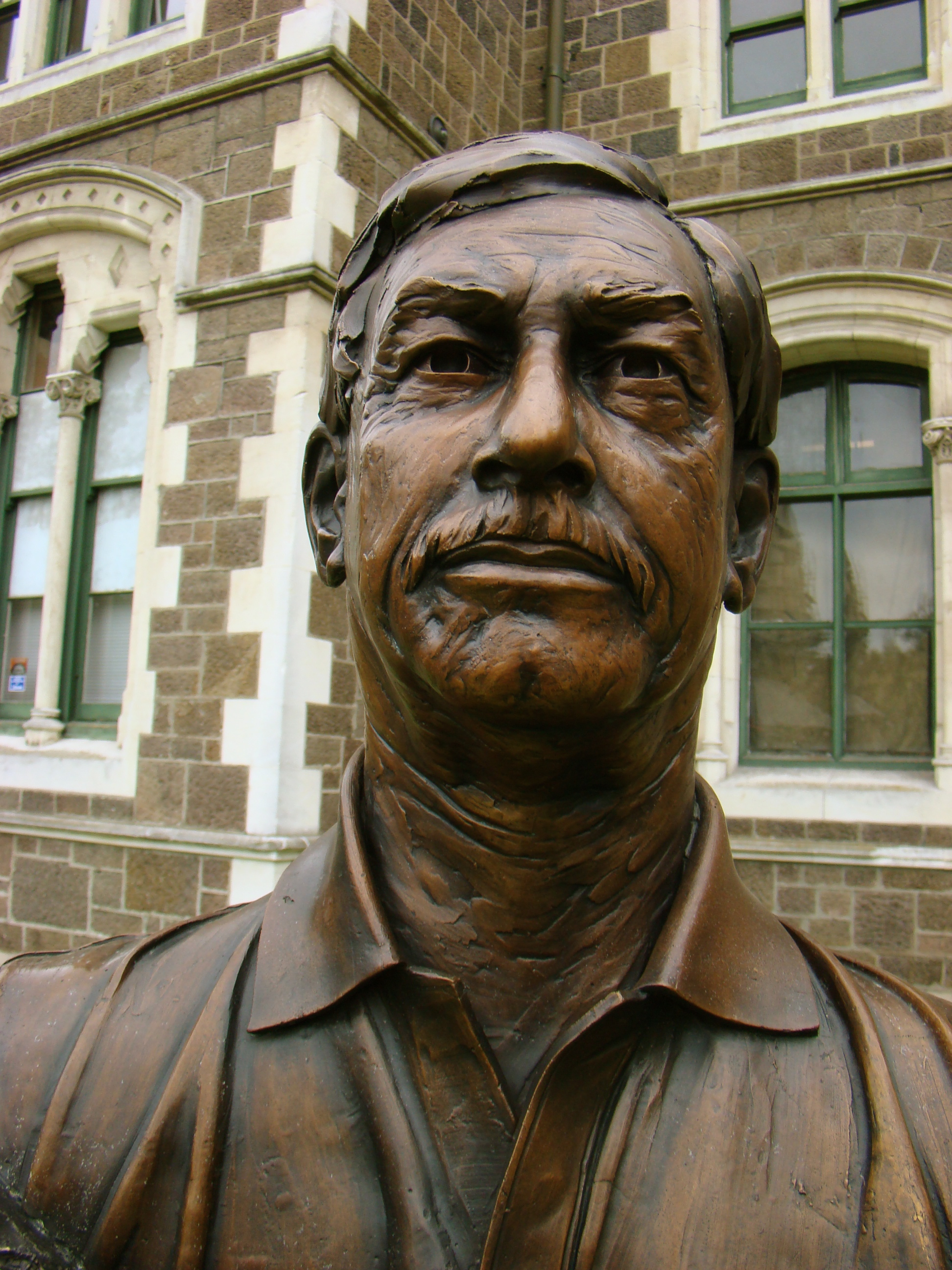
A bust of Hadlee at the Twelve Local Heroes display, Christchurch.

In August 1990, Hadlee established The Sir Richard Hadlee Sports Trust. It was opened to help sportsmen and women who were in situations of hardship to strive for success in their chosen sporting or cultural discipline. The criteria for the Sir Richard Hadlee Sports Trust are: the applicant must be under the age of 25, the applicant must be from the region of Canterbury New Zealand, the request for assistance is specifically for sporting or cultural purposes and applicant is disadvantaged, facing hardship or has special circumstances which prevent him or her from pursuing his or her sporting or cultural endeavors. The Sir Richard Hadlee Sports Trust relies on the generosity of the community, as well as its corporate sponsors CTV, Lion Nathan, Newstalk ZB, Pernod Ricard, Pope Print, PR South and Vbase.

== International record and awards ==
- Hadlee became the first player to complete the double of scoring 1,000 runs and taking 100 wickets in ODI history
- He was the second fastest bowler to take five-wicket hauls in 25 Test matches, the fastest seamer to achieve this feat (62 matches) and the third fastest in terms of number of innings played
- He took a total of 36 five-wicket hauls in Test matches and five in ODIs, the former a record in Test cricket at the time of his retirement
- Hadlee produced the best single innings bowling figures by any fast bowler in the 20th century (9/52 in the 1st innings of the 1st Test match against Australia at The Gabba in 1985)

=== Sporting awards ===
Hadlee has received many awards throughout his career, including:

- Appointed MBE for services to New Zealand sport in 1980
- Awarded a Knighthood for services to cricket in 1990
- Winner of the Windsor Cup on 13 occasions, including 12 consecutive years, for the most meritorious bowling performance of the season
- New Zealand Sportsman of the Year 1980
- Wisden Cricketer of the Year – 1982
- New Zealand Sportsman of the Year 1986
- New Zealand Sportsperson of the last 25 years 1987 (shared with runner John Walker)
- New Zealand Sportsperson of the Decade 1987
- Bert Sutcliffe Medal in 2008
- Inducted into the ICC Cricket Hall of Fame in 2009
- Inducted into the NZC Hall of Fame in 2024 as one of the First XI

Awards and achievements
Preceded by Ian Botham	World record – most career wickets in test cricket 431 wickets (22.29) in 86 Tests; Held record 12 November 1988 to 8 February 1994	Succeeded by Kapil Dev
Preceded by Ivan Mauger	Halberg Awards – Supreme Award; 1980; 1986	Succeeded by Allison Roe
Preceded by Susan Devoy	Halberg Awards – Supreme Award; 1980; 1986	Succeeded by All Blacks
New award	New Zealand's sportsman of the year 1987; 1989	Succeeded by Mark Todd
Preceded by Mark Todd	New Zealand's sportsman of the year 1987; 1989	Succeeded by Peter Blake
