= List of Australia Test cricket records =

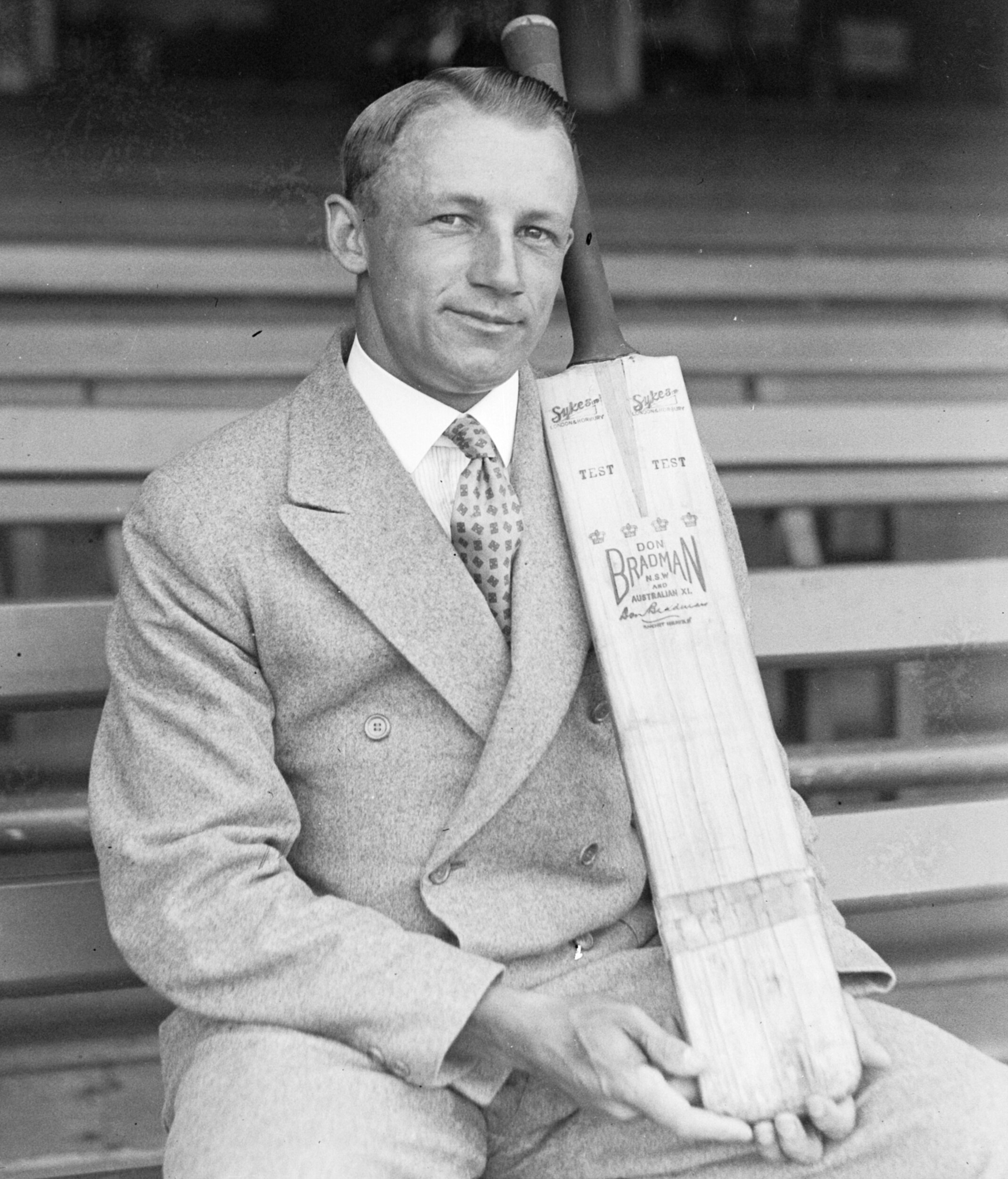
Don Bradman (pictured), widely acknowledged as the greatest batsman of all time, still holds several records.

Test cricket is the oldest form of cricket played at international level. A Test match is scheduled to take place over a period of five days, (Note: For the first 50 years of Test cricket matches were played over three or four days and until the 1930s some timeless Tests were played.) (Note: In October 2017, the ICC Board approved a trial of four-day Test cricket to run through until the 2019 Cricket World Cup.) and is played by teams representing full member nations of the International Cricket Council (ICC). Australia was a founding member of the ICC having played the first Test match against England in March 1877 at the Melbourne Cricket Ground. They have played a total of 887 matches, second only to England who have played over 1,100. As of November 2026, Australia is the most successful team in Test cricket with an overall winning percentage of 48.36, ahead of their nearest rival South Africa on 40.04.

Top order batsman and former captain Don Bradman holds several batting records. Considered to be the greatest batsman of all time, he played 52 Tests between 1928 and 1948. He holds the record for the highest Test average of 99.94, has scored the most Test double centuries with 12, the equal most Test triple centuries with 2 and the most runs scored in a series with 974 during the 1930 Ashes series. He also holds the highest fifth-wicket partnership with Sid Barnes with 405 runs, set during the 1946–47 Ashes series, the oldest of the wicket partnerships records. A further two Australian partnership records for the second and the sixth wickets set by Bradman still stand.

Shane Warne, regarded as one of the best bowlers in the history of the game, holds several Test records. He held the record for the most Test wickets with 708 until December 2007 when Sri Lankan bowler Muttiah Muralitharan passed Warne's milestone. Warne is second only to Muralitharan in taking the most five-wicket hauls in an innings and the most ten-wicket hauls in a Test match. Glenn McGrath, who took 563 wickets in his career, is third to England's James Anderson and Stuart Broad for the most wickets taken by a fast bowler in Test cricket. Adam Gilchrist is Australia's most successful wicket-keeper having taken 416 dismissals. He is second only to South Africa's Mark Boucher with 555 to his name. Allan Border, who made his Test debut in 1978 and captained Australia from 1984 until his retirement in 1994, holds the Australian record for the most consecutive matches played with 153 and the record for the most matches played as skipper for Australia with 93.

== Key ==
The top five records are listed for each category, except for the team wins, losses, draws and ties and the partnership records. Tied records for fifth place are also included. Explanations of the general symbols and cricketing terms used in the list are given below. Specific details are provided in each category where appropriate. All records include matches played for Australia only, and are correct as of November 2026.

Key
Symbol	Meaning
†	Player or umpire is currently active in Test cricket
*	Player remained not out or partnership remained unbroken
♠	Test cricket record
d	Innings was declared (e.g. 8/758d)
Date	Starting date of the Test match
Innings	Number of innings played
Matches	Number of matches played
Opposition	The team Australia was playing against
Period	The time period when the player was active in Test cricket
Player	The player involved in the record
Venue	Test cricket ground where the match was played

== Team records ==
=== Team wins, losses, draws and ties ===
As of November 2026, Australia has played 887 Test matches resulting in 428 victories, 238 defeats, 219 draws and 2 ties for an overall winning percentage of 48.36, the highest winning percentage of Test playing teams. Australia has played the second-highest number of Test matches, behind England who have competed in 1,100. Australia has played matches against 10 of the 12 other Test playing teams. (Note: The 12 full members of the ICC and the ICC World XI team for a total of 13.) They have yet to play against the two recent teams to be granted Test status in Ireland and Afghanistan. (Note: In May 2018, Cricket Australia ruled out a playing a Test against Ireland ahead of the 2019 Ashes series due their being only ten free days between the 2019 Cricket World Cup final and the start of the first Test in Edgbaston. Further there were plans for Ireland to tour to Australia in 2022–23 and play a Test, but ultimately Australia hosted the West Indies and South Africa.) (Note: Australia was initially due play Afghanistan in a Test match in November 2020 at Perth Stadium ahead of the four match series against India. In September 2020, the match was postposed due to the COVID-19 pandemic. It was rescheduled to be played November 2021 at Bellerive Oval in Hobart ahead of the 2021–22 Ashes series. In September 2021, Cricket Tasmania announced that the match would not be proceeding following the Taliban offensive in Afghanistan, due to the Taliban not supporting women's cricket. It was confirmed by Cricket Australia in November 2021, that the match had been postponed.) Australia has never lost or drawn a match against Zimbabwe, the only team to do so save for Ireland. Australia is also the only team to win their debut Test match with every other team losing their first Test except Zimbabwe who drew against India.

Australian Test results by opposition
Opposition	First Test	Matches	Won	Lost	Drawn	Tied	% Won
Bangladesh	18 July 2003	8	6	2	0	0	75.00
England	15 March 1877	366	156	113	97	0	42.62
ICC World XI	14 October 2005	1	1	0	0	0	100.00
India	28 November 1947	112	48	33	30	1	43.30
New Zealand	29 March 1946	62	36	8	18	0	58.06
Pakistan	11 October 1956	72	37	15	20	0	51.38
South Africa	11 October 1902	105	55	29	21	0	52.38
Sri Lanka	22 April 1983	35	22	5	8	0	62.85
West Indies	12 December 1930	123	64	33	25	1	52.43
Zimbabwe	14 October 1999	3	3	0	0	0	100.00
Total		887	428	238	219	2	48.36
Last updated: 4 November 2026

=== Team scoring records ===
==== Most runs in an innings ====
The highest innings total scored in Test cricket came in the series between Sri Lanka and India in August 1997. Playing in the first Test at R. Premadasa Stadium in Colombo, the hosts posted a first innings total of 6/952d. This broke the longstanding record of 7/903d which England set against Australia in the final Test of the 1938 Ashes series at The Oval. The fifth Test of the 1954–55 series against the West Indies saw Australia set their highest innings total of 8/758d, the ninth-highest score in Test cricket.

Highest Test innings scores by Australia
Rank	Score	Opposition	Venue	Date
1	8/758d	West Indies	Sabina Park, Kingston, Jamaica	11 June 1955
2	6/735d	Zimbabwe	WACA Ground, Perth, Australia	9 October 2003
3	6/729d	England	Lord's, London, England	27 June 1930
4	701	England	The Oval, London, England	18 August 1934
5	695	England	The Oval, London, England	16 August 1930
Last updated: 30 November 2024

==== Highest successful run chases ====
Australia's highest successful run chase in Test cricket came in the fourth Test of the 1948 Ashes series at Headingley. Australia reached the target of 404 runs with seven wickets in hand. This was a Test record at the time of posting and remained so until May 2003 when the West Indies defeated Australia at the Antigua Recreation Ground. Set 418 for victory in the final innings, the hosts achieved the target for the loss of seven wickets.

Highest successful Test run chases by Australia
Rank	Score	Target	Opposition	Venue	Date
1	3/404	404	England	Headingley, Leeds, England	22 July 1948
2	6/369	369	Pakistan	Bellerive Oval, Hobart, Australia	18 November 1999
3	7/362	359	West Indies	Bourda, Georgetown, Guyana	31 March 1978
4	8/342	339	India	WACA Ground, Perth, Australia	16 December 1977
5	5/336	336	South Africa	Kingsmead Cricket Ground, Durban, South Africa	20 January 1950
Last updated: 30 November 2024

==== Fewest runs in an innings ====
The lowest innings total scored in Test cricket came in the second Test of England's tour of New Zealand in March 1955. Trailing England by 46, New Zealand was bowled out in their second innings for 26 runs. The equal sixth-lowest score in Test history is Australia's total of 36 scored in their first innings against England in the first Test of the 1902 Ashes series.

Lowest Test innings scores by Australia
Rank	Score	Opposition	Venue	Date
1	36	England	Edgbaston Cricket Ground, Birmingham, England	29 May 1902
2	42	England	Sydney Cricket Ground, Sydney, Australia	10 February 1888
3	44	England	The Oval, London, England	10 August 1896
4	47	South Africa	Newlands Cricket Ground, Cape Town, South Africa	9 November 2011
5	53	England	Lord's, London, England	22 June 1896
Last updated: 30 November 2024

==== Most runs conceded in an innings ====
The highest innings total scored in Test cricket came in the series between Sri Lanka and India in August 1997. Playing in the first Test at R. Premadasa Stadium in Colombo, the hosts posted a first innings total of 6/952d. This broke the longstanding record of 7/903d which England set against Australia in the final Test of the 1938 Ashes series at The Oval.

Highest Test innings scores against Australia
Rank	Score	Opposition	Venue	Date
1	7/903d	England	The Oval, London, England	20 August 1938
2	7/705d	India	Sydney Cricket Ground, Sydney, Australia	2 January 2004
3	8/658d	England	Trent Bridge, Nottingham, England	10 June 1938
4	7/657d	India	Eden Gardens, Kolkata, India	11 March 2001
5	651	South Africa	Newlands Cricket Ground, Cape Town, South Africa	19 March 2009
Last updated: 28 December 2025

==== Fewest runs conceded in an innings ====
The lowest innings total scored in Test cricket came in the second Test of England's tour of New Zealand in March 1955. Trailing England by 46, New Zealand was bowled out in their second innings for 26 runs. The second-lowest score in Test history is the West Indies' total of 27 scored in their second innings against Australia in the third Test of the 2025 series at Sabina Park.

Lowest Test innings scores against Australia
Rank	Score	Opposition	Venue	Date
1	27	West Indies	Sabina Park, Kingston, Jamaica	12 July 2025
2	36	South Africa	Melbourne Cricket Ground, Melbourne, Australia	12 February 1932
2	36	India	Adelaide Oval, Adelaide, Australia	17 December 2020
4	42	New Zealand	Basin Reserve, Wellington, New Zealand	29 March 1946
5	45	South Africa	Melbourne Cricket Ground, Melbourne, Australia	12 February 1932
5	45	England	Sydney Cricket Ground, Sydney, Australia	28 January 1887
Last updated: 28 December 2025

=== Result records ===
A Test match is won when one side has scored more runs than the total runs scored by the opposing side during their two innings. If both sides have completed both their allocated innings and the side that fielded last has the higher aggregate of runs, it is known as a win by runs. This indicates the number of runs that they had scored more than the opposing side. If one side scores more runs in a single innings than the total runs scored by the other side in both their innings, it is known as a win by innings and runs. If the side batting last wins the match, it is known as a win by wickets, indicating the number of wickets that were still to fall.

==== Greatest win margins (by innings) ====
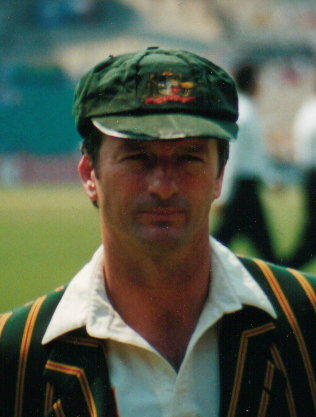
In 2002, Steve Waugh (pictured) led Australia to victory over South Africa by an innings and 360 runs, Australia's greatest winning margin by an innings.

The fifth Test of the 1938 Ashes series at The Oval saw England win by an innings and 579 runs, the largest victory by an innings in Test cricket history. The next largest victory was Australia's win against South Africa in the first Test of the 2001–02 tour at the Wanderers Stadium, where the tourists won by an innings and 360 runs.

Largest Test victories by an innings by Australia
Rank	Margin	Opposition	Venue	Date
1	Innings and 360 runs	South Africa	Wanderers Stadium, Johannesburg, South Africa	22 February 2002
2	Innings and 332 runs	England	The Gabba, Brisbane, Australia	29 November 1946
3	Innings and 259 runs	South Africa	St George's Park, Port Elizabeth, South Africa	3 March 1950
4	Innings and 242 runs	Sri Lanka	Galle International Stadium, Galle, Sri Lanka	29 January 2025
5	Innings and 226 runs	India	The Gabba, Brisbane, Australia	28 November 1947
Last updated: 15 February 2025

==== Greatest win margins (by runs) ====
The greatest winning margin by runs in Test cricket was England's victory over Australia by 675 runs in the first Test of the 1928–29 Ashes series. The next largest victory was recorded by Australia with their win over England in the final Test of the 1934 Ashes series by 562 runs.

Largest Test victories by runs by Australia
Rank	Margin	Opposition	Venue	Date
1	562 runs	England	The Oval, London, England	18 August 1934
2	530 runs	South Africa	Melbourne Cricket Ground, Melbourne, Australia	17 February 1911
3	491 runs	Pakistan	WACA Ground, Perth, Australia	16 December 2004
4	419 runs	West Indies	Adelaide Oval, Adelaide, Australia	8 December 2022
5	409 runs	England	Lord's, London, England	24 June 1948
Last updated: 30 November 2024

==== Greatest win margins (by 10 wickets) ====
Australia have won a Test match by a margin of 10 wickets on 32 occasions, more than any other Test playing team. (Note: The other teams to have won a Test match by a margin of 10 wickets are the West Indies (28), England (22), Pakistan (13), Sri Lanka (11), South Africa (10), India (9), New Zealand (5), Bangladesh (1) and Zimbabwe (1).)

Test victories by 10 wickets by Australia
Rank	Victories	Opposition	Most recent venue	Date
1	8	England	The Gabba, Brisbane, Australia	23 November 2017
2	6	South Africa	Sydney Cricket Ground, Sydney, Australia	2 January 2002
2	6	West Indies	Adelaide Oval, Adelaide, Australia	17 January 2024
4	4	India	Adelaide Oval, Adelaide, Australia	6 December 2024
5	3	New Zealand	Basin Reserve, Wellington, New Zealand	19 March 2010
5	3	Pakistan	The Gabba, Brisbane, Australia	5 November 1999
7	2	Sri Lanka	Galle International Stadium, Galle, Sri Lanka	29 June 2022
8	1	Zimbabwe	Harare Sports Club, Harare, Zimbabwe	14 October 1999
Last updated: 30 November 2024

==== Narrowest win margins (by runs) ====
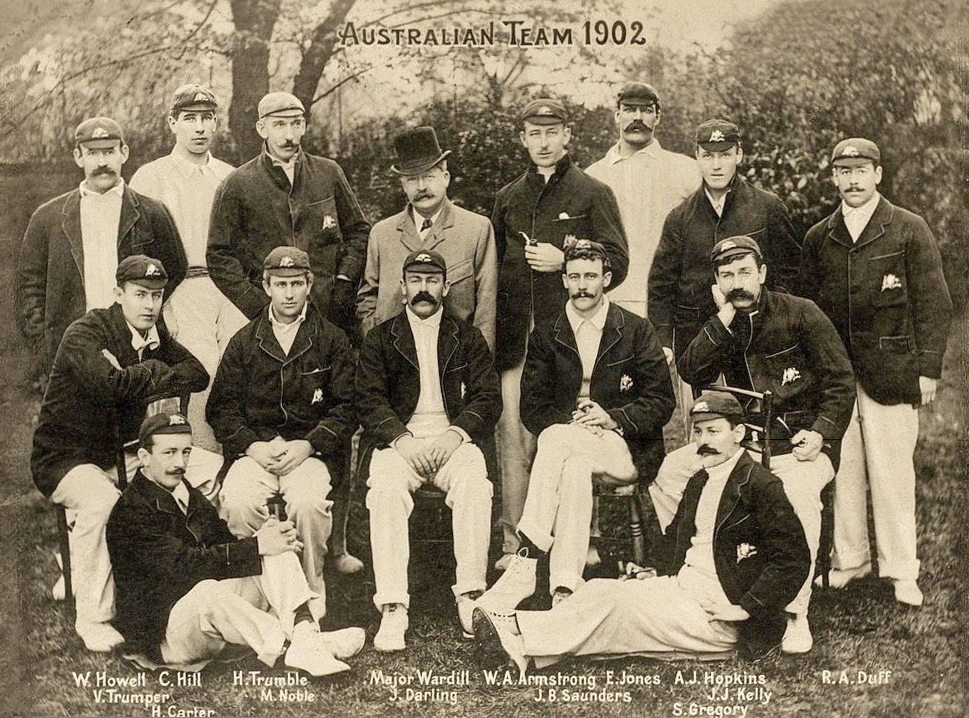
The Australian cricket team captained by Joe Darling (seated middle), won the fourth Test of the 1902 Ashes series by a margin of three runs and lost the fifth Test by a margin of one wicket. Both records still stand over a century later as Australia's narrowest win by runs and narrowest loss by wickets, respectively.

Australia's narrowest win by runs was against England in the fourth Test of the 1902 Ashes series at Old Trafford. Set 124 runs for victory in the final innings, England were bowled all out for 120 to give victory to Australia by three runs. This was the equal fourth-narrowest win in Test cricket, with the narrowest being the West Indies' one-run win over Australia in 1993 and the one-run victory by New Zealand against England in 2023.

Smallest Test victories by runs by Australia
Rank	Margin	Opposition	Venue	Date
1	3 runs	England	Old Trafford, Manchester, England	24 July 1902
2	6 runs	England	Sydney Cricket Ground, Sydney, Australia	20 February 1885
3	7 runs	England	The Oval, London, England	28 August 1882
4	11 runs	England	Adelaide Oval, Adelaide, Australia	16 January 1925
5	16 runs	India	The Gabba, Brisbane, Australia	2 December 1977
5	16 runs	Sri Lanka	Sinhalese Sports Club Cricket Ground, Colombo, Sri Lanka	17 August 1992
Last updated: 30 November 2024

==== Narrowest win margins (by wickets) ====
Australia's narrowest win by wickets came in the fourth Test of the West Indies tour of Australia in 1951–52. Played at the Melbourne Cricket Ground, the hosts won the match by a margin of one wicket, one of only fifteen one-wicket victories in Test cricket.

Smallest Test victories by wickets by Australia
Rank	Margin	Opposition	Venue	Date
1	1 wicket	West Indies	Melbourne Cricket Ground, Melbourne, Australia	31 December 1951
2	2 wickets	England	Sydney Cricket Ground, Sydney, Australia	13 December 1907
2	2 wickets	West Indies	Melbourne Cricket Ground, Melbourne, Australia	10 February 1961
2	2 wickets	India	WACA Ground, Perth, Australia	16 December 1977
2	2 wickets	South Africa	St George's Park Cricket Ground, Port Elizabeth, South Africa	14 March 1997
2	2 wickets	South Africa	Wanderers Stadium, Johannesburg, South Africa	31 March 2006
2	2 wickets	South Africa	Wanderers Stadium, Johannesburg, South Africa	17 November 2011
2	2 wickets	England	Edgbaston Cricket Ground, Birmingham, England	16 June 2023
Last updated: 30 November 2024

==== Greatest loss margins (by innings) ====
The Oval in London played host the greatest defeat by an innings in Test cricket. The final Test of the 1938 Ashes saw England defeat the tourists by an innings and 579 runs, to the draw the series at one match all.

Largest Test defeats by an innings by Australia
Rank	Margin	Opposition	Venue	Date
1	Innings and 579 runs ♠	England	The Oval, London, England	20 August 1938
2	Innings and 230 runs	England	Adelaide Oval, Adelaide, Australia	24 March 1892
3	Innings and 225 runs	England	Melbourne Cricket Ground, Melbourne, Australia	9 February 1912
4	Innings and 219 runs	India	Eden Gardens, Kolkata, India	18 March 1998
5	Innings and 217 runs	England	The Oval, London, England	12 August 1886
Last updated: 30 November 2024

==== Greatest loss margins (by runs) ====
The first Test of the 1928–29 Ashes series saw Australia defeated by England by 675 runs, the greatest losing margin by runs in Test cricket. The match was played at the Brisbane Exhibition Ground, the first of only two Test matches contested at the venue.

Largest Test defeats by runs by Australia
Rank	Margin	Opposition	Venue	Date
1	675 runs ♠	England	Brisbane Exhibition Ground, Brisbane, Australia	30 November 1928
2	492 runs	South Africa	Wanderers Stadium, Johannesburg, South Africa	30 March 2018
3	408 runs	West Indies	Adelaide Oval, Adelaide, Australia	26 January 1980
4	373 runs	Pakistan	Sheikh Zayed Cricket Stadium, Abu Dhabi, United Arab Emirates	16 October 2018
5	356 runs	Pakistan	Sheikh Zayed Cricket Stadium, Abu Dhabi, United Arab Emirates	30 October 2014
Last updated: 30 November 2024

==== Greatest loss margins (by 10 wickets) ====
Australia have lost a Test match by a margin of 10 wickets on 10 occasions. (Note: The other teams to have lost a Test match by a margin of 10 wickets are Ireland (1), Afghanistan (2), Bangladesh (6), Sri Lanka (7), Zimbabwe (8), Pakistan (11), South Africa (12), New Zealand (13), the West Indies (18), India (19) and England (25).)

Test defeats by 10 wickets by Australia
Rank	Defeats	Opposition	Most recent venue	Date
1	6	West Indies	Sabina Park, Kingston, Jamaica	13 March 1999
2	3	England	Sydney Cricket Ground, Sydney, Australia	2 December 1932
3	1	South Africa	Adelaide Oval, Adelaide, Australia	24 January 1964
Last updated: 30 November 2024

==== Narrowest loss margins (by runs) ====
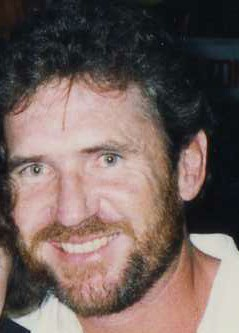
Allan Border (pictured) was the captain of the Australian team that lost the fourth Test against the West Indies in 1993 by a margin of one run, the narrowest loss in Test cricket history.

Only two matches in 149 years of Test cricket have been decided by a margin of one run. The first was the fourth Test of the West Indian tour of Australia in 1992–93 playing for the Frank Worrell Trophy. Contested at Adelaide Oval, Australia was set 186 runs for victory in the final innings. With just two runs left to score, Australia's number eleven batsman Craig McDermott was caught behind off the bowling of Courtney Walsh, to give the victory to the tourists.

Smallest Test defeats by runs by Australia
Rank	Margin	Opposition	Venue	Date
1	1 run ♠	West Indies	Adelaide Oval, Adelaide, Australia	23 January 1993
2	2 runs	England	Edgbaston Cricket Ground, Birmingham, England	4 August 2005
3	3 runs	England	Melbourne Cricket Ground, Melbourne, Australia	26 December 1982
4	5 runs	South Africa	Sydney Cricket Ground, Sydney, Australia	2 January 1994
5	7 runs	New Zealand	Bellerive Oval, Hobart, Australia	9 December 2011
Last updated: 30 November 2024

==== Narrowest loss margins (by wickets) ====
Test cricket has seen fifteen matches decided by a margin of one wicket, with Australia being defeated in six of them. The first of these was the final Test of the 1902 Ashes series at The Oval where England ran down the target of 263 runs in the final innings. The most recent occurring during the 2019 Ashes series against England. The third Test at Headingley saw the hosts achieving their highest successful run chase in Test cricket of 359 runs.

Rank	Margin	Opposition	Venue	Date
1	1 wicket	England	The Oval, London, England	11 August 1902
1	1 wicket	England	Melbourne Cricket Ground, Melbourne, Australia	1 January 1908
1	1 wicket	Pakistan	National Stadium, Karachi, Pakistan	28 September 1994
1	1 wicket	West Indies	Kensington Oval, Bridgetown, Barbados	26 March 1999
1	1 wicket	India	Punjab Cricket Association Stadium, Mohali, India	1 October 2010
1	1 wicket	England	Headingley, Leeds, England	22 August 2019
Last updated: 30 November 2024

==== Tied matches ====
A tie can occur when the scores of both teams are equal at the conclusion of play, provided that the side batting last has completed their innings. Only two matches have ended in a tie in Test cricket history, both of which involved Australia.

Tied Test matches
Opposition	Venue	Date
West Indies ♠	The Gabba, Brisbane, Australia	9 December 1960
India ♠	M. A. Chidambaram Stadium, Chennai, India	18 September 1986
Last updated: 30 November 2024

== Batting records ==
=== Most career runs ===
A run is the basic means of scoring in cricket. A run is scored when the batsman hits the ball with his bat and with his partner runs the length of 22 yards (20 m) of the pitch.

India's Sachin Tendulkar has scored the most runs in Test cricket with 15,921. Second is Joe Root of England with 14,278, as of November 2026, ahead of Ricky Ponting of Australia in third with 13,378. Allan Border, Steve Waugh and Steve Smith are the only other Australian batsmen who have scored more than 10,000 runs in Test cricket.

Most career Test runs by Australian batsmen
Rank	Runs	Player	Matches	Innings	Period
1	13,378	Ricky Ponting	168	287	1995–2012
2	11,174	Allan Border	156	265	1978–1994
3	11,003	Steve Smith †	127	227	2010–2026
4	10,927	Steve Waugh	168	260	1985–2004
5	8,786	David Warner	112	205	2011–2024
Last updated: 4 November 2026

=== Highest individual score ===
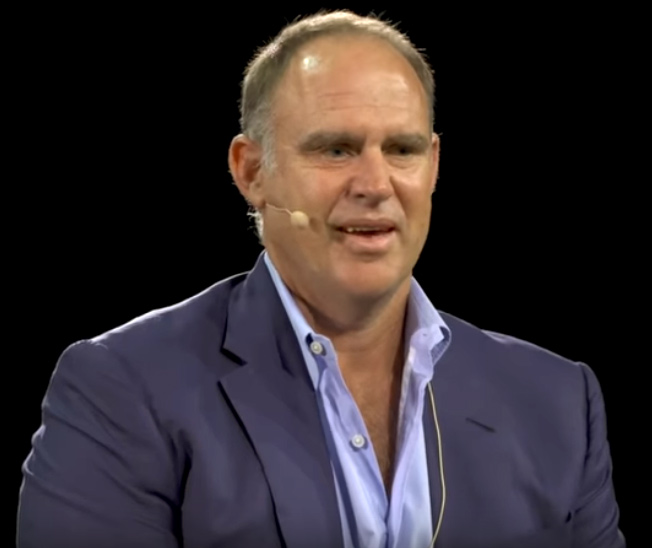
Matthew Hayden (pictured) has scored the highest individual Test score (380) for Australia.

The first Test of the 2003–04 series of the Southern Cross Trophy, contested between Australia and Zimbabwe, at the WACA Ground saw Matthew Hayden of Australia set the highest individual Test innings score with 380, surpassing Brian Lara's 375 scored against England in April 1994 at the Antigua Recreation Ground. Six months after Hayden set the record, the West Indian claimed it back scoring 400 not out against the same opposition and on the same ground.

Highest individual Test score by Australian batsmen
Rank	Runs	Player	Opposition	Venue	Date
1	380	Matthew Hayden	Zimbabwe	WACA Ground, Perth, Australia	9 October 2003
2	335*	David Warner	Pakistan	Adelaide Oval, Adelaide, Australia	29 November 2019
3	334*	Mark Taylor	Pakistan	Peshawar Club Ground, Peshawar, Pakistan	15 October 1998
4	334	Don Bradman	England	Headingley, Leeds, England	11 July 1930
5	329*	Michael Clarke	India	Sydney Cricket Ground, Sydney, Australia	3 January 2012
Last updated: 30 November 2024

=== Highest career average ===
A batsman's batting average is the total number of runs they have scored divided by the number of times they have been dismissed.

Australia's Don Bradman, widely acknowledged as the greatest batsman of all time, finished his Test career with an average of 99.94. Adam Voges who retired in 2016, has the second-best career average in Test cricket with 61.87.

Highest career average by Australian batsmen
Rank	Average	Player	Runs	Innings	Not out	Period
1	99.94 ♠	Don Bradman	6,996	80	10	1928–1948
2	61.87	Adam Voges	1,485	31	7	2015–2016
3	55.29	Steve Smith †	11,003	227	28	2010–2026
4	53.86	Greg Chappell	7,110	151	19	1970–1984
5	51.85	Ricky Ponting	13,378	287	29	1995–2012
Qualification: 20 innings. Last updated: 4 November 2026

=== Most half-centuries ===
A half-century is a score of between 50 and 99 runs. Statistically, once a batsman's score reaches 100, it is no longer considered a half-century but a century.

The currently active Joe Root of England has scored the most half-centuries in Test cricket with 69, as of November 2026. He is followed by Sachin Tendulkar of India on 68, the West Indies' Shivnarine Chanderpaul on 66, India's Rahul Dravid and Allan Border of Australia on 63 and in sixth with 62 fifties to his name, Australia's Ricky Ponting.

Most Test half-centuries by Australian batsmen
Rank	Half centuries	Player	Innings	Runs	Period
1	63	Allan Border	265	11,174	1978–1994
2	62	Ricky Ponting	287	13,378	1995–2012
3	50	Steve Waugh	260	10,927	1985–2004
4	47	Mark Waugh	209	8,029	1991–2002
5	45	Steve Smith †	227	11,003	2010–2026
Last updated: 4 November 2026

=== Most centuries ===
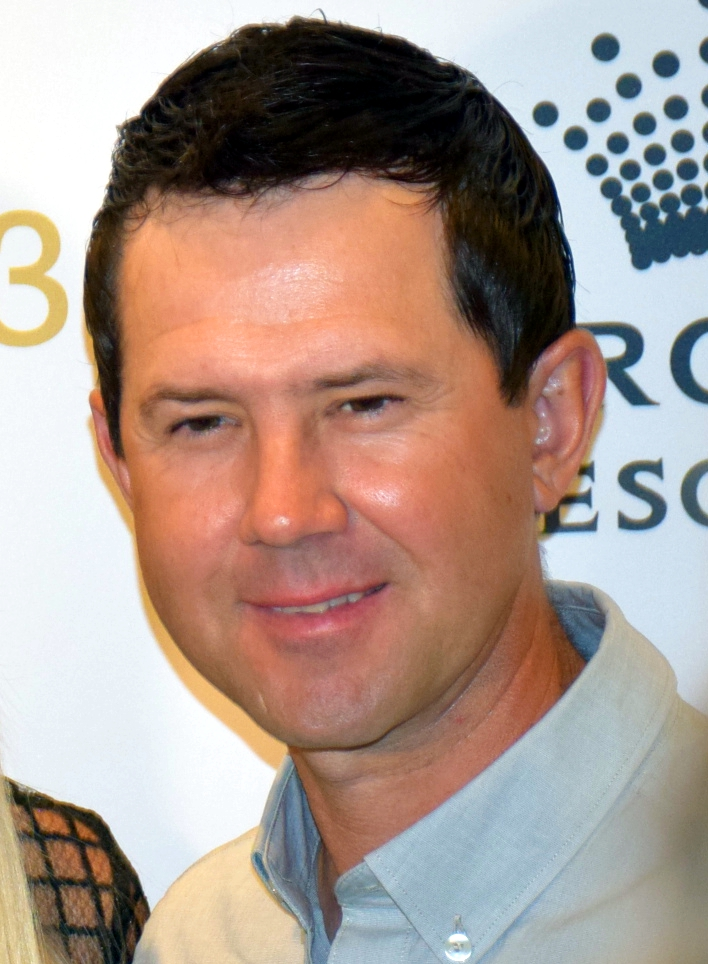
Ricky Ponting (pictured) has scored the most Test runs (13,378), the most centuries (41) and the most fours (1,509) for Australia.

A century is a score of 100 or more runs in a single innings.

Tendulkar has scored the most centuries in Test cricket with 51. South Africa's Jacques Kallis is next on 45 and both Ricky Ponting and the currently active Joe Root with 41 hundreds are in third, as of November 2026.

Most Test centuries by Australian batsmen
Rank	Centuries	Player	Innings	Runs	Period
1	41	Ricky Ponting	287	13,378	1995–2012
2	37	Steve Smith †	227	11,003	2010–2026
3	32	Steve Waugh	260	10,927	1985–2004
4	30	Matthew Hayden	184	8,625	1994–2009
5	29	Don Bradman	80	6,996	1928–1948
Last updated: 4 November 2026

=== Most double centuries ===
A double century is a score of 200 or more runs in a single innings.

Bradman holds the Test record for the most double centuries scored with twelve, one ahead of Sri Lanka's Kumar Sangakkara who finished his career with eleven. In third is Brian Lara of the West Indies with nine. England's Wally Hammond, India's Virat Kohli and Mahela Jayawardene of Sri Lanka have all scored seven and Ponting is one of eight cricketers who reached the mark on six occasions.

Most Test double centuries by Australian batsmen
Rank	Double centuries	Player	Innings	Runs	Period
1	12 ♠	Don Bradman	80	6,996	1928–1948
2	6	Ricky Ponting	287	13,378	1995–2012
3	4	Greg Chappell	151	7,110	1970–1984
3	4	Michael Clarke	198	8,643	2004–2015
3	4	Steve Smith †	227	11,003	2010–2026
Last updated: 4 November 2026

=== Most triple centuries ===
A triple century is a score of 300 or more runs in a single innings.

Bradman holds the equal Test record for the most triple centuries scored with two, along with India's Virender Sehwag and West Indians Chris Gayle and Brian Lara. Six Australians have scored a single Test triple century with former vice-captain David Warner the most recent to do so in 2019, as of November 2026.

Most Test triple centuries by Australian batsmen
Rank	Triple centuries	Player	Innings	Runs	Period
1	2 ♠	Don Bradman	80	6,996	1928–1948
2	1	Bob Cowper	46	2,061	1964–1968
2	1	Bob Simpson	111	4,869	1957–1978
2	1	Matthew Hayden	184	8,625	1994–2009
2	1	Mark Taylor	186	7,525	1989–1999
2	1	Michael Clarke	198	8,645	2004–2015
2	1	David Warner	205	8,786	2011–2024
Last updated: 30 November 2024

=== Most sixes ===
A score of six runs is scored if the ball has been struck by the bat and is first grounded beyond the boundary without having been in contact with the ground within the field of play.

The former English captain Ben Stokes holds the record for the most sixes scored in Test matches with 138. Stokes overtook New Zealand's Brendon McCullum's mark of 107 sixes in February 2023. Former Australian wicket-keeper Adam Gilchrist is third clearing the boundary 100 times throughout his career.

Most career Test sixes by Australian batsmen
Rank	Sixes	Player	Innings	Runs	Period
1	100	Adam Gilchrist	137	5,570	1999–2008
2	82	Matthew Hayden	184	8,625	1994–2009
3	73	Ricky Ponting	287	13,378	1995–2012
4	71	Steve Smith †	227	11,003	2010–2026
5	69	David Warner	205	8,786	2011–2024
Last updated: 4 November 2026

=== Most fours ===
A score of four runs is scored if the ball is grounded beyond the boundary with first having been in contact with the ground within the field of play.

Tendulkar has also scored most fours in Test cricket with 2,059 (Note: Cricinfo lists this number as 2,058 with a note that complete career figures are not known. This is due to the incomplete scorecard for the one off Test played between India and Sri Lanka in November 1990 at the Sector 16 Stadium in Chandigarh including whether Tendulkar scored any boundaries in his innings total of 11 runs. CricketArchive's scorecard of this match is missing this information as well. Charles Davis' Test Match Database does list Tendulkar as scoring a single boundary in India's only innings of the match.) ahead of his compatriot Rahul Dravid on 1,654 and West Indian Brian Lara on 1,559. Ponting is in fourth reaching the boundary on 1,509 occasions.

Most career Test fours by Australian batsmen
Rank	Fours	Player	Innings	Runs	Period
1	1,509	Ricky Ponting	287	13,378	1995–2012
2	1,195	Steve Smith †	227	11,003	2010–2026
3	1,175	Steve Waugh	260	10,927	1985–2004
4	1,161	Allan Border	265	11,174	1978–1994
5	1,049	Matthew Hayden	184	8,625	1994–2009
Last updated: 4 November 2026

=== Most runs in a series ===
The 1930 Ashes series in England saw Bradman set the record for the most runs scored in a single series, falling just 26 short of 1,000 runs. He is followed by Wally Hammond with 905 runs scored in the 1928–29 Ashes series. Mark Taylor with 839 in the 1989 Ashes and Neil Harvey with 834 in 1952–53 South African series are third and fourth on the list, respectively.

Most runs in a Test series by Australian batsmen
Rank	Runs	Player	Matches	Innings	Series
1	974 ♠	Don Bradman	5	7	1930 Ashes series
2	839	Mark Taylor	6	11	1989 Ashes series
3	834	Neil Harvey	5	9	South African cricket team in Australia in 1952–53
4	810	Don Bradman	5	9	1936–37 Ashes series
5	806	Don Bradman	5	5	South African cricket team in Australia in 1931–32
Last updated: 30 November 2024

=== Most ducks ===
A duck refers to a batsman being dismissed without scoring a run. Glenn McGrath has scored the fourth-highest number of ducks in Test cricket with 35 behind the West Indies' Courtney Walsh with 43, Stuart Broad of England with 39 and New Zealand's Chris Martin who failed to post a score 36 times.

Most Test ducks by Australian batsmen
Rank	Ducks	Player	Matches	Innings	Period
1	35	Glenn McGrath	124	138	1993–2007
2	34	Shane Warne	145	199	1992–2007
3	22	Steve Waugh	168	260	1985–2004
4	20	Nathan Lyon †	144	184	2011–2026
5	19	Mitchell Johnson	73	109	2007–2015
5	19	Mark Waugh	128	209	1991–2002
Last updated: 4 November 2026

== Bowling records ==
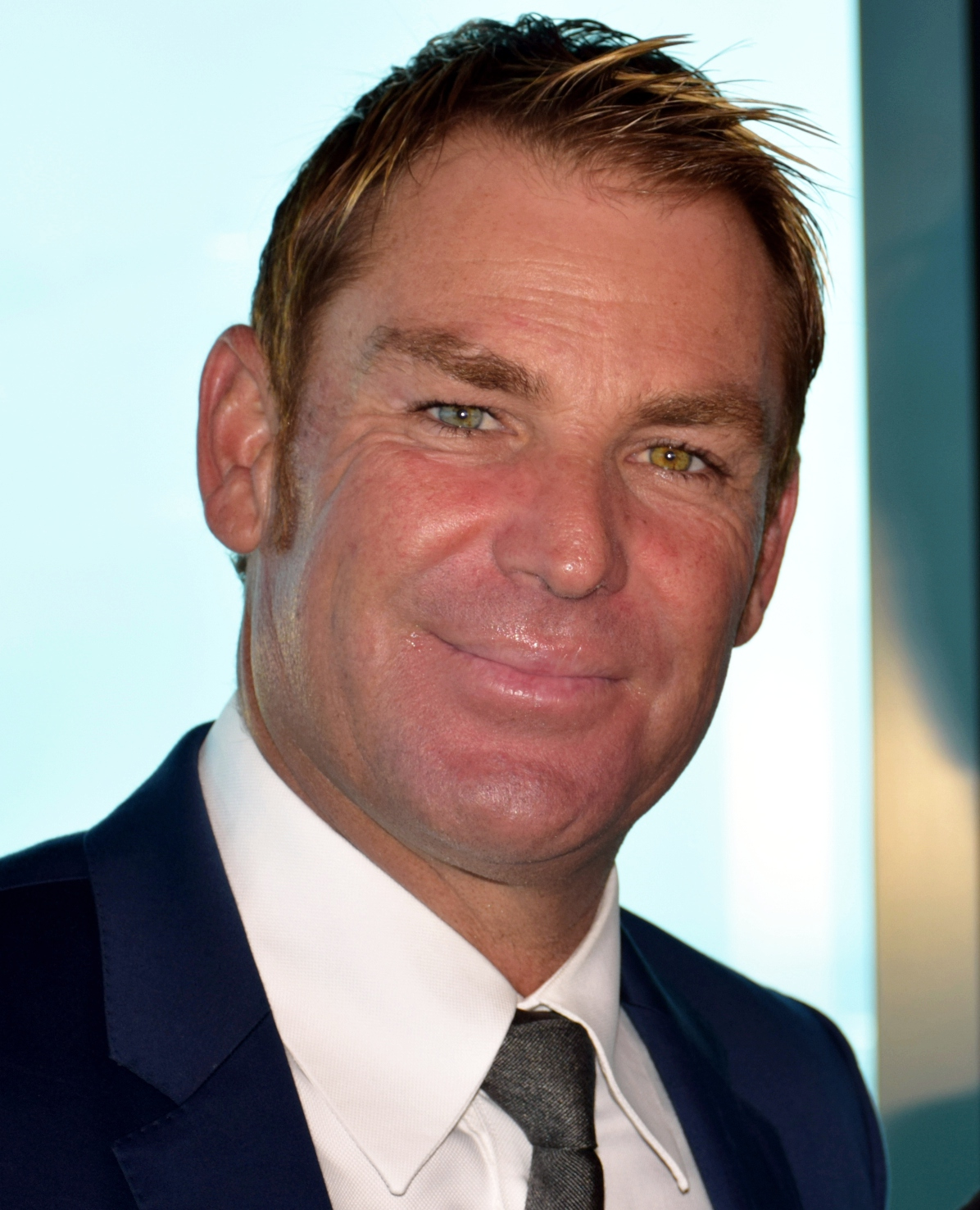
Shane Warne (pictured) has taken the most Test wickets (708), the most five-wicket hauls (37) and the most ten-wicket hauls (10) for Australia.

=== Most career wickets ===
A bowler takes the wicket of a batsman when the form of dismissal is bowled, caught, leg before wicket, stumped or hit wicket. If the batsman is dismissed by run out, obstructing the field, handling the ball, hitting the ball twice or timed out the bowler does not receive credit.

Shane Warne held the record for the most Test wickets with 708 until December 2007 when Sri Lankan bowler Muttiah Muralitharan passed Warne's milestone. Muralitharan, who continued to play until 2010, finished with 800 wickets to his name. James Anderson of England is third with 704 Test wickets to his name, overtaking Australia's Glenn McGrath in September 2018 to become the fast bowler with the most Test wickets. India's Anil Kumble is fourth on the list taking 619 wickets. Stuart Broad with 604 wickets moved into fifth in September 2022 after becoming the second fast bowler to overtake McGrath's total of 563 wickets. Nathan Lyon now sits in sixth with 577 wickets, as of November 2026, eclipsing McGrath's total during the third Test of the 2025–26 Ashes series.

Most career Test wickets by Australian bowlers
Rank	Wickets	Player	Matches	Innings	Runs	Period
1	708	Shane Warne	145	273	17,995	1992–2007
2	577	Nathan Lyon †	145	269	17,511	2011–2026
3	563	Glenn McGrath	124	243	12,186	1993–2007
4	460	Mitchell Starc †	110	211	11,948	2011–2026
5	355	Dennis Lillee	70	132	8,493	1971–1984
Last updated: 4 November 2026

=== Best figures in an innings ===
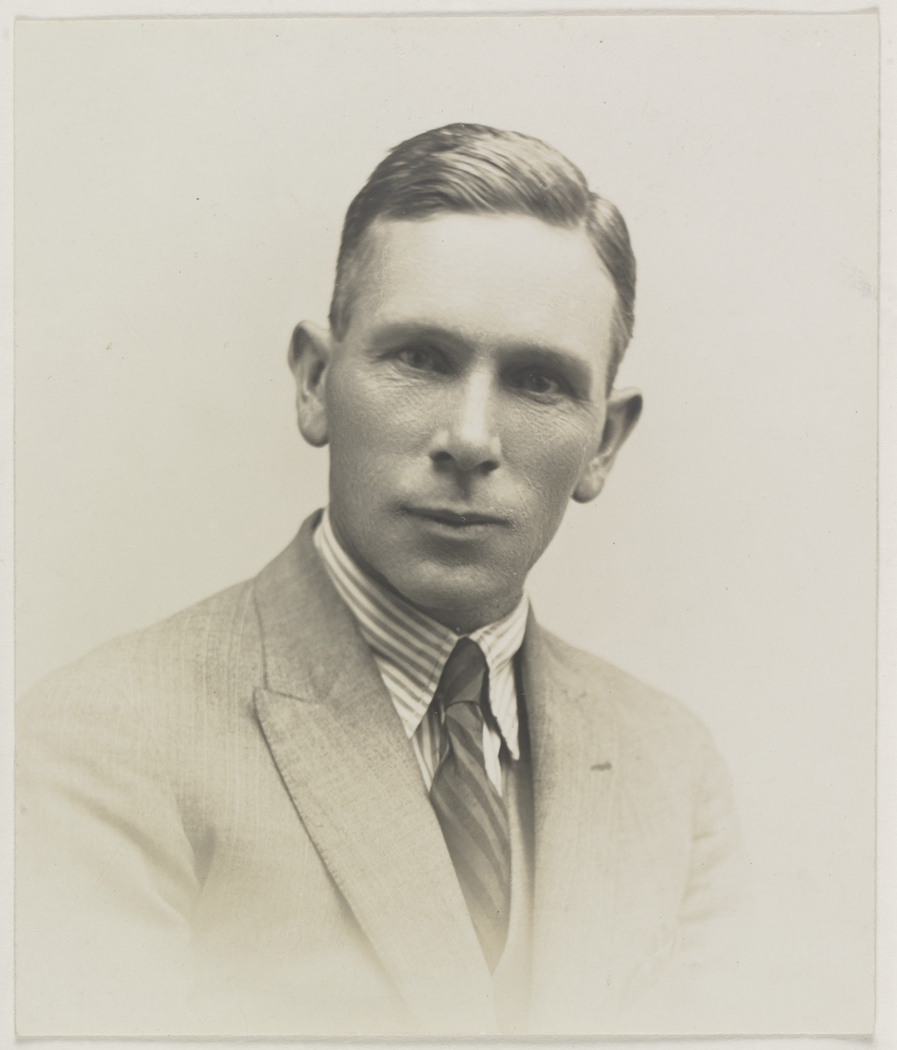
Arthur Mailey (pictured) took 9/121 in the fourth Test of the 1920–21 Ashes series, the best figures by an Australian bowler in a Test match innings.

Bowling figures refers to the number of the wickets a bowler has taken and the number of runs conceded.

There have been three occasions in Test cricket where a bowler has taken all 10 wickets in a single innings – Jim Laker of England took 10/53 against Australia in 1956, India's Anil Kumble in 1999 returned figures of 10/74 against Pakistan and in 2021 Ajaz Patel of New Zealand took 10/119 against India. Arthur Mailey is one of 16 bowlers who have taken nine wickets in a Test match innings.

Best figures in a Test innings by Australian bowlers
Rank	Figures	Player	Opposition	Venue	Date
1	9/121	Arthur Mailey	England	Melbourne Cricket Ground, Melbourne, Australia	11 February 1921
2	8/24	Glenn McGrath	Pakistan	WACA Ground, Perth, Australia	16 December 2004
3	8/31	Frank Laver	England	Old Trafford, Manchester, England	26 July 1909
4	8/38	Glenn McGrath	England	Lord's, London, England	19 June 1997
5	8/43	Albert Trott	England	Adelaide Oval, Adelaide, Australia	11 January 1895
Last updated: 30 November 2024

=== Best figures in a match ===
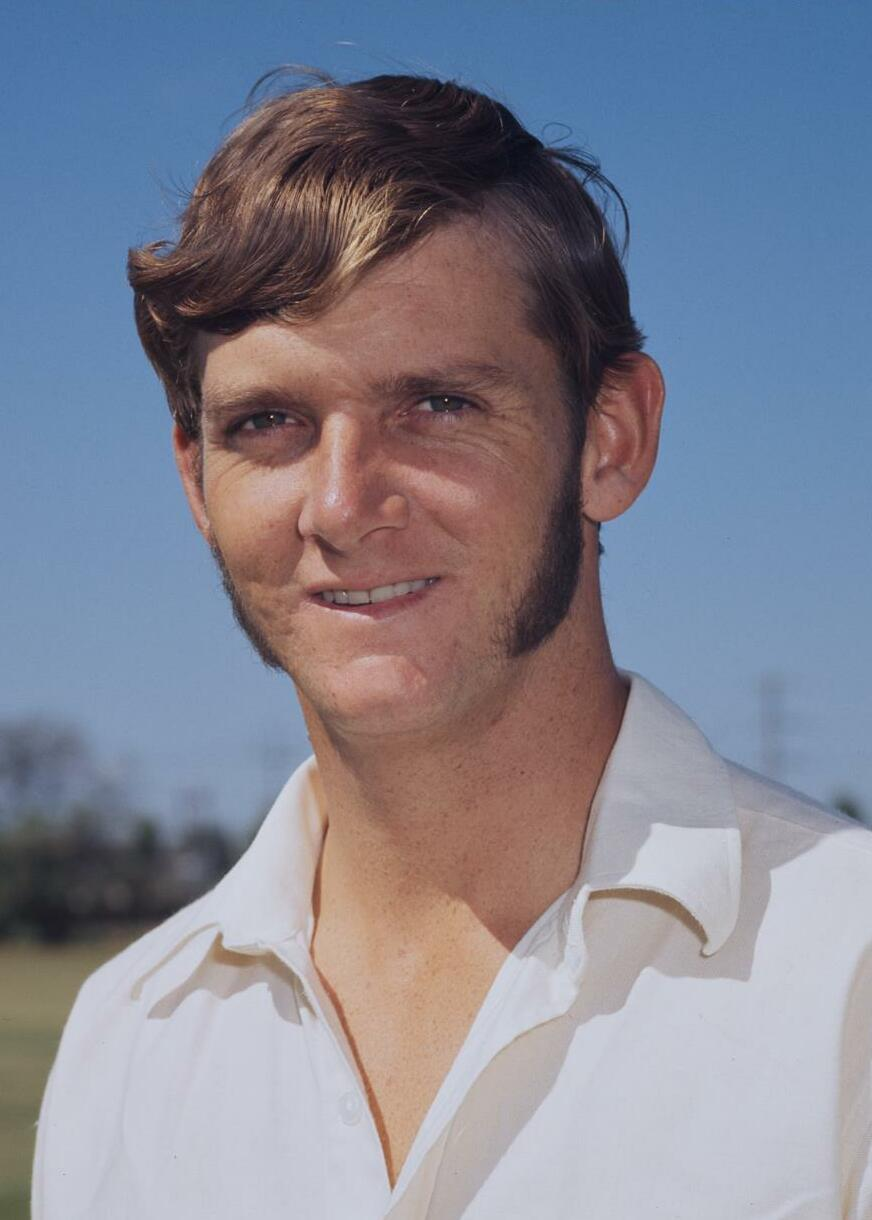
Bob Massie (pictured) holds the Australian record for the best bowling figures in a Test match with 16/137 taken in the second Test of the 1972 Ashes series.

A bowler's bowling figures in a match is the sum of the wickets taken and the runs conceded over both innings.

No bowler in the history of Test cricket has taken all 20 wickets in a match. The closest to do so was English spin bowler Jim Laker. During the fourth Test of the 1956 Ashes series, Laker took 9/37 in the first innings and 10/53 in the second to finish with match figures of 19/90. Bob Massie's figures of 16/137, taken in second match of the 1972 Ashes series, is the fourth-best in Test cricket history.

Best figures in a Test match by Australian bowlers
Rank	Figures	Player	Opposition	Venue	Date
1	16/137	Bob Massie	England	Lord's, London, England	22 June 1972
2	14/90	Fred Spofforth	England	The Oval, London, England	28 August 1882
3	14/199	Clarrie Grimmett	South Africa	Adelaide Oval, Adelaide, Australia	29 January 1932
4	13/77	Monty Noble	England	Melbourne Cricket Ground, Melbourne, Australia	1 January 1902
5	13/110	Fred Spofforth	England	Melbourne Cricket Ground, Melbourne, Australia	2 January 1879
Last updated: 30 November 2024

=== Best career average ===
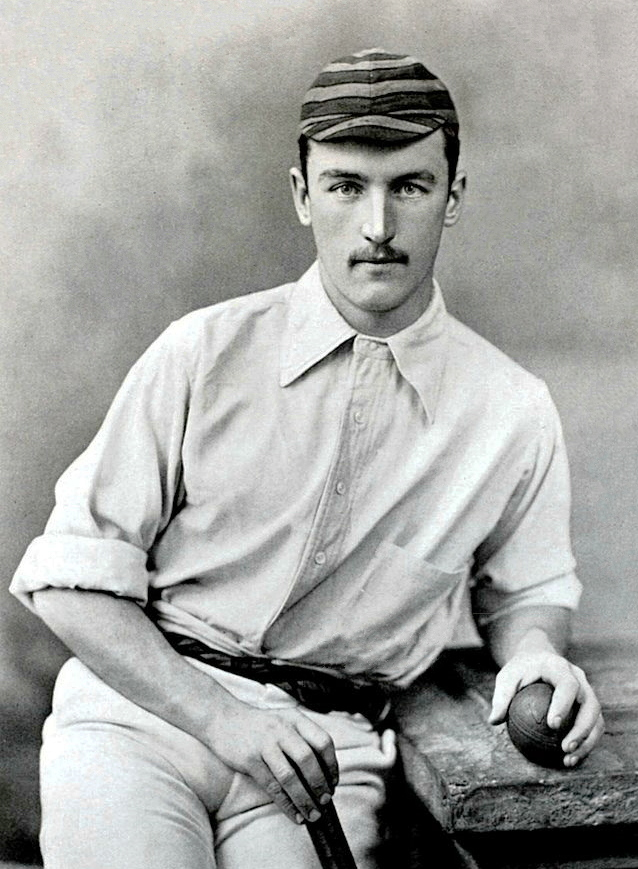
J. J. Ferris (pictured) holds the Australian record for the best Test career bowling average with 14.25 runs per wicket.

A bowler's bowling average is the total number of runs they have conceded divided by the number of wickets they have taken.

Nineteenth century English medium pacer George Lohmann holds the record for the best career average in Test cricket with 10.75. J. J. Ferris, one of seventeen cricketers to have played Test cricket for more than one team, is second behind Lohmann with an overall career average of 12.70 runs per wicket.

Best career Test average by Australian bowlers
Rank	Average	Player	Wickets	Runs	Balls	Period
1	14.25	J. J. Ferris	48	684	2,030	1887–1890
2	16.53	Charles Turner	101	1,670	5,179	1887–1895
3	17.97	Bert Ironmonger	74	1,330	4,695	1928–1933
4	18.41	Fred Spofforth	94	1,731	4,185	1877–1887
5	18.44	Scott Boland †	87	1,605	3,365	2021–2026
Qualification: 2,000 balls. Last updated: 4 November 2026

=== Best career economy rate ===
A bowler's economy rate is the total number of runs they have conceded divided by the number of overs they have bowled.

English bowler William Attewell, who played 10 matches for England between 1884 and 1892, holds the Test record for the best career economy rate with 1.31. Australia's Bert Ironmonger, with a rate of 1.69 runs per over conceded over his 14-match Test career, is fifth on the list.

Best career Test economy rate by Australian bowlers
Rank	Economy rate	Player	Runs	Balls	Wickets	Period
1	1.69	Bert Ironmonger	1,330	4,695	74	1928–1933
2	1.78	Ken Mackay	1,721	5,792	50	1956–1963
3	1.88	Ernie Toshack	989	3,140	47	1946–1948
4	1.93	Charles Turner	1,670	5,179	101	1887–1895
5	1.94	Bill O'Reilly	3,254	10,024	144	1932–1946
Qualification: 2,000 balls. Last updated: 30 November 2024

=== Best career strike rate ===
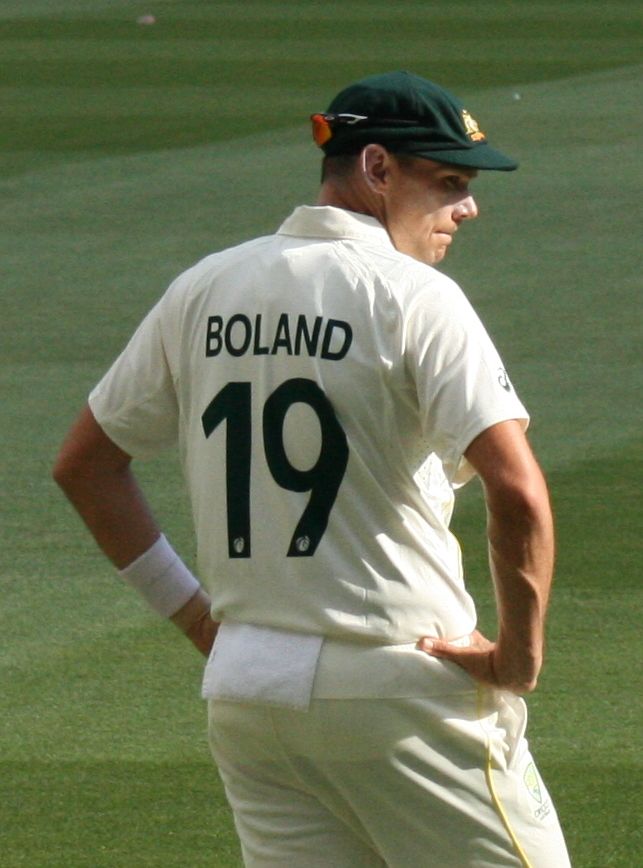
Scott Boland (pictured) holds the Australian record for the best strike rate with 38.67 balls per wicket.

A bowler's strike rate is the total number of balls they have bowled divided by the number of wickets they have taken.

As with the career average above, George Lohmann is the bowler with the best Test career strike rate at 34.19. He is followed by currently active West Indian right-arm fast bowler Shamar Joseph on 36.89, as of November 2026, and J. J. Ferris whose overall career strike rate was 37.73. Scott Boland, the currently semi active right-arm fast-medium bowler, who has the best strike rate for Australia with 38.67, sits fifth on the list, as of November 2026.

Best career Test strike rate by Australian bowlers
Rank	Strike rate	Player	Wickets	Balls	Runs	Period
1	38.67	Scott Boland †	82	3,365	1,605	2021–2026
2	42.29	J. J. Ferris	48	2,030	684	1887–1890
3	44.52	Fred Spofforth	94	4,185	1,731	1877–1887
4	45.12	Jack Saunders	79	3,565	1,796	1902–1908
5	45.43	Mitchell Starc †	460	20,899	11,948	2011–2026
Qualification: 2,000 balls. Last updated: 4 November 2026

=== Most five-wicket hauls in an innings ===
A five-wicket haul refers to a bowler taking five wickets in a single innings.

Sri Lanka's Muttiah Muralitharan tops the table in five-wicket hauls in Test cricket taking 67 throughout his career. He is followed jointly by the late Shane Warne and the recently retired right-arm off spinner for India Ravichandran Ashwin who took his 37th five-wicket haul in September 2024.

Most Test five-wicket hauls in an innings by Australian bowlers
Rank	Five-wicket hauls	Player	Innings	Balls	Wickets	Period
1	37	Shane Warne	273	40,705	708	1992–2007
2	29	Glenn McGrath	243	29,248	563	1993–2007
3	24	Nathan Lyon †	269	35,771	577	2011–2026
4	23	Dennis Lillee	132	18,467	355	1971–1984
5	21	Clarrie Grimmett	67	14,513	216	1925–1936
Last updated: 4 November 2026

=== Most ten-wicket hauls in a match ===
A ten-wicket haul refers to a bowler taking ten or more wickets in a match over two innings.

Shane Warne is second only to Muttiah Muralitharan of Sri Lanka in taking the most ten-wicket hauls in Test cricket with Muralitharan having taken 22 to Warne's 10.

Most Test ten-wicket hauls in a match by Australian bowlers
Rank	Ten-wicket hauls	Player	Matches	Innings	Wickets	Period
1	10	Shane Warne	145	273	708	1992–2007
2	7	Clarrie Grimmett	37	67	216	1925–1936
2	7	Dennis Lillee	70	132	355	1971–1984
4	5	Nathan Lyon †	145	269	577	2011–2026
5	4	Fred Spofforth	18	30	94	1877–1887
5	4	Mitchell Starc †	110	211	460	2011–2026
Last updated: 4 November 2026

=== Worst figures in an innings ===
The worst figures in a single innings in Test cricket came in the third Test between the West Indies at home to Pakistan in 1958. Pakistan's Khan Mohammad returned figures of 0/259 from his 54 overs in the second innings of the match. The worst figures by an Australian is 0/156 that came off the bowling of Mitchell Swepson in his debut Test in March 2022 against Pakistan.

Worst figures in a Test innings by Australian bowlers
Rank	Figures	Player	Overs	Opposition	Venue	Date
1	0/156	Mitchell Swepson	53.4	Pakistan	National Stadium, Karachi, Pakistan	12 March 2022
2	0/149	Bryce McGain	18	South Africa	Newlands Cricket Ground, Cape Town, South Africa	19 March 2009
3	0/147	Shane Warne	42	India	Eden Gardens, Kolkata, India	18 March 1998
4	0/146	Nathan Lyon †	34	South Africa	WACA Ground, Perth, Australia	3 November 2016
5	0/146	Stuart MacGill	38	India	Sydney Cricket Ground, Sydney, Australia	2 January 2004
Last updated: 30 November 2024

=== Worst figures in a match ===
The worst figures in a match in Test cricket were taken by South Africa's Imran Tahir in the second Test against Australia at the Adelaide Oval in November 2012. He returned figures of 0/180 from his 23 overs in the first innings and 0/80 off 14 in the third innings for a total of 0/260 from 37 overs. He claimed the record in his final over when two runs came from it – enough for him to pass the previous record of 0/259, set 54 years prior.

The worst figures by an Australian came in the first Test of the 2010–11 Ashes series when Mitchell Johnson returned figures of 0/66 and 0/104 for a total of 0/170 off 42 overs, equalling the figures that Geoff Lawson set in the second Test of the Ashes series of 1986–87 from 50 overs.

Worst figures in a Test match by Australian bowlers
Rank	Figures	Player	Overs	Opposition	Venue	Date
1	0/170	Mitchell Johnson	42	England	The Gabba, Brisbane, Australia	25 November 2010
2	0/170	Geoff Lawson	50	England	WACA Ground, Perth, Australia	28 November 1986
3	0/162	Tim Wall	45	England	Old Trafford, Manchester, England	6 July 1934
4	0/160	Steve Waugh	51	West Indies	WACA Ground, Perth, Australia	2 December 1988
5	0/157	Lindsay Kline	33 (Note: 8 ball overs)	West Indies	Adelaide Oval, Adelaide, Australia	27 January 1961
Last updated: 30 November 2024

=== Most wickets in a series ===
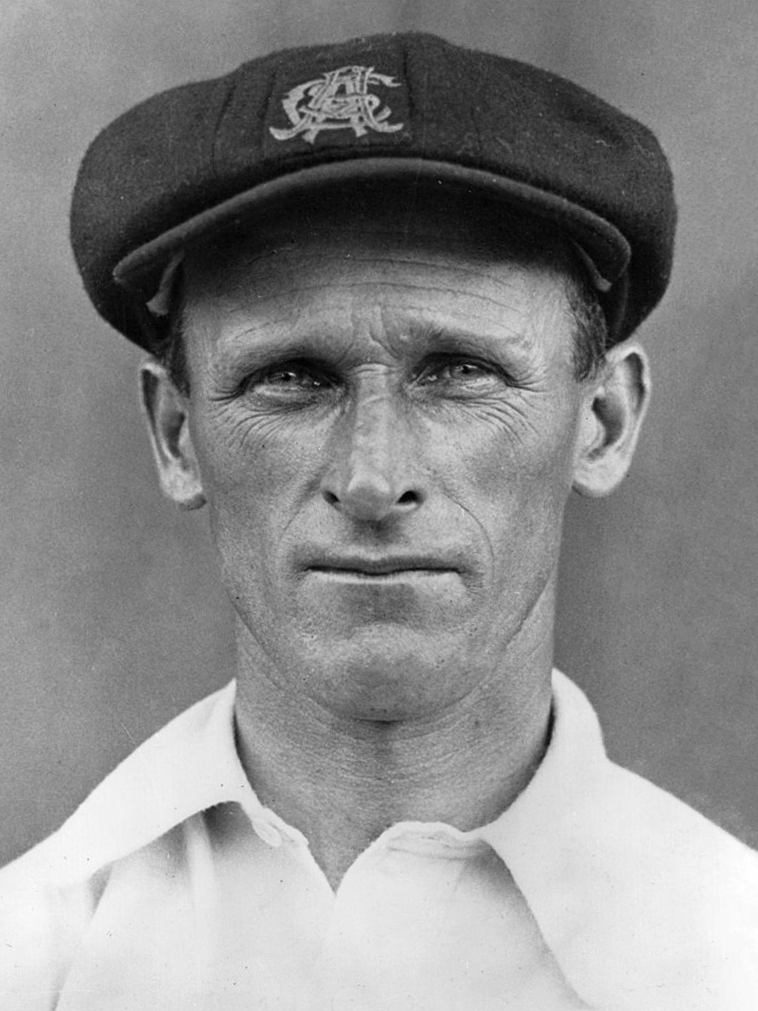
Clarrie Grimmett (pictured) took 44 wickets in the 1935–36 series against South Africa, the most by any Australian cricketer in a Test series.

England's seventh Test tour of South Africa in 1913–14 saw the record set for the most wickets taken by a bowler in a Test series. English paceman Sydney Barnes played in four of the five matches and achieved a total of 49 wickets to his name. Jim Laker sits second on the list with 46 wickets taken during the 1956 Ashes series. Australia's Clarrie Grimmett is third with his 44 wickets taken against South Africa during the 1935–36 tour.

Most wickets in a Test series by Australian bowlers
Rank	Wickets	Player	Matches	Innings	Series
1	44	Clarrie Grimmett	5	10	Australian cricket team in South Africa in 1935–36
2	42	Terry Alderman	6	12	1981 Ashes series
3	41	Rodney Hogg	6	11	1978–79 Ashes series
3	41	Terry Alderman	6	11	1989 Ashes series
5	40	Shane Warne	5	10	2005 Ashes series
Last updated: 30 November 2024

== Wicket-keeping records ==
The wicket-keeper is a specialist fielder who stands behind the stumps being guarded by the batsman on strike and is the only member of the fielding side allowed to wear gloves and leg pads.

=== Most career dismissals ===
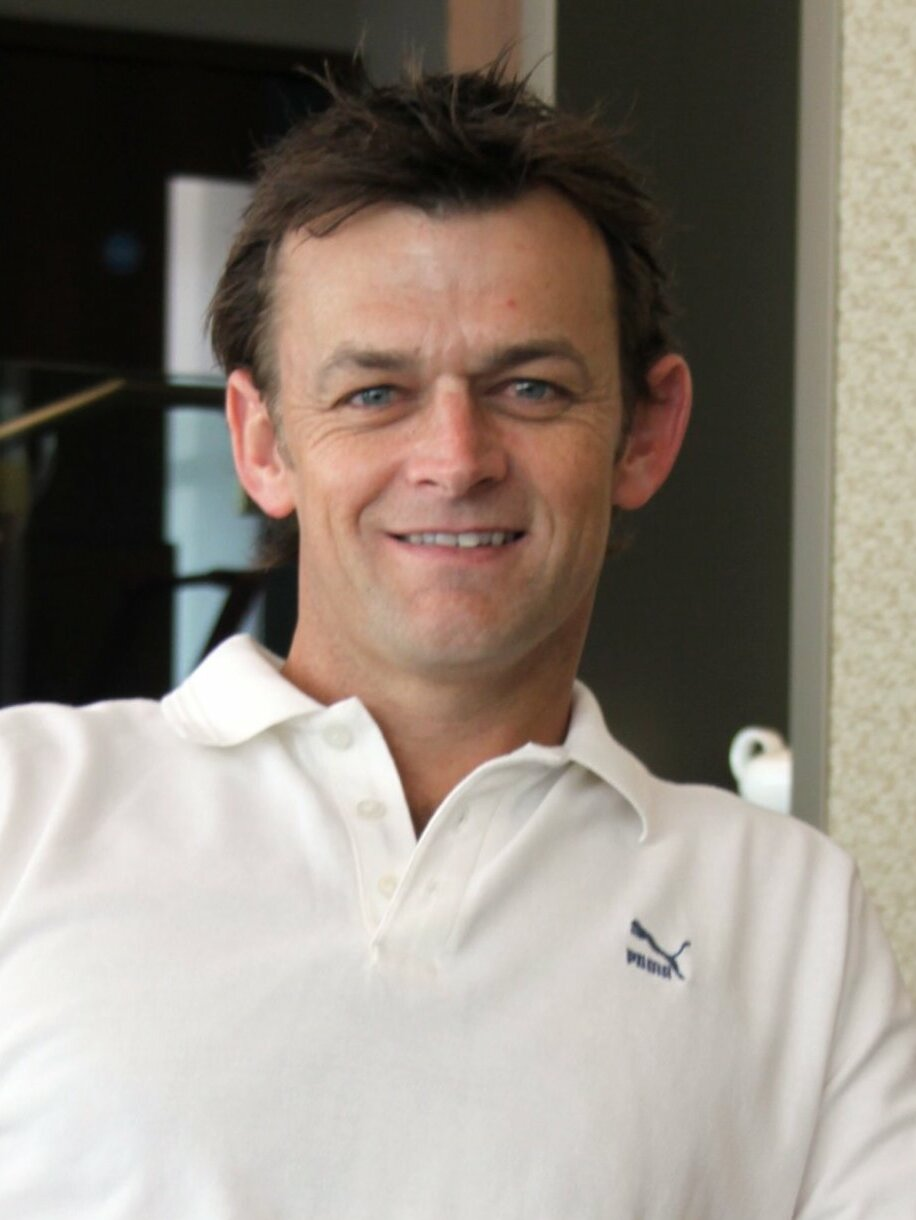
Adam Gilchrist (pictured) has taken the most wicket-keeping Test dismissals (416) for Australia.

A wicket-keeper can be credited with the dismissal of a batsman in two ways, caught or stumped. A fair catch is taken when the ball is caught fully within the field of play without it bouncing after the ball has touched the striker's bat or glove holding the bat, while a stumping occurs when the wicket-keeper puts down the wicket while the batsman is out of his ground and not attempting a run.

Australia's Adam Gilchrist is second only to South Africa's Mark Boucher in taking most dismissals in Test cricket as a designated wicket-keeper, with Boucher taking 555 to Gilchrist 416.

Most career Test dismissals by Australian wicket-keepers
Rank	Dismissals	Player	Matches	Period
1	416	Adam Gilchrist	96	1999–2008
2	395	Ian Healy	119	1988–1999
3	355	Rod Marsh	96	1970–1984
4	270	Brad Haddin	66	2008–2015
5	221	Alex Carey †	53	2021–2026
Last updated: 4 November 2026

=== Most career catches ===
Boucher also leads Gilchrist in the number of catches taken as a designated wicket-keeper in Test cricket, 532 to 379.

Most career Test catches by Australian wicket-keepers
Rank	Catches	Player	Matches	Period
1	379	Adam Gilchrist	96	1999–2008
2	366	Ian Healy	119	1988–1999
3	343	Rod Marsh	96	1970–1984
4	262	Brad Haddin	66	2008–2015
5	201	Alex Carey †	53	2021–2026
Last updated: 4 November 2026

=== Most career stumpings ===
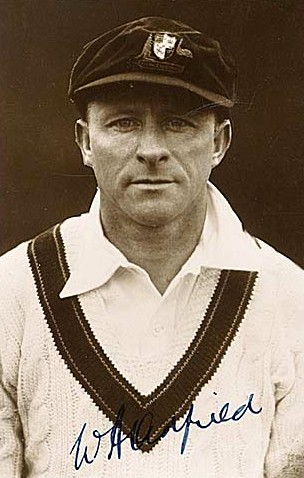
Bert Oldfield (pictured) holds the record for the most stumpings in Test cricket with 52.

Bert Oldfield, Australia's fifth-most capped wicket-keeper, holds the record for the most stumpings in Test cricket with 52. He is followed by England's Godfrey Evans with 46 to his name. Indian glovemen Syed Kirmani and MS Dhoni are both equal third on 38 and Gilchrist is fifth on the list with 37.

Most career Test stumpings by Australian wicket-keepers
Rank	Stumpings	Player	Matches	Period
1	52 ♠	Bert Oldfield	54	1920–1937
2	37	Adam Gilchrist	96	1999–2008
3	29	Ian Healy	119	1988–1999
4	24	Jack Blackham	32	1877–1894
4	24	Wally Grout	51	1957–1966
Last updated: 30 November 2024

=== Most dismissals in an innings ===
Five wicket-keepers have taken seven dismissals in a single innings in a Test match—Wasim Bari of Pakistan in 1979, Englishman Bob Taylor in 1980, New Zealand's Ian Smith in 1991, the West Indies Ridley Jacobs in 2000 and most recently West Indian gloveman Joshua Da Silva against South Africa in 2023.

The feat of taking 6 dismissals in an innings has been achieved by 26 wicket-keepers on 34 occasions including 5 Australians.

Most dismissals in a Test innings by Australian wicket-keepers
Rank	Dismissals	Player	Opposition	Venue	Date
1	6	Wally Grout	South Africa	Wanderers Stadium, Johannesburg, South Africa	23 December 1957
1	6	Rod Marsh	England	The Gabba, Brisbane, Australia	26 November 1982
1	6	Ian Healy	England	Edgbaston Cricket Ground, Birmingham, England	5 June 1997
1	6	Brad Haddin	India	The Gabba, Brisbane, Australia	17 December 2014
1	6	Alex Carey	West Indies	Adelaide Oval, Adelaide, Australia	8 December 2022
Last updated: 30 November 2024

=== Most dismissals in a series ===
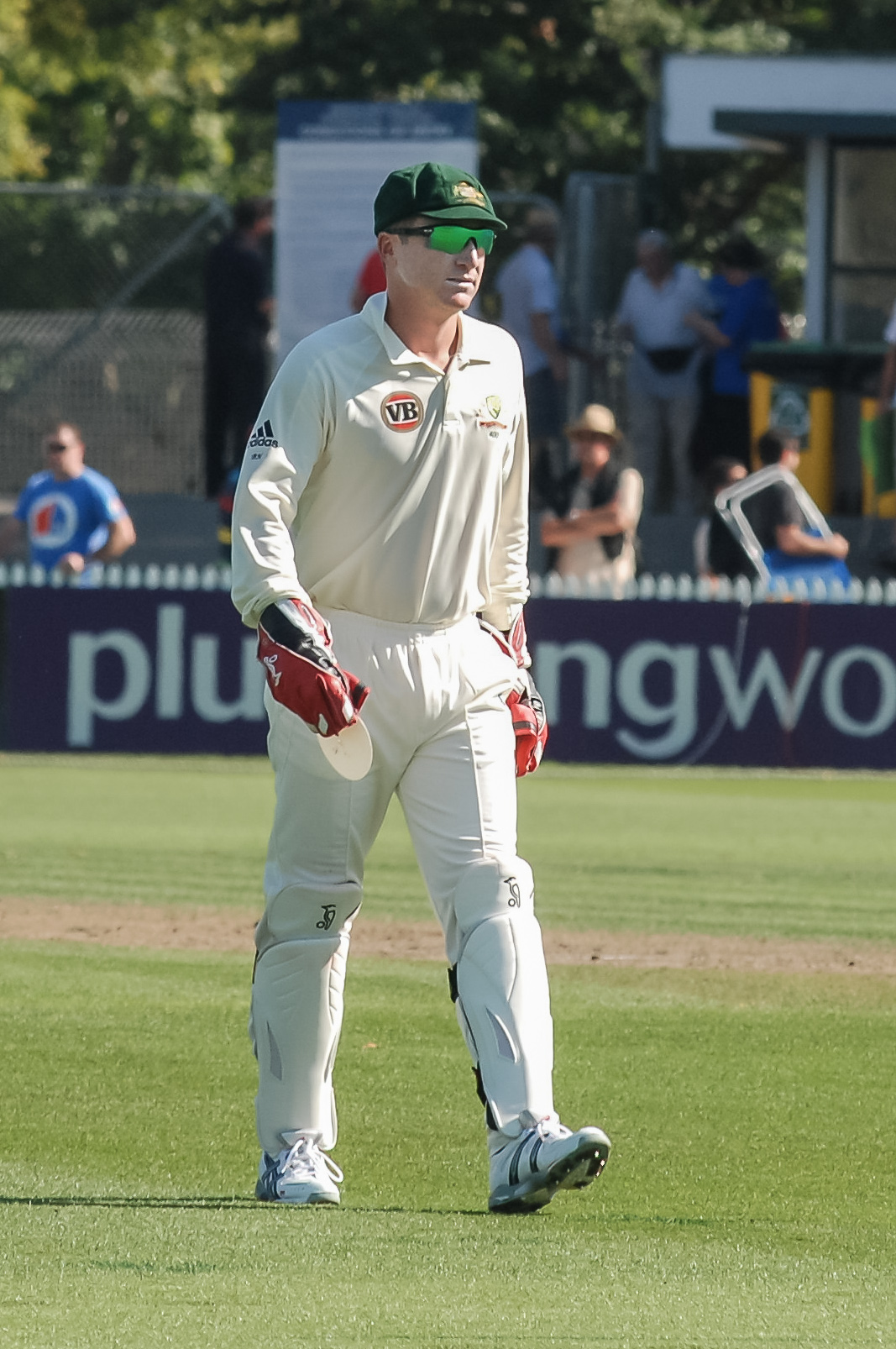
Brad Haddin (pictured) with 29 catches taken during the 2013 Ashes series holds the Test cricket record for the most dismissals taken by a wicket-keeper in a series.

Brad Haddin holds the Test cricket record for the most dismissals by a wicket-keeper in a series. He took 29 catches during the 2013 Ashes series which broke the previous record held by fellow Australian Rod Marsh where he took 28 catches in the 1982–83 Ashes series. Alex Carey, the current Australian Test wicket-keeper, as of November 2026, equalled Marsh's total with 27 dismissals and 1 stumping in the 2025–26 Ashes series.

Most dismissals in a Test series by Australian wicket-keepers
Rank	Dismissals	Player	Matches	Innings	Series
1	29 ♠	Brad Haddin	5	10	2013 Ashes series
2	28	Alex Carey	5	10	2025–26 Ashes series
2	28	Rod Marsh	5	10	1982–83 Ashes series
4	27	Ian Healy	6	12	1997 Ashes series
5	26	Alex Carey	5	9	2023 Ashes series
5	26	Tim Paine	5	9	2017–18 Ashes series
5	26	Adam Gilchrist	5	10	2001 Ashes series
5	26	Adam Gilchrist	5	10	2006–07 Ashes series
5	26	Rod Marsh	6	11	West Indian cricket team in Australia in 1975–76
5	26	Ian Healy	6	12	1993 Ashes series
Last updated: 11 January 2026

== Fielding records ==
=== Most career catches ===
Caught is one of the nine methods a batsman can be dismissed in cricket. (Note: In 2017, The Laws of Cricket were amended, reducing the methods of dismissals from ten to nine, with handled the ball now covered as part of obstructing the field.) A fair catch is defined as a fielder catching the ball, from a legal delivery, fully within the field of play without it bouncing when the ball has touched the striker's bat or glove holding the bat. The majority of catches are caught in the slips, located behind the batsman, next to the wicket-keeper, on the off side of the field. Most slip fielders are top order batsmen.

During the 2024–25 tour of Sri Lanka, stand-in captain Steve Smith surpassed Ricky Ponting's Australian record of 196 catches and drew equal with South Africa's Jacques Kallis with 200 Test career catches. He currently holds the record for the most catches in Test cricket by a non-wicket-keeper with 224 just ahead of currently active Joe Root of England on 220, as of November 2026.

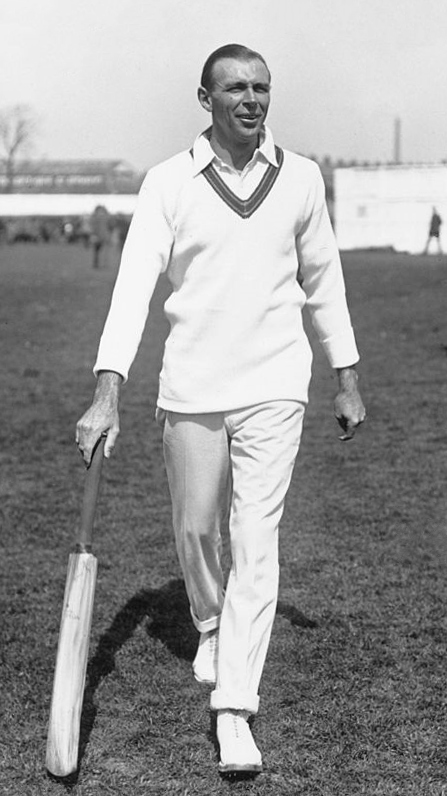
Jack Gregory (pictured) took 15 catches during Australia's 5–0 whitewash of England in the 1920–21 Ashes series – a Test cricket record.

Most career Test catches by Australian non-wicket-keepers
Rank	Catches	Player	Matches	Innings	Period
1	224	Steve Smith †	127	242	2010–2026
2	196	Ricky Ponting	168	328	1995–2012
3	181	Mark Waugh	128	245	1991–2002
4	157	Mark Taylor	104	197	1989–1999
5	156	Allan Border	156	277	1978–1994
Last updated: 4 November 2026

=== Most catches in a series ===
The 1920–21 Ashes series, in which Australia whitewashed England 5–0 for the first time, saw the record set for the most catches taken by a non-wicket-keeper in a Test series. Australian all-rounder Jack Gregory took 15 catches in the series as well as 23 wickets. Fellow Australians Greg Chappell and Steve Smith and India's KL Rahul are all equal second behind Gregory with 14 catches taken during the 1974–75 Ashes series, the 2025–26 Ashes series and the 2018 Indian tour of England respectively. Four players have taken 13 catches in a series on six occasions with both Bob Simpson and Brian Lara having done so twice and Rahul Dravid and Alastair Cook once.

Most catches in a Test series by Australian non-wicket-keepers
Rank	Catches	Player	Matches	Innings	Series
1	15 ♠	Jack Gregory	5	10	1920–21 Ashes series
2	14	Steve Smith	4	8	2025–26 Ashes series
2	14	Greg Chappell	6	11	1974–75 Ashes series
4	13	Bob Simpson	5	9	Australian cricket team in South Africa in 1957–58
4	13	Bob Simpson	5	10	West Indian cricket team in Australia in 1960–61
Last updated: 11 January 2026

== Other records ==
=== Most career matches ===
India's Sachin Tendulkar holds the record for the most Test matches played with 200. He is followed by the English fast bowler James Anderson who played his 188th and final Test match in July 2024, with former captains Ricky Ponting and Steve Waugh being joint third with each having represented Australia on 168 occasions. A total of 16 cricketers have played 100 Tests for Australia.

Most career Test matches by Australian cricketers
Rank	Matches	Player	Period
1	168	Ricky Ponting	1995–2012
1	168	Steve Waugh	1985–2004
3	156	Allan Border	1978–1994
4	145	Shane Warne	1992–2007
4	145	Nathan Lyon †	2011–2026
Last updated: 4 November 2026

=== Most consecutive career matches ===
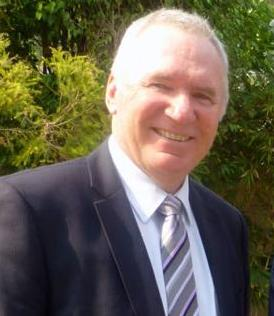
Allan Border (pictured) holds the Australian record for the most consecutive career Test matches and the most matches as captain of Australia with 153 and 93, respectively.

Former English captain Alastair Cook holds the record for the most consecutive Test matches played with 159. He broke Allan Border's long standing record of 153 matches in June 2018. Mark Waugh, the Australian middle order batsman who played 107 consecutive Test matches, is third. The recently retired New Zealand wicket-keeper-batsman Brendon McCullum, who is fifth on the list with 101 matches, is the highest ranked cricketer who never missed a Test match during his playing career. Adam Gilchrist, in seventh on 96, is the highest ranked Australian player to achieve the feat.

Most consecutive career Test matches by Australian cricketers
Rank	Matches	Player	Period
1	153	Allan Border	1979–1994
2	107	Mark Waugh	1993–2002
3	100	Nathan Lyon	2011–2023
4	96	Adam Gilchrist	1999–2008
5	86	Matthew Hayden	2000–2008
Last updated: 30 November 2024

=== Most matches as captain ===
Graeme Smith, who led the South African cricket team from 2003 to 2014, holds the record for the most matches played as captain in Test cricket with 109. Allan Border, who skippered Australia from 1984 to 1994 is second with 93 matches. New Zealand's captain from 1997 to 2006, Stephen Fleming, is third on the list with 80 and in fourth on 77 is Australia's Ricky Ponting who led the side for six years from 2004 to 2010.

Most career Test matches by Australian captains
Rank	Matches	Player	Period
1	93	Allan Border	1984–1994
2	77	Ricky Ponting	2004–2010
3	57	Steve Waugh	1999–2004
4	50	Mark Taylor	1994–1999
5	48	Greg Chappell	1975–1983
Last updated: 30 November 2024

=== Youngest players ===
The youngest player to play in a Test match is claimed to be Hasan Raza at the age of 14 years and 227 days. Making his debut for Pakistan against Zimbabwe on 24 October 1996, there is some doubt as to the validity of Raza's age at the time. The youngest Australian to play Test cricket was Ian Craig who at the age of 17 years and 239 days debuted in the final Test of the series against South Africa in February 1953.

Youngest Test cricketers to play for Australia
Rank	Age	Player	Opposition	Venue	Date
1	17 years and 239 days	Ian Craig	South Africa	Melbourne Cricket Ground, Melbourne, Australia	6 February 1953
2	18 years and 193 days	Pat Cummins	South Africa	Wanderers Stadium, Johannesburg, South Africa	17 November 2011
3	18 years and 232 days	Tom Garrett	England	Melbourne Cricket Ground, Melbourne, Australia	15 March 1877
4	19 years and 85 days	Sam Konstas	India	Melbourne Cricket Ground, Melbourne, Australia	26 December 2024
5	19 years and 96 days	Clem Hill	England	Lord's, London, England	22 June 1896
Last updated: 26 December 2024

=== Oldest players on debut ===
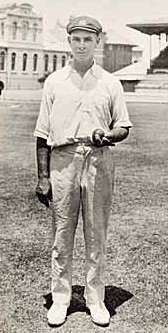
Bert Ironmonger (pictured here in his 40s) is the oldest Australian cricketer to play in a Test match and was the second-oldest to make his debut for Australia.

At 49 years and 119 days, James Southerton of England, playing in the very first Test match in March 1877, is the oldest player to make his debut in Test cricket. Second on the list is Miran Bakhsh of Pakistan who at 47 years and 284 days made his debut against India in 1955. Australia's Don Blackie is the third-oldest player to make his debut, breaking into the side during the second Test of the 1928–29 Ashes series at the age of 46 years and 253 days. He broke the record set by his teammate Bert Ironmonger who debuted in the previous Test match two weeks earlier.

Oldest Test cricketers to make their debut for Australia
Rank	Age	Player	Opposition	Venue	Date
1	46 years and 253 days	Don Blackie	England	Sydney Cricket Ground, Sydney, Australia	14 December 1928
2	46 years and 237 days	Bert Ironmonger	England	Brisbane Exhibition Ground, Brisbane, Australia	30 November 1928
3	38 years and 35 days	Bob Holland	West Indies	The Gabba, Brisbane, Australia	23 November 1984
4	37 years and 290 days	Ned Gregory	England	Melbourne Cricket Ground, Melbourne, Australia	15 March 1877
4	37 years and 290 days	Nat Thomson	England	Melbourne Cricket Ground, Melbourne, Australia	15 March 1877
Last updated: 30 November 2024

=== Oldest players ===
England all-rounder Wilfred Rhodes is the oldest player to appear in a Test match. Playing in the fourth Test against the West Indies in 1930 at Sabina Park, in Kingston, Jamaica, he was aged 52 years and 165 days on the final day's play. The second-oldest Test player is Bert Ironmonger who was aged 50 years and 327 days when he represented Australia for the final time in the fifth Test of the 1932–33 Ashes series at the Sydney Cricket Ground.

Oldest Test cricketers to play for Australia
Rank	Age	Player	Opposition	Venue	Date
1	50 years and 327 days	Bert Ironmonger	England	Sydney Cricket Ground, Sydney, Australia	23 February 1933
2	46 years and 309 days	Don Blackie	England	Adelaide Oval, Adelaide, Australia	1 February 1929
3	44 years and 69 days	Clarrie Grimmett	South Africa	Kingsmead Cricket Ground, Durban, South Africa	28 February 1936
4	43 years and 259 days	Sammy Carter	South Africa	Newlands Cricket Ground, Cape Town, South Africa	26 November 1921
5	43 years and 255 days	Warren Bardsley	England	The Oval, London, England	14 August 1926
Last updated: 30 November 2024

== Partnership records ==
In cricket, two batsmen are always present at the crease batting together in a partnership. This partnership will continue until one of them is dismissed, retires or the innings comes to a close.

=== Highest partnerships by wicket ===
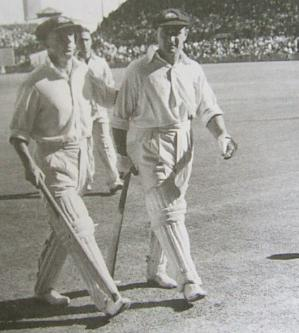
Don Bradman (left) and Sid Barnes (right) set the highest fifth wicket partnership in Test cricket, scoring 405 against England in 1946.

A wicket partnership describes the number of runs scored before each wicket falls. The first wicket partnership is between the opening batsmen and continues until the first wicket falls. The second wicket partnership then commences between the not out batsman and the number three batsman. This partnership continues until the second wicket falls. The third wicket partnership then commences between the not out batsman and the new batsman. This continues down to the tenth wicket partnership. When the tenth wicket has fallen, there is no batsman left to partner, so the innings is closed.

The Australian pair of Sid Barnes and Don Bradman came together in the second Test of the 1946–47 Ashes series at the Sydney Cricket Ground and put together a fifth wicket partnership of 405 runs—the oldest of the Test wicket partnerships records.

Highest Test partnerships by wicket by Australian batsmen
Wicket	Runs	First batsman	Second batsman	Opposition	Venue	Date
1st wicket	382	Bill Lawry	Bob Simpson	West Indies	Kensington Oval, Bridgetown, Barbados	5 May 1965
2nd wicket	451	Bill Ponsford	Don Bradman	England	The Oval, London, England	18 August 1934
3rd wicket	315	Ricky Ponting	Darren Lehmann	West Indies	Queen's Park Oval, Port of Spain, Trinidad and Tobago	19 April 2003
4th wicket	449	Adam Voges	Shaun Marsh	West Indies	Bellerive Oval, Hobart, Australia	10 December 2015
5th wicket	405 ♠	Sid Barnes	Don Bradman	England	Sydney Cricket Ground, Sydney, Australia	13 December 1946
6th wicket	346	Jack Fingleton	Don Bradman	England	Melbourne Cricket Ground, Melbourne, Australia	1 January 1937
7th wicket	217	Doug Walters	Gary Gilmour	New Zealand	Lancaster Park, Christchurch, New Zealand	18 February 1977
8th wicket	243	Roger Hartigan	Clem Hill	England	Adelaide Oval, Adelaide, Australia	10 January 1908
9th wicket	154	Syd Gregory	Jack Blackham	England	Sydney Cricket Ground, Sydney, Australia	14 December 1894
10th wicket	163	Phillip Hughes	Ashton Agar	England	Trent Bridge, Nottingham, England	10 July 2013
Last updated: 30 November 2024

=== Highest partnerships by runs ===
The highest Test partnership by runs for any wicket is held by the Sri Lankan pairing of Kumar Sangakkara and Mahela Jayawardene who put together a third wicket partnership of 624 runs during the first Test against South Africa in July 2006. This broke the record of 576 runs set by their compatriots Sanath Jayasuriya and Roshan Mahanama against India in 1997. Equal fifth on the list is Mudassar Nazar and Javed Miandad of Pakistan who together scored 451 against India in 1983 and the Australian pairing of Bill Ponsford and Don Bradman putting on the same score against England in the 1934 Ashes series.

Highest Test partnerships by runs by Australian batsmen
Wicket	Runs	First batsman	Second batsman	Opposition	Venue	Date
2nd wicket	451	Bill Ponsford	Don Bradman	England	The Oval, London, England	18 August 1934
4th wicket	449	Adam Voges	Shaun Marsh	West Indies	Bellerive Oval, Hobart, Australia	10 December 2015
5th wicket	405	Sid Barnes	Don Bradman	England	Sydney Cricket Ground, Sydney, Australia	13 December 1946
4th wicket	388	Bill Ponsford	Don Bradman	England	Headingley, Leeds, England	20 July 1934
4th wicket	386	Ricky Ponting	Michael Clarke	India	Adelaide Oval, Adelaide, Australia	24 January 2012
Last updated: 30 November 2024

== Umpiring records ==
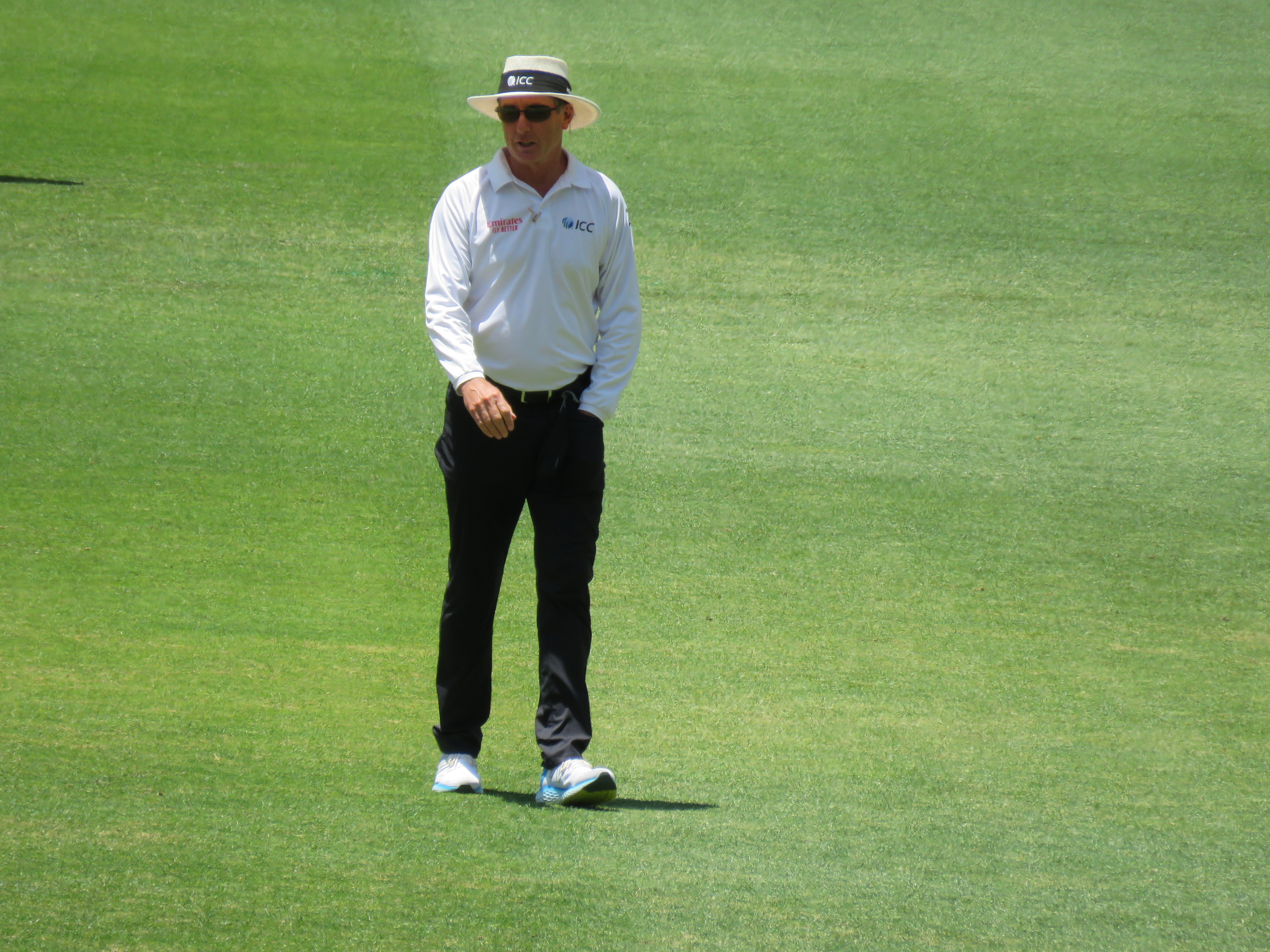
Rod Tucker (pictured) holds the Australian record for the most Test matches umpired with 102, as of November 2026.

=== Most matches umpired ===
An umpire in cricket is a person who officiates the match according to the Laws of Cricket. Two umpires adjudicate the match on the field, whilst a third umpire has access to video replays, and a fourth umpire looks after the match balls and other duties. The records below are only for on-field umpires.

Aleem Dar of Pakistan holds the record for the most Test matches umpired with 145. Dar set the record in December 2019 overtaking West Indian Steve Bucknor's mark of 128 matches. They are followed by South Africa's Rudi Koertzen who officiated in 108. The most experienced Australian is Rod Tucker who is fourth on the list with 102 Test matches umpired. Tucker eclipsed Daryl Harper's Australian record of 95 matches when he stood in his 96th Test in October 2025, the first Test between South Africa and Pakistan.

Most Test matches umpired by Australian umpires
Rank	Matches	Umpire	Period
1	102	Rod Tucker †	2010–2026
2	95	Daryl Harper	1998–2011
3	81	Paul Reiffel †	2008–2026
4	78	Darrell Hair	1992–2008
5	74	Simon Taufel	2000–2012
Last updated: 4 November 2026

== See also ==
- List of Australia One Day International cricket records
- List of Australia Twenty20 International cricket records
