= Australian cricket team in South Africa in 2001–02 =

International cricket tour

	South Africa	Australia
- Dates: 17 February – 9 April 2002
Captains	Mark Boucher (Tests); Shaun Pollock (ODIs)	Steve Waugh (Tests); Ricky Ponting (ODIs)

Test series
- Result: Australia won the 3-match series 2–1
Most runs	Herschelle Gibbs (287)	Adam Gilchrist (473)
Most wickets	Jacques Kallis (11); Makhaya Ntini (11)	Shane Warne (20)
- Player of the series: Adam Gilchrist (Aus)

One Day International series
- Results: Australia won the 7-match series 5–1
Most runs	Jonty Rhodes (338)	Ricky Ponting (283)
Most wickets	Nicky Boje (9); Makhaya Ntini (9); Shaun Pollock (9); Roger Telemachus (9)	Jason Gillespie (12)
- Player of the series: Ricky Ponting (Aus)

The Australia cricket team toured South Africa between February and April 2002 to play three Test and seven ODI matches. Australia won the Test series 2–1 and the ODI series 5–1.

== Tour matches ==
=== Three-day match: South Africa A v Australians ===
17–19 February 2002
Scorecard

Australians	v	South Africa A
366/8d (98.5 overs); Ricky Ponting 120 (155); Andrew Hall 5/97 (25 overs)		190 (68 overs); Ashwell Prince 92 (175); Glenn McGrath 5/17 (15 overs)
95/3 (27 overs); Justin Langer 45 (77); Claude Henderson 3/41 (13 overs)

Match drawn
Senwes Park, Potchefstroom
Umpires: Rudi Koertzen (SA) and Ian Howell (SA)

- Australians won the toss and elected to bat.
- Matthew Hayden (Aus) scored his 17,000th first-class run.
- Steve Waugh (Aus) scored his 21,000th first-class run.

=== Four-day match: South Africa A v Australians ===
1–4 March 2002 (Note: While four days of play were scheduled, this tour match reached a result in three days.)
Scorecard

South Africa A	v	Australians
301 (92.3 overs); Daryll Cullinan 86 (151); Brett Lee 4/37 (14 overs)		574/9d (116.2 overs); Justin Langer 161 (264); Dewald Pretorius 5/148 (29 overs)
232 (60.3 overs); Justin Kemp 56 (72); Stuart MacGill 4/114 (22.3 overs)

Australians won by an innings and 41 runs
St George's Park Cricket Ground, Port Elizabeth
Umpires: Muhammed Nanabhay (SA) and Rudi Koertzen (SA)

- Australians won the toss and elected to field.

== Test series ==
=== 1st Test ===
22–26 February 2002 (Note: While five days of play were scheduled for each Test, the first and third Tests reached a result within three and four days, respectively.)
Scorecard

Australia	v	South Africa
652/7d (146 overs); Adam Gilchrist 204* (213); Jacques Kallis 2/116 (24 overs)		159 (48 overs); Ashwell Prince 49 (98); Glenn McGrath 3/28 (14 overs)
		133 (38.3 overs) (f/o); Herschelle Gibbs 47 (82); Glenn McGrath 5/21 (12.3 overs)

Australia won by an innings and 360 runs
Wanderers Stadium, Johannesburg
Umpires: Steve Bucknor (WI) and Rudi Koertzen (SA)
Player of the match: Adam Gilchrist (Aus)

- Australia won the toss and elected to bat.
- Ashwell Prince (SA) made his Test debut.
- Allan Donald (SA) played his final Test match.
- This was the largest victory by an innings in Tests for Australia.
- South Africa suffered their largest defeat by an innings in Tests.
- Adam Gilchrist (Aus) scored the fastest double-century in terms of balls faced in Tests (212), surpassing Ian Botham (220). The record was taken by Nathan Astle (212 balls) a few weeks later. Gilchrist's double-century was only the fifth by a designated wicket-keeper.
- Adam Gilchrist and Damien Martyn's (Aus) 317 was the highest Test sixth wicket partnership at the Wanderers Stadium.

=== 2nd Test ===
8–12 March 2002
Scorecard

South Africa	v	Australia
239 (80 overs); Andrew Hall 70 (141); Glenn McGrath 3/42 (20 overs)		382 (80.5 overs); Adam Gilchrist 138* (108); Makhaya Ntini 4/93 (22.5 overs)
473 (162 overs); Neil McKenzie 99 (227); Shane Warne 6/161 (70 overs)		334/6 (79.1 overs); Ricky Ponting 100* (160); Jacques Kallis 2/68 (17 overs)

Australia won by 4 wickets
Newlands Cricket Ground, Cape Town
Umpires: Steve Bucknor (WI) and Rudi Koertzen (SA)
Player of the match: Shane Warne (Aus)

- South Africa won the toss and elected to bat.
- Graeme Smith, Andrew Hall and Dewald Pretorius (SA) all made their Test debut.
- Shane Warne (Aus) played his 100th Test match.
- Adam Gilchrist and Shane Warne (Aus) both scored their 2,000th run in Tests.
- Paul Adams (SA) took his 100th wicket in Tests.
- Shane Warne's (Aus) 70 overs bowled in South Africa's second innings was the most by an Australian Test bowler against South Africa.
- Neil McKenzie (SA) became the 13th player to be run out on 99 in Tests.

=== 3rd Test ===
15–19 March 2002
Scorecard

Australia	v	South Africa
315 (74.1 overs); Adam Gilchrist 91 (107); Paul Adams 2/37 (9 overs)		167 (55.2 overs); Herschelle Gibbs 51 (66); Shane Warne 4/33 (13 overs)
186 (49 overs); Steve Waugh 42 (86); Jacques Kallis 3/29 (11 overs)		340/5 (104.5 overs); Herschelle Gibbs 104 (198); Mark Waugh 2/43 (11.5 overs)

South Africa won by 5 wickets
Kingsmead Cricket Ground, Durban
Umpires: Srinivasaraghavan Venkataraghavan (Ind) and Dave Orchard (SA)
Player of the match: Herschelle Gibbs (SA)

- South Africa won the toss and elected to field.
- This was South Africa's highest successful run chase in Tests.

== ODI series ==
=== 1st ODI ===
22 March 2002
10:00
Scorecard

Australia; 223/8 (50 overs)	v	South Africa; 204 (44.4 overs)
Adam Gilchrist 37 (44); Makhaya Ntini 3/24 (10 overs)		Lance Klusener 83 (77); Ian Harvey 3/38 (8 overs)

Australia won by 19 runs
Wanderers Stadium, Johannesburg
Umpires: Ian Howell (SA) and Brian Jerling (SA)
Player of the match: Jason Gillespie (Aus)

- Australia won the toss and elected to bat.
- Nathan Hauritz (Aus) made his ODI debut.

=== 2nd ODI ===
24 March 2002
10:00
Scorecard

Australia; 226/8 (50 overs)	v	South Africa; 181 (46.2 overs)
Jimmy Maher 95 (150); Shaun Pollock 4/32 (10 overs)		Lance Klusener 59 (59); Jason Gillespie 4/43 (9.2 overs)

Australia won by 45 runs
SuperSport Park, Centurion
Umpires: Shaid Wadvalla (SA) and Ian Howell (SA)
Player of the match: Jimmy Maher (Aus)

- South Africa won the toss and elected to field.
- Shane Watson (Aus) made his ODI debut.

=== 3rd ODI ===
27 March 2002
10:00
Scorecard

South Africa; 259/7 (50 overs)	v	Australia; 259/9 (50 overs)
Jonty Rhodes 83 (74); Brett Lee 4/45 (9 overs)		Matthew Hayden 78 (103); Makhaya Ntini 4/33 (10 overs)

Match tied
Senwes Park, Potchefstroom
Umpires: Rudi Koertzen (SA) and Karl Hurter (SA)
Player of the match: Jimmy Maher (Aus)

- South Africa won the toss and elected to bat.
- This was the third tied ODI match between South Africa and Australia.
- Adam Gilchrist (Aus) scored his 4,000th run in ODIs.
- Lance Klusener (SA) scored his 3,000th run in ODIs.
- Damien Martyn (Aus) scored his 2,000th run in ODIs.

=== 4th ODI ===
30 March 2002
10:00
Scorecard

Australia; 290/6 (50 overs)	v	South Africa; 253 (48.1 overs)
Ricky Ponting 129 (126); Shaun Pollock 2/59 (10 overs)		Neil McKenzie 67 (88); Brett Lee 4/63 (9.1 overs)

Australia won by 37 runs
Mangaung Oval, Bloemfontein
Umpires: Muhammed Nanabhay (SA) and Dave Orchard (SA)
Player of the match: Ricky Ponting (Aus)

- Australia won the toss and elected to bat.
- Graeme Smith (SA) made his ODI debut.
- Ricky Ponting's 129 was the highest ODI innings by an Australian against South Africa.

=== 5th ODI ===
3 April 2002
14:30 (D/N)
Scorecard

South Africa; 267/6 (50 overs)	v	Australia; 271/2 (47.5 overs)
Jonty Rhodes 76 (70); Shane Warne 2/44 (10 overs)		Adam Gilchrist 105 (104); Makhaya Ntini 1/51 (9.5 overs)

Australia won by 8 wickets
Kingsmead Cricket Ground, Durban
Umpires: Rudi Koertzen (SA) and Brian Jerling (SA)
Player of the match: Adam Gilchrist (Aus)

- Australia won the toss and elected to field.
- Jon Kent (SA) made his ODI debut.
- Adam Gilchrist and Matthew Hayden's (Aus) 170 was the highest ODI first wicket partnership at Kingsmead Cricket Ground.
- Matthew Hayden scored his 1,000th run in ODIs.
- Jason Gillespie (Aus) took his 50th wicket in ODIs.

=== 6th ODI ===
6 April 2002
10:00
Scorecard

South Africa; 326/3 (50 overs)	v	Australia; 330/7 (49.1 overs)
Graeme Smith 84 (103); Darren Lehmann 1/40 (6 overs)		Ricky Ponting 92 (107); Roger Telemachus 2/48 (10 overs)

Australia won by 3 wickets
St George's Park Cricket Ground, Port Elizabeth
Umpires: Shaid Wadvalla (SA) and Ian Howell (SA)
Player of the match: Adam Gilchrist (Aus)

- South Africa won the toss and elected to bat.
- Jon Kent (SA) played his final ODI match.
- Ricky Ponting (Aus) scored his 5,000th run in ODIs.
- South Africa's 326/3 was the highest ODI innings total against Australia.
- Australia's 330 was the highest successful run chase in ODIs.

=== 7th ODI ===
9 April 2002
14:30 (D/N)
Scorecard

South Africa; 249/7 (39 overs)	v	Australia; 185 (32.3 overs)
Graeme Smith 73 (78); Glenn McGrath 2/43 (7 overs)		Michael Bevan 55 (61); Nicky Boje 5/21 (6.3 overs)

South Africa won by 65 runs (D/L method)
Newlands Cricket Ground, Cape Town
Umpires: Karl Hurter (SA) and Dave Orchard (SA)
Player of the match: Nicky Boje (SA)

- Australia won the toss and elected to field.
- Rain delayed the start of play to 4:25 pm and the match was reduced to 43 overs per side. Further rain prevented play from 4:45 pm to 5:20 pm with the match reduced to 39 overs per side. Australia's revised target was 251 runs.
- Nantie Hayward (SA) played his final ODI match.
- Nicky Boje (SA) took his only five-wicket haul in ODIs.
- Nicky Boje scored his 1,000th run in ODIs.
