= Indian cricket team in Sri Lanka in 1997 =

International cricket tour

	India	Sri Lanka
- Dates: 2 August – 13 August
Captains	Sachin Tendulkar	Arjuna Ranatunga

Test series
- Result: 2-match series drawn 0–0
Most runs	Sachin Tendulkar (290)	Sanath Jayasuriya (571)
Most wickets	Anil Kumble (5)	Muttiah Muralitharan (9)
- Player of the series: Sanath Jayasuriya (SL)

One Day International series
- Results: Sri Lanka won the 4-match series 3–0
Most runs	Mohammad Azharuddin (211)	Aravinda de Silva (212)
Most wickets	Abey Kuruvilla (6)	Sanath Jayasuriya (5)
- Player of the series: Sanath Jayasuriya (SL)

The Indian cricket team toured Sri Lanka in August 1997, participating in two Test matches and three One Day International (ODI) matches. During the first Test match, Sri Lanka scored 952 runs for 6 wickets, the highest team total in Test cricket. Several more records were established in this match, including the highest partnership for the second wicket by Sanath Jayasuriya and Roshan Mahanama. The Test series ended without a result, with both Test matches drawn.

Sri Lanka won all three of the One Day International matches, although the third one had to be replayed due to bad weather. Sanath Jayasuriya was the most notable player during the tournament. He was selected as player of the series in both the Test series and the ODI series, and won two-man of the match awards as well. He was the highest scoring batsman during the Test series, and also took the highest number of wickets for Sri Lanka in the ODI series. His tally of 571 runs was (and as of 2022, remains) the highest total by a batsman in a two-Test series.

== Background ==
The Indian cricket team had arrived in Sri Lanka on 12 July 1997 to participate in the Asia Cup. After that, they stayed on in the country for two Test matches and three One Day International matches with the Sri Lankan cricket team. The Sri Lankans were the world champions, having won the cricket world cup the previous year, and had also won the Asia Cup, having beaten India in the final.

== Tour matches ==
=== 50-over: Sri Lankan Board President's XI v Indians ===
15 August 1997
Scorecard

Sri Lankan Board President's XI; 240/7 (50 overs)	v	Indians; 243/8 (49.3 overs)
Russel Arnold 56; Sourav Ganguly 2/29 (5 overs)		Rahul Dravid 95; N Sadikin 2/38 (7 overs)

Indians won by 2 wickets
De Soysa Stadium, Moratuwa

- Indians won the toss and elected to field.

== Test series ==
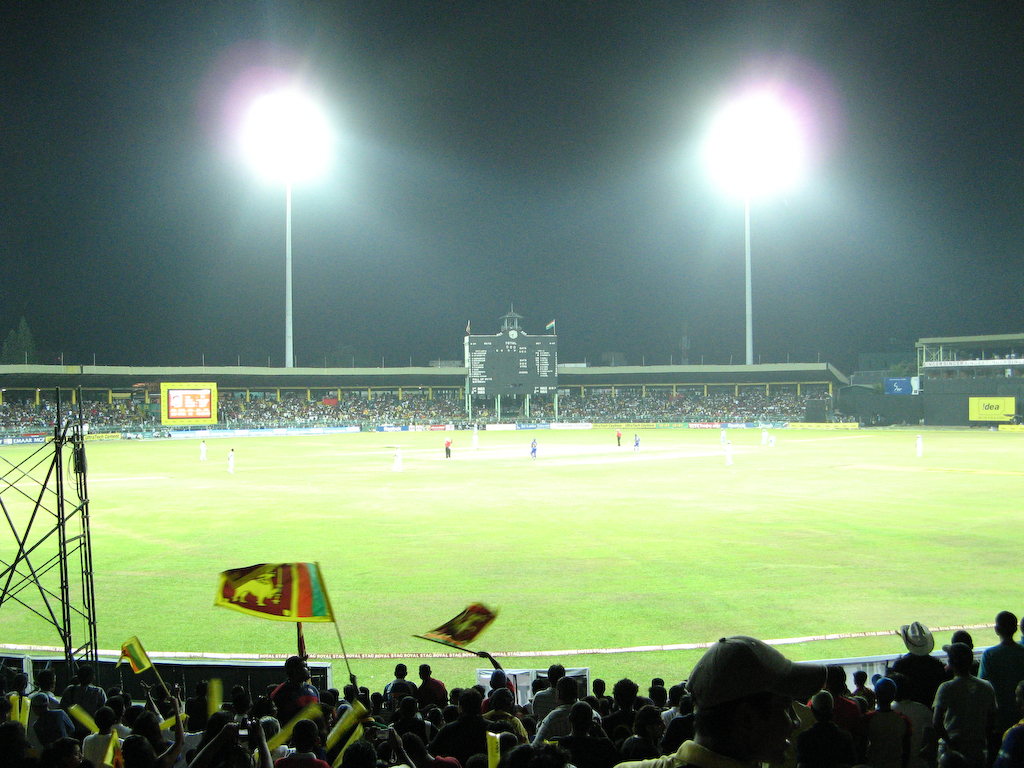
The R. Premadasa Stadium hosted one Test and two ODI matches.

Although only two Test matches had been scheduled for the tour, the Test series turned out to be a significant one in cricketing history. Both were high scoring matches, with the total runs scored in each match exceeding 1,400. Both matches were drawn, but a number of world records were established during the series, particularly in the first match. India played a three-day tour match before the first Test against the Sri Lanka Board President's XI, starting on 29 July. The match ended in a draw, with the Indians scoring 308 runs in their first innings. The President's XI responded with 291, and the Indian team had scored 255 for 5 wickets for their second innings by the end of the match. Sanath Jayasuriya was the highest scorer of the series with 571 runs, while Sachin Tendulkar produced 290 runs for the Indians. Muttiah Muralitharan was the highest wicket taker of the series with 9 wickets, followed by Anil Kumble with 5. Both Tests, as well as the practice match, were held in Colombo. The fact that all the matches of the tour were in Colombo was criticized by the media, and the Indian players and officials were also not happy about it. The cricket board had ruled out other venues reportedly due to bad weather.

=== First Test ===
2–6 August 1997
Scorecard

India	v	Sri Lanka
537/8d (167.3 overs); Sachin Tendulkar 143 (247); Sanath Jayasuriya 3/45 (18 overs)		952/6d (271 overs); Sanath Jayasuriya 340 (578); Sourav Ganguly 2/53 (9 overs)

Match drawn
R. Premadasa Stadium, Colombo
Umpires: K. T. Francis (SL) and Steve Randell (AUS)
Player of the match: Sanath Jayasuriya (SL)

Indian captain Sachin Tendulkar won the toss and decided to bat first. Opener Nayan Mongia got out early with the score on 36. However, Navjot Singh Sidhu and Rahul Dravid took the Indians to 183 before Sidhu was caught behind for 111. Dravid then paired up with Tendulkar, but was dismissed by Sanath Jayasuriya for 69, with the Indian score on 223. Mohammad Azharuddin then joined Tendulkar on the crease, and the two batsmen put together a formidable partnership and had taken India to 280 runs at the end of the day. On the second day, both batsmen had scored centuries and placed India in a strong position. However, the consistent scoring came to a halt with the wicket of Tendulkar, who was caught on 143 with the team total on 451. Sourav Ganguly went for a duck soon after, and wickets began to fall at regular intervals. Azharuddin was dismissed for 126 when India was on 479. Two more wickets fell at 516 and 537, and India declared on 537 runs for 8 wickets.

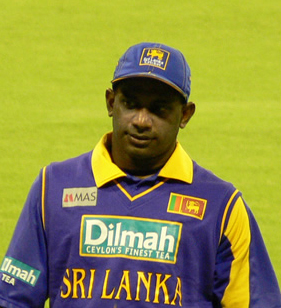
Sanath Jayasuriya made 340, the first triple century by a Sri Lankan batsman.

The Sri Lankan openers Sanath Jayasuriya and Marvan Atapattu went out on to the pitch later in the day. However, Atapattu was caught behind off the very first delivery of debutant Nilesh Kulkarni for 26. At the close of play on the second day, Sri Lanka were on 39/1, with Jayasuriya not out on 12 and Roshan Mahanama on the other end. The pair batted throughout the third day and took Sri Lanka to 322/1. Both had scored centuries, and their partnership was at 283 runs. Jayasuriya and Mahanama continued to bat throughout the fourth day as well, and added 265 more to their partnership, taking Sri Lanka to 587/1. Jayasuriya had scored the first triple century by a Sri Lankan batsman, and was followed by Mahanama with a double hundred. Jayasuriya was 50 runs short of the highest individual Test score (375 by Brian Lara). On the fifth day, a large crowd had gathered at the R. Premadasa Stadium, anticipating a new world record from Jayasuriya. 30,000 were allowed entry free of charge. However, Mahanama was out leg before wicket early in the day for 225 off the bowling of Anil Kumble, when the Sri Lankan score was at 615. Soon after that, Jayasuriya was caught on 340 by Ganguly at silly point off the bowling of Rajesh Chauhan. However, the scoring continued as captain Arjuna Ranatunga paired up with Aravinda de Silva and took the team to 790. When Ranatunga was dismissed for 86, debutant Mahela Jayawardene joined de Silva at the crease. They took their team's total past 903, Jayawardene scored 66 runs before being dismissed with the Sri Lankan total on 921. With the score on 924, de Silva was dismissed as well, and Romesh Kaluwitharana and Chaminda Vaas continued to bat for several more overs. They had taken the total to 952/6 before the innings was declared by the Sri Lankans.

=== Second Test ===
9–13 August 1997
Scorecard

Sri Lanka	v	India
332 (95.4 overs); Aravinda de Silva 146 (226); Debasis Mohanty 4/78 (20.4 overs)		375 (141.1 overs); Sourav Ganguly 147 (312); Muttiah Muralitharan 4/99 (48 overs)
415/7d (98.4 overs); Sanath Jayasuriya 199 (226); Anil Kumble 3/156 (38.4 overs)		281/5 (100 overs); Mohammad Azharuddin 108 (174); Muttiah Muralitharan 3/96 (35 overs)

Match drawn
Sinhalese Sports Club Ground, Colombo
Umpires: B. C. Cooray (SL) & Rudi Koertzen (SA)
Player of the match: Aravinda de Silva (SL)

Sachin Tendulkar once again won the toss, but decided to put the Sri Lankans to bat first. The first Sri Lankan wicket fell on 53, when Sanath Jayasuriya, the high scorer of the first Test, was dismissed by debutant Debasis Mohanty for 32 runs. Marvan Atapattu got out soon after that. Aravinda de Silva joined Roshan Mahanama at the crease and took the Sri Lankans to 121, before Mahanama got out for 37. De Silva continued to bat, although both Arjuna Ranatunga and Mahela Jayawardene were dismissed for 14 and 16 respectively. Romesh Kaluwitharana (6) and Chaminda Vaas (10) also followed, before Muttiah Muralitharan paired up with de Silva at the end of the day to take the team total to 317. De Silva was finally caught behind the next day for 146, and Muralitharan put up ten more runs on the board before he was dismissed, followed by Ravindra Pushpakumara for a duck.

India got off to a bad start in their first innings, losing their first two wickets before the total had even reached 10. Tendulkar and Sidhu put up a 72 run partnership, before India lost the wicket of Sidhu, followed by Mohommad Azharuddin. However, Sourav Ganguly joined Tendulkar at the crease and the two batsmen took the Indian total to 226/4 by the end of the day. Tendulkar scored a century after being dropped by Arjuna Ranatunga, who was injured in the attempt and had to retire. On the third day, Ganguly scored a century as well. However, the batsmen after Tendulkar and Ganguly failed to score well, and the Indians were restricted to 375.

In the Sri Lankans' second innings, Atapattu was dismissed for 29, and the score was at 77/1 at the end of the day. On the fourth day, Mahanama was dismissed for 35 but Jayasuriya, who was then joined by Aravinda de Silva, was heading for another big score. The two batsmen put up a 218 run partnership, a new Sri Lankan record for the third wicket. Jayasuriya became the first batsman to reach 1000 runs that year, and at one stage seemed to be reaching the world record for the fastest double century. However, he was bowled out by Nilesh Kulkarni for 199. De Silva, who had been dropped earlier and bowled by a no ball, ended up with 120, scoring a century in both innings of a match for the second time in his career. The Sri Lankan innings was declared after his wicket fell, with the total at 415/7.

Beginning the Indians' second innings, opener Ajay Jadeja scored 73 runs, but wickets fell at regular intervals at the other end. Sidhu, Tendulkar and Dravid had been dismissed before the total reached 100, and Jadeja was dismissed with the score on 138. However, Mohammad Azharuddin paired up with Ganguly and put up a 110 run stand for the fifth wicket, guiding the Indians out of danger and denying the Sri Lankans the chance of victory. Azharuddin was dropped thrice, and made good use of the chances he got, ending up with an unbeaten 108. The Indians' final score was at 281/5.

== ODI series ==
Three One Day International matches were originally scheduled for the tour, but the third match had to be replayed the following day since it had to be abandoned due to bad weather. As in the Test series, the ODIs were also largely dominated by the batsmen. India played a tour match against the Sri Lankan Board President's XI on 15 August, which they won by 2 wickets. The President's XI had scored 240, and the Indians responded with 243 for 8 wickets in 49.3 overs, with 95 runs coming from Rahul Dravid. The first match created some controversy when the television broadcast showed umpire K. T. Francis wiping the ball on what appeared to be an Indian flag. However, it later turned out to be a bar towel with the same colours.

=== First ODI ===
17 August 1997
Scorecard

Sri Lanka; 302/4 (50 overs)	v	India; 300/7 (50 overs)
Marvan Atapattu 118 (153); Venkatesh Prasad 2/50 (9 overs)		Ajay Jadeja 119 (121); Chaminda Vaas 3/63 (10 overs)

Sri Lanka won by 2 runs
R. Premadasa Stadium, Colombo
Umpires: K. T. Francis (SL) & P. T. Manuel (SL)
Player of the match: Ajay Jadeja (IND)

Tendulkar won the toss and chose to field. The Sri Lankan openers made a partnership of 91 runs in 14 overs, with a quick 73 from Jayasuriya. After he was bowled out, Atapattu and Mahanama took the Sri Lankan score to 199 before Mahanama was dismissed for 53. Aravinda de Silva paired up with Atapattu to take the total to 279, before he was dismissed. Atapattu, who made his maiden century, was run out for 118 and the Sri Lankans ended their innings with a total of 302/4.

The Indian openers made a stand of 58 runs until the dismissal of Sourav Ganguly, but wickets began to fall rapidly after that. The Indian total was at 64/4 at the eleventh over when Ajay Jadeja joined Mohammad Azharuddin at the crease. These two batsmen took the Indians to safety with a record partnership of 232 runs, and took India to 287 before Jadeja was dismissed by Vaas for 119. Both Mongia and Chauhan got out in quick succession, and Azharuddin was left with the task of getting 5 runs off the last delivery of the match. However, he only managed 2, and the Indians ended up with 300 runs, just 3 short of the required target. Azharuddin remained unbeaten on 111.

=== Second ODI ===
20 August 1997
Scorecard

India; 238 (49.3 overs)	v	Sri Lanka; 241/3 (41.5 overs)
Sourav Ganguly 113 (126); Upul Chandana 3/32 (8 overs)		Sanath Jayasuriya 66 (56); Abey Kuruvilla 1/35 (7 overs)

Sri Lanka won by 7 wickets
R. Premadasa Stadium, Colombo
Umpires: BC Cooray (SL) & Nandasena Pathirana (SL)
Player of the match: Sanath Jayasuriya (SL)

The Sri Lankans won the toss and decided to field first, and got an early breakthrough when Tendulkar was dismissed for 6. However, Sourav Ganguly and Robin Singh took the Indians to 105 before Singh was dismissed as the second wicket. Azharuddin and Dravid also got out without scoring much, leaving the Indians at 159/4. Jadeja and Ganguly then built up a partnership and took the total to 218, with Ganguly scoring his maiden century. However, the last six wickets fell within 26 runs, and the final Indian score was at 238.

Jayasuriya and Atapattu made a good partnership again, taking their team to 79. After Atapattu was dismissed for 38, Jayasuriya paired up with Mahanama to take the Sri Lankans to 130, before he was dismissed for 66. Mahanama was run out for 66 when the team total was on 219, but Aravinda de Silva and Upul Chandana guided the Sri Lankan team to victory in 41 overs, the former scoring a half century as well.

=== Third ODI ===
23 August 1997
Scorecard

India; 291/9 (50 overs)	v	Sri Lanka; 132/6 (19 overs)
Robin Singh 100 (102); Aravinda de Silva 3/55 (10 overs)		Sanath Jayasuriya 68 (38); Robin Singh 3/20 (4 overs)

No result
Sinhalese Sports Club Ground, Colombo
Umpires: K. T. Francis (SL) & T. M. Samarasinghe (SL)

- Rain interrupted the match, and Sri Lanka were given a target of 195 in 25 overs. However, the match was stopped after 19 overs due to bad light. A decision was made to replay the match on 24 August.

The Sri Lankans having won the toss and put the Indians to bat, had them in a difficult position early when both their openers were out with the total on 44. However, Robin Singh and Rahul Dravid built up a strong partnership and took their team to a total of 206 runs, before Dravid was out for 78. Singh had just completed his maiden century when he was dismissed. Azharuddin had become the third batsman to pass 7,000 ODI runs before he was dismissed for 34 with the total on 273. The rest of the batsmen scored low, with the last six wickets being taken by the Sri Lankans in 33 balls while conceding 23 runs. The Indians completed their 50 overs with a score of 291/9.

Continuing his good form from the previous matches, Jayasuriya knocked a fast 68 at a strike rate of 178.94. The match was interrupted by rain during the eighth over, and after resuming it with a reduced target of 195 in 25 overs, Jayasuriya and Atapattu were dismissed with the score on 85 and 96 respectively. Ranatunga, Mahanama, and Kalpage all lost their wickets early to Robin Singh in their search for quick runs. Aravinda de Silva attempted to salvage the Sri Lankan innings, before he too was dismissed for 22. The Sri Lankan team were on 132/6 when bad light stopped play at about 6.05 pm after 19 overs, possibly denying India the chance of a win. The match was scheduled to be replayed the following day.

=== Fourth ODI ===
24 August 1997
Scorecard

Sri Lanka; 264 (49.4 overs)	v	India; 255/8 (50 overs)
Aravinda de Silva 104 (117); Abey Kuruvilla 4/43 (8.4 overs)		Mohammad Azharuddin 65 (68); Sajeewa de Silva 2/48 (8 overs)

Sri Lanka won by 9 runs
Sinhalese Sports Club Ground, Colombo
Umpires: K. T. Francis (SL) & T. M. Samarasinghe (SL)
Player of the match: Aravinda de Silva (SL)

The Indians won the toss and chose to field, and immediately got themselves in an advantageous position after dismissing both Sri Lankan openers for 3 runs each. However, an 83 run partnership between Roshan Mahanama and Aravinda de Silva took the Sri Lankans out of danger and onto a score of 105, before Mahanama was bowled out for 50. Ranatunga was quickly dismissed as well, but de Silva put up an 82 run stand with Lanka de Silva who made his maiden half century, and scored 114 runs himself. The Sri Lankans were all out for 264 in the last over.

India started well with a 50 run opening partnership with 39 from Sachin Tendulkar. Robin Singh and Rahul Dravid contributed with 28 and 42 respectively. Mohammad Azharuddin and Ajay Jadeja took the Indians to 221 for 4 wickets, but both were then run out, the former with a score of 65. After that, the Sri Lankan team kept their fielding tight and restricted the Indians to a total of 255 at the end of the allotted 50 overs.
