= English cricket team in Australia in 1974–75 =

International cricket tour

The England national cricket team toured Australia in the 1974–75 season to play a six-match Test series against Australia for The Ashes. The tour was organised by Marylebone Cricket Club (MCC), and the team played its non-international matches as MCC. Australia won the Test series 4–1, and regained The Ashes.

== Test series summary ==
- 1st Test at Brisbane Cricket Ground – Australia won by 166 runs
- 2nd Test at Western Australia Cricket Association Ground – Australia won by 9 wickets
- 3rd Test at Melbourne Cricket Ground – match drawn
- 4th Test at Sydney Cricket Ground – Australia won by 171 runs
- 5th Test at Adelaide Oval – Australia won by 163 runs
- 6th Test at Melbourne Cricket Ground – England won by an innings and 4 runs

== Bibliography ==
- Harte, Chris (1993). A History of Australian Cricket. London: André Deutsch. ISBN 978-02-33988-25-2.
- Preston, Norman, ed. (1976). Wisden Cricketers' Almanack (113th ed.). London: Sporting Handbooks Ltd. ISBN 978-08-50200-50-8.
- Ross, Gordon, ed. (1975). Playfair Cricket Annual (28th ed.). London: Queen Anne Press. ISBN 978-03-62002-26-3.
