= Shaid Wadvalla =

South African cricketer and umpire (born 1949)

Personal information
- Born: 25 July 1949 (age 77); Zeerust, North West, South Africa
- Role: Umpire, Match referee

Umpiring information
- ODIs umpired: 3 (2001–2002)
- Source: ESPNcricinfo, 14 March 2018

Shaid Wadvalla (born 25 July 1949) is a former South African cricketer and umpire. He stood in three ODI games between 2001 and 2002. In January 2020, he was named as one of the three match referees for the 2020 Under-19 Cricket World Cup tournament in South Africa.

== See also ==
- List of One Day International cricket umpires
