= Cricket in New Zealand =

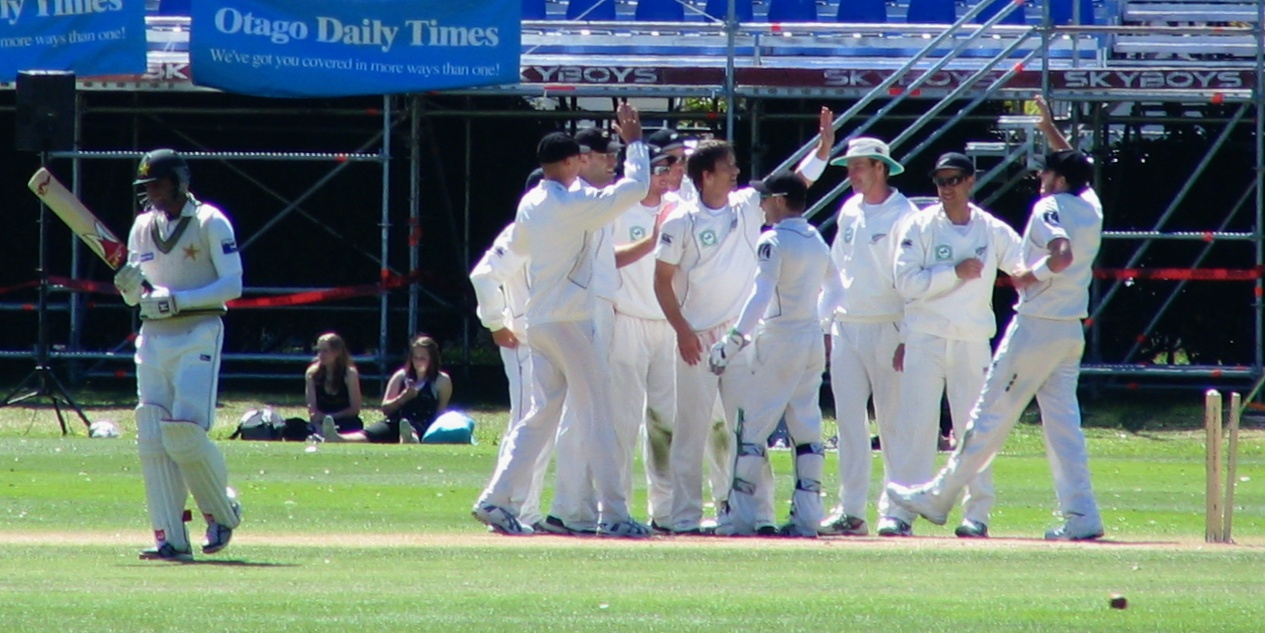
- Country: New Zealand
- Governing body: New Zealand Cricket
- National teams: New Zealand Men; New Zealand Women; New Zealand U-19 Men; New Zealand U-19 Women; New Zealand A Men
- Nickname: Black Caps
- First played: 1832
- Registered players: 148,215 (2013–14); 170,000+ (2015–16)

National competitions
- List: First Class Cricket; Plunket Shield; Non-First Class Cricket; Hawke Cup; List A Cricket; The Ford Trophy; Hallyburton Johnstone Shield; T20 Cricket; Men's Super Smash; Women's Super Smash

International competitions
- List: Men’s national team; ICC World Test Championship: Champions (2019-2021); Cricket World Cup: Runners-up (2015, 2019); ICC Men's T20 World Cup: Runners-up (2021); ICC Champions Trophy: Champions (2000); Commonwealth Games: Bronze Medal (1998); Men’s U-19 national team; Under-19 Cricket World Cup: Runners-up (1998); Women's national team; Women's Cricket World Cup: Champions(2000); ICC Women's World Twenty20: Champions (2024); Commonwealth Games: Bronze Medal (2022); Women's U-19 national team; Under-19 Women's T20 World Cup: Semi-final (2023)

Cricket is the most popular summer sport in New Zealand, second only in total sporting popularity to rugby. New Zealand is one of the twelve countries that take part in Test match cricket.

== History ==
=== The beginnings of cricket in New Zealand ===
The Reverend Henry Williams provided history with the first report of a game of cricket in New Zealand when he wrote in his diary in December 1832 about boys in and around Paihia on Horotutu Beach playing cricket. In 1835, Charles Darwin and HMS Beagle called into the Bay of Islands on its circumnavigation of the Earth. Darwin witnessed a game of cricket played by freed Māori slaves and the son of a missionary at Waimate North. Darwin in The Voyage of the Beagle wrote:

several young men redeemed by the missionaires from slavery were employed on the farm. In the evening I saw a party of them at cricket.

The first recorded game of cricket in New Zealand took place in Wellington in December 1842. The Wellington Spectator reports a game on 28 December 1842 played by a "Red" team and a "Blue" team from the Wellington Club. The first fully recorded match was reported by the Examiner in Nelson between the Surveyors and Nelson in March 1844.

The first team to tour New Zealand was Parr's all England XI in 1863–64. Between 1864 and 1914, 22 foreign teams toured New Zealand. England sent six teams, Australia 15 and Fiji one.

=== First national team ===
The first team representing New Zealand on a national level played on 15–17 February 1894. The match was played against New South Wales at Lancaster Park in Christchurch. New South Wales won by 160 runs. New South Wales returned again in 1895–96 and New Zealand won the solitary game by 142 runs, its first victory. The New Zealand Cricket Council was formed towards the end of 1894.

New Zealand played its first two internationals (non Test matches) in 1904–05 against a star-studded Australia team containing such players as Victor Trumper, Warwick Armstrong and Clem Hill. Rain saved New Zealand from a thrashing in the first match but not the second which New Zealand lost by an innings and 358 runs – currently the second largest defeat in New Zealand first-class cricket.

=== Inter-war period ===
In 1927 New Zealand toured England. They played 26 first class matches, mostly against county sides. They managed to beat Worcestershire, Glamorgan, Somerset, and Derbyshire. On the strength of the performances on this tour New Zealand was granted Test status.

In 1929 to 1930 the M.C.C toured New Zealand and played four Tests all of three days in duration. New Zealand lost its first Test match but drew the next three. In the second Test Stewie Dempster and Jackie Mills put on 276 for the first wicket. This is still the highest partnership for New Zealand against England.

New Zealand first played South Africa in 1931–1932 but were unable to secure Test matches against any teams other than England before World War II ended all Test cricket for seven years. New Zealand's first Test after the war was against Australia in 1945–1946. This game was not considered a "Test" at the time but it was granted Test status retrospectively by the International Cricket Council in March 1948. The New Zealand players who appeared in this match probably did not appreciate this move by the ICC as New Zealand were dismissed for 42 and 54. A dispute between the New Zealand Cricket Council and Australian players over touring allowances meant that this was the only Test Australia played against New Zealand between 1929 and 1972.

=== Cricket after World War II ===
In 1949 New Zealand sent one of its best ever sides to England. It contained Bert Sutcliffe, Martin Donnelly, John R. Reid and Jack Cowie. However, three-day Test matches ensured that all four Tests were drawn.

New Zealand played its first matches against the West Indies in 1951–1952, and Pakistan and India in 1955–1956.

In 1954–1955 New Zealand recorded the lowest ever innings total, 26 against England. The following season New Zealand achieved its first Test victory. The first three Tests of a four Test series were won by the West Indies but New Zealand won the fourth to notch up its first Test victory. It had taken them 45 matches and 26 years. In the next 20 years New Zealand won only 7 more Tests. For most of this period New Zealand bowling attack lacked a leading performer of the highest caliber, though the team had two highly regarded batsmen in Glenn Turner and Bert Sutcliffe and a widely recognised all-rounder in John R. Reid.

=== 1970–1971 to 2000 ===
The 1973 Richard Hadlee debut marked a turning point in New Zealand's Test record. Hadlee was recognised as one of the best pace bowlers of his generation and played 86 Tests for New Zealand before he retired in 1990. Of the 86 Tests that Hadlee played in New Zealand, he won 22 and lost 28. In 1977–78 New Zealand won its first Test against England, at the 48th attempt. Hadlee took 10 wickets in the match.

During the 1980s New Zealand also had the services of one of its batsmen, Martin Crowe and a number of players such as John Wright, Bruce Edgar, John F. Reid, Andrew Jones, Geoff Howarth, Jeremy Coney, Ian Smith, John Bracewell, Lance Cairns, Stephen Boock, and Ewen Chatfield, who were capable of playing the occasional match winning performance and consistently making a contribution to a Test match.

The best example of New Zealand's two star players (R. Hadlee and M. Crowe) putting in match winning performances and other players making good contributions is New Zealand vs. Australia, 1985 at Brisbane. In Australia's first innings Hadlee took 9–52. In New Zealand's only innings, M Crowe scored 188 and John F. Reid 108. Edgar, Wright, Coney, Jeff Crowe, V. Brown, and Hadlee scored between 17 and 54*. In Australia's second innings, Hadlee took 6–71 and Chatfield 3–75. New Zealand won by an innings and 41 runs.

One-day cricket also gave New Zealand a chance to compete more regularly than Test cricket with the sides in world cricket. In one-day cricket a batsman doesn't need to score centuries to win games for his side and bowlers don't need to bowl the opposition out. One-day games can be won by one batsman getting a 50, a few others getting 30s, bowlers bowling economically and everyone fielding. These were requirements New Zealand players could consistently meet and thus developed an appropriate one-day record against all sides.

Perhaps New Zealand's most famous one-day match was the controversial "Under arm" match against Australia at the MCG in 1981. Requiring six runs to tie the match off the final ball, Australian captain Greg Chappell instructed his brother Trevor to "bowl" the ball underarm along the wicket to prevent the New Zealand batsman from hitting a six. The Australian umpires ruled the move as legal, remaining to this day one of cricket's most controversial calls.

When New Zealand next played in the tri-series in Australia in 1983, Lance Cairns became a crowd favourite for his one-day batting. In one match against Australia, he hit six sixes at the MCG, one of the world's largest grounds, though New Zealand lost this game by 149 runs.

=== Into the 21st Century ===
Chris Cairns, son of Lance Cairns, made his debut one year before Hadlee retired in 1990. Cairns led the 1990s bowling attack with Danny Morrison. Stephen Fleming, led the batting and the team into the 21st century. Nathan Astle and Craig McMillan also contributed for New Zealand, but both retired earlier than expected.

Daniel Vettori made his debut as an 18-year-old in 1997. When he took over from Fleming as captain in 2007 he was regarded as the best spinning allrounder in world cricket. On 26 August 2009, Daniel Vettori became the eighth player and second left-arm bowler (after Chaminda Vaas) in history to take 300 wickets and score 3000 test runs, joining the illustrious club. Vettori decided to take an indefinite break from international short form cricket in 2011 but will continue to represent New Zealand in Test cricket.

Shane Bond played 17 Tests for NZ between 2001 and 2007 but missed far more through injury. When fit, he added a dimension to the New Zealand bowling attack that had been missing since Hadlee retired.

The rise of the financial power of the Board of Control for Cricket in India had an immense effect on New Zealand cricket and its players. The BCCI managed to convince other boards not to pick players who had joined the rival Twenty-20 Indian Cricket League. New Zealand Cricket lost the services of Shane Bond, Lou Vincent, Andre Adams, Hamish Marshall and Daryl Tuffey. The money to be made from Twenty-20 cricket in India may have also induced players, such as Craig McMillan and Scott Styris (from Test cricket) to retire earlier than they would have otherwise. Bond and Tuffey eventually returned to play for New Zealand.

== Administration ==
New Zealand Cricket, formerly the New Zealand Cricket Board, is the governing body for professional cricket in New Zealand. Cricket is the most popular and highest profile summer sport in New Zealand.

== National team ==
National teams of New Zealand
- New Zealand (Men's): New Zealand (Women's)
- New Zealand U-19 (Men's): New Zealand U-19 (Women's)

New Zealand A Men

The New Zealand national cricket team is governed by the New Zealand Cricket (NZC) and is a member of the East Asia-Pacific. Since 1926, the NZC has been affiliated with ICC, the international governing body for world cricket.

=== Performance ===
The following list includes the performance of all of New Zealand's national teams at major competitions.

==== Men's senior team ====
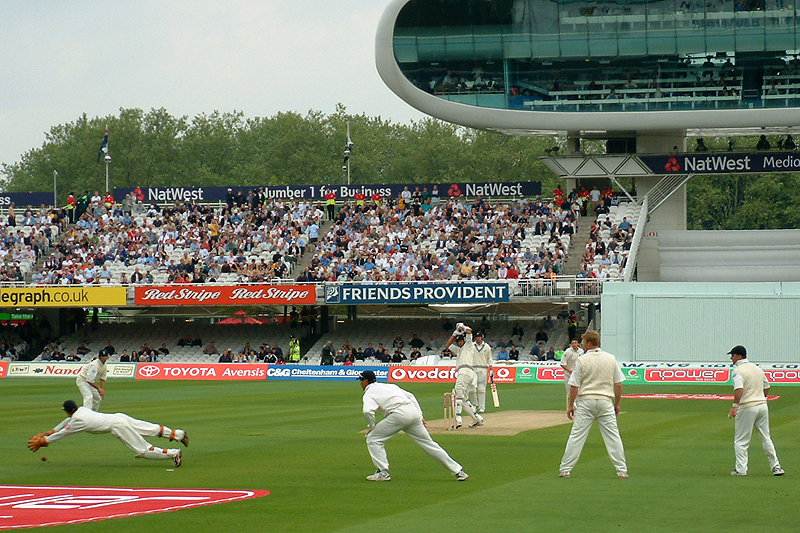
England's Steve Harmison bowling against New Zealand at Lord's.

New Zealand was the inaugural winner of the ICC World Test Championship title. New Zealand lifted the 'Mace' in 2021 defeating India by 8 wickets in the final played at Rose bowl cricket ground in Southam-pton. In the same year New Zealand ended up as the runner up of ICC World Twenty20 Cricket World Cup.

Historically, the national cricket team has not been as successful as the national rugby union team. New Zealand played its first test in 1930 but had to wait until 1956 to win its first test. The national team began to have more success in the 1970s and 1980s. New Zealand's most famous cricketer, the fast bowler Richard Hadlee who was the first bowler to take 400 wickets in test cricket, played in this era.

Tournament	Appearance in finals	Last appearance	Best performance
ICC Men's Cricket World Cup	2 out of 13	2023	Runners-up (2015, 2019)
ICC Men's T20 World Cup	1 out of 9	2024	Runners-up (2021)
ICC Champions Trophy	3 out of 8	2025	Champions (2000)
ICC World Test Championship	1 out of 3	2023–25	Champions (2019-2021)
Commonwealth Games	0 out of 1	1998	Bronze Medal (1998)

==== Women's senior team ====
The New Zealand women's cricket team played their first Test match in 1935, when they lost to England. Since then they have only won two Tests, once against Australia, and once against South Africa.

Their greatest success in one-day cricket was when they won the 2000 World Cup under captain Emily Drumm. In a hotly contested final, they scored 184 to narrowly beat Australia by four runs, Australia being all out for 180.

Tournament	Appearance in finals	Last appearance	Best performance
ICC Women's Cricket World Cup	4 out of 12	2022	Champions(2000)
ICC Women's T20 World Cup	3 out of 9	2024	Champions (2024)
Commonwealth Games	0 out of 1	2022	Bronze Medal (2022)

==== Men's U-19 team ====
Tournament	Appearance in finals	Last appearance	Best performance
ICC Under-19 Cricket World Cup	1 out of 15	2024	Runners-up (1998)

==== Women's U-19 team ====
Tournament	Appearance in finals	Last appearance	Best performance
Under-19 Women's T20 World Cup	0 out of 1	2023	Semi-final (2023)

== Organisation of cricket in modern New Zealand ==
=== International cricket ===
International cricket in New Zealand generally follow a fixed pattern. For example, the English schedule under which the nation tours other countries during the winter and plays at home during the summer. Generally, there has recently been a tendency to play more one-day matches than Test matches. Cricket in New Zealand is managed by the New Zealand Cricket (NZC).

==== Men's National Team ====
The New Zealand National Cricket Team represents New Zealand in international cricket matches.

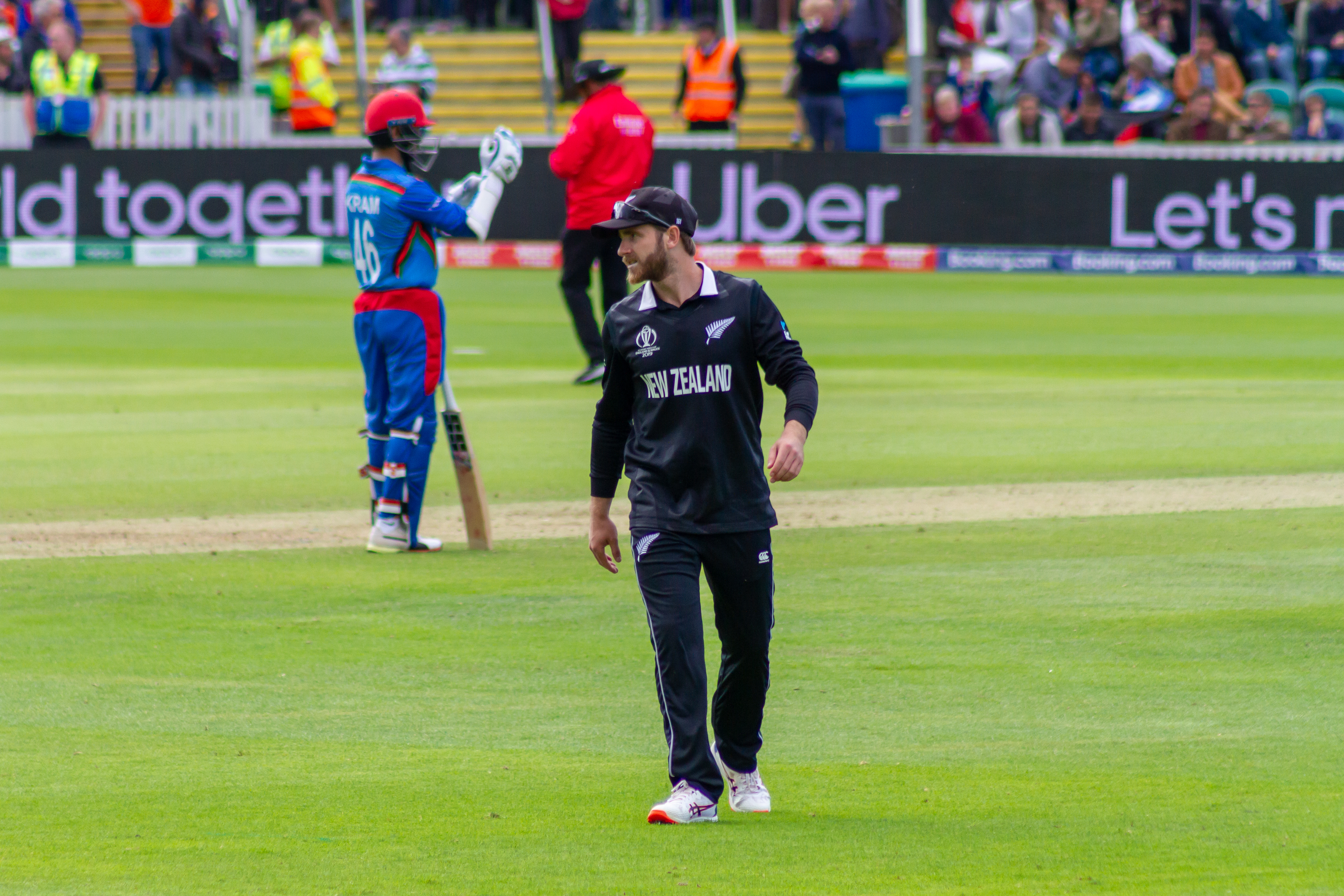
Kane Williamson in Cricket World Cup 2019

New Zealand have been participating in international cricket since 1930 and competed in international tournament since the first ever the 1975 Cricket World Cup. The New Zealand national cricket team has also provided some of the greatest players to the world, the biggest example of which is Sir Richard Hadlee. New Zealand cricket has a rich history. The New Zealand men's national team is currently ranked No. 3 in Tests, No. 2 in ODIs and at 4th position in T20Is. New Zealand won their first ever ICC tournament, ICC World Test Championship cups in 2021 under the captaincy of Kane Williamson.

- Test International- On 15 January 1930, an Kiwis representative team played England as the first Test match at the Lancaster Park. They are the most successful Test cricketing nation, with a higher percentage of won matches than any other nation. In Test cricket, the Kiwis team compete for various trophies and championships. The ICC Test Championship is an international competition run by the ICC for the 10 teams that play Test cricket. The competition is notional in the sense that it is simply a ranking scheme overlaid on all international matches that are otherwise played as part of regular Test cricket with no other consideration whatsoever.
- One Day International- The kiwis team took part in the first one day international on 11 February 1973 against Pakistan at the same Lancaster Park. Since then, the team has maintained a good record in one day internationals. New Zealand and Australia co-hosted the 1992 Cricket World Cup, and the 2015 Cricket World Cup. The 2015 Cricket World Cup was the 11th Cricket World Cup, jointly hosted by New Zealand and Australia from 14 February to 29 March 2015. Fourteen teams played 49 matches in 14 venues, with Australia staging 23 games at grounds in Auckland, Christchurch, Dunedin, Hamilton, Napier, Nelson and Wellington. The final match of the tournament took place at the Melbourne Cricket Ground between co-hosts New Zealand and Australia in front of a record crowd of 93,013.
- T20 International- New Zealand played their first T2O International on 17 February 2005 against New Zealand. In November 2021, New Zealand almost won their first-ever ICC Men's T20 World Cup held in United Arab Emirates, but felt short against Australia.

==== Women's National Team ====
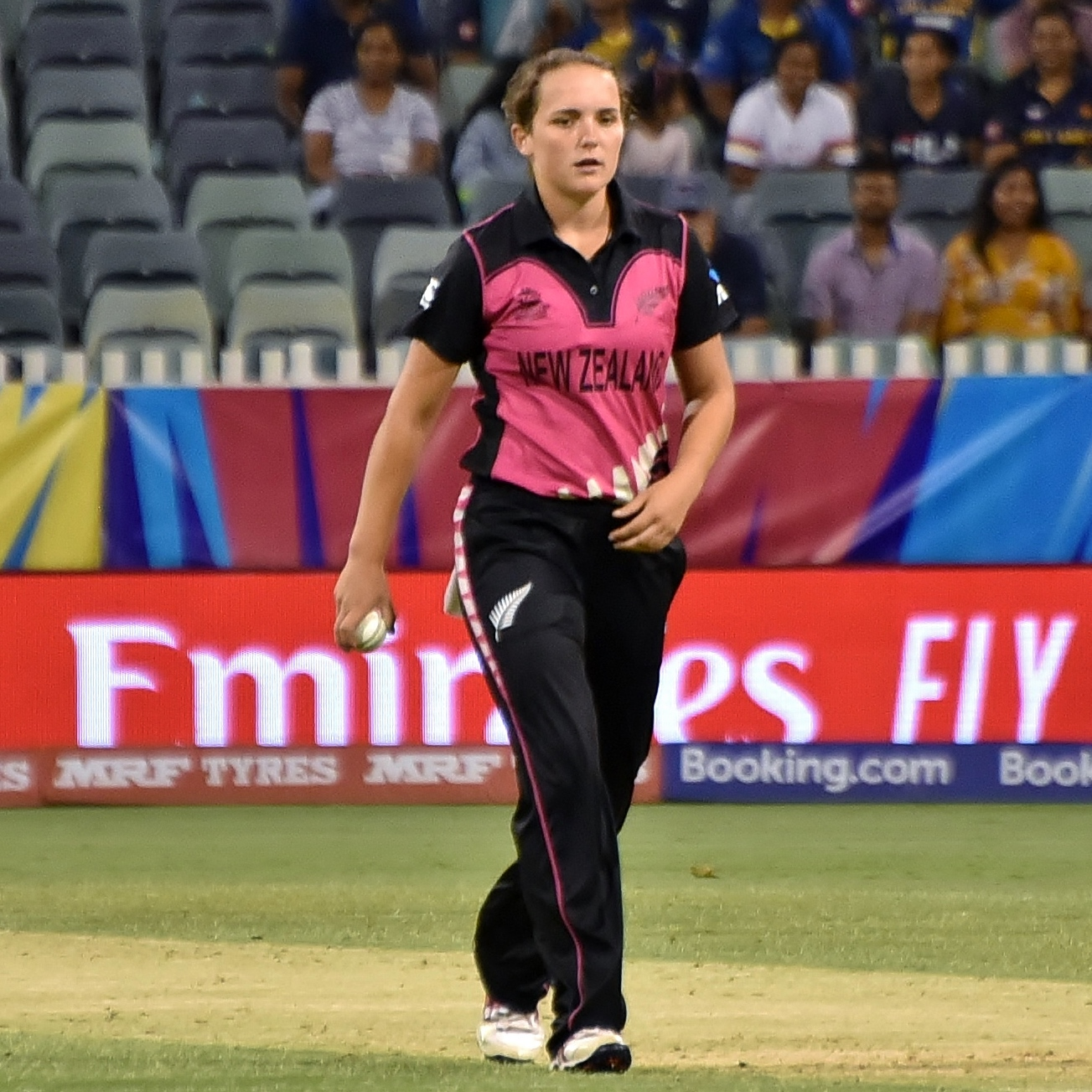
Amelia Kerr was awarded with the player of the match award in the final of 2024 Women's T20 World Cup

The New Zealand national women's cricket team represents New Zealand in international women's cricket matches. The New Zealand national women's cricket team competes internationally and has won the Women's Cricket World Cup one time. The New Zealand team also compete in the Rose Bowl series, a series of one-day internationals against Australia. The New Zealand women's national team is currently ranked No. 5 in ODIs and at No. 4 in T20Is.

- Test International - New Zealand made their debut as a Test playing nation in 1935 against England. In past time, New Zealand women's rarely play test. But in recent years they are playing more test matches.
- One Day International - New Zealand played their first ODI in 1973 against Trinidad and Tobago and competed in international tournament since the first ever the 1973 Women's Cricket World Cup. They have clinched their first ever Women's Cricket World Cup title in 2000.
- T20 International - New Zealand played their first T20 International in 2004 against England. New Zealand Women's have made great impact in T20 international from their early day of this format. They have clinched their first ever ICC Women's T20 World Cup in 2024 by huge marign of 32 runs against South Africa.

=== Domestic Cricket ===
==== Men's Domestic Cricket ====
===== First class competitions =====
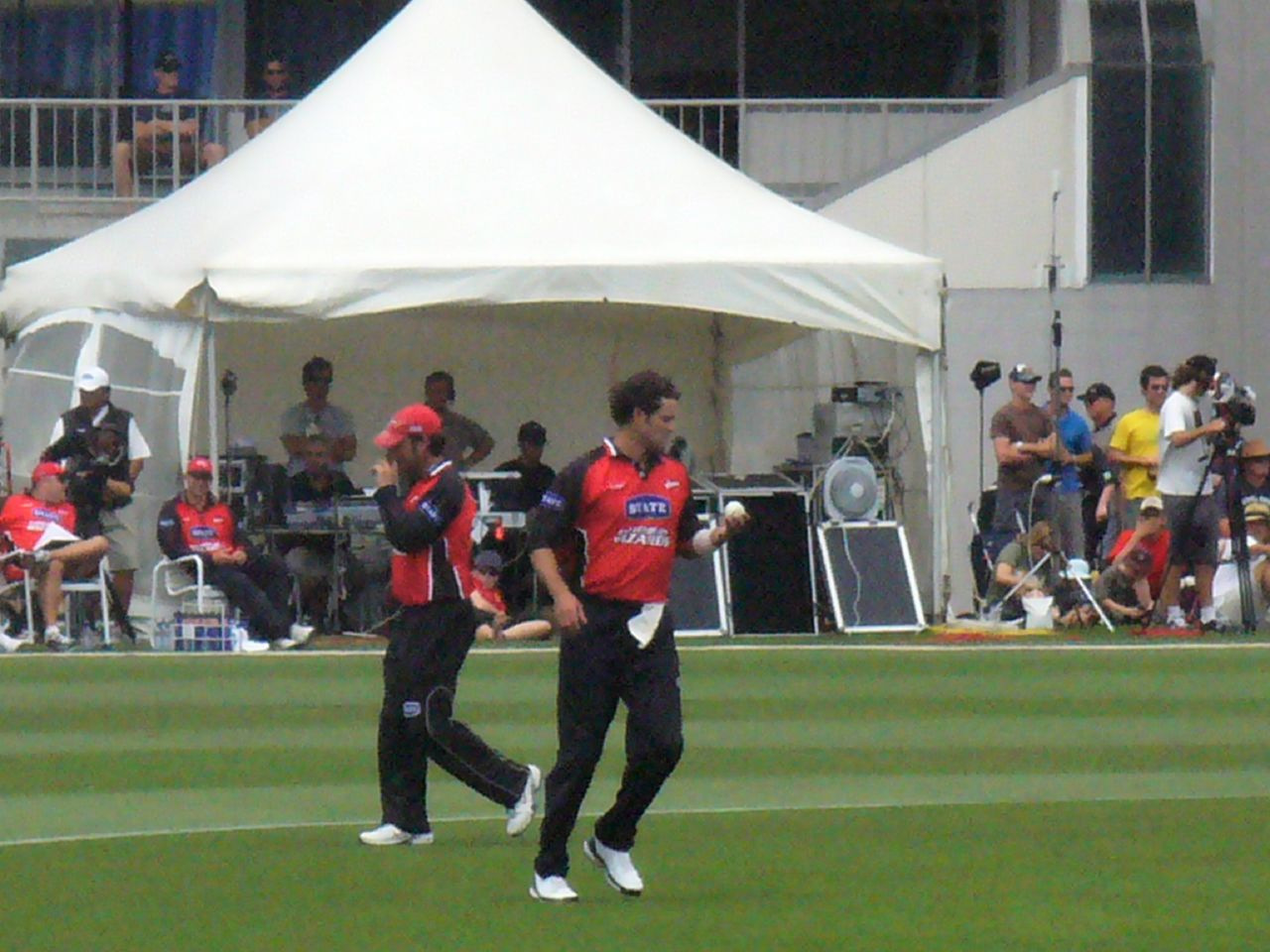
Chris Cairns starts a run-up at Eden Park in 2006

- Plunket Shield

===== Limited overs competitions =====
- Ford Trophy

===== Twenty20 competitions =====
- Super Smash

===== Youth competitions =====
- Men's Under-19 Tournament
- Men's Under-17 Tournament

==== Women's Domestic Cricket ====
===== Limited overs competitions =====
- Hallyburton Johnstone Shield

===== Twenty20 competitions =====
- Women's Super Smash

===== Youth competitions =====
- Women's Under-19 Tournament

== Stadiums ==
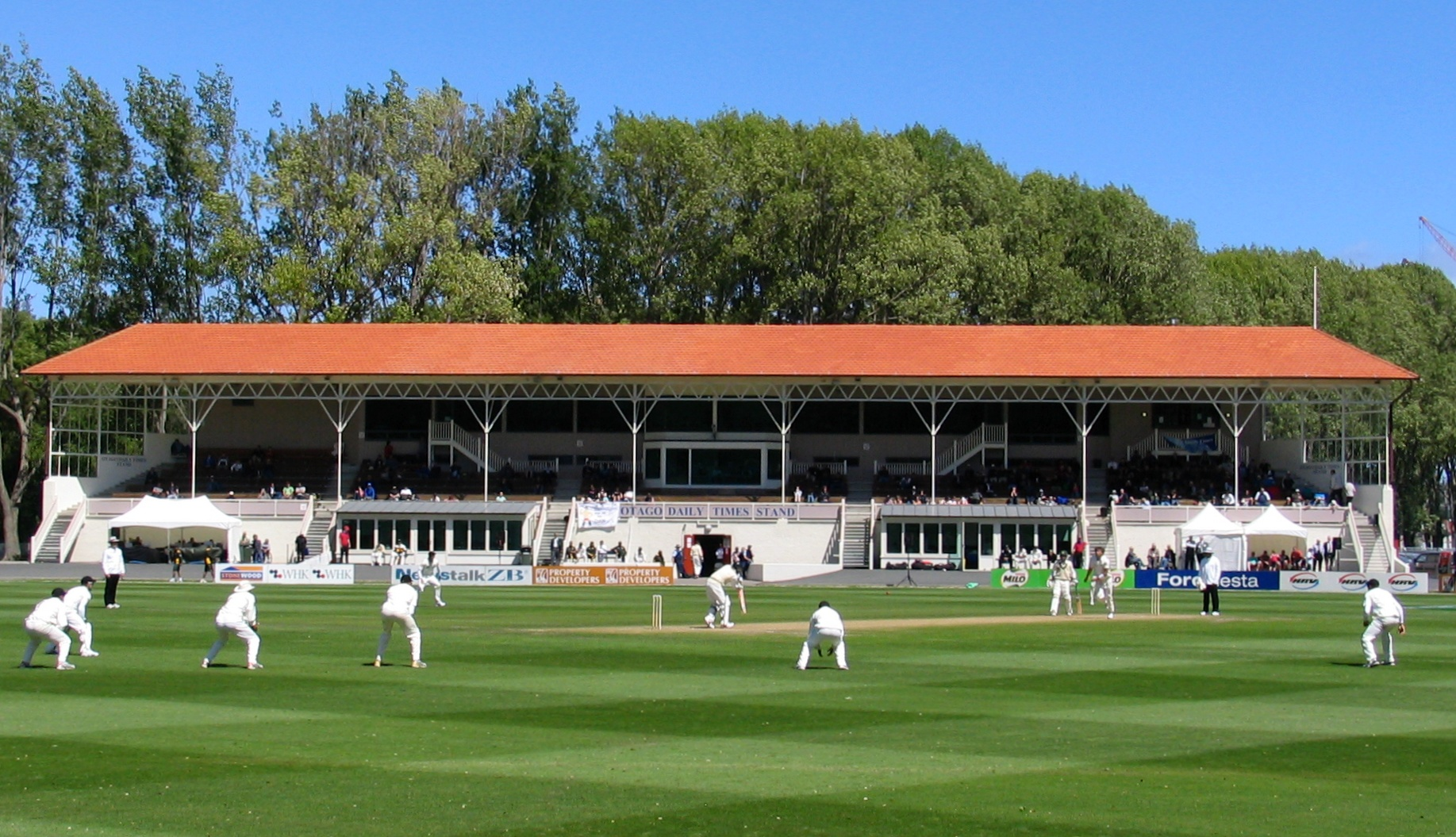
New Zealand vs Pakistan, University Oval, Dunedin

There are numerous club grounds throughout New Zealand. Over 70 grounds have been used for First-class, List A and Twenty20 cricket matches.

The 16 grounds that have hosted men's international cricket games are listed in the table below.

Ground Name	Location	Region	First Used	Last Used	Tests	ODIs	T20Is
Lancaster Park	Christchurch	Canterbury	1929/30	2010/11	40	48	4
Basin Reserve	Wellington	Wellington	1929/30	2020/21	65	30	0
Eden Park	Auckland	Auckland	1929/30	2020/21	50	77	24
Carisbrook	Dunedin	Otago	1954/55	2003/04	10	21	0
McLean Park	Napier	Hawke's Bay	1978/79	2020/21	10	44	4
Seddon Park	Hamilton	Waikato	1980/81	2020/21	27	35	12
Pukekura Park	New Plymouth	Taranaki	1991/92	1991/92	0	1	0
Owen Delany Park	Taupō	Waikato	1998/99	2000/01	0	3	0
Wellington Regional Stadium	Wellington	Wellington	1999/2000	2020/21	0	31	15
Queenstown Events Centre	Queenstown	Otago	2002/03	2013/14	0	9	0
University Oval	Dunedin	Otago	2007/08	2020/21	8	11	2
Cobham Oval (New)	Whangārei	Northland	2011/12	2017/18	0	2	0
Saxton Oval	Nelson	Nelson	2013/14	2019/20	0	11	2
Hagley Oval	Christchurch	Canterbury	2013/14	2020/21	8	15	2
Bert Sutcliffe Oval	Lincoln	Canterbury	2013/14	2013/14	0	2	0
Bay Oval	Mount Maunganui	Bay of Plenty	2013/14	2020/21	2	10	9

As of 29 December 2021.

== International competitions hosted ==
Competition	Edition	Winner	Final	Runners-up	New Zealand's position	Venues	Final venue	Stadium
Men's senior competitions
ICC Men's Cricket World Cup	1992 Cricket World Cup	Pakistan	249/6 (50 overs) – 227 (49.2 overs)	England	Semi-finals	18 (in 2 countries)	Melbourne Cricket Ground	
Under-19 Men's Cricket World Cup	2002 Under-19 Cricket World Cup	Australia	206/9 (50 overs) – 209/3 (45.1 overs)	South Africa	Super League	9 (in 6 cities)	Bert Sutcliffe Oval	
Under-19 Men's Cricket World Cup	2010 Under-19 Cricket World Cup	Australia	207/9 (50 overs) – 182 (46.4 overs)	Pakistan	Quarter-finals	9 (in 4 cities)	Bert Sutcliffe Oval	
ICC Men's Cricket World Cup	2015 Cricket World Cup	Australia	183 (45 overs) – 186/3 (33.1 overs)	New Zealand	Runners-up	14 (in 2 countries)	Melbourne Cricket Ground	
Under-19 Men's Cricket World Cup	2018 Under-19 Cricket World Cup	India	216 (47.2 overs)– 220/2 (38.5 overs)	Australia	Quarter-finals	7 (in 6 cities)	Bay Oval	
Women's senior competitions
ICC Women's Cricket World Cup	1982 Women's Cricket World Cup	Australia	151/5 (60 overs) – 152/7 (59 overs)	England	Semi-finals	15 (in 12 cities)	Lancaster Park	
ICC Women's Cricket World Cup	2000 Women's Cricket World Cup	New Zealand	184 (48.4 overs) – 180 (49.1 overs)	Australia	Champions	3 (in 2 cities)	Bert Sutcliffe Oval	
ICC Women's Cricket World Cup	2022 Women's Cricket World Cup	Australia	356/5 (50 overs) – 285 (43.4 overs)	England	Group Stage	6 (in 6 cities)	Hagley Oval	

== Performance in international competitions ==
A red box around the year indicates tournaments played within New Zealand

Key
Champions
Runners-up
Semi-finals

=== Men's team ===
==== ICC World Test Championship ====
World Test Championship record
Year	League stage										Final Host	Final	Final Position
Year	Pos	Matches					Ded	PC	Pts	PCT	Final Host	Final	Final Position
Year	Pos	P	W	L	D	T	Ded	PC	Pts	PCT	Final Host	Final	Final Position
2019–2021	2/9	11	7	4	0	0	0	600	420	70.2	Rose Bowl, England	Won by 8 wickets against India	Champions
2021–2023	6/9	13	4	6	3	0	0	156	60	38.46	-	-	-
2021–2023	4/9	14	7	7	0	0	3	168	81	48.21	-	-	-
Total (including finals)	1 Title	39	18	17	3	0	-	-	-	-	-	-	-

==== ICC Cricket World Cup ====
ICC Cricket World Cup record
Host(s) & Year	First Round							Second Round							Semi Final	Final	Position
Host(s) & Year	Pos	P	W	L	T	NR	Pts	Pos	P	W	L	T/NR	PCF	Pts	Semi Final	Final	Position
(England) 1975	2/4	3	2	1	0	0	4	—N/a							Lost to (Cricket West Indies) WI by 5 wickets	Did not qualify	4/8
(England) 1979	2/4	3	2	1	0	0	8	—N/a							Lost to (England) ENG by 9 runs	Did not qualify	4/8
(England) (Wales) 1983	3/4	6	3	3	0	0	6	—N/a							Did not qualify		5/8
(India) (Pakistan) 1987	3/4	6	2	4	0	0	8	—N/a							Did not qualify		6/8
(Australia) (New Zealand) 1992	1/9	8	7	1	0	0	14	—N/a							Lost to (Pakistan) PAK by 4 wickets	Did not qualify	3/9
(India) (Pakistan) (Sri Lanka) 1996	3/6	5	3	2	0	0	6	Lost to (Australia) AUS by 6 wickets							Did not qualify		7/12
(England) (Wales) (Scotland) (Republic of Ireland) (Netherlands) 1999	3/6	5	3	2	0	0	6	4/6	3	1	1	0/1	2	5	Lost to (Pakistan) PAK by 9 wickets	Did not qualify	4/12
(South Africa) 2003	3/7	6	4	2	0	0	16	5/6	3	1	2	0	4	8	Did not qualify		5/14
(Cricket West Indies) 2007	1/4	3	3	0	0	0	6	3/8	6	4	2	0	2	10	Lost to (Sri Lanka) SL by 81 runs	Did not qualify	3/16
(India) (Sri Lanka) (Bangladesh) 2011	4/7	6	4	2	0	0	8	Beat (South Africa) SA by 49 runs							Lost to (Sri Lanka) SL by 5 wickets	Did not qualify	4/14
(Australia) (New Zealand) 2015	1/6	6	6	0	0	0	12	Beat (Cricket West Indies) WI by 143 runs							Beat (South Africa) SA by 4 wickets (DLS)	Lost to (Australia) AUS by 7 wickets	2/14
(England) (Wales) 2019	4/10	9	5	3	0	1	11	—N/a							Beat (India) IND by 18 runs	Lost to (England) ENG by 9 boundaries	2/10
(India) 2023	4/10	9	5	4	0	0	10	—N/a							Lost to (India) IND by 70 runs	Did not qualify	4/10
(South Africa) (Zimbabwe) (Namibia) 2027	TBD																
(India) (Bangladesh) 2031	TBD																

==== ICC T20 World Cup ====
Year	Round	Position	GP	W	L	T+W	T+L	NR	Ab (Note: Abandoned matches are not counted in the official records.)	Captain
(South Africa) 2007	Semi-final	4/12	6	3	3	0	0	0	0	Daniel Vettori
(England) 2009	Super 8	5/12	5	2	3	0	0	0	0	Daniel Vettori
(Cricket West Indies) 2010	Super 8	5/12	5	3	2	0	0	0	0	Daniel Vettori
(Sri Lanka) 2012	Super 8	7/12	5	1	2	0	2	0	0	Ross Taylor
(Bangladesh) 2014	Super 10	6/16	4	2	2	0	0	0	0	Brendon McCullum
(India) 2016	Semi-final	3/16	5	4	1	0	0	0	0	Kane Williamson
(United Arab Emirates) (Oman) 2021	Runners-up	2/16	7	5	2	0	0	0	0	Kane Williamson
(Australia) 2022	Semi-final	4/16	5	3	2	0	0	0	1	Kane Williamson
(Cricket West Indies) (United States) 2024	Group stage	10/20	4	2	2	0	0	0	0	Kane Williamson
(India) (Sri Lanka) 2026	Qualified									
Total	0 titles	9/9	47	25	19	0	2	0	1	—N/a

==== ICC Champions Trophy ====
ICC Champions Trophy record
Host(s) & Year	Group stage								Semi Final	Final	Stage
Host(s) & Year	Pos	P	W	L	T	NR	NRR	Pts	Semi Final	Final	Stage
(Sri Lanka) 2002	3/3	2	1	1	0	0	0.030	2	Did not qualify		Group
(England) 2004	2/3	2	1	1	0	0	1.603	2	Did not qualify		Group
(India) 2006	2/4	3	2	1	0	0	0.572	4	Lost to Australia by 34 runs	Did not qualify	Semi Final
(South Africa) 2009	1/4	3	2	1	0	0	0.782	4	Beat Pakistan by 5 wickets	Lost to Australia by 6 wickets	Runners-up
(England) 2013	3/4	3	1	1	0	1	0.777	3	Did not qualify		Group
(England) (Wales) 2017	4/4	3	0	2	0	1	−1.058	1	Did not qualify		Group
(Pakistan) (United Arab Emirates) 2025	Qualified										

ICC KnockOut Trophy record
Host(s) & Year	Pre-Quarter finals	Quarter-finals	Semi-finals	Final	Stage
(Bangladesh) 1998	Beat Zimbabwe by 5 wickets	Lost to Sri Lanka by 5 wickets	Did not qualify		Quarter Final
(Kenya) 2000	Bye	Beat Zimbabwe by 64 runs	Beat Pakistan by 4 wickets	Beat India by 4 wickets	Winners

==== Commonwealth Games ====
Commonwealth Games record
Year	Round	Position	P	W	L	T	NR
(Malaysia) 1998	Bronze Medal	3/16	5	4	1	0	0
Total	0 Title	-	5	4	1	0	0

=== Women's team ===
==== ICC Women's Cricket World Cup ====
World Cup record
Year	Round	GP	W	L	T	NR
(England) 1973	Third place	6	3	2	0	1
(India) 1978	Third place	3	1	2	0	0
(New Zealand) 1982	Third place	12	6	5	1	0
(Australia) 1988	Third place	9	6	3	0	0
(England) 1993	Runners-up	8	7	1	0	0
(India) 1997	Runners-up	6	4	1	1	0
(New Zealand) 2000	Champions	9	8	1	0	0
(South Africa) 2005	Semi finalists	8	4	2	0	2
(Australia) 2009	Runners-up	7	5	2	0	0
(India) 2013	Super Sixes	7	3	4	0	0
(England) 2017	Group stage	7	3	3	0	1
(New Zealand) 2022	Group Stage	7	3	4	0	0
Total	1 Title	89	53	30	2	4

==== ICC Women's T20 World Cup ====
T20 World Cup record
Year	Round	GP	W	L	T	NR
(England) 2009	Runners-up	5	4	1	0	0
(Cricket West Indies) 2010	Runners-up	5	4	1	0	0
(Sri Lanka) 2012	Semi-finalists	4	2	2	0	0
(Bangladesh) 2014	Group stage	5	4	1	0	0
(India) 2016	Semi-finalists	5	4	1	0	0
(Cricket West Indies) 2018	Group stage	4	2	2	0	0
(Australia) 2020	Group stage	4	2	2	0	0
(South Africa) 2023	Group stage	4	2	2	0	0
(United Arab Emirates) 2024	Champions	6	5	1	0	0
Total	1 Title	42	29	13	0	0

==== Commonwealth Games ====
Commonwealth Games record
Year	Round	Position	GP	W	L	T	NR
(England) 2022	Bronze medal	3/8	5	3	2	0	0
Total	0 Title	-	5	3	2	0	0

=== Men's U-19 team ===
==== U-19 World Cup ====
New Zealand's U19 World Cup record
Year	Result	Pos	№	Pld	W	L	T	NR
(Australia) 1988	First round	7th	8	7	2	5	0	0
(South Africa) 1998	Runners Up	2nd	16	7	4	3	0	0
(Sri Lanka) 2000	Second round	7th	16	6	1	4	0	1
(New Zealand) 2002	Second round	6th	16	6	3	2	0	1
(Bangladesh) 2004	Second round	8th	16	6	2	4	0	0
(Sri Lanka) 2006	First round	10th	16	6	3	3	0	0
(Malaysia) 2008	Semi-finals	4th	16	6	3	3	0	0
(New Zealand) 2010	Second round	7th	16	6	4	2	0	0
(Australia) 2012	Semi-finals	4th	16	6	3	3	0	0
(United Arab Emirates) 2014	First round	10th	16	6	3	3	0	0
(Bangladesh) 2016	First round	12th	16	6	2	4	0	0
(New Zealand) 2018	Second round	8th	16	6	3	3	0	0
(South Africa) 2020	Semi-finals	4th	16	6	2	2	0	2
(Cricket West Indies) 2022	Withdrew due to COVID-19 pandemic							
(South Africa) 2024	Qualified							
Total				80	35	41	0	4

=== Women's U-19 team ===
==== Under-19 Women's World Cup ====
New Zealand Women's U19's Twenty20 World Cup Record
Year	Result	Pos	№	Pld	W	L	T	NR
(South Africa) 2023	Semi-finals	–	16	6	5	1	0	0
(Malaysia) (Thailand) 2025	To be determined							
(Bangladesh) (Nepal) 2027	To be determined							
Total				6	5	1	0	0

== Cricket development ==
New Zealand Cricket has established High Performance Cricket training centre based at Lincoln University. It also operates a grassroots development programme for school children called 'MILO Kiwi Cricket' . John Wright, former NZ opening batsman, was appointed acting high performance manager for NZC in November 2007.

New Zealand has many private cricket academies and the Bracewell Cricket Academy based at Rathkeale College is one of the largest cricket academies, providing an Overseas Cricket Development Programme, a Pre-Season Coaching Camp, a Festival of Cricket.

There are around 170,000 registered cricketers in New Zealand and is steadily increasing. By way of comparison, Australia has 1.3 million and the UK around 500,000. According to Mark O'Neill, New Zealand's batting coach from 2007 to 2009, the competition at club level in NZ is nowhere near as intense as in Australia.

"In Sydney there are 20 first grade teams, each club has five grades. To get to first grade you've got to be a friggin' good player and once you get there the competition is very, very fierce. Unfortunately it's not the same standard [in NZ]. Competition is everything and the only way the New Zealand guys are going to get that is to play the world's best players."

== Funding ==
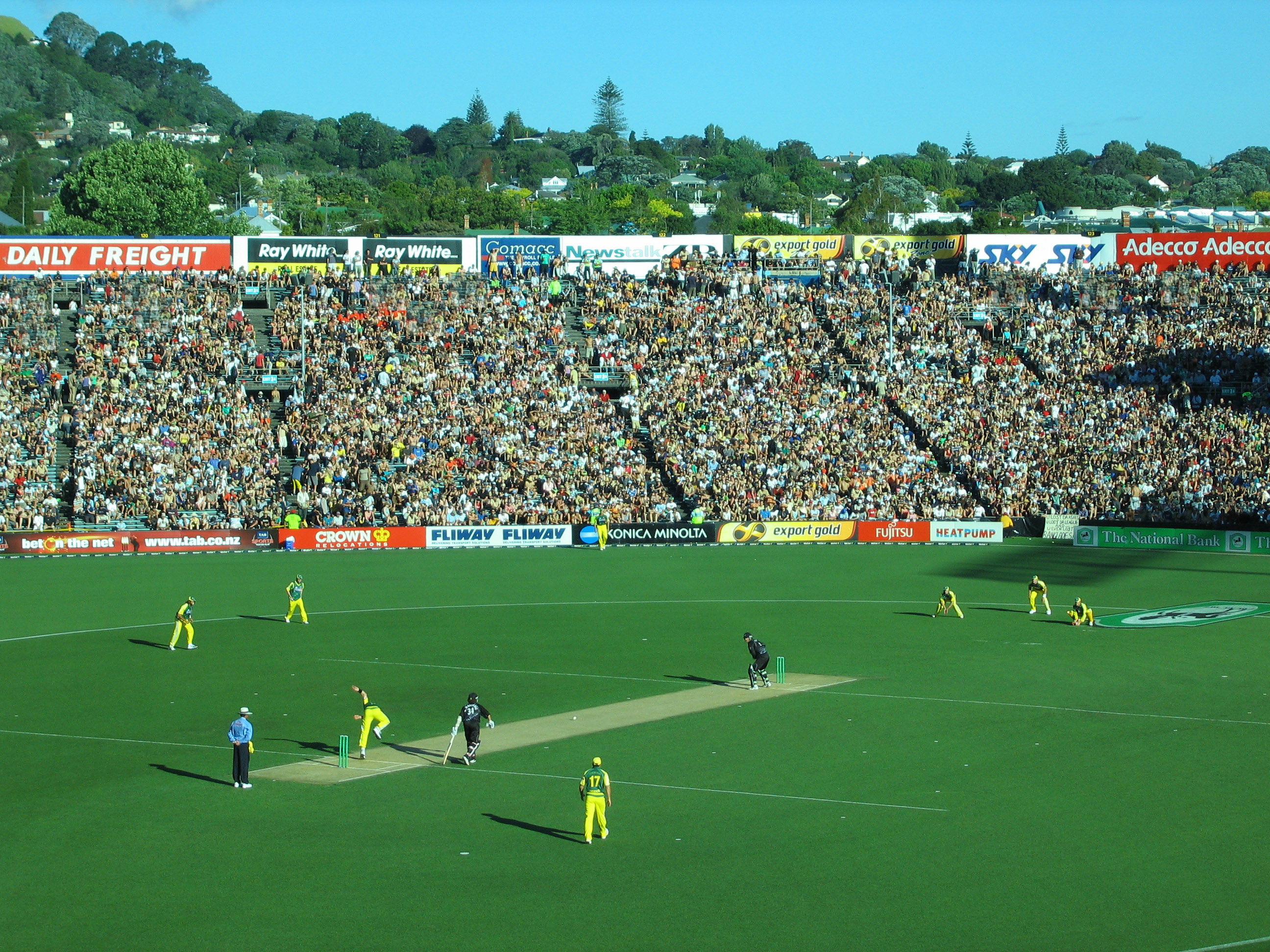
Australia vs. New Zealand, Eden Park, Game 1 of the Chappell-Hadlee Series 2005.

New Zealand Cricket derives most of its revenue from the sale of 2 types of broadcasting rights.

1. Broadcasting rights to home internationals.
2. A share of the broadcasting rights the ICC sells to its tournaments, such as the World Cup.

Host nations pick up all the expenses of touring teams, but get sole access to all broadcast rights and gate receipts.

In November 2007 it was announced that NZC had made a 5-year deal for the broadcasting rights to home internationals for NZ$65.4m with Sony Entertainment Television. The previous four-year deal between NZC and ESPN-Star was for only NZ$14.4m. Part of the 5-fold increase in value is due to the Indian team's tour of NZ in 2009.

Immediately prior to the 2009 Indian tour of NZ the Sunday Star-Times reported that "NZ Cricket hits $25m jackpot".

The article claimed that NZ Cricket will get $1 million for each of the 22 days the Indians take the field and that NZ Cricket had insured against loss of income for the sale of TV rights due to bad weather. NZC boss Justin Vaughan also said that a tour by India generates "many times" more income than tours by Australia, South Africa and England and that the Indian tour was worth more to NZC than the payout from the Cricket World Cup, which was around $20m.

The article also states that over the past two years, NZC's income has been around $30m, but this year (2009) Vaughan is hoping to get more than $40 million from broadcast rights, sponsorship and ticket sales.

In 2007, the ICC sold the rights to broadcast the World Cup, the Champions Trophy and the ICC World Twenty20 to ESPN Star Sports until 2015 for US$1 billion. NZC will receive a slice of that.

In November 2017, Star Sports acquired the broadcast and digital rights for New Zealand Cricket for all men's and women's international matches being organised in the country till April 2020 for the Indian subcontinent and Southeast Asia.

== Player income ==
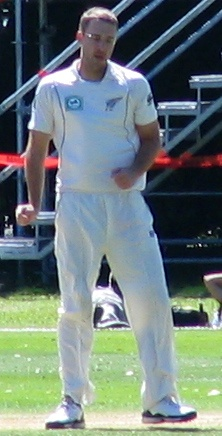

Twenty five per cent of NZC's revenue is allocated to player salaries.

As a result of a new five-year deal and Indian Premier League income, top New Zealand cricketers were earning more than the country's highest-paid rugby union players in the late 2000s and early 2010s. At that time, top-tier rugby union players were paid around NZ$500,000 per year by the NZRU. In 2009, Dan Carter, the most valuable New Zealand rugby player, was estimated to earn between $700,000 and $900,000 a year (including endorsements). McCullum, the highest paid cricketer, was estimated to be earning between $1 million and $1.5 million yearly, which included IPL payments. By 2014, and even more so by 2016, cricketers were dropping down the New Zealand Herald sporting rich list as rugby players and other athletes secured more lucrative contracts - often overseas - than those offered in cricket. Nonetheless, several cricketers came in places 11–20 with earnings of $NZ800,000 to $1.1m.

In 2016 Kane Williamson, the country's top-ranked cricketer, earned NZ$205,266 as a basic retainer. This figure decreased in increments of $6000 and the 21st ranked player received $85,585. Kane Williamson also earned a $40,000 captains fee. Match payments were set at NZ$8,495 per test match, NZ$3,682 per one-day international and NZ$2,407 per Twenty20 international. On average, New Zealand plays 10 test matches, 25–30 one-day matches and around 10 Twenty20 matches a year. There is also prize money for winning games. Players such as Williamson, Trent Boult and Tim Southee - who at that time played in virtually all of New Zealand's matches - earned between $300,000 and $400,000 from NZC, with the next five or six earning between $180,000 and $300,000.

== "Banned" players ==
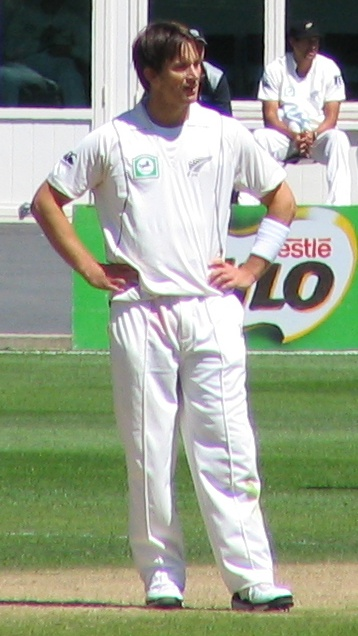
Shane Bond was banned for playing in ICL but returned to official cricket in 2009

Former Black Caps Nathan Astle, Chris Harris, Craig McMillan, Hamish Marshall, Lou Vincent and Daryl Tuffey who played in the "rebel" Indian Cricket League were effectively "banned" from ever playing for NZ again.

Justin Vaughan former NZ Cricket CEO, perhaps with one eye on the legal ramifications, did not use the "b" word but preferred terms such as; "the selectors will be encouraged to consider other players", or "overlooked for selection". It also appeared that the players would not be able to hold a contract from their provinces but would be allowed to play on a game by game basis.

In January 2008 it was announced that Shane Bond had signed a US$800,000 a year contract to play for the ICL for 3 years. Bond's agent Leanne McGoldrick said that Bond intended to honour his contract with NZ cricket until May 2008. However, NZC decided to "overlook Bond for selection" because all members of the International Cricket Council had agreed not to pick players who have signed for the rebel leagues. NZC did not want to jeopardise its relationship with the ICC, as it relies heavily on them for funding.

This put Bond and NZC in a precarious position, as prior to signing his ICL contract, he had been given permission to play in the ICL by NZC (believing they were not contravening ICC rules) while still able to play in New Zealand international games. Bond chose not to press the issue, deciding to play solely in the ICL.

In September 1977, Tony Greig, Mike Procter and John Snow with support from Kerry Packer contested the bans they had been subjected to by the TCCB for playing in World Series Cricket in the English high court. The court ruled that the bans were a restraint of trade and therefore illegal.

On 29 January 2008, the New Zealand Herald stated that Bond, who wants to play in the upcoming series against England, and NZ Cricket was released from his NZC contract and will not be chosen on a game-by-game basis. Bond appears to have given up on legal action for restraint of trade.

Heath Mills, the executive manager of the New Zealand Cricket Players Association (NZCPA), was not so conciliatory. He accused NZC of acting to appease the Indian board (BCCI). Mills described the ICC operating manual regulation that purports to not allow [ICC members] to release players to participate in non-sanctioned events as restraint of trade.

Mills also said :

"The NZCPA fully understands the position NZC has found itself and we do not want them to damage relationships with the BCCI and other ICC members. However, pressure to preserve these relationships should not be placed above preserving New Zealand's right to select its best players to represent the Black Caps, the rights and aspirations of New Zealand citizens to represent their country and the legal rights of players under their signed playing contracts.

Given the issues Bond has decided to stand aside from international cricket at NZC's request. The NZCPA supports this decision as it enables him to preserve a strong relationship with the board of NZC in the hope that he can again contribute to the game in New Zealand at some stage in the future. However, this is not a decision that he was compelled to make and under our contract system negotiated with NZC it remains open for any player to play for a third party like the ICL and still remain contracted to and play for NZC.

It is this situation that leaves the NZCPA concerned for cricket in New Zealand. We urge the ICC to step in and attempt to influence this situation and find a way to manage third party investment in our sport before we lose more players both here and around the world, and international cricket has been damaged further. History has shown that professional sports cannot afford to become split. It is absolutely vital that international cricket remains the pinnacle of the sport and that we ensure the best players are playing."

In any event, Bond himself has said that due to the risk of injury he no longer wants to play test cricket for NZ.

Due to the financial problems as a result of the 2008 'credit crunch', the ICL cancelled part of its schedule, and offered to release the New Zealand players from their contracts, some of whom had not been paid for several months.

== See also ==
- Cricket Live Foundation
- New Zealand Cricket Awards
