= New Zealand Cricket Almanack =

New Zealand cricket annual

- 2023 edition
- Editor: Francis Payne; Ian Smith
- Former editors: Arthur Carman (1948–1982); Noel S. MacDonald (1948–1960)
- Categories: Cricket
- Frequency: Annual
- Format: Paperback / softback
- Publisher: Upstart Press
- Founder: Arthur Carman
- Founded: 1948
- First issue: 1948; 78 years ago
- Country: New Zealand
- Based in: Auckland, New Zealand
- Language: English
- ISSN: 1174-7552

The New Zealand Cricket Almanack (formerly The Cricket Almanack of New Zealand) is an annual publication that covers the cricket played in New Zealand and by the New Zealand national team over the previous 12 months. It has been published every year since the inaugural edition in 1948. As of 2025 it is published by Upstart Press in Auckland.

== History ==
The Wellington sports journalist, bookseller and publisher Arthur Carman founded the annual Rugby Almanack of New Zealand in 1935. It is still published annually, under the name Rugby Almanack, by Upstart Press in Auckland. In late 1948, with the support and encouragement of the New Zealand Cricket Council, Carman and Noel S. MacDonald edited and produced the first edition of The Cricket Almanack of New Zealand, published by Carman's company Sporting Publications, of Wellington. At 101 pages, and partly modelled on the British annual Wisden Cricketers' Almanack, it included sections that have continued to form the basis of the annual: editorial comments, two players of the year, all Test and other first-class matches with reports and scores, Hawke Cup scores, obituaries, and extensive statistics and records. The price was five shillings.

Writing about the 1950 Almanack in the 1951 edition of Wisden, John Arlott said: "Authoritative, carefully made up, impressively objective, it avoids the fault of parochialism" and "is now, in its third year, fully established and still growing". In the 1987 cricket anthology Bat & Pad, Ron Palenski wrote: "The Cricket Almanack rightly deserves its reputation as being a reliable and faithful recorder of a season's scores and statistics", adding that it has also at times been critical of aspects of New Zealand cricket. He included two of the Almanack's more critical editorials in his anthology.

Carman and MacDonald edited the Almanack together until the 1960 edition, after which Carman edited it on his own until he died not long after putting out the 1982 edition. He was succeeded for the 1983 edition by Francis Payne and Ian Smith, and they were still the editors in 2025. The title was The Cricket Almanack of New Zealand from 1948 to 1966, The Shell Cricket Almanack of New Zealand from 1967 to 1997 (sponsored by Shell Oil New Zealand), and New Zealand Cricket Almanack from 1998 to the present.

With their first edition in 1983, Payne and Smith introduced a new section titled "Happenings", which the cricket writer Dick Brittenden described at the time as "a welcome addition … a melange of unusual facts". In a review of the 2003 Almanack, sports journalist Lynn McConnell called "Happenings" "a fascinating repository of statistical events that might not normally be part of such a publication … this is one of the most intriguing parts of this annual delight". McConnell concluded his review by saying, "The Almanack is clearly the most pre-eminent record of a sport published in New Zealand and as a book of figures in the community overall, its only serious challenger must surely be the Government Yearbook." Another change Payne and Smith made was to remove the ban on players being selected more than once as the Almanack's players of the year.

A rival annual, the DB Cricket Annual (also known under other sponsors' names), was published from 1972 to 1987. Reviewing the 1987 editions of both publications, the Christchurch Press commended them both, but added that "a New Zealand cricket journalist's most valuable summer possession is 'The Almanack'".

In 2025, in recognition of his contributions to the documentation of New Zealand cricket history, most notably through his 42 years as co-editor of the Almanack, New Zealand Cricket awarded Francis Payne the Bert Sutcliffe Medal for outstanding services to cricket.

The Almanack is published in Auckland by Upstart Press. The 2021 edition has 544 pages, of which the last 279 pages are of New Zealand cricket records. The price of the 2025 edition is NZ$55.
