= New Zealand Cricket Awards =

Cricket Awards

The New Zealand Cricket Awards (also known as ANZ New Zealand Cricket Awards for sponsorship reasons) are a set of annual cricket awards given by New Zealand Cricket. The awards recognise and honour the best of New Zealander players, match officials and administrators.

== History ==
The New Zealand Cricket Awards was launched in 1970 by New Zealand Cricket Council with Cobb & Co. as its title sponsor, and awarded then existing awards Best Batsman and Best Bowler of Plunket Shield Trophy. However, a notable list of awards featuring two major awards Men's International Player of the Year and Women's International Player of the Year first awarded in 1997.

The winners of the awards are selected by a panel of judges which mainly consists of eminent former cricketers from New Zealand. Sir Richard Hadlee, Ian Smith, John F. Reid, Debbie Hockley and Lesley Murdoch have been part of this panel.

Kane Williamson and Daniel Vettori have won the Men's International Player of the Year award record four times each. In the same category in women's cricket, Suzie Bates has won it most times with four awards. Debbie Hockley is the only woman cricketer to have won the International Player of the Year award, won it in 1998.

In 2011, The New Zealand Cricket introduced the Sir Richard Hadlee Medal to recognise the Men's International Player of the Year. The Women's version of this medal the Debbie Hockley Medal was introduced in 2023. The inaugural recipients were Chris Martin and Amelia Kerr respectively.

== List of winners ==
=== 1996-97 ===
- Men's International Player of the Year : Simon Doull.
- Women's International Player of the Year : Debbie Hockley
- Women's Best Batting Performance of the Year : Debbie Hockley
- Women's Best Bowling Performance of the Year : Katrina Withers
- Best ODI Batting Performance of the Year : Stephen Fleming
- Best ODI Bowling Performance of the Year : Chris Harris
- BNZ Player of the Series : Simon Doull
- First-Class Batting Performance of the Year : Stephen Fleming
- First-Class Bowling Performance of the Year : Simon Doull
- Men's Young Player of the Year : Daniel Vettori
- Women's Young Player of the Year : Frances King
- International Groundsman of the Year : John Olsen
- Domestic Groundsman of the Year : Peter Domigan
- Umpire of the Year : Steve Dunne

=== 1997-98 ===
- International Player of the Year : Debbie Hockley.

=== 1998-99 ===
- International Player of the Year : Nathan Astle.
- Best ODI Batting Performance of the Year : Nathan Astle
- Best ODI Bowling Performance of the Year : Geoff Allott
- Women's Best Batting Performance of the Year : Debbie Hockley
- Women's Best Bowling Performance of the Year : Katrina Withers
- Men's Domestic Player of the Year : Jacob Oram
- Women's Domestic Player of the Year : Clare Nicholson
- First-Class Batting Performance of the Year : Matt Horne
- BNZ Player of the Series : Nathan Astle
- First-Class Bowling Performance of the Year : Andrew Penn
- Groundsman of the Year : Mark Perham
- Umpire of the Year : Steve Dunne
- Coach of the Year : Mark Greatbatch

=== 1999-00 ===
- International Player of the Year : Chris Cairns.

=== 2000-01 ===
- International Player of the Year : Mark Richardson.
- Best ODI Batting Performance of the Year : Roger Twose
- Best ODI Bowling Performance of the Year : Daryl Tuffey
- Women's Best Batting Performance of the Year : Emily Drumm
- Women's Best Bowling Performance of the Year : Katrina Keenan
- Men's Domestic Player of the Year : Grant Bradburn
- Women's Domestic Player of the Year : Rachel Pullar
- First-Class Batting Performance of the Year : Mark Richardson
- First-Class Bowling Performance of the Year : Daryl Tuffey
- Outstanding Services to Cricket : Walter Hadlee

=== 2001-02 ===
- International Player of the Year : Nathan Astle.
- Best ODI Batting Performance of the Year : Nathan Astle
- Best ODI Bowling Performance of the Year : Shane Bond
- Women's Best Batting Performance of the Year : Emily Drumm
- Women's Best Bowling Performance of the Year : Rachel Pullar
- Men's Domestic Player of the Year : Matt Horne
- Women's Domestic Player of the Year : Anna Corbin
- First-Class Batting Performance of the Year : Nathan Astle
- First-Class Bowling Performance of the Year : Chris Drum
- Outstanding Services to Cricket : John R. Reid

=== 2002-03 ===
- International Player of the Year : Shane Bond.
- Best ODI Batting Performance of the Year : Stephen Fleming
- Best ODI Bowling Performance of the Year : Shane Bond
- Women's Best Batting Performance of the Year : Maia Lewis
- Women's Best Bowling Performance of the Year : Rebecca Steele
- Men's Domestic Player of the Year : Matthew Walker
- Women's Domestic Player of the Year : Aimee Mason
- First-Class Batting Performance of the Year : Mark Richardson
- First-Class Bowling Performance of the Year : Shane Bond
- Outstanding Services to Cricket : Frank Cameron

=== 2003-04 ===
- International Player of the Year : Stephen Fleming.
- Best ODI Batting Performance of the Year : Stephen Fleming
- Best ODI Bowling Performance of the Year : Daryl Tuffey
- Women's Best Batting Performance of the Year : Haidee Tiffen
- Women's Best Bowling Performance of the Year : Rebecca Steele
- Men's Domestic Player of the Year : Chris Harris
- Women's Domestic Player of the Year : Aimee Mason
- First-Class Batting Performance of the Year : Scott Styris
- First-Class Bowling Performance of the Year : Chris Martin
- Outstanding Services to Cricket : Graham Dowling

=== 2004-05 ===
- Men's International Player of the Year : Daniel Vettori.
- Women's Best Batting Performance of the Year : Haidee Tiffen
- Women's Best Bowling Performance of the Year : Rebeca Steele
- Best ODI Batting Performance of the Year : Hamish Marshall
- Best ODI Bowling Performance of the Year : Daniel Vettori
- Men's Domestic Player of the Year : Craig Cumming
- Women's Domestic Player of the Year : Nicola Browne
- First-Class Batting Performance of the Year : Hamish Marshall
- First-Class Bowling Performance of the Year : Daniel Vettori

=== 2005-06 ===
- International Player of the Year : Daniel Vettori.
- Best ODI Batting Performance of the Year : Nathan Astle
- Best ODI Bowling Performance of the Year : Shane Bond
- Women's Best Batting Performance of the Year : Emily Drumm
- Women's Best Bowling Performance of the Year : Louise Milliken
- Men's Domestic Player of the Year : Jonathan Trott
- Women's Domestic Player of the Year : Aimee Mason
- First-Class Batting Performance of the Year : Mathew Sinclair
- First-Class Bowling Performance of the Year : Chris Martin
- Outstanding Services to Cricket : Peter Sharp

=== 2006-07 ===
- International Player of the Year : Shane Bond.
- Best ODI Batting Performance of the Year : Scott Styris
- Best ODI Bowling Performance of the Year : Shane Bond
- Women's Best Batting Performance of the Year : Maria Fahey
- Women's Best Bowling Performance of the Year : Helen Watson
- Men's Domestic Player of the Year : Chris Harris
- Women's Domestic Player of the Year : Sophie Devine
- First-Class Batting Performance of the Year : Michael Papps
- First-Class Bowling Performance of the Year : Chris Martin
- Outstanding Services to Cricket : Mike Shrimpton

=== 2007-08 ===
- International Player of the Year : Brendon McCullum.
- Best ODI Batting Performance of the Year : Brendon McCullum
- Best ODI Bowling Performance of the Year : Kyle Mills
- Women's Best Batting Performance of the Year : Nicola Browne
- Women's Best Bowling Performance of the Year : Helen Watson
- Best All Rounder of the Year : Jacob Oram
- Men's Domestic Player of the Year : Nathan McCullum.
- Women's Domestic Player of the Year : Sara McGlashan
- First-Class Batting Performance of the Year : Ross Taylor
- First-Class Bowling Performance of the Year : Chris Martin
- Young Player of the Year : Kane Williamson
- Outstanding Junior Cricket Administrator : Michael Cotter
- Outstanding Services to Cricket : Sir Richard Hadlee

=== 2008-09 ===
- International Player of the Year : Daniel Vettori.
- Best ODI Batting Performance of the Year : Martin Guptill
- Best ODI Bowling Performance of the Year : Kyle Mills
- Best All Rounder of the Year : Daniel Vettori
- Women's Best Batting Performance of the Year : Haidee Tiffen
- Women's Best Bowling Performance of the Year : Kate Pulford
- Men's Domestic Player of the Year : Mathew Sinclair
- Women's Domestic Player of the Year : Sophie Devine
- First-Class Batting Performance of the Year : Jesse Ryder
- First-Class Bowling Performance of the Year : Daniel Vettori
- Young Player of the Year : Adam Milne
- Outstanding Junior Cricket Administrator : Stephen Jones
- Outstanding Services to Cricket : Alan Whimp

=== 2009-10 ===
- International Player of the Year : Daniel Vettori.
- Best ODI Batting Performance of the Year : Brendon McCullum
- Best ODI Bowling Performance of the Year : Daniel Vettori
- Best All Rounder of the Year : Brendon McCullum
- Women's Best Batting Performance of the Year : Suzie Bates
- Women's Best Bowling Performance of the Year : Nicola Browne
- Men's Domestic Player of the Year : Michael Bates
- Women's Domestic Player of the Year : Nicola Browne
- First-Class Batting Performance of the Year : Ross Taylor
- First-Class Bowling Performance of the Year : Daniel Vettori.
- Young Player of the Year : Matthew Rowe
- Fans Choice Individual Performance of the Year : Brendon McCullum
- Outstanding Junior Cricket Administrator : John Grocott
- Outstanding Services to Cricket : Martin Horton

=== 2010-11 ===
- Men's International Player of the Year : Chris Martin.
- Women's International Player of the Year : Sara McGlashan
- Test Player of the Year : Brendon McCullum
- ODI Player of the Year : Ross Taylor
- T20I Player of the Year : Tim Southee
- Men's Domestic Player of the Year : Rob Nicol
- Women's Domestic Player of the Year : Sophie Devine
- First-Class Batting Performance of the Year : Peter Ingram
- First-Class Bowling Performance of the Year : Chris Martin
- Young Player of the Year : Simon Hickey
- Fans Choice Individual Performance of the Year : Neil Wagner
- Outstanding Junior Cricket Administrator : Nick Craig
- Outstanding Services to Cricket : Ces Renwick

=== 2011-12 ===
- Men's International Player of the Year : Martin Guptill.
- Women's International Player of the Year : Amy Satterthwaite
- Test Player of the Year : Doug Bracewell
- ODI Player of the Year : Martin Guptill
- T20I Player of the Year : Martin Guptill
- Men's Domestic Player of the Year : Gareth Hopkins
- Women's Domestic Player of the Year : Frances McKay
- First-Class Batting Performance of the Year : Martin Guptill
- First-Class Bowling Performance of the Year : Doug Bracewell
- Young Player of the Year : Simon Hickey
- Fans Choice Individual Performance of the Year : Doug Bracewell
- Outstanding Services to Cricket : Cran Bull

=== 2012-13 ===
- Men's International Player of the Year : Ross Taylor.
- Women's International Player of the Year : Suzie Bates
- Test Player of the Year : Ross Taylor
- ODI Player of the Year : Brendon McCullum
- T20I Player of the Year : Brendon McCullum
- Men's Domestic Player of the Year : Jesse Ryder
- Women's Domestic Player of the Year : Suzie Bates
- First-Class Batting Performance of the Year : Peter Fulton
- First-Class Bowling Performance of the Year : Tim Southee

=== 2013-14 ===
- Men's International Player of the Year : Ross Taylor.
- Women's International Player of the Year : Suzie Bates
- Test Player of the Year : Ross Taylor
- ODI Player of the Year : Ross Taylor
- T20I Player of the Year : Mitchell McClenaghan
- Men's Domestic Player of the Year : Brett Hampton
- Women's Domestic Player of the Year : Suzie Bates
- First-Class Batting Performance of the Year : Ross Taylor
- First-Class Bowling Performance of the Year : Tim Southee

=== 2014-15 ===
- Men's International Player of the Year : Brendon McCullum.
- Women's International Player of the Year : Suzie Bates
- Test Player of the Year : Kane Williamson.
- ODI Player of the Year : Kane Williamson
- T20I Player of the Year : Kane Williamson
- Men's Domestic Player of the Year : Andrew Ellis
- Women's Domestic Player of the Year : Amy Satterthwaite
- Outstanding Services to Cricket : Ross Dykes

=== 2015-16 ===
- Men's International Player of the Year : Kane Williamson.
- Women's International Player of the Year : Suzie Bates
- Test Player of the Year : Kane Williamson
- Men's ODI Player of the Year : Martin Guptill
- Men's T20I Player of the Year : Martin Guptill
- Men's First-Class Batting Performance of the Year : Kane Williamson
- Women's Domestic Player of the Year : Amy Satterthwaite
- Men's First-Class Bowling Performance of the Year : Trent Boult
- Outstanding Services to Cricket : Rex Smith

=== 2016-17 ===
- International Player of the Year : Kane Williamson.
- Test Player of the Year : Neil Wagner
- Men's ODI Player of the Year : Martin Guptill
- Women's ODI Player of the Year : Amy Satterthwaite
- Men's T20I Player of the Year : Kane Williamson
- Women's T20I Player of the Year : Suzie Bates
- Super Smash Player of the Year : Glenn Phillips
- Men's First-Class Batting Performance of the Year : Kane Williamson
- Women's Domestic Batting Performance of the Year : Katey Martin
- Men's First-Class Bowling Performance of the Year : Neil Wagner
- Women's Domestic Bowling Performance of the Year : Leigh Kasperek
- Outstanding Services to Cricket : Neil Sulzberger

=== 2017-18 ===
- International Player of the Year : Trent Boult.
- Test Player of the Year : Trent Boult.
- Men's ODI Player of the Year : Ross Taylor
- Women's ODI Player of the Year : Sophie Devine
- Men's T20I Player of the Year : Colin Munro
- Women's T20I Player of the Year : Sophie Devine
- Men's Domestic Player of the Year : Ajaz Patel
- Super Smash Player of the Year : Anton Devcich
- Men's First-Class Batting Performance of the Year : Ross Taylor
- Women's Domestic Batting Performance of the Year : Maddy Green
- Men's First-Class Bowling Performance of the Year : Neil Wagner
- Women's Domestic Bowling Performance of the Year : Holly Huddleston
- Outstanding Services to Cricket : Pat Malcon

=== 2018-19 ===
- International Player of the Year : Kane Williamson.
- Test Player of the Year : Kane Williamson
- Men's ODI Player of the Year : Ross Taylor
- Women's ODI Player of the Year : Amelia Kerr
- Men's T20I Player of the Year : Colin Munro
- Women's T20I Player of the Year : Sophie Devine
- Men's Domestic Player of the Year : Devon Conway
- Women's Domestic Player of the Year : Natalie Dodd
- Men's Super Smash Player of the Year : Tom Bruce
- Women's Super Smash Player of the Year : Frankie Mackay
- Men's First-Class Batting Performance of the Year : Kane Williamson
- Women's Domestic Batting Performance of the Year : Natalie Dodd
- Men's First-Class Bowling Performance of the Year : Trent Boult
- Women's Domestic Bowling Performance of the Year : Amelia Kerr
- Umpire of the Year : Chris Brown
- Outstanding Services to Cricket : Ewen Chatfield

=== 2019-20 ===
- International Player of the Year : Ross Taylor.
- Test Player of the Year : Tim Southee
- Men's ODI Player of the Year : Kane Williamson
- Women's ODI Player of the Year : Suzie Bates
- Men's T20I Player of the Year : Ross Taylor
- Women's T20I Player of the Year : Sophie Devine
- Men's Domestic Player of the Year : Devon Conway
- Women's Domestic Player of the Year : Katie Gurrey
- Men's Super Smash Player of the Year : Devon Conway
- Women's Super Smash Player of the Year : Sophie Devine
- Men's First-Class Batting Performance of the Year : Tom Latham
- Women's Domestic Batting Performance of the Year : Katie Gurrey
- Men's First-Class Bowling Performance of the Year : Tim Southee
- Women's Domestic Bowling Performance of the Year : Jess Kerr
- Umpire of the Year : Kim Cotton
- Outstanding Services to Cricket : Ian Smith

=== 2020-21 ===
- International Player of the Year : Kane Williamson.
- Test Player of the Year : Kane Williamson
- Men's ODI Player of the Year : Devon Conway
- Women's ODI Player of the Year : Amy Satterthwaite
- Men's T20I Player of the Year : Devon Conway
- Women's T20I Player of the Year : Amelia Kerr
- Men's Domestic Player of the Year : Daryl Mitchell
- Women's Domestic Player of the Year : Frankie Mackay
- Men's Super Smash Player of the Year : Finn Allen
- Women's Super Smash Player of the Year : Amelia Kerr
- Men's First-Class Batting Performance of the Year : Kane Williamson
- Women's Domestic Batting Performance of the Year : Kate Ebrahim
- Men's First-Class Bowling Performance of the Year : Kyle Jamieson
- Women's Domestic Bowling Performance of the Year : Sarah Asmussen
- Umpire of the Year : Chris Brown
- Outstanding Services to Cricket : Jeff Crowe

=== 2021-22 ===
- International Player of the Year : Tim Southee.
- Test Player of the Year : Devon Conway
- Men's ODI Player of the Year : Will Young
- Women's ODI Player of the Year : Amelia Kerr
- Men's T20I Player of the Year : Trent Boult
- Women's T20I Player of the Year : Sophie Devine
- Men's Domestic Players of the Year : Tom Bruce, Robbie O'Donnell
- Women's Domestic Player of the Year : Nensi Patel
- Men's Super Smash Player of the Year : Michael Bracewell
- Women's Super Smash Player of the Year : Amelia Kerr
- Men's First-Class Batting Performance of the Year : Devon Conway
- Women's Domestic Batting Performance of the Year : Suzie Bates
- Men's First-Class Bowling Performance of the Year : Tim Southee
- Women's Domestic Bowling Performance of the Year : Eden Carson
- Umpire of the Year : Chris Gaffaney
- Outstanding Services to Cricket : Penny Kinsella

=== 2022-23 ===
- Men's International Player of the Year : Daryl Mitchell.
- Women's International Player of the Year : Amelia Kerr.
- Test Player of the Year: Tom Blundell
- Men's ODI Player of the Year : Michael Bracewell
- Women's ODI Player of the Year : Suzie Bates
- Men's T20I Player of the Year : Glenn Philips
- Women's T20I Player of the Year : Amelia Kerr
- Men's Domestic Player of the Year: Dean Foxcroft
- Women's Domestic Player of the Year: Kate Anderson
- Men's Super Smash Player of the Year : Dean Foxcroft
- Women's Super Smash Player of the Year : Kate Anderson
- Men's First-Class Batting Performance of the Year : Daryl Mitchell
- Women's Domestic Batting Performance of the Year : Kate Anderson
- Men's First-Class Bowling Performance of the Year : Tim Southee
- Women's Domestic Bowling Performance of the Year : Gabby Sullivan
- Umpire of the Year : Chris Brown
- Outstanding Services to Cricket : Heath Mills

=== 2023-24 ===
- Men's International Player of the Year : Rachin Ravindra.
- Women's International Player of the Year : Amelia Kerr
- Test Player of the Year : Kane Williamson
- Men's ODI Player of the Year : Daryl Mitchell
- Women's ODI Player of the Year : Amelia Kerr
- Men's T20I Player of the Year : Mitchell Santner
- Women's T20I Player of the Year : Amelia Kerr
- Men's Domestic Player of the Year : Nathan Smith
- Women's Domestic Player of the Year : Emma Black
- Men's Super Smash Player of the Year : Danru Ferns
- Women's Super Smash Player of the Year : Amelia Kerr
- Men's First-Class Batting Performance of the Year : Kane Williamson
- Women's Domestic Batting Performance of the Year : Suzie Bates
- Men's First-Class Bowling Performance of the Year : Matt Henry
- Women's Domestic Bowling Performance of the Year : Emma Black
- Umpire of the Year : Chris Brown
- Outstanding Services to Cricket : Trudy Anderson

=== 2024-25 ===
- Men's International Player of the Year : Matt Henry.
- Women's International Player of the Year : Amelia Kerr
- Test Player of the Year : Matt Henry
- Men's ODI Player of the Year : Matt Henry
- Women's ODI Player of the Year : Amelia Kerr
- Men's T20I Player of the Year : Jacob Duffy
- Women's T20I Player of the Year : Amelia Kerr
- Men's Domestic Player of the Year : Brett Hampton
- Women's Domestic Player of the Year : Eden Carson
- Super Smash Men's Player of the Year : Tom Bruce
- Super Smash Women's Player of the Year : Amelia Kerr
- Men's First-Class Batting performance of the Year : Kane Williamson
- Women's Domestic Batting performance of the Year : Maddy Green
- Men's First-Class Bowling performance of the Year : Matt Henry
- Women's Domestic Bowling performance of the Year : Eden Carson
- Umpire of the Year : Chris Gaffaney
- Outstanding Services to Cricket : Francis Payne

== Development awards ==
The New Zealand Cricket introduced a new set of awards in 2008, to recognise the excellent contributions of community personnel and organizations towards the development of the game. The awards later renamed as Community Awards in 2019.
