= Weenink =

Weenink is a surname. Notable people with this surname include:

- Henri Weenink (1892–1931), a Dutch chess player
- Scott Weenink (born 1973), a New Zealand businessman
- Sebastiaan Weenink (born 1986), a Dutch squash player
- Vanessa Weenink (born 1978), a New Zealand politician
