= Debbie Hockley Medal =

Annual award for New Zealand's men's cricketer of the year

The Debbie Hockley Medal is an annual award introduced in 2023 by New Zealand Cricket to recognise the best New Zealand women's cricketer of the previous year. It is named in honour of New Zealand cricketer, Debbie Hockley. As of 2026, it has only been won by Amelia Kerr, who has won it all 4 years.

The men's version of this medal was introduced in 2011 as the Sir Richard Hadlee Medal.

== Past recipients ==
Year	Winner	Ref
2023	Amelia Kerr	
2024	Amelia Kerr	
2025	Amelia Kerr	
2026	Amelia Kerr	
