= Sir Richard Hadlee Medal =

Award for New Zealand's men's cricketer of the year

The Sir Richard Hadlee Medal is an annual award introduced in 2011 by New Zealand Cricket to recognise the best New Zealand men's cricketer of the previous year. It is named in honour of New Zealand cricketer, Sir Richard Hadlee.

The women's version of this medal was introduced in 2023 as the Debbie Hockley Medal.

== Past recipients ==
Year	Winner	Ref
2011	Chris Martin	
2012	Martin Guptill	
2013	Ross Taylor	
2014	Ross Taylor	
2015	Brendon McCullum	
2016	Kane Williamson	
2017	Kane Williamson	
2018	Trent Boult	
2019	Kane Williamson	
2020	Ross Taylor	
2021	Kane Williamson	
2022	Tim Southee	
2023	Daryl Mitchell	
2024	Rachin Ravindra	
2025	Matt Henry	
2026	Jacob Duffy	
