= Geoff Allott =

New Zealand cricketer (born 1971)

Personal information
- Full name: Geoffrey Ian Allott
- Born: 24 December 1971 (age 54); Christchurch, New Zealand
- Batting: Right-handed
- Bowling: Left-arm fast-medium

International information
- National side: New Zealand (1996–2000)
- Test debut (cap 196): 13 January 1996 v Zimbabwe
- Last Test: 22 July 1999 v England
- ODI debut (cap 98): 26 February 1997 v England
- Last ODI: 1 November 2000 v South Africa
- ODI shirt no.: 15

Career statistics
Competition	Test	ODI	FC	LA
Matches	10	31	31	66
Runs scored	27	17	107	29
Batting average	3.37	3.39	4.86	4.14
100s/50s	0/0	0/0	0/0	0/0
Top score	8*	7*	13*	7*
Balls bowled	2,023	1,528	5,947	3,008
Wickets	19	52	102	95
Bowling average	58.47	23.21	30.36	23.80
5 wickets in innings	0	0	4	0
10 wickets in match	0	0	1	0
Best bowling	4/74	4/35	6/60	4/23
Catches/stumpings	2/–	5/–	6/–	15/–
Medal record
Men's cricket
Representing New Zealand
ICC Champions Trophy
Winner	2000 Kenya
Commonwealth Games
Third place	1998 Kuala Lumpur
- Source: Cricinfo, 4 May 2017

Geoffrey Ian Allott (born 24 December 1971) is a former New Zealand cricketer who played internationally for New Zealand, and since April 2026 CEO of New Zealand Cricket. Allott played in 10 Tests and 31 One Day Internationals (ODIs) from 1996 to 2000. In the New Zealand domestic competition he played for the Canterbury cricket team as an opening bowler. Allott retired from all cricket in 2001, following series of injuries. Allott was a member of the New Zealand team that won the 2000 ICC KnockOut Trophy.

== International career ==
Allott was a member of the New Zealand squad that won a bronze medal at the 1998 Commonwealth Games, which was the only time cricket was included in Commonwealth games. Allott was a revelation at the 1999 Cricket World Cup in England May/June 1999. With 20 wickets in nine matches he topped the wicket taking ranks for the tournament. Gaining prodigious movement in the air and off the pitch, the left-armer deceived some of the world's best batsmen, and made a huge contribution towards New Zealand's semi-final finish.

He was first selected by Glenn Turner for the Test series against Zimbabwe in 1995/6, when New Zealand had an injury crisis and were looking to give Test experience to new players of quality. Although he was moderately successful he was not selected for the subsequent ODI series or for the 1996 Cricket World Cup. A quick left armer in the Richard Collinge "dig it in" mould he was considered too inaccurate for limited overs. Over the winter he built up his strength and bowled well for his province at the start of 1996/7. A great game for New Zealand A versus England in 1997 earned him a recall to the Test team, and he bowled far better in two Tests than his figures might indicate.

=== Trivia ===
He held the record for the longest time taken to score a duck in Test cricket as well as taking a long time to get off the mark, but was dismissed for duck – 77 balls and 101 minutes for New Zealand versus South Africa in 1999. Though his record for longest time for a duck still stands, his record for longest time for no runs was held until March 2013, when England cricketer Stuart Broad batted for 103 minutes against New Zealand before scoring a run.

== NZ Cricket ==
On 28 April 2026, New Zealand Cricket named Allott as their new CEO, replacing Scott Weenink, who resigned in December 2025.
