= Scott Weenink =

New Zealand cricketer

Personal information
- Full name: Scott William Weenink
- Born: 1 January 1973 (age 53); Christchurch, Canterbury, New Zealand
- Batting: Right-handed
- Bowling: Right-arm off break

Domestic team information
- Years: Team
- 1995/96–1996/97: Wellington
- 2000: Oxford Universities
- 2000: Oxford University

Career statistics
Competition	First-class	List A
Matches	12	7
Runs scored	224	142
Batting average	13.17	20.28
100s/50s	–/1	1/–
Top score	72*	113
Balls bowled	1,050	0
Wickets	10	–
Bowling average	64.10	–
5 wickets in innings	–	–
10 wickets in match	–	–
Best bowling	4/69	–
Catches/stumpings	7/–	2/–
- Source: Cricinfo, 7 July 2020

Scott William Weenink (born 1 January 1973) is a New Zealand businessman, former first-class cricketer and representative rugby player.

== Education and sporting career ==
Weenink was born at Christchurch in January 1973. He later studied at Victoria University of Wellington, and while studying there he played representative cricket for Wellington in the 1995/96 and 1996/97 seasons, making six first-class appearances in the Shell Trophy and seven List A one-day appearances in the Shell Cup. In first-class cricket, Weenink scored 100 runs for Wellington at an average of exactly 10 and a high score of 40. With his off break bowling, he took 4 wickets with these all coming in one innings against Central Districts. In List A one-day matches, he scored 142 runs at an average of 20.28, with a high score of 113 against Central Districts.

Weenink undertook postgraduate studies in England at Wolfson College at the University of Oxford. While studying at Oxford, he played first-class cricket on six occasions in 2000, with five appearances for an Oxford Universities side, a forerunner of Oxford UCCE which was formed in 2001. Weenink scored 124 runs in his five matches, with a high score of 72 not out. As a bowler, he took 5 wickets with best figures of 3 for 121. He also made an appearance for Oxford University against Cambridge University in The University Match at Lord's where he was awarded a University of Oxford Cricket Blue.

Weenink also played representative rugby for various Wellington teams and while studying at Oxford he played in the 1999 Varsity Match at Twickenham versus Cambridge University and was also awarded a University of Oxford Rugby Blue.

== Professional career ==
After graduating from Oxford University, Weenink entered into business. After a period as a lawyer in private practise, Weenink was the general counsel and company secretary for Auckland Airport from 2016 until he joined Modica Group in late 2018. Weenink was also a board director of several companies, including Generate KiwiSaver Funds Management, Xceda Financial Services and Enable Networks.

Weenink was CEO of New Zealand Cricket from August 2023 until January 2026. He resigned from the position in December 2025 following differences with the sporting body's board and key cricket stakeholders. On 28 April 2026, Weenink was succeeded by Geoff Allott as CEO of NZ Cricket.
