= Cricket Live Foundation =

New Zealand foundation

The Cricket Live Foundation is a New Zealand based non-profit organisation. The main objective is to bring Cricket to the children of Sri Lanka and India who currently live in underprivileged environments with limited opportunity. The Cricket Live Foundation is currently operating in three centers in Moratuwa, Sri Lanka in partnership with the MJF Foundation, an internally funded Charitable Foundation of Dilmah Tea.

== Alex Reese ==
Alex Reese was playing cricket in India when he had the idea. When the 22-year-old saw the plight of children living in the slums, he wasn't content to be a spectator. He was inspired to help after becoming friends with taxi driver named Lax, who lived in one of the biggest slums in Mumbai and couldn't afford to send his kids to any local academies – which only cost around NZ$10 a month to attend.
