= New Zealand Cricket =

Governing body for professional cricket in New Zealand

- Sport: Cricket
- Jurisdiction: New Zealand
- Abbreviation: NZC
- Founded: 27 December 1894; 131 years ago Christchurch, New Zealand
- Affiliation: International Cricket Council
- Affiliation date: 1926; 100 years ago
- Regional affiliation: East Asia-Pacific
- Affiliation date: 1996; 30 years ago
- Headquarters: Auckland, New Zealand
- Location: Auckland
- President: Lesley Murdoch
- Chairman: Diana Puketapu-Lyndon
- CEO: Geoff Allott
- Sponsor: ANZ, Asahi, Castore, Chemist Warehouse, Dulux, Ford, Genesis Energy, Gillette, G.J. Gardner Homes, KFC, LifeDirect, Powerade, Spark, Tegel

Official website
- www.nzc.nz
- Other key staff: Selector; Sam Wells
- (New Zealand)

New Zealand Cricket, formerly the New Zealand Cricket Council, is the governing body for professional cricket in New Zealand. Cricket is the most popular and highest profile summer sport in New Zealand.

New Zealand Cricket operates the New Zealand cricket team, organising Test tours and One-Day Internationals with other nations. It also organises domestic cricket in New Zealand, including the Plunket Shield first-class competition, The Ford Trophy men's domestic one-day competition, the Hallyburton Johnstone Shield women's domestic one-day competition, as well as the Men's Super Smash and Women's Super Smash domestic Twenty20 competitions.

Geoff Allott is the chief executive officer of New Zealand Cricket. Tom Latham is the current Blackcaps Test captain, succeeding Tim Southee who still represents the team. Sophie Devine is the current White Ferns captain.

== History ==
On 27 December 1894, 12 delegates from around New Zealand met in Christchurch to form the New Zealand Cricket Council. Heathcote Williams was elected the inaugural president, and Charles Smith the secretary. The council's aims were to promote and co-ordinate cricket in New Zealand and to organize international tours from and to New Zealand.

In early December 2025, NZ Cricket CEO Scott Weenink was suspended from his duties as chief executive of the sporting board. Following a disagreement with the sporting body's board and key cricket stakeholders, Weenink resigned from his position as chief executive on 19 December. In April 2026, NZ Cricket named former Test cricketer Geoff Allott as their new CEO, replacing Weenink.

== Cricket development ==
New Zealand Cricket has established a high performance cricket training centre based at Lincoln University. It also operates a grassroots development programme for school children called 'MILO Kiwi Cricket'. John Wright, former NZ opening batsman, was appointed acting high performance manager for NZC in November 2007 before taking up the head coach position in December 2010.

Former Australian coach John Buchanan was appointed as NZC Director of Cricket in May 2011 as the architect of a new high performance programme. He performed a number of key duties including the establishment of clear and consistent national coaching philosophies, the implementation of a talent identification programme and oversaw the Selection Panel.

New Zealand has many private cricket academies. The Bracewell Cricket Academy based at Rathkeale College is one of the largest cricket academies, providing an Overseas Cricket Development Programme, a Pre-Season Coaching Camp and a Festival of Cricket.

There are over 100,000 registered cricketers in New Zealand. By way of comparison, Australia and the UK have around 500,000 each. According to Mark O'Neill, New Zealand's batting coach from 2007 to 2009, the competition at club level in NZ is nowhere near as intense as in Australia.

"In Sydney there are 20 first grade teams, each club has five grades. To get to first grade you've got to be a friggin' good player and once you get there the competition is very, very fierce. Unfortunately it's not the same standard [in NZ]. Competition is everything and the only way the New Zealand guys are going to get that is to play the world's best players."

== Domestic competitions ==
New Zealand Cricket operates the men's, women's and men's and women's Under 19 New Zealand cricket team, organising Test tours and One-Day Internationals with other nations. It also organises domestic and Māori domestic cricket in New Zealand, including the Plunket Shield first-class competition, The Ford Trophy men's domestic one-day competition, the Hallyburton Johnstone Shield women's domestic one-day competition, as well as the Men's Super Smash and Women's Super Smash domestic Twenty20 competitions.

Tournament	Format	Teams	Notes
Plunket Shield	First-Class (4-day)	6 provincial teams	Premier men's first-class competition; Northern Districts won the 2024–25 season.
Ford Trophy	List A (50 overs)	6 provincial teams	Men's one-day competition; Canterbury clinched their 17th title in the 2024–25 season.
Super Smash	T20 (Men's & Women's)	6 provincial teams	Premier men's and women's T20 league; Central Stags and Wellington Blaze were the 2024–25 champions.
Hallyburton Johnstone Shield	50 overs (Women's)	6 provincial teams	Women's 50-over competition; Otago Sparks secured the 2024–25 title.
National Men's Provincial A Matches	Various formats	A teams of provincial teams	Developmental matches for emerging players; featured both one-day and three-day formats.
Women's Under-19 Tournament	50 overs (Women's U-19)	6 provincial teams	Developmental tournament for U-19 female cricketers.
Men's Under-19 Tournament	50 overs (Men's U-19)	6 provincial teams	Developmental tournament for U-19 male cricketers.
Men's Under-17 Tournament	50 overs (Men's U-17)	6 provincial teams	Developmental tournament for U-17 male cricketers.

== Domestic teams ==
=== Men's teams ===
New Zealand Cricket provides competition structures for the following Major Association domestic teams:

- Auckland Aces
- Canterbury (known as Canterbury Kings for Twenty20)
- Central Stags
- Northern Districts (known as Northern Brave for Twenty20)
- Otago Volts
- Wellington Firebirds

=== Women's teams ===
New Zealand Cricket involves the following women's domestic teams:

- Auckland Hearts
- Canterbury Magicians
- Central Hinds
- Northern Districts (known as Northern Brave for Twenty20)
- Otago Sparks
- Wellington Blaze

== Funding ==
New Zealand Cricket derives most of its revenue from the sale of two types of broadcasting rights.

1. Broadcasting rights to home internationals.
2. A share of the broadcasting rights the ICC sells to its tournaments, such as the World Cup.

Host nations pick up all the expenses of touring teams, but get sole access to all broadcast rights and gate receipts.

In November 2007 it was announced that NZC had made a 5-year deal for the broadcasting rights to home internationals for NZ$65.4m with Sony Entertainment Television. The previous four-year deal between NZC and ESPN-Star was for only NZ$14.4m. Part of the 5-fold increase in value is due to the Indian team's tour of NZ in 2009.

Immediately prior to the 2009 Indian tour of NZ the Sunday Star Times reported that "NZ Cricket hits $25m jackpot".

The article claimed that NZ Cricket will get $1 million for each of the 22 days the Indians take the field and that NZ Cricket had insured against loss of income for the sale of TV rights due to bad weather. NZC boss Justin Vaughan also said that a tour by India generates "many times" more income than tours by Australia, South Africa and England and that the Indian tour was worth more to NZC than the payout from the Cricket World Cup, which was around $20m.

The article also states that over the past two years, NZC's income has been around $30m, but this year (2009) Vaughan is hoping to get more than $40 million from broadcast rights, sponsorship and ticket sales.

In 2007, the ICC sold the rights to broadcast the World Cup, the Champions Trophy and the ICC World Twenty20 to ESPN Star Sports until 2015 for US$1 billion. NZC will receive a slice of that.

In November 2017, Star Sports acquired the broadcast and digital rights for New Zealand Cricket for all men's and women's international matches being organised in the country till April 2020 for the Indian subcontinent and Southeast Asia.

== Partnership with USA Cricket (2010) ==
On 19 December 2010, after months of negotiations, New Zealand Cricket announced it had signed a business deal with USACA which would see New Zealand play a certain number of games in the US and also make its players available to participate in any Twenty20 leagues in the USA. A new company was created called Cricket Holdings America LLC. This new company will hold the rights to hold Twenty20 leagues within the United States. New Zealand Cricket chief Justin Vaughan said he was happy with the development because New Zealand was a small market and to exploit a market will allow New Zealand Cricket to secure its funding in the long-term and will also allow cricket to develop popularity as a game in the United States of America.

== See also ==
- Cricket in New Zealand
- New Zealand Cricket Awards
- New Zealand national cricket team
