= List of Somerset County Cricket Club players =

This is a list in alphabetical order of cricketers who have played for Somerset County Cricket Club in top-class matches from 1882 to 1885 inclusive and then continuously from 1891. Founded in 1875, the club held minor status until 1881 and again from 1886 to 1890. Somerset is classified as an important team by substantial sources from 1882 to 1885 and from 1891 to 1894; classified as an official first-class team from 1895 by Marylebone Cricket Club (MCC) and the County Championship clubs; classified as a List A team since the beginning of limited overs cricket in 1963. and classified as a first-class Twenty20 team since the inauguration of the Twenty20 Cup in 2003. Note that there is disagreement in the sources about the status of certain Somerset matches before 1882.

The details are the player's usual name followed by the years in which he was active as a Somerset player. Seasons given are first and last seasons; the player did not necessarily play in all the intervening seasons. Note that many players represented other top-class teams besides Somerset. Current players are shown as active to the latest season in which they played for the club. The list excludes Second XI and other players who did not play for the club's first team; and players whose first team appearances were in minor matches only.

For more detailed information about the Somerset players in each of the three main forms of top-class cricket, see the following:

- List of Somerset County Cricket Club players with 100 or more first-class or List A appearances
- List of Somerset County Cricket Club List A players
- List of Somerset County Cricket Club Twenty20 players

As of 23 August 2026

== A ==
- Aamer Sohail (2001): Aamer Sohail
- Abdur Rehman (2012–2015): Abdur Rehman
- Tom Abell (2014–2026): TB Abell
- Edmund Adams (1935): EJ Adams
- Kasey Aldridge (2021–2025): KL Aldridge
- Charlie Alison (1902–1905): CH Alison
- Jim Allenby (2015–2017): J Allenby
- Bill Alley (1957–1968): WE Alley
- Granny Alston (1933): HNE Alston
- Joe Ambler (1883): J Ambler
- Stanley Amor (1908–1930): SL Amor
- Corey Anderson (2017–2018) CJ Anderson
- Gareth Andrew (2003–2007): GM Andrew
- Bill Andrews (1930–1947): WHR Andrews
- Les Angell (1947–1956): FL Angell
- Richard Ashley (1932): R Ashley
- Colin Atkinson (1960–1967): CRM Atkinson
- Graham Atkinson (1954–1966): G Atkinson
- Jon Atkinson (1985–1990): JCM Atkinson
- Azhar Ali (2018–2021): Azhar Ali

== B ==
- Babar Azam (2019–2020): Babar Azam
- Abbas Ali Baig (1960–1962): AA Baig
- Paul Bail (1985–1986): PAC Bail
- Alfred Bailey (1900–1911): AE Bailey
- Cyril Baily (1902): CAH Baily
- Frederick Baitup (1924): FH Baitup
- M. P. Bajana (1912–1920): MP Bajana
- Edward Baker (1921): EC Baker
- John Baker (1952–1954): J Baker
- Sonny Baker (2021–2024): S Baker
- William Baldock (1920–1936): WF Baldock
- Edgar Ball (1914): EC Ball
- Jake Ball (2024–2026): JT Ball
- Cameron Bancroft (2023): CT Bancroft
- Cecil Banes-Walker (1914): FC Banes-Walker
- Omari Banks (2008–2009): OAC Banks
- Percy Banks (1903–1908): PD Banks
- Tom Banton (2017–2026): T Banton
- Charles Barlow (1925–1926): CS Barlow
- George Barne (1904): GD Barne
- John Barnwell (1935–1948): CJP Barnwell
- Michael Barnwell (1967–1968): LML Barnwell
- Alexander Barrett (1896): AG Barrett
- Alex Barrow (2011–2016): AWR Barrow
- Ezra Bartlett (1894–1895): EW Bartlett
- George Bartlett (2017–2023): GA Bartlett
- Ricky Bartlett (1986–1992): RJ Bartlett
- Terry Barwell (1959–1968): TI Barwell
- Shoaib Bashir (2023–2024): S Bashir
- Edward Bastard (1883–1885): EW Bastard
- Michael Bates (2015): MD Bates
- Jeremy Batty (1995–1996): JD Batty
- David Beal (1991): D Beal
- Leslie Bean (1929): LH Bean
- Charles Bennett (1902): CO Bennett
- Michael Bennett (1928–1939): GM Bennett
- Charles Bernard (1896–1901): CA Bernard
- William Berry (1926): WE Berry
- Len Beel (1969): WJL Beel
- Dom Bess (2016–2023): DM Bess
- Arthur Bezer (1914): A Bezer
- Ken Biddulph (1955–1961): KD Biddulph
- Paul Bird (1994): PJ Bird
- Bert Bisgood (1907–1921): BL Bisgood
- Eustace Bisgood (1909): EDP Bisgood
- Charles Bishop (1920–1921): CF Bishop
- Ian Bishop (1996): IE Bishop
- Ian Blackwell (2000–2008): ID Blackwell
- Guy Blaikie (1921–1923): KG Blaikie
- Algernon Bligh (1922–1926): AS Bligh
- Rayner Blitz (1986): RJ Blitz
- Frank Bolus (1893–1894): F Bolus
- Stephen Booth (1983–1985): SC Booth
- Ian Botham (1973–1986): IT Botham
- Nicholas Boulton (1997): NR Boulton
- Gerald Boundy (1926–1930): GO Boundy
- Alfred Bowerman (1900–1905): AJ Bowerman
- Peter Bowler (1995–2004): PD Bowler
- Charles Bowring (1913): CJ Bowring
- Len Braund (1899–1920): LC Braund
- Dennis Breakwell (1973–1984): D Breakwell
- Jimmy Bridges (1911–1929): JJ Bridges
- Ben Brocklehurst (1952–1954): BG Brocklehurst
- Dickie Brooks (1968): RA Brooks
- Jack Brooks (2019–2023): JA Brooks
- Colin Brown (1902–1905): CE Brown
- Leigh Brownlee (1902): LD Brownlee
- James Bryant (2003): JDC Bryant
- Eric Bryant (1958–1960): LE Bryant
- Michael Bryant (1982): M Bryant
- Bill Buck (1969): WD Buck
- Paddy Bucklan (1948): JE Bucklan
- John Bucknell (1895–1905): J Bucknell
- Matthew Bulbeck (1998–2002): MPL Bulbeck
- William Bunce (1936–1937): WN Bunce
- Graham Burgess (1966–1980): GI Burgess
- William Burgess (1921–1922): WA Burgess
- James Burke (2012–2014): JE Burke
- Mike Burns (1997–2005): M Burns
- Neil Burns (1987–1993): ND Burns
- George Burrington (1901–1902): G Burrington
- Humphrey Burrington (1903–1905): HS Burrington
- George Burrough (1936): GB Burrough
- Dickie Burrough (1927–1947): HD Burrough
- William Burrough (1906): WG Burrough
- Bertie Buse (1929–1953): HFT Buse
- George Butler (1920): GS Butler
- Cecil Buttle (1926–1928): CFD Buttle
- Jos Buttler (2009–2013): JC Buttler
- Eddie Byrom (2017–2021): EJ Byrom

== C ==
- Andrew Caddick (1990–2009): AR Caddick
- Bill Caesar (1946): WC Caesar
- John Cameron (1932–1947): JH Cameron
- Curtis Campher (2023): C Campher
- Charlie Carter (1968–1969): CEP Carter
- Tom Cartwright (1970–1976): TW Cartwright
- Box Case (1925–1935): CCC Case
- Charlie Cassell (2024): CAA Cassell
- Fred Castle (1946–1949): F Castle
- John Challen (1884–1899): JB Challen
- Greg Chappell (1968–1969): GS Chappell
- Piyush Chawla (2013): PP Chawla
- Harry Chidgey (1900–1921): H Chidgey
- Ben Church (2026): BJ Church (Note: Church made his List A debut in July 2026 against Nottinghamshire. He had previously played for the Somerset Second XI and the Somerset Academy.)
- Albert Clapp (1885–1895): AE Clapp
- Bob Clapp (1972–1977): RJ Clapp
- Seymour Clark (1930): AHS Clark
- Vince Clarke (1994): VP Clarke
- Tony Clarkson (1966–1971): A Clarkson
- Geoff Clayton (1965–1967): G Clayton
- Matthew Cleal (1988–1991): MW Cleal
- Brian Close (1971–1977): DB Close
- Terence Cole (1922): TGO Cole
- Edward Collings (1921–1925): EP Collings
- Boris Collingwood (1953): BE Collingwood
- Edward Compton (1894–1907): ED Compton
- Nick Compton (2010–2014): NRD Compton
- Jack Conibere (1950): WJ Conibere
- Johnny Connell (2026): JM Connell (Note: Connell made his List A debut in July 2026 against Nottinghamshire. He had previously played for Berkshire, the Essex Second XI, the Hampshire Second XI and the Sussex Second XI.)
- Ulick Considine (1919–1935): SGU Considine
- Devon Conway (2021): DP Conway
- Jimmy Cook (1989–1991): SJ Cook
- William Cookson (1882): WW Cookson
- Robert Coombs (1985–1986): RVJ Coombs
- Miles Coope (1947–1949): M Coope
- Richard Cooper (1972): RC Cooper
- Tom Cooper (2015): TLW Cooper
- Andy Cottam (1992–1996): AC Cottam
- Geof Courtenay (1947): GWL Courtenay
- Peter Courtenay (1934): PJS Courtenay
- David Cox (1969): DW Cox
- Jamie Cox (1999–2004): J Cox
- Fred Coyle (1903–1905): FT Coyle
- Beaumont Cranfield (1897–1908): B Cranfield
- Lionel Cranfield (1906): LL Cranfield
- Humphrey Critchley-Salmonson (1910–1928): HSR Critchley-Salmonson
- Alfred Crowder (1908): AJ Crowder
- Martin Crowe (1984–1988): MD Crowe
- Thomas Crump (1885): T Crump
- Dan Cullen (2006): DJ Cullen
- Alec Cunningham (1930): AGG Cunningham
- John Currie (1953): JD Currie

== D ==
- John Daniell (1898–1927): J Daniell
- Clive Davey (1953–1955): CF Davey
- Josh Davey (2015–2025): JH Davey
- Philip Davey (1934–1937): PJ Davey
- Ryan Davies (2016–2017): RC Davies
- Steven Davies (2017–2023): SM Davies
- Mark Davis (1982–1987): MR Davis
- Ken Day (1950–1956): FGK Day
- William Dean (1952): WF Dean
- Charles Deane (1907–1913): CG Deane
- Zander de Bruyn (2008–2010): Z de Bruyn
- Marchant de Lange (2021–2022): M de Lange
- Peter Denning (1969–1984): PW Denning
- David Deshon (1947–1953): DPT Deshon
- Adam Dibble (2011–2015): AJ Dibble
- Tom Dickinson (1957): TE Dickinson
- Sean Dickson (2023–2025): SR Dickson
- Mathew Dimond (1994–1997): M Dimond
- George Dockrell (2010/11–2014): GH Dockrell
- Bradleigh Donelan (1994): BTP Donelan
- David Doughty (1963–1964): DG Doughty
- Robert Draper (1925–1929): RW Draper
- Colin Dredge (1976–1988): CH Dredge
- George Drissell (2021): GS Drissell
- Charles Dunlop (1892–1905): CE Dunlop
- Wes Durston (2002–2009): WJ Durston
- Keith Dutch (2001–2004): KP Dutch

== E ==
- Guy Earle (1922–1931): GF Earle
- Michael Earls-Davis (1950): MRG Earls-Davis
- Edward Ebdon (1891–1898): EW Ebdon
- John Ebdon (1898): JF Ebdon
- Percy Ebdon (1894): PJ Ebdon
- Simon Ecclestone (1994–1998): SC Ecclestone
- Neil Edwards (2002–2009): NJ Edwards
- Peter Eele (1958–1965): PJ Eele
- Dean Elgar (2013–2017): D Elgar
- Sam Ellis (1902): SGA Ellis
- Alfred Evans (1882–1884): AH Evans
- David Evans (1894–1902): DL Evans
- Ernest Evans (1891): ED Evans
- David Evans (1953): GHD Evans
- Nick Evans (1976): NJ Evans
- Percival Ewens (1923–1926): PC Ewens

== F ==
- Cuthbert Fairbanks-Smith (1921): C Fairbanks-Smith
- Ernest Falck (1935–1936): ED Falck
- Harold Fear (1934): HP Fear
- Nigel Felton (1982–1988): NA Felton
- Simon Ferguson (1985): SAR Ferguson
- Geoffrey Fletcher (1939): GE Fletcher
- Iain Fletcher (1991–1994): I Fletcher
- Nick Folland (1992–1994): NA Folland
- Humphrey Forman (1910): H Forman
- Daren Foster (1984–1989): DJ Foster
- Arnold Fothergill (1882–1884): AJ Fothergill
- Gerald Fowler (1891–1903): G Fowler
- Bill Fowler (1882–1884): WH Fowler
- Henry Fox (1882): H Fox
- Herbert Fox (1882–1891): HF Fox
- Philip Foy (1919–1930): PA Foy
- John Francis (2004–2008): JD Francis
- Simon Francis (2002–2006): SRG Francis
- Thomas Francis (1921–1925): TES Francis
- John Frazer (1921): JE Frazer
- Arthur Freeman (1905): AEB Freeman
- Philip Fussell (1953–1956): PH Fussell

== G ==
- Jim Galley (1969): JM Galley
- Herbert Gamlin (1895–1896): HT Gamlin
- Trevor Gard (1976–1989): T Gard
- Joel Garner (1977–1986): J Garner
- Tommy Garnett (1935–1939): TR Garnett
- Hubert Garrett (1913): HF Garrett
- Sunil Gavaskar (1980): SM Gavaskar
- Leslie Gay (1894): LH Gay
- Chris Gayle (2015–2016): CH Gayle
- Carl Gazzard (2002–2009): CM Gazzard
- Roy Genders (1949): WR Genders
- Ronald Gerrard (1935): RA Gerrard
- Arthur Gibbs (1919–1920): AHD Gibbs
- Joseph Gibbs (1891–1894): JA Gibbs
- Arthur Gibson (1919): AK Gibson
- Gary Gilder (2003): GM Gilder
- George Gill (1897–1902): GC Gill
- Harold Gimblett (1935–1954): H Gimblett
- Cuthbert Godwin (1926): CB Godwin
- Lewis Goldsworthy (2020–2026): LP Goldsworthy
- Brian Gomm (1939): BA Gomm
- Edward Goodland (1908–1909): ES Goodland
- Hugh Gore (1980): HEI Gore
- Peter Graham (1948): PAO Graham
- Edward Grant (1899–1901): E Grant
- David Graveney (1991): DA Graveney
- Ben Green (2016–2025): BGF Green
- Cleveland Greenway (1882): CE Greenway
- Leonard Greenwood (1920): LW Greenwood
- Chris Greetham (1957–1966): CHM Greetham
- Thomas Gregg (1883): T Gregg
- Lewis Gregory (2010–2026): L Gregory
- Ernest Greswell (1903–1910): EA Greswell
- Bill Greswell (1908–1930): WT Greswell
- Harry Griffin (1898–1899): H Griffin
- Tim Groenewald (2014–2019): TD Groenewald
- Jamie Grove (2000–2001): JO Grove
- Mike Groves (1965): MGM Groves
- David Gurr (1976–1979): DR Gurr

== H ==
- Edward Hack (1937): EJ Hack
- Calum Haggett (2010/11): CJ Haggett
- Walter Hale (1892): WH Hale
- Ernest Hall (1884–1885): HE Hall
- Geoff Hall (1961–1965): GH Hall
- Henry Hall (1882–1885): HGH Hall
- Tom Hall (1953–1954): TA Hall
- Jeremy Hallett (1990–1995): JC Hallett
- Montague Hambling (1920–1927): ML Hambling
- Ralph Hancock (1907–1914): RE Hancock
- William Hancock (1892): WI Hancock
- Michael Hanna (1951–1954): M Hanna
- John Harcombe (1905–1919): JD Harcombe
- Neil Hancock (2004): ND Hancock
- Richard Harden (1985–1998): RJ Harden
- Jack Harding (2022): JC Harding (Note: Harding made his List A debut in August 2022 against Surrey. He had previously played for the Somerset Second XI and the Somerset Academy.)
- Percy Hardy (1902–1914): FP Hardy
- Jon Hardy (1986–1990): J Hardy
- Norman Hardy (1912–1921): N Hardy
- Mark Harman (1986–1987): MD Harman
- John Harris (1952–1959) JH Harris
- Eustace Hart (1930): EJH Hart
- Laurie Hawkins (1928–1937): LC Hawkins
- Andy Hayhurst (1990–1996): AN Hayhurst
- Richard Hayward (1985): RE Hayward
- Esme Haywood (1925–1927): ETLR Haywood
- Horace Hazell (1929–1952): HC Hazell
- Coote Hedley (1892–1904): WC Hedley
- John Hellard (1907–1910): JA Hellard
- Matt Henry (2023–2025): MJ Henry
- Mervyn Herbert (1903–1924): MRHM Herbert
- Jordan Hermann (2026): JG Hermann
- Fred Herting (1960): FJ Herting
- Steven Herzberg (1997): S Herzberg
- Herbie Hewett (1884–1893): HT Hewett
- Joe Heywood (2024): JP Heywood
- Cecil Hickley (1898–1899): CS Hickley
- James Hildreth (2003–2022): JC Hildreth
- Lyonel Hildyard (1882–1883): LD Hildyard
- Eric Hill (1947–1951): E Hill
- Eustace Hill (1898–1901): ET Hill
- Evelyn Hill (1926–1929): EVL Hill
- Fin Hill (2023–2025): FJ Hill (Note: Hill made his List A debut in August 2023 against Durham. He had previously played for the Somerset Second XI, the Somerset Academy and Devon.)
- Francis Hill (1882): F Hill
- Maurice Hill (1970–1971): M Hill
- Mervyn Hill (1921–1932): ML Hill
- Richard Hill (1882): RE Hill
- Vernon Hill (1891–1912): VT Hill
- Jim Hilton (1954–1957): J Hilton
- Harold Hippisley (1909–1913): HE Hippisley
- Gerard Hodgkinson (1904–1911): GW Hodgkinson
- Piran Holloway (1994–2003): PCL Holloway
- Trevor Holmes (1969): JT Holmes
- Ernest Holt (1930): EG Holt
- Hugo Hood (1935): EHM Hood
- Arthur Hook (1897–1906): AJ Hook
- John Hook (1975): JS Hook
- Philip Hope (1914–1925): PP Hope
- Adam Hose (2015–2017): AJ Hose
- Frederick Hotham (1882): FW Hotham
- Biron House (1912–1914): BH House
- David Hughes (1955): DG Hughes
- Charles Hulls (1885): CH Hulls
- Henry Humphries (1906): HH Humphries
- George Hunt (1921–1931): GE Hunt
- George Hunt (1898): GR Hunt
- Bert Hunt (1936): A Hunt
- Thos Hunt (2004): TA Hunt
- Gemaal Hussain (2010/11–2013): GM Hussain
- Bruce Hylton-Stewart (1912–1914): BD Hylton-Stewart
- Bill Hyman (1900–1914): W Hyman

== I ==
- Imam-ul-Haq (2022): Imam-ul-Haq
- Reggie Ingle (1923–1939): RA Ingle
- Colin Ingram (2014): CA Ingram
- Peter Ingram (1910): PR Ingram
- Frank Irish (1950): AF Irish

== J ==
- John Jackson (1920): JAS Jackson
- Paul Jarvis (1999–2002): PW Jarvis
- Sanath Jayasuriya (2005): ST Jayasuriya
- Mahela Jayawardene (2016): DPMD Jayawardene
- Frederick Jennings (1895): FLB Jennings
- Keith Jennings (1975–1981): KF Jennings
- William Jewell (1884): WJ Jewell
- Peter Randall Johnson (1901–1927): PR Johnson
- Richard Johnson (2001–2006): RL Johnson
- Adrian Jones (1987–1990): AN Jones
- Allan Jones (1970–1975): AA Jones
- Andrew Jones (1985): AP Jones
- Chris Jones (2010–2014): CR Jones
- Trevor Jones (1938–1948): ATM Jones
- Ian Jones (1999–2001): I Jones
- James Jones (1922–1923): JM Jones
- Steffan Jones (1997–2008): PS Jones
- Frank Joy (1909–1912): FDH Joy
- George Jupp (1901–1907): GW Jupp

== K ==
- Murali Kartik (2010–2011): M Kartik
- Geoff Keith (1959–1961): GL Keith
- Wilfrid Kempe (1919): WN Kempe
- Gregor Kennis (1998–2000): GJ Kennis
- Jason Kerr (1993–2001): JID Kerr
- Roy Kerslake (1962–1968): RC Kerslake
- Henry Kettlewell (1899): HW Kettlewell
- Laurence Key (1919–1922): LH Key
- Khan Mohammad (1951): Khan Mohammad
- Craig Kieswetter (2007–2014): C Kieswetter
- Ken Kinnersley (1932–1938): KC Kinnersley
- Steve Kirby (2010/11–2013): SP Kirby
- Mervyn Kitchen (1960–1979): MJ Kitchen
- David Kitson (1952–1954): DL Kitson
- Tom Kohler-Cadmore (2023–2026): T Kohler-Cadmore

== L ==
- Danny Lamb (2023): DJ Lamb
- George Lambert (1960): GEE Lambert
- Theo Lamey (2026): T Lamey (Note: Lamey made his List A debut in July 2026 against Kent. He had previously played for the Somerset Second XI and the Somerset Academy.)
- Tom Lammonby (2019–2026): TA Lammonby
- George Langdale (1946–1949): GR Langdale
- Justin Langer (2006–2009/10): JL Langer
- Charl Langeveldt (2005): CK Langeveldt
- Brian Langford (1953–1974): BA Langford
- JT Langridge (2023–2026): JT Langridge
- Aaron Laraman (2003–2005): AW Laraman
- Mike Latham (1961–1962): ME Latham
- Mark Lathwell (1990–2001): MN Lathwell
- Johnny Lawrence (1946–1955): J Lawrence
- Miles Lawrence (1959–1961): JM Lawrence
- Cecil Leach (1924–1928): ELC Leach
- Jack Leach (2012–2026): MJ Leach
- Michael Leask (2016–2017): MA Leask
- Edwin Leat (1908–1910): EJ Leat
- Fred Lee (1902–1907): FM Lee
- Fred Lee (1925–1927): FG Lee
- Frank Lee (1929–1947): FS Lee
- Jack Lee (1925–1936): JW Lee
- Shane Lee (1996): S Lee
- Roland Lefebvre (1990–1992): RP Lefebvre
- Ned Leonard (2021–2024): EO Leonard
- Robin Lett (2006): RJH Lett
- Richard Levi (2012): RE Levi
- Talbot Lewis (1899–1914): AE Lewis
- George Lillington (1883–1885): GG Lillington
- Vincent Lindo (1963): CV Lindo
- Anthony Ling (1939): AJP Ling
- Keith Linney (1931–1937): CK Linney
- Jeremy Lloyds (1979–1984): JW Lloyds
- Bryan Lobb (1955–1969): B Lobb
- Edward Lock (1891–1893): EJ Lock
- Walter Lock (1928): WG Lock
- Ian Lomax (1962): IR Lomax
- Geoff Lomax (1954–1962): JG Lomax
- Bunty Longrigg (1925–1947): EF Longrigg
- Tom Lowry (1921–1924): TC Lowry
- Wally Luckes (1924–1949): WT Luckes
- Charles Ross Lyall (1911): CR Lyall
- Dar Lyon (1920–1938): MD Lyon

== M ==
- Jack MacBryan (1911–1931): JCW MacBryan
- Harry MacDonald (1896): HLS MacDonald
- Alastair MacDonald Watson (1932–1933): A MacDonald Watson
- Stuart MacGill (1997): SCG MacGill
- Ken MacLeay (1991–1992): KH MacLeay
- John Madden-Gaskell (1928–1930): JCP Madden-Gaskell
- Sajid Mahmood (2012): SI Mahmood
- Saqib Mahmood (1992): S Mahmood
- Vivian Majendie (1907–1910): VHB Majendie
- Lionel Major (1903): LH Major
- Neil Mallender (1987–1994): NA Mallender
- Fred Marks (1884): FD Marks
- Vic Marks (1975–1989): VJ Marks
- Edward Marsh (1885): EC Marsh
- Reginald Marsh (1928–1934): RB Marsh
- Alan Marshall (1914–1931): AJ Marshall
- Leslie Marshall (1913–1931): LP Marshall
- John Martin (1964–1965): JD Martin
- Henry Martyn (1901–1908): H Martyn
- William Massey (1882): WM Massey
- James Maxwell (1906–1908): J Maxwell
- Charles Mayo (1928): CTW Mayo
- Colin McCool (1956–1960): CL McCool
- Russ McCool (1982): RJ McCool
- Neil McKenzie (2007): ND McKenzie
- Douglas McLean (1896): DH McLean
- Nixon McLean (2003–2005): NAM McLean
- John McMahon (1954–1957): JWJ McMahon
- Peter McRae (1936–1939): FM McRae
- Ajantha Mendis (2011): BAW Mendis
- Riley Meredith (2024–2026): RP Meredith
- Patrick Mermagen (1930): PHF Mermagen
- Craig Meschede (2010/11–2014): CAJ Meschede
- Jack Meyer (1936–1949): RJO Meyer
- George Mirehouse (1884–1885): GT Mirehouse
- Colin Mitchell (1952–1954): CG Mitchell
- Mandy Mitchell-Innes (1931–1949): NS Mitchell-Innes
- Jack Mitton (1920): J Mitton
- Paul Molyneux (1937): PSM Molyneux
- Hugh Montgomery (1901–1909): HF Montgomery
- Bill Montgomery (1905–1907): W Montgomery
- Osbert Mordaunt (1905–1910): OC Mordaunt
- Bert Morgan (1909–1910): BF Morgan
- Albie Morkel (2012): JA Morkel
- John Morrison (1920): JSF Morrison
- Hallam Moseley (1971–1982): HR Moseley
- Michael Munday (2005–2010): MK Munday
- Marwood Munden (1908): MM Munden
- Ernest Murdock (1885): EG Murdock
- Mushtaq Ahmed (1993–1998): Mushtaq Ahmed
- Robert Mutch (2012): RG Mutch
- Johann Myburgh (2014–2018): JG Myburgh

== N ==
- Dirk Nannes (2014): DP Nannes
- Hitendra Narayan (1909–1910): KHS Narayan
- George Newport (1902–1904): GB Newport
- Arthur Newton (1891–1914): AE Newton
- Stephen Newton (1882–1884): SC Newton
- Henry Nicholls (2026): HM Nicholls
- George Nichols (1891–1899): GB Nichols
- Albert North (1903–1909): AEC North
- Edward Northway (1925–1926): EG Northway
- Reginald Northway (1929–1933): RP Northway

== O ==
- Kevin O'Brien (2012): KJ O'Brien
- Alfie Ogborne (2022–2026): ARJ Ogborne
- Geoffrey Ogilvy (1936): GL Ogilvy
- Kerry O'Keeffe (1971–1972): KJ O'Keeffe
- Martin Olive (1977–1981): M Olive
- Richard Ollis (1981–1985): RL Ollis
- Craig Overton (2012–2026): C Overton
- Jamie Overton (2012–2020): J Overton

== P ==
- Edward Page (1885): EW Page
- Lionel Palairet (1891–1909): LCH Palairet
- Richard Palairet (1891–1902): RCN Palairet
- Gary Palmer (1982–1989): GV Palmer
- Ken Palmer (1955–1969): KE Palmer
- Roy Palmer (1965–1970): R Palmer
- Arthur Pape (1912): AAB Pape
- James Parfitt (1883–1885): JJA Parfitt
- Jim Parks (1973–1976): JM Parks
- Keith Parsons (1993–2007): KA Parsons
- Kevin Parsons (1992–1993): KJ Parsons
- Michael Parsons (2002–2005): M Parsons
- Arthur Paterson (1903): AWS Paterson
- Edmund Paul (1907–1910): EP Paul
- Richard Paull (1963–1964): RK Paul
- Andrew Payne (1992–1994): A Payne
- George Peake (1885): GEF Peake
- Allan Pearse (1936–1938): AA Pearse
- Tony Pearson (1961–1963): AJG Pearson
- Anthony Pelham (1933): AG Pelham
- Savin Perera (2026): SD Perera
- Horace Perry (1927): HT Perry
- Richard Peters (1946): RC Peters
- Alviro Petersen (2013–2014): AN Petersen
- Vernon Philander (2012): VD Philander
- Ben Phillips (2008–2010): BJ Phillips
- Frank Phillips (1897–1911): FA Phillips
- Lewis Pickles (1955–1958): L Pickles
- Adrian Pierson (1998–2000): ARK Pierson
- Kieron Pollard (2010–2011): KA Pollard
- Dudley Pontifex (1882): DD Pontifex
- Ricky Ponting (2004): RT Ponting
- Nigel Popplewell (1979–1985): NFM Popplewell
- Robert Porch (1895–1910): RB Porch
- Albert Porter (1883): AL Porter
- Francis Portman (1897–1899): FJ Portman
- Frederick Potbury (1882): FJ Potbury
- Louis Powell (1927–1938): LS Powell
- Frederic Poynton (1891–1896): FJ Poynton
- Massey Poyntz (1905–1919): ESM Poyntz
- Hugh Poyntz (1904–1921): HS Poyntz
- Frederick Pratten (1930–1931): FL Pratten
- Migael Pretorius (2024–2026): M Pretorius
- Bill Price (1901): WL Price
- James Priddy (1933–1939): J Priddy
- Nick Pringle (1986–1991): NJ Pringle
- Harry Pruett (1921–1926): HG Pruett

== R ==
- Octavius Radcliffe (1885): OG Radcliffe
- Robert Ramsay (1882): RC Ramsay
- Brett Randell (2024): BG Randell
- Jim Redman (1948–1953): J Redman
- Francis Reed (1882–1884): F Reed
- Farrant Reed (1882–1885): HF Reed
- Dermot Reeve (1998): DA Reeve
- James Regan (2012): JA Regan
- Perry Rendell (1990): PJ Rendell
- Matt Renshaw (2018–2024): MT Renshaw
- James Rew (2021–2026): JEK Rew
- Thomas Rew (2025–2026): THS Rew
- Viv Richards (1974–1986): IVA Richards
- Alfred Richardson (1895): AG Richardson
- Tom Richardson (1905): T Richardson
- Arthur Ricketts (1936): AJ Ricketts
- Dudley Rippon (1914–1920): ADE Rippon
- Sydney Rippon (1914–1937): AES Rippon
- Frederick Roberts (1899): FC Roberts
- John Roberts (1969–1970): JK Roberts
- Kian Roberts (2025–2026): KJT Roberts (Note: Roberts made his List A debut in August 2025 against Lancashire. He had previously played for Cornwall, the Somerset Second XI and the Somerset Academy.)
- R. C. Robertson-Glasgow (1920–1935): RC Robertson-Glasgow
- Crescens Robinson (1885–1896): CJ Robinson
- Ellis Robinson (1950–1952): EP Robinson
- Peter Robinson (1965–1977): PJ Robinson
- Ray Robinson (1964): RT Robinson
- Theodore Robinson (1884–1894): T Robinson
- Ernie Robson (1895–1923): E Robson
- Brian Roe (1957–1966): WN Roe
- Peter Roebuck (1974–1991): PM Roebuck
- Chris Rogers (2016): CJL Rogers
- Stuart Rogers (1948–1953): SS Rogers
- Luke Ronchi (2015): L Ronchi
- Brian Rose (1969–1987): BC Rose
- Graham Rose (1987–2002): GD Rose
- Hamilton Ross (1883–1891): H Ross
- Tim Rouse (2016–2017): TD Rouse
- Rilee Rossouw (2022): RR Rossouw
- George Rowdon (1936): GH Rowdon
- Fred Rumsey (1963–1968): FE Rumsey
- Neil Russom (1980–1983): N Russom

== S ==
- John Sainsbury (1951): JP Sainsbury
- Ted Sainsbury (1882–1885): E Sainsbury
- Sajid Khan (2022): Sajid Khan
- Ollie Sale (2016–2022): ORT Sale
- Daniel Sams (2026): DR Sams
- Oswald Samson (1900–1913): OM Samson
- Arthur Sanders (1919): AT Sanders
- Henry Saunders (1911–1922): HW Saunders
- Donald Scott (1936): DE Scott
- George Scott (2022): GFB Scott
- Henry Scott (1882): H Scott
- Tim Scriven (1988–1989): TJA Scriven
- Jake Seamer (1932–1948): JW Seamer
- Arthur Sellick (1905): AS Sellick
- Richard Selwyn Payne (1906): RBF Selwyn Payne
- Josh Shaw (2026): J Shaw
- Kevin Shine (1996–1998): KJ Shine
- Alan Shirreff (1958): AC Shirreff
- Shoaib Akhtar (2001): Shoaib Akhtar
- Ernest Shorrocks (1905): E Shorrocks
- Walter Shuldham (1914–1924): WFQ Shuldham
- Peter Siddle (2022–2023): PM Siddle
- Dennis Silk (1956–1960): DRW Silk
- Richard Sladdin (1997): RW Sladdin
- Phil Slocombe (1975–1983): PA Slocombe
- William Sloman (1895–1896): WH Sloman
- Will Smeed (2020–2026): WCF Smeed
- Douglas Smith (1896–1898): DJ Smith
- Frederick Smith (1884–1885): FAL Smith
- Graeme Smith (2005): GC Smith
- Roy Smith (1949–1955): R Smith
- William Smith (1895–1898): WRR Smith
- Richard Snell (1992): RP Snell
- Steve Snell (2011–2012): SD Snell
- Ish Sodhi (2023): IS Sodhi
- Sohail Tanvir (2015): Sohail Tanvir
- Richard Southcombe (1936–1937): R Southcombe
- Albert Southwood (1911–1913): AHH Southwood
- Thomas Spencer (1891–1893): T Spencer
- Trevor Spring (1909–1910): TC Spring
- Edward Spurway (1885–1898): EP Spurway
- Francis Spurway (1920–1929): FE Spurway
- Michael Spurway (1929): MV Spurway
- Robert Spurway (1893–1898): RP Spurway
- Sam Spurway (2005–2007): SHP Spurway
- Richard Stanbury (1935–1936): RVM Stanbury
- Edward Stanley (1884): E Stanley
- Henry Stanley (1894–1899): HT Stanley
- John Stenton (1953): JD Stenton
- Harold Stephenson (1948–1964): HW Stephenson
- David Stiff (2008–2010): DA Stiff
- Andrew Strauss (2011): AJ Strauss
- Montague Sturt (1896–1910): MAS Sturt
- Haydn Sully (1959–1963): H Sully
- Royston Sully (1985): RCJ Sully
- Arul Suppiah (2002–2013): AV Suppiah
- Andy Sutton (2012): AP Sutton
- Leonard Sutton (1909–1912): LCL Sutton
- Luke Sutton (1997–1998): LD Sutton
- Tony Sutton (1948): MA Sutton
- Ian Swallow (1990–1991): IG Swallow
- Harry Swayne (1894): HW Swayne
- Charles Sweet (1882–1883): CFL Sweet

== T ==
- Ernest Tandy (1904–1905): EN Tandy
- Hugh Tapsfield (1892): HA Tapsfield
- Harry Tate (1882): HG Tate
- Walter Tate (1882): WWG Tate
- Chris Tavaré (1989–1993): CJ Tavaré
- Charles Taylor (1910–1911): CJ Taylor
- Derek Taylor (1970–1982): DJS Taylor
- Jerome Taylor (2018–2019): JE Taylor
- Nick Taylor (1986): NS Taylor
- Francis Terry (1882–1885): FW Terry
- James Theedom (2025–2026): JM Theedom (Note: Theedom made his List A debut in August 2025 against Yorkshire. He had previously played for Devon, the Somerset Second XI and the Somerset Academy.)
- Alfonso Thomas (2008–2015): AC Thomas
- George Thomas (2021–2024): GW Thomas
- John Thomas (1901–1905): J Thomas
- Josh Thomas (2022–2026): JF Thomas
- Wyndham Thomas (1928): WR Thomas
- Alpin Thomson (1922–1923): AE Thomson
- Elliot Tillard (1912): ED Tillard
- Montagu Toller (1897): MH Toller
- Gerry Tordoff (1950–1955): GG Tordoff
- Gareth Townsend (1990–1992): GTJ Townsend
- John Trask (1884–1895): JE Trask
- William Trask (1882–1900): W Trask
- Peter Trego (2000–2019): PD Trego
- Maurice Tremlett (1947–1960): MF Tremlett
- Marcus Trescothick (1993–2019): ME Trescothick
- Alfred Trestrail (1905): AEY Trestrail
- Graham Tripp (1955–1959): GM Tripp
- Ben Trott (1997–1998): BJ Trott
- Harvey Trump (1988–1997): HRJ Trump
- Joseph Tucker (2000–2001): JP Tucker
- Hervey Tudway (1910): HRC Tudway
- Mark Turner (2007–2010): ML Turner
- Murray Turner (1984–1986): MS Turner
- Robert Turner (1991–2005): RJ Turner
- Simon Turner (1984–1985): SJ Turner
- Ted Tyler (1891–1907): EJ Tyler

== U ==
- Andrew Umeed (2022–2025): ARI Umeed
- Paul Unwin (1989): PD Unwin

== V ==
- Roelof van der Merwe (2011–2024): RE van der Merwe
- Paul van Meekeren (2016–2018): PA van Meekeren
- Andre van Troost (1991–1998): AP van Troost
- Percy Vasey (1913): PW Vasey
- Gilbert Vassall (1902–1905): GC Vassall
- Archie Vaughan (2024–2026): AM Vaughan
- Tony Vickery (1947–1948): A Vickery
- Murali Vijay (2019): M Vijay
- Amar Virdi (2022): GS Virdi
- Roy Virgin (1957–1972): RT Virgin

== W ==
- Neil Wagner (2023): N Wagner
- Frederic Waldock (1920–1924): FA Waldock
- Micky Walford (1946–1953): MM Walford
- Malcolm Walker (1952–1958): M Walker
- Max Waller (2009–2022): MTC Waller
- Launcelot Ward (1913–1920): LES Ward
- John Watson (1933–1936): JR Watson
- Hugh Watts (1939–1952): HE Watts
- Steve Waugh (1987–1988): SR Waugh
- Sam Weaver (1932): S Weaver
- Tom Webley (2003): T Webley
- Arthur Wellard (1927–1950): AW Wellard
- Tristram Welman (1882–1901): FT Welman
- Albert Westcott (1894–1902): AH Westcott
- Edward Western (1882–1884): E Western
- Louis Wharton (1921–1922): LE Wharton
- Ellis Whately (1904): EG Whately
- Heneage Wheeler (1904): HG Wheeler
- Cameron White (2006–2007): CL White
- Giles White (1991–1993): GW White
- Jack White (1909–1937): JC White
- Alan Whitehead (1957–1961): AGT Whitehead
- Walter Whiting (1921–1923): WS Whiting
- Albert Whittle (1907–1911): AEM Whittle
- Archie Wickham (1891–1907): AP Wickham
- Peter Wight (1953–1965): PB Wight
- Walter Wilde (1929): WS Wilde
- Donald Wilkins (1927): DA Wilkins
- Steve Wilkinson (1971–1974): SG Wilkinson
- Terry Willetts (1964–1967): FT Willetts
- Lloyd Williams (1955): GL Williams
- Charl Willoughby (2006–2011): CM Willoughby
- Hugh Wilson (1983–1984): PHL Wilson
- Raymond Windsor (1969): RTA Windsor
- Charles Winter (1882–1895): CE Winter
- Charles Winter (1921–1925): CA Winter
- Harry Winter (1884): HE Winter
- John Winter (1884): JA Winter
- George Wood (1893–1894): GR Wood
- Henry Wood (1904): H Wood
- Matthew Wood (2001–2007): MJ Wood
- Thomas Wood (1894): T Wood
- George Woodcock (1921): G Woodcock
- George Woodhouse (1946–1953): GES Woodhouse
- Robert Woodman (2005): RJ Woodman
- Sammy Woods (1891–1910): SMJ Woods
- Bob Woolston (1987): RG Woolston
- Damien Wright (2010): DG Wright
- Oswald Wright (1902): OW Wright
- Julian Wyatt (1983–1989): JG Wyatt

== Y ==
- Yasir Arafat (2013–2016): Yasir Arafat
- Yawar Saeed (1953–1955): Yawar Saeed
- Sam Young (2021): SJ Young
- Tom Young (1911–1933): A Young
- Wilfrid Young (1891–1893): WAR Young

== See also ==
- List of Somerset cricket captains

== Bibliography ==
- ACS (1981). A Guide to Important Cricket Matches Played in the British Isles 1709 – 1863. Nottingham: ACS.
- ACS (1982). A Guide to First-Class Cricket Matches Played in the British Isles. Nottingham: ACS.
- Johns, Nigel (1996), Somerset County Cricket Club First-Class Records 1882–1995 (County Record Books), Limlow Books Ltd, ISBN 1874524181
