= Montague (given name) =

Montague (/ˈmɒntəɡjuː/ MON-tə-ghew) is a male given name. Notable people with the name include:

- Montague Ainslie (1792–1884) English forester and businessman
- Montague Aldous (1850–1946) British Dominion topographical surveyor
- Monty Banks (1897–1950) Italian comedian and director
- Sir Montague Barlow
- Montague Bertie, 11th Earl of Lindsey
- Montague Bertie, 12th Earl of Lindsey
- Montague Birch
- Montague Browning (1863–1947) Royal Navy officer
- Montague Burton
- Montague Castle (1867-1939) Canadian-born American stained glass artist, businessperson, and painter
- Montague Chambers (1799–1885) British politician
- Montague Chamberlain
- Sir Montague Cholmeley, 1st Baronet of the Cholmeley baronets
- Sir Montague Cholmeley, 2nd Baronet of the Cholmeley baronets
- M. Graham Clark
- Montague John Druitt
- Montague James Furlong, boxer commonly known as Jim Hall
- Montague Harry Holcroft
- Montague James Mathew
- Sir Montagu Aubrey Rowley Cholmeley, 4th Baronet of the Cholmeley baronets
- Sir Montague John Cholmeley, 6th Baronet of the Cholmeley baronets
- Montague Dawson
- Monty Don
- Montague Eliot, 8th Earl of St Germans (1870–1960) British peer and courtier
- Montague Fordham
- Montague Glover
- Montague Gore
- Montague Guest
- Montague Hambling
- M. R. James (1862–1936) British author and scholar
- Montague Jayawickrama (1911–2001), Sri Lankan Sinhala politician
- Montague Lessler
- Montagu Love (1877–1943) English actor
- Montague Miller
- Montague Modlyn (1921–1994) British journalist and radio host
- Montague Muir-Mackenzie
- Montague Napier
- Montague Noble
- Montague Ongley
- Monte Pfeffer (1891–1941) American baseball player
- Monty Porter
- Montague Scott
- Montague Shearman (1857–1930) English judge
- Montague Edward Smith (1806–1891) British politician and judge
- Montague Sturt
- Montague Summers (1880–1948) English writer
- Montague Tyrwhitt-Drake
- Montague Ullman (1916–2008) American psychiatrist
- Montague Waldegrave, 5th Baron Radstock
- Monty Wedd
- Monty Westmore
- Montague White
- Montague Williamson
- Montague Wilmot
- Montague Woodhouse, 5th Baron Terrington
- Montague Younger

== See also ==
- Montagu (disambiguation)
- Montague Burton Professor of International Relations named chair at the University of Oxford and the London School of Economics
