= Box Case =

English cricketer (1895–1969)

Personal information
- Full name: Cecil Charles Coles Case
- Born: 7 September 1895; Frome, Somerset, England
- Died: 11 November 1969 (aged 74); Frome, Somerset, England
- Batting: Right-handed
- Role: Batsman

Domestic team information
- Years: Team
- 1925–1935: Somerset
- FC debut: 16 May 1925 Somerset v Warwickshire
- Last FC: 2 July 1935 Somerset v Gloucestershire

Career statistics
Competition	First-class
Matches	257
Runs scored	8,574
Batting average	22.09
100s/50s	9/39
Top score	155
Balls bowled	95
Wickets	0
Bowling average	–
5 wickets in innings	–
10 wickets in match	–
Best bowling	–
Catches/stumpings	47/–
- Source: CricketArchive, 15 December 2009

Cecil Charles Cole Case, known as Box Case, (7 September 1895 – 11 November 1969) played first-class cricket for Somerset as an amateur batsman between 1925 and 1935. He was born at Frome, Somerset and died at Keyford, which is part of Frome.

Case was a right-handed middle-order batsman whose batting technique, in one account, was "limited and effective". He also kept wicket very occasionally in the period at the end of the 1920s and into the 1930s when regular Somerset wicket-keeper Wally Luckes was ill. Although the Somerset side in Case's time often contained amateur players who appeared in relatively few matches, Case was virtually a regular, appearing in 255 matches for the county in 11 seasons, plus two for the Gentlemen in Gentlemen v Players games in 1931 and 1934.

== Before cricket ==
Case was educated at King's School, Bruton. He was commissioned as a second lieutenant in the Third Battalion of the Dorsetshire Regiment and served with the regiment throughout the First World War. In October 1918, the London Gazette reported he had been promoted to captain the previous December, but this notice was rescinded five days later. By 1919, he was on the reserve officer list. He left the army on 1 April 1920.

== Early cricket career ==
Case played one Minor Counties cricket match for Dorset in 1923. In 1925, he began playing fairly regularly for Somerset, batting mostly in the middle order but sometimes opening the innings. It was as an opener that he made his first first-class 50, an innings of 59 in a first-wicket partnership of 117 with his captain John Daniell in the match against Essex at Taunton. In the season as a whole, in 15 first-class matches he scored 349 runs at an average of 13.96. There was a small improvement on these figures in 1926, when Case played in 20 matches and scored 471 runs at an average of 15.70, although he did not reach 50 in any innings.

Case's big advance as a cricketer came in 1927. Wisden noted that he "made great strides as a batsman, almost doubling his runs and increasing his average by nearly ten". His final figures for the season were 920 runs at 23.58. These included his first two centuries. The higher of these was 122 in the match against Gloucestershire at Taunton, when he put on 235 for the fifth wicket with Jack White, who also made a debut century. The stand was a record for the fifth wicket for Somerset and remained so for 78 years until beaten by the 320 that John Francis and Ian Blackwell put on against a Durham university side in 2005. Later in the season, Case made an unbeaten 107 in the match against Sussex at Taunton; he made 44 not out in the first innings batting at No 8, and was promoted to No 4 for the second innings when he again carried his bat.

Wisden's Somerset notes for the 1927 season give a view of Case's batting style. "Cramped in style, and with scarcely any free use of wrists or shoulders, Case yet batted far better than could be seen from the ring," it said. "His defence was very difficult to get through and, with little uplift of his bat, he put unexpected power into his drives and pulls." A more recent account is more forthright: "The kindest adjective to evoke his style was probably ugly," wrote David Foot in a 1986 history of Somerset cricket. "He didn't go in for back lifts and expansive sweeps of the blade; he didn't really go in for attacking shots at all. There was no athleticism in his movement." Foot recounts a story from a match against Nottinghamshire in which Bill Voce was experimenting with leg theory bowling: "(Case) missed the ball, fell in a ludicrous heap and then picked up a stump instead of the bat."

Case's 1927 record set the pattern for the next seven seasons. He missed a few matches in 1928, and his aggregate of runs fell to 685, but the average improved to 24.46; in 1929, he made 1000 runs in a season for the first time with 1035 runs, though the average fell back slightly to 21.56 and the highest score was only 77. There was a third century in 1930 – 108 against Middlesex at Taunton – and he missed the 1000 runs in the season by only 15. In 1931, there were 1034 runs, and in the first three matches of the season, Case increased his highest first-class score twice. First, in the match against Hampshire at Taunton, he hit 131 with 12 fours. Then, against Surrey at The Oval, he came in at No 6 after four Somerset wickets had fallen for 35 runs, all of them to Edward Sheffield, and made 155 in 210 minutes.

== Later career ==
Case's form dipped in 1932 and he managed only 539 runs in the season with an average of 19.96. His one century in the season came in a match against Northamptonshire on his home ground at Frome, when his 112 enabled Somerset to recover from 46 for five to reach 295 in the second innings, though the match was still lost. But he more than doubled his aggregate in the following season, 1933, reaching 1146 runs at an average of 26.65, and this was his best total of runs for a single season. Case's methods did not meet with Wisden's approval in one of his two centuries in the 1933 season: his innings of 132 against Hampshire at Bath took 260 minutes and Case was accused of "displaying exaggerated care" in a match where the first day (of three) had been lost to rain and which ended without even two innings being completed. His second century of the summer was an innings of 111 in the match against Middlesex at Weston-super-Mare, when he shared a second-wicket partnership of 184 with Bunty Longrigg, who made a rather faster 101.

The 1934 season was Case's last complete season in first-class cricket and in terms of batting average his most successful: he made 1049 runs at an average of 28.35 despite missing several matches through injury. "Case could generally be relied upon for runs," wrote Wisden, a useful attribute in a poor batting side. His single century, the ninth and last of his career, was an unbeaten 106 in what Wisden called "a remarkable match" against Gloucestershire at Bristol. Somerset trailed Gloucestershire by 50 runs after the first innings: "Then, on a crumbling pitch, Parker and Goddard gained such a mastery that Somerset lost seven batsmen for 37, but Case and Bennett pulled the game round in an eighth(-wicket) stand of 125. Case scored readily off good-length bowling, at times hitting very hard." Somerset totalled 192 and won the match by 39 runs.

Case was injured halfway through the 1935 season, and played in only 13 matches, scoring just 361 runs. His last first-class match was another derby match against Gloucestershire, this time at Bath, and again his intervention was decisive: set 101 to win, Somerset had slumped to 85 for 9 when the injured Case came in at No 11 to join Horace Hazell, the left-arm spinner who was Somerset's normal No 11 for more than 20 years. Together, they hit off the runs to win the match by one wicket. Case was unable to take part in any further matches and he retired from first-class cricket at the end of the season. Wisden, which had not always been complimentary, wrote that he was missed in the second half of the 1935 season: "If never a stylist, Case could often be relied upon to stay a collapse, and for practically half the season his stubborn tactics were much missed," it wrote.
