= Charles Bowring =

Charles Bowring may refer to:

- Charles R. Bowring (1840–1890), Canadian merchant and politician
- Charles J. Bowring (1887–1959), English cricketer
- Charles Calvert Bowring (1872–1945), British colonial administrator

== See also ==
- John Charles Bowring (1821–1893), Hong Kong businessman
