= Trevor Jones (cricketer) =

English cricketer (1920–2005)

Personal information
- Full name: Archibald Trevor Maxwell Jones
- Born: 9 April 1920; Wells, Somerset, England
- Died: 17 June 2005 (aged 85); Padstow, Cornwall, England
- Batting: Right-handed
- Bowling: Right-arm leg spin
- Role: Batsman

Domestic team information
- Years: Team
- 1938–1948: Somerset
- First-class debut: 11 June 1938 Somerset v Nottinghamshire
- Last First-class: 9 July 1948 Somerset v Lancashire

Career statistics
Competition	First-class
Matches	21
Runs scored	399
Batting average	11.40
100s/50s	1/1
Top score	106
Balls bowled	153
Wickets	3
Bowling average	44.00
5 wickets in innings	–
10 wickets in match	–
Best bowling	1/3
Catches/stumpings	16/–
- Source: CricketArchive, 4 July 2010

Archibald Trevor Maxwell Jones (9 April 1920 – 17 June 2005) played first-class cricket for Somerset from 1938 to 1948. He was born at Wells, Somerset and died at Padstow, Cornwall.

Jones was a lower-order right-handed batsman and an occasional leg-spin bowler whose cricket fame rests almost entirely on a single innings played for Somerset when he was just 18 years old.

== Cricket career ==
Jones made his first-class debut in the match against Nottinghamshire at Taunton in June 1938 while still at school and in his first innings, batting at No 8, he made 40 and put on 60 with John Barnwell, the highest stand of the innings. Wisden reported that he "made some nice strokes". He retained his place in the Somerset side over the next month, but did not make many runs.

In the match against Leicestershire at Leicester, Jones batted at No 9 as Somerset made 190 in the first innings, to which Leicestershire replied with 358 to lead by 168 on first innings. When Jones went in, again at No 9, in Somerset's second innings, the score was 123 for seven wickets, still 45 behind. A further wicket fell early on the last morning of the match with the score at 140, still needing 28 to make Leicestershire bat again. But Jones and the wicketkeeper Wally Luckes then put on a partnership of 146 for the ninth wicket, and when Jones was out for 106, Luckes then went on to add a further 70 runs for the last wicket with Horace Hazell, enabling Somerset to save the game. The ninth wicket partnership of 146 was a record for Somerset in first-class cricket at the time, though it has been overtaken since. At 18 years and 104 days, Jones was the youngest century-maker in Somerset's history, and though there were few other runs for Jones in the 1938 season, Wisden noted in its 1939 edition that "if able to spare the time he should, with greater experience, develop into a first-class batsman".

That development, however, never materialised. In 1939, Jones played in only one first-class match, scoring 52 in a high-scoring drawn game with Glamorgan at Newport. And when cricket resumed after the Second World War, Jones failed to recapture any kind of form, scoring just 66 runs in 12 innings spread between the 1946 and 1948 seasons, with a highest of only 13.

== After first-class cricket ==
Jones played in club cricket in Bristol after the Second World War. He was also a successful bridge player. At his death in hospital in Padstow in 2005, he had been living in St Merryn, Cornwall, and he was survived by his wife and a daughter, two sons and two grandsons, one of whom (A G M Hodges) achieved minor success as an amateur golfer.
