= Walter Wilde =

English cricketer

Personal information
- Full name: Walter Stanley Wilde
- Born: 27 February 1908; Long Ashton, Somerset, England
- Died: 21 August 1968 (aged 60); Clevedon, Somerset, England
- Role: Wicketkeeper

Domestic team information
- Years: Team
- 1929: Somerset
- First-class debut: 11 May 1929 Somerset v Worcestershire
- Last First-class: 27 June 1929 Somerset v Kent

Career statistics
Competition	First-class
Matches	7
Runs scored	45
Batting average	5.62
100s/50s	–/–
Top score	21
Balls bowled	–
Wickets	–
Bowling average	–
5 wickets in innings	–
10 wickets in match	–
Best bowling	–
Catches/stumpings	9/1
- Source: CricketArchive, 6 June 2010

Walter Stanley Wilde (27 February 1908 – 21 August 1968) played first-class cricket for Somerset in seven County Championship matches in the 1929 season. He was born in Long Ashton, Somerset and died at Clevedon, Somerset.

Wilde was a tail-end batsman and a wicketkeeper who was drafted into the Somerset side for early matches in May and June 1929 because of the illness of the regular wicketkeeper Wally Luckes. Wisden Cricketers' Almanack noted that Somerset used seven different wicketkeepers during the 1929 season, including Wilde and Luckes.

Wilde's only batting success and the only time he reached double figures in first-class cricket came in the match against Derbyshire at Burton-on-Trent when he made 21 of a last-wicket partnership of 47 with Michael Bennett which still did not manage to prevent Somerset from being forced to follow on. In this game he took three catches off the bowling of Arthur Wellard in Derbyshire's only innings, the best return of his short career. When the amateur Michael Spurway became available to keep wicket in mid-season, Wilde, as a professional, was dropped and did not play first-class cricket again.
