= Robert Draper (disambiguation) =

Robert Draper is a writer.

Robert Draper may also refer to:

- Robert Draper (bishop), Anglican bishop in Ireland
- Robert Draper (cricketer) (1903–1987), cricketer for Somerset
- Robert Draper (MP) (died 1395/6), MP for Bath, England
- Robert Draper (painter), Navajo painter of landscapes
- Robert Draper, character in Pacific Blackout
- Robert Draper, singer with The Accents
