= Richard Payne =

Richard Payne may refer to:

== Sportsmen ==
- Richard Payne (cricketer, born 1827) (1827–1906), English cricketer
- Richard Selwyn Payne (1885–1949), English cricketer

== Others ==
- Richard Payne (priest) (died 1507), Canon of Windsor
- Rick Payne, fictional character in Ghost Whisperer
- Ricky Payne, musician in The Flying Pickets
- Richard Payne, keyboardist in the Bluetones

== See also ==
- Richard Payn, member of parliament for Shaftesbury
