= James Priddy =

English cricketer

James Priddy (3 December 1909 – 12 July 1994) played first-class cricket for Somerset between 1933 and 1939. He was born at Chard, Somerset and died at Weston-super-Mare, also in Somerset.

Priddy was a lower-order batsman and a bowler, though neither his batting style nor his bowling style are known. He made his debut in the 1933 match against the West Indians and recorded his best bowling figures, two for 114, in the tourists' single innings, in which they scored 482 for six wickets before declaring. He also made an unbeaten 20 out of a last wicket stand of 69 with Wally Luckes to save the match, the ninth wicket having fallen when Somerset were just 44 runs ahead.

Priddy played in one other first-class match in 1933 without success, and then disappeared from first-class cricket for five seasons. He reappeared in five matches in the 1939 season, but took only one wicket in them. He did, however, improve his highest score: in the match against Essex, batting at No 4, he made 27 in the first innings.

In a notice following his death in 1994 in The London Gazette, he was described as a retired company director, living at 11A Cecil Road, Weston-super-Mare.
