= Arthur Ricketts =

English cricketer

Arthur James Ricketts (27 August 1913 – April 2000) played first-class cricket for Somerset in one match in 1936. He was born at Farmborough, Somerset and died in Somerset too, though the exact date and place of his death is not known.

Ricketts had one of the briefest of all first-class cricket careers. He was picked, alongside Jack White and Horace Hazell, as a third slow left-arm orthodox spin bowler for Somerset's match against Surrey at Taunton; in a rain-ruined game, he did not bowl in Surrey's innings, and when rain finished the match at close of play on the second day with Somerset at 38 for eight, he had not batted. He was never given a second chance.
