= William Burgess (cricketer) =

English cricketer

Personal information
- Full name: William Arthur Burgess
- Born: 31 January 1888; Williton, Somerset, England
- Died: 20 June 1970 (aged 82); Minehead, Somerset, England
- Batting: Right-handed
- Bowling: Left-arm (unknown style)

Domestic team information
- Years: Team
- 1921–1922: Somerset

Career statistics
Competition	FC
Matches	7
Runs scored	211
Batting average	17.58
100s/50s	0/1
Top score	79
Balls bowled	534
Wickets	6
Bowling average	41.00
5 wickets in innings	0
10 wickets in match	0
Best bowling	2/39
Catches/stumpings	7/–
- Source: CricketArchive, 22 December 2015

William Arthur Burgess (31 January 1888 at Williton, Somerset – 20 June 1970 at Minehead, Somerset), played seven first-class cricket matches for Somerset in 1921 and 1922.

== Biography ==
Burgess was a right-handed middle order batsman and a left-arm bowler. He passed 50 in an innings only once, making 79 and sharing in a fourth wicket partnership of 128 with Ulick Considine in the match against Worcestershire at Taunton in July 1921.

== See also ==
- William Burgess at www.cricketarchive.com
