= Fred Coyle =

English cricketer

Personal information
- Full name: Frederick Thomas Coyle
- Born: 25 July 1869; Taunton, Somerset
- Died: 12 September 1925 (aged 56); Halifax, Yorkshire
- Batting: Right-handed
- Bowling: Right-arm fast-medium

Domestic team information
- Years: Team
- 1903–1905: Somerset

Career statistics
Competition	First-class
Matches	2
Runs scored	14
Batting average	14.00
100s/50s	0/0
Top score	10
Balls bowled	132
Wickets	0
Bowling average	–
5 wickets in innings	0
10 wickets in match	0
Best bowling	0/2
Catches/stumpings	4/–
- Source: CricketArchive, 10 January 2017

Frederick Thomas Coyle (25 July 1869 – 12 September 1925) was a professional cricketer, who primarily played club cricket, but also made two appearances in first-class cricket for Somerset County Cricket Club in the early twentieth century. He was a right-arm fast bowler, and continued to play professional cricket well into his forties, while also working as a sports-outfitter.

== Life and career ==
Frederick Thomas Coyle was born on 25 July 1869 in Taunton, to Thomas and Ann Coyle. He was one of seven children in a Roman Catholic family, and his first job was working for the family business, making a coarse horsehair fabric. He married Mary Philomena Colvin in 1891 in Taunton, before the pair moved Northumberland in 1896, where Coyle could play professional cricket. He appeared for Chester-le-Street from 1897 to 1900, also playing for Northumberland County Cricket Club during his time there. He moved to Halifax, West Yorkshire to set up a sports outfitters, while continuing his cricket career.

He played his first match for Somerset in August 1903, when he, Sammy Woods and Frank Phillips came into the team replacing John Daniell, Oswald Samson and Gilbert Vassall. Facing Kent in Taunton, Coyle was not brought on to bowl until the visitors had already accrued 157 runs, and only bowled three overs in the innings. He opened the bowling in the second innings, but only bowled four overs before the game finished as a draw. He did not take a wicket in either innings, and did not appear for Somerset again that season.

In 1904, he was employed by Oldham Cricket Club as their professional, with the Nottingham Evening Post noting that he was "an exceptionally good player all round". He played again for Somerset in 1905, facing Hampshire in Southampton. Once again, he failed to take a wicket, but did claim three catches in the slips. So ended his first-class cricket career: in all he bowled 22 overs without taking a wicket, conceding 54 runs. He scored 14 runs across three batting innings, and was only dismissed once.

He continued to play club cricket in Halifax until well into his forties. In 1922, he underwent surgery to remove a cancerous growth, but the operation only prolonged his life. He died on 12 September 1925 in Halifax.
