= John Watson (Somerset cricketer) =

English cricketer

Personal information
- Full name: John Russell Watson
- Born: 22 August 1910; Caundle Purse, Dorset, England
- Died: 7 March 1980 (aged 69); Yeovil, Somerset, England
- Batting: Right-handed
- Role: Batsman

Domestic team information
- Years: Team
- 1933–36: Somerset
- First-class debut: 17 May 1933 Somerset v Derbyshire
- Last First-class: 20 July 1936 Somerset v Hampshire

Career statistics
Competition	First-class
Matches	19
Runs scored	375
Batting average	12.09
100s/50s	–/1
Top score	56
Balls bowled	–
Wickets	–
Bowling average	–
5 wickets in innings	–
10 wickets in match	–
Best bowling	–
Catches/stumpings	4/–
- Source: CricketArchive, 24 September 2010

John Russell Watson (22 August 1910 – 7 March 1980) played first-class cricket for Somerset between 1933 and 1936. He was born at Caundle Purse, Sherborne, Dorset and died at Yeovil, Somerset.

Watson was a right-handed batsman used mainly by Somerset in the lower order. In his first match, against Derbyshire at Ilkeston in May 1933, he came in for his second innings with the Somerset score on 63 for six wickets, Somerset and Derbyshire having been dismissed for 87 and 81 all out respectively in their first innings. Watson hit 56 and shared an eighth wicket partnership of 92 with Michael Bennett, though Derbyshire then won the match easily.

Watson played seven further games for Somerset that season, but his highest score in these matches was only 33, and a few matches in each of the 1934, 1935 and 1936 seasons were no more successful.

After the Second World War, he played in a few Minor Counties matches for Dorset.
