= William Bunce (cricketer) =

English cricketer

Personal information
- Full name: William Newman Bunce
- Born: 17 April 1911; Pill, Somerset, England
- Died: 29 May 1981 (aged 70); Pill, Somerset, England
- Batting: Left-handed
- Bowling: Right-arm fast-medium
- Role: Batsman

Domestic team information
- Years: Team
- 1936–1937: Somerset
- First-class debut: 16 May 1936 Somerset v Lancashire
- Last First-class: 2 July 1937 Somerset v New Zealanders

Career statistics
| Competition | First-class |
|---|---|
| Matches | 14 |
| Runs scored | 227 |
| Batting average | 12.61 |
| 100s/50s | –/– |
| Top score | 46 |
| Balls bowled | 258 |
| Wickets | 4 |
| Bowling average | 46.50 |
| 5 wickets in innings | – |
| 10 wickets in match | – |
| Best bowling | 3/81 |
| Catches/stumpings | 4/– |
- Source: CricketArchive, 13 January 2011

William Newman Bunce (17 April 1911 – 29 May 1981) played first-class cricket for Somerset in 14 matches in the 1936 and 1937 seasons. He was born and died at Pill, Somerset.

Bunce was a left-handed middle- or lower-order batsman and an occasional right-arm medium-fast bowler. He played in five matches in the 1936 season, all of them away from Somerset, without much success, but did better in his nine games in 1937, scoring 185 runs at an average of 18.50 runs per innings. His highest score came in one of only three home games he played in his Somerset career: against Kent at Bath he batted at No 10 and made 46, putting on 93 with Wally Luckes, who made his maiden century, 121 not out. His only bowling "success" came in his second match in 1936, when he took three wickets for 81 runs in the match against Surrey at The Oval; the success was relative, however, as Surrey amassed a total of 512 in a day and won the match by an innings.
