= Alec Cunningham =

English cricketer

Personal information
- Full name: Alec George Gordon Cunningham
- Born: 15 July 1905; Knowle, Somerset, England
- Died: 21 July 1981 (aged 76); Keynsham, Somerset, England
- Batting: Right-handed

Domestic team information
- Years: Team
- 1930: Somerset

Career statistics
Competition	FC
Matches	2
Runs scored	10
Batting average	10.00
100s/50s	0/0
Top score	6*
Catches/stumpings	3/1
- Source: CricketArchive, 22 December 2015

Alec George Gordon Cunningham (15 July 1905 at Knowle, Somerset – 21 July 1981 at Keynsham, Somerset), was a cricketer who played two first-class matches for Somerset in the 1930 cricket season.

A lower-order batsman and wicketkeeper, Cunningham was picked as one of a series of temporary replacements for the regular Somerset wicketkeeper, Wally Luckes, who suffered ill-health over several seasons around 1930.

Cunningham appeared first in the university match against Cambridge University at Fenner's early in June, made 6 not out, his highest score, and took two catches and a stumping. Two weeks later, his second and final game was the home match at Taunton against Nottinghamshire. He made 2 not out batting at No 11 in the first innings and took one catch, but was then tried as a makeshift opener in the second Somerset innings, when the county batted again with very little time left on the second day. The move was not a success: Cunningham was out for 2 before the close of play, the only time in his first-class career when he was dismissed.

He did not play first-class cricket again.
