= Peter Graham (cricketer, born 1920) =

Personal information
- Full name: Peter Arthur Onslow Graham
- Born: 27 December 1920; Kurseong, Darjeeling, India
- Died: 2 March 2000 (aged 79); Jersey
- Batting: Right-handed
- Bowling: Right-arm fast

Domestic team information
- Years: Team
- 1948: Somerset

Career statistics
Competition	First-class
Matches	6
Runs scored	82
Batting average	9.11
100s/50s	0/0
Top score	33
Balls bowled	548
Wickets	7
Bowling average	45.14
5 wickets in innings	0
10 wickets in match	0
Best bowling	3/47
Catches/stumpings	3/–
- Source: CricketArchive, 10 January 2017

Peter Arthur Onslow Graham (27 December 1920 – 2 March 2000) played first-class cricket for Somerset in six matches in 1948. He was born at Kurseong, Darjeeling, India and died on the island of Jersey.

The son of a Darjeeling tea-planter and educated at Tonbridge School, Graham was a lower-order right-handed batsman and a right-arm bowler: his CricketArchive profile rates him as "fast", but the report in Wisden Cricketers' Almanack of his first first-class match in 1948 reads: "Graham, from Burnham-on-Sea, bowled well at medium-pace". In fact, that first game, a first-class friendly match between Glamorgan and Somerset at Rodney Parade, Newport, was Graham's most successful: he took four wickets in the match, including three for 47 in the Glamorgan first innings, and scored 33 at the end of Somerset's second innings. In five County Championship matches in the early part of the season, Graham never managed to surpass either the bowling figures or the highest score, and he took only three wickets in these games, all of them in the match against Gloucestershire, in which Gloucestershire made a total of 522 to win by an innings. He did not appear for Somerset in first-class matches after June 1948, though as late as 1953 he played a non-first-class game for the side against a Royal Air Force side that included Fred Trueman.

His obituary in Wisden in 2001 states that he later became a tobacco farmer in Southern Rhodesia.

Peter's older brother; Captain John Onslow Graham (8th Punjab Regiment), was killed leading a heroic charge during the Battle of Kampar during the Malaya Campaign in 1942.
