= Tony Vickery =

English cricketer

Anthony Vickery (26 August 1925 – 27 May 2013) played first-class cricket for Somerset in 1947 and 1948. He also played Minor Counties cricket for 10 years from 1949 for Cheshire. He was born at Taunton, Somerset.

Vickery played half a dozen matches as a right-handed batsman for Somerset, without much success. His best innings was only 21 and was made batting at No 9 in the second innings of the match against Worcestershire at Worcester in 1947; he had batted at No 3 in the first innings and a week earlier in the home match against the same opponents he had opened in one innings. After graduating from Bristol University, Vickery moved to the north of England, where he played as a heavy-scoring middle-order batsman and a regular bowler for Cheshire until 1959.
