= Robert Porch =

English cricketer

Personal information
- Full name: Robert Bagehot Porch
- Born: 3 April 1875; Weston-super-Mare, Somerset, England
- Died: 29 October 1962 (aged 87); Great Malvern, Worcestershire, England
- Batting: Right-handed
- Bowling: Right-arm leg-break
- Role: Batsman

Domestic team information
- Years: Team
- 1895–1910: Somerset
- First-class debut: 20 May 1895 Somerset v Oxford University
- Last First-class: 31 August 1910 Somerset v Yorkshire

Career statistics
Competition	First-class
Matches	27
Runs scored	665
Batting average	15.46
100s/50s	–/1
Top score	85*
Balls bowled	85
Wickets	–
Bowling average	–
5 wickets in innings	–
10 wickets in match	–
Best bowling	–
Catches/stumpings	10/–
- Source: CricketArchive, 15 September 2010

Robert Bagehot Porch (3 April 1875 – 29 October 1962) played first-class cricket for Somerset from 1895 to 1910. He was born at Weston-super-Mare, Somerset and died at Great Malvern, Worcestershire.

== Family and background ==
Porch's family were prominent bankers in the company of Reeves and Porch in the Somerset town of Glastonbury and both his grandfather, Thomas Porch Porch (originally named Thomas Porch Reeves), and his father, John Albert Porch, were long-serving members of the town council and mayor of Glastonbury three times each. Porch's mother was Margaret Bagehot from Langport, a cousin of the economist and political writer Walter Bagehot; the Bagehots were also prominent Somerset bankers and the family firm was Stuckey's of Langport, which had taken over Reeves and Porch and which was in Victorian times the second largest producer of banknotes in England after the Bank of England. The colonial administrator Montague Phippen Porch (1877–1964), who became the third husband of Jennie Jerome and therefore the stepfather of Winston Churchill in 1918 (though three years younger than Churchill), was Robert Porch's first cousin. The Porch family's wealth was based on the bank, but a run on the bank in the early 20th century meant that the estate at Edgarley in Glastonbury was broken up on Robert Porch's father's death in 1914.

Robert Porch was educated at Malvern College where he was a member of the first eleven at cricket and second eleven at football, and a school prefect. He then studied at Trinity College, Oxford, graduating in 1898.

== Cricket career ==
Porch was a right-handed middle-order batsman. He did not appear in first-class cricket for Oxford University, but when Somerset played the university side in 1895, he played for the county team, scoring 11 and 42. At the end of the university term, he became a fairly regular player for Somerset in the second half of the 1895 season. In his third first-class match, against Essex at Taunton, he scored an unbeaten 85, and this was to be the highest score of his cricket career; he was upstaged in the match, however, by the Essex total of 692, which was the highest total for the county for 95 years until beaten in 1990. Even that Essex record was upstaged in Porch's next match for Somerset at Taunton, though, when Lancashire made 801, with Archie MacLaren setting a world record for the highest first-class score by making 424. In his obituary published in Wisden Cricketers' Almanack in 1964, Porch was quoted, apparently without irony, as "a great believer in the importance of fielding". The obituary says that his maxim was: "Save six fours when the other side is batting, and you have 24 to your name before you get off the mark, though it's not in the score-book."

Porch appeared again for Somerset in the matches at Oxford in 1896 and 1897, and played other matches for the county after the Oxford term was over in both seasons, though with little success. He then played twice in 1901, and once each in 1902 and 1903, and a final single match in 1910. In 1904 he became a master at his old school, Malvern College. He was also president of the old Malvernians' club, the Malvernian Society.
