= Arthur Pape =

English cricketer

Personal information
- Full name: Arthur Albert Brinkley Pape
- Born: 30 July 1890; Fairford, Cirencester, Gloucestershire, England
- Died: 11 August 1945 (aged 55); Hartlepool, County Durham, England

Domestic team information
- Years: Team
- 1912: Somerset

Career statistics
Competition	FC
Matches	1
Runs scored	0
Batting average	0.00
100s/50s	0/0
Top score	0
Catches/stumpings	0/–
- Source: CricketArchive, 22 December 2015

Arthur Albert Brinkley Pape (30 July 1890 – 11 August 1945) was an English cricketer who played one first-class match for Somerset in 1912.

Pape batted at No 6 in both Somerset innings of the match against Northamptonshire at Bath, and did not score in either innings. Cricket websites do not indicate whether he was left or right-handed, and in his one first-class match, he did not bowl.

In 1921, he played non-first-class cricket for Durham in the Minor Counties, mostly as a middle-order batsman, but occasionally opening the innings. He scored 100 runs in eight innings, two of them not out, including his personal highest of 49 against Yorkshire Second Eleven.
