= Richard Paull =

English cricketer

Richard Kenyon Paull (born 20 March 1944) played first-class cricket for Somerset in six matches in 1963 and 1964 and for Cambridge University in seven games in 1967. He was born at Bridgwater, Somerset.

Educated at Millfield School, Paull was a right-handed batsman and an infrequent leg-break bowler. He made his debut for Somerset in a single match against Cambridge University in 1963, scoring 13, and maintained this as his career average throughout his short career. As a student at Hull University over the next three years, he played only in the second half of each first-class season, and in fact appeared in first-class matches for Somerset only in 1964, when he again averaged exactly 13. His highest first-class score for Somerset was just 21 not out, made in the match against Sussex at Glastonbury in 1964. From 1965 to 1967, he played only for Somerset's second eleven in both the Second Eleven Championship and the Minor Counties Championship.

Having graduated from Hull, though, he reappeared in first-class cricket for Cambridge University, where he was on a one-year postgraduate course, in 1967 and, as with his earlier career with Somerset, he again averaged just 13 with the bat, though he supplemented that with occasional bowling. In the match against Derbyshire at Ilkeston he scored 37, and this was his highest first-class score. Despite the modest record, he was awarded a Blue and in the match against a much stronger Oxford University he scored 0 and 21 as Cambridge managed to achieve a draw after being made to follow on. Though he played for Somerset's second eleven to the end of the 1967 season, he did not return to first-class cricket.
