= Albert Whittle =

English cricketer

Personal information
- Full name: Albert Edward Mark Whittle
- Born: 16 September 1877; Bristol, England
- Died: 18 March 1917 (aged 39); Charminster, Dorset, England
- Batting: Right-handed
- Bowling: Right-arm medium
- Role: Batsman/all-rounder

Domestic team information
- Years: Team
- 1900–1906: Warwickshire
- 1907–1911: Somerset
- First-class debut: 20 August 1900 Warwickshire v London County
- Last First-class: 3 June 1911 Somerset v Lancashire

Career statistics
Competition	First-class
Matches	89
Runs scored	2552
Batting average	22.00
100s/50s	1/15
Top score	104
Balls bowled	4585
Wickets	64
Bowling average	37.82
5 wickets in innings	2
10 wickets in match	–
Best bowling	5/28
Catches/stumpings	38/–
- Source: CricketArchive, 26 June 2010

Albert Edward Mark Whittle (16 September 1877 – 18 March 1917) was a first-class cricketer who played for Warwickshire and Somerset. He was born in Bristol and died at Charminster, Dorset. Whittle was a useful right-handed batsman the bulk of whose cricket career was spent batting low in the order; he was also a right-arm medium-paced bowler.

== Warwickshire cricketer ==
Whittle first played for Warwickshire in 1900 in a single match against London County, and then appeared in half a dozen games in 1901 without making much impact. He was still an irregular player in 1902, but in the match against Leicestershire at Edgbaston, batting at No 9, he made 81 and put on 148 for the eighth wicket with Willie Quaife. In 1903, he played in half of Warwickshire's games but without success.

Then in 1904 he suddenly made a great advance both as a batsman and as a bowler, and played in every match for Warwickshire. In 21 matches for the county, he made 812 runs at an average of 30.07. In the match against Essex at Edgbaston, batting at his customary position of No 9, he made 104, the only century of his career. The 177-run partnership for the eighth wicket he shared with Quaife was a Warwickshire record for that wicket at the time – it was overtaken in 1925 by the partnership of 228 between Alfred Croom and Bob Wyatt that remained Warwickshire's record in 2014. The Whittle-Quaife partnership is still the highest for the eighth wicket for Warwickshire in first-class matches against Essex. In addition to his runs, Whittle also made useful contributions as a bowler in 1904, taking 35 wickets at an average of 28.97, the only season in which he took more than 10 wickets. In the match against Cambridge University, he took five first-innings wickets for 64 runs, following that with three further wickets in the second innings: this was his first five-wicket haul in first-class cricket. Less than a fortnight later, he improved on those figures with his five for 28 causing a Leicestershire collapse that gave Warwickshire victory.

Whittle was not able to sustain this bowling form into 1905. He appeared in only eight games in the season, but managed five scores of 50 or more in them, and his 416 runs were at an average of 41.60, the highest average of his career. But in 1906, his batting fell away badly and he left Warwickshire after this season.

== Somerset cricketer ==
In 1907, Whittle started playing irregularly for Somerset without success in his first year for the club. But the following year, 1908, though his bowling had virtually disappeared, he played regularly as a batsman and amassed his second-best aggregate of runs in a single season, 638 at an average of 20.58. There were no centuries for Somerset: the highest score of his career with the county was 95, made against his former Warwickshire colleagues from the unusual (for him) batting position of No 3. The 1908 season was, however, his only full year for Somerset: he did not play in 1909 or 1910 and a short stint of three matches in 1911 was not a success.
