= George Newport (cricketer) =

Indian-born English cricketer

George Bernard Newport (29 March 1876 – 12 July 1953) played first-class cricket for Somerset in 1902 and 1904. He was born at Muttum, in India and died at Wonford, Exeter, Devon.

Newport was a lower-order right-handed batsman and a wicketkeeper. He played one match in 1902 against Gloucestershire at Bath and scored 11 and 16 in his two innings, as well as taking three catches. His only other appearance was a 12-a-side first-class match against Oxford University in 1904 in which he failed to score in either innings and took just one catch.
