= Harry Pruett =

English cricketer

Harry George Pruett, born in Bristol in 1890 and died at Clifton, Bristol on 22 January 1948, was a cricketer who played two first-class matches for Somerset, one in 1921 and the other in 1926.

Pruett batted at No 11 in both Somerset innings of the match against Derbyshire at Bath, and was out for a duck both times. He did not bowl in this match, which Somerset won. Almost five years later, he had been promoted to No 10 for his second match, against Yorkshire at Huddersfield, and responded with five in the first innings and two in the second as Somerset lost the match heavily. He also bowled nine overs in Yorkshire's only innings, not taking a wicket and conceding 49 runs.

Cricket websites agree that he bowled left-handed, but do not indicate a style: there is no information on whether he batted right or left-handed.
