= Walter Tate =

English cricketer

Walter William Giffard Tate (27 August 1863 – 29 December 1946) was an English cricketer who played first-class cricket for Somerset in 1882. He was born in Axminster, Devon; legal notices in the Sydney Morning Herald of 18 April 1947 indicate a "William Walter Giffard Tate" died at Randwick, Sydney, Australia on 29 December 1946 and the authoritative cricket website CricketArchive has identified this as the same person.

Tate played as a middle-order batsman in a single match for Somerset in the county's first season as a first-class team. He scored 0 in the first innings and 19 in the second of the match against the Marylebone Cricket Club. Tate moved to Australia where he was an executive in a sugar refining group based in Adelaide.
