= Paddy Bucklan =

English cricketer (1916–1989)

Personal information
- Full name: Joseph Edwin Buckland
- Born: 24 September 1916; Lingfield, Surrey, England
- Died: 18 February 1989 (aged 72); Bridgwater, Somerset, England
- Batting: Left-handed
- Bowling: Left-arm fast-medium

Domestic team information
- Years: Team
- 1948: Somerset
- Only FC: 5 May 1948 Somerset v Glamorgan

Career statistics
Competition	First-class
Matches	1
Runs scored	17
Batting average	–
100s/50s	0/0
Top score	17*
Balls bowled	102
Wickets	3
Bowling average	18.33
5 wickets in innings	0
10 wickets in match	0
Best bowling	2/35
Catches/stumpings	2/–
- Source: CricketArchive (subscription required), 29 December 2016

Joseph Edwin Bucklan, known as "Paddy Bucklan", (24 September 1916 – 18 February 1989) was an English cricketer. He was a left-handed batsman and a left-arm medium-fast bowler who played for Somerset. He was born in Lingfield, Surrey. He died at Bridgwater, Somerset in February 1989.

== Name ==
Bucklan was born as "Joseph Edwin Buckland" in 1916, but appears to have shed the final letter of his surname on joining the Merchant Navy in his early 20s; throughout his adult life, he was known as "Paddy", with "Joseph" used only on formal occasions, and his widow and children did not know his original surname until after his death. On cricket scorecards and in press reports of club cricket, he was generally known as "P. Bucklan", although Wisden Cricketers' Almanack's 1949 record of his name in the Somerset scorecard of his only first-class match refers to him as "J. Bucklan". Cricket database CricketArchive calls him "Joe Buckland".

== Cricket career ==
Bucklan was a regular all-round player for Bridgwater Cricket Club having moved to the town for war work after being invalided out of active service. He made one first-class appearance during the 1948 season, playing in an early season friendly match at Rodney Parade, Newport, against Glamorgan in which both teams tried out new players. In his two innings, batting at No 11, he scored 17 runs, finishing not out on both occasions. Bucklan bowled 17 overs in the match, conceded 55 runs and taking three wickets. But he did not win a contract, and made no further first-class appearances, although he later played as an amateur for Somerset's second eleven.
