= Richard Peters (cricketer) =

English cricketer

Richard Charles Peters (12 September 1911 – 26 October 1989) played first-class cricket for Somerset in one match in 1946. He was born at Chew Magna, Somerset and died at Weston-super-Mare, also in Somerset.

Peters was a tail-end right-handed batsman and a right-arm fast bowler. He was in his mid-30s when he played his single first-class match, against Leicestershire at Melton Mowbray, and on a wicket suiting spin bowling rather than pace he bowled only six overs in the match, failing to take a wicket, and not being used at all in the second innings. He was not selected again.
