= William Jewell (cricketer) =

English cricketer

Personal information
- Full name: William John Jewell
- Born: 1 January 1855; Wendron, Helston, Cornwall, England
- Died: 3 March 1927 (aged 72); Taunton, Somerset, England

Domestic team information
- Years: Team
- 1884: Somerset
- Only First-class: 8 May 1884 Somerset v Kent

Career statistics
Competition	First-class
Matches	1
Runs scored	10
Batting average	5.00
100s/50s	0/0
Top score	9
Balls bowled	48
Wickets	0
Bowling average	–
5 wickets in innings	0
10 wickets in match	0
Best bowling	0/14
Catches/stumpings	0/–
- Source: CricketArchive, 9 July 2011

William John Jewell (1 January 1855 – 3 March 1927) was an English first-class cricketer who made one appearance for Somerset County Cricket Club in 1884. He opened the batting for Somerset in both innings of their match against Kent, scoring nine runs in the first innings and one run in the second. He also bowled twelve overs without taking a wicket. Somerset lost the match by an innings and 27 runs. Jewell also played an earlier match for Somerset, in 1880, before they had been granted first-class status. In this match, played against Sussex, Jewell was a tail-end batsman, and claimed four wickets in Sussex's first innings.
