= Edward Collings =

English cricketer

Personal information
- Full name: Edward Peter Collings
- Born: 30 January 1892; Lichfield, Staffordshire, England
- Died: 14 September 1968 (aged 76); Combe Down, Somerset, England
- Batting: Right-handed
- Bowling: Right-arm (unknown style)

Domestic team information
- Years: Team
- 1921–1925: Somerset

Career statistics
Competition	FC
Matches	4
Runs scored	42
Batting average	6.00
100s/50s	0/0
Top score	16
Balls bowled	276
Wickets	2
Bowling average	78.00
5 wickets in innings	0
10 wickets in match	0
Best bowling	2/125
Catches/stumpings	2/–
- Source: CricketArchive, 22 December 2015

Edward Peter Collings (30 January 1892 – 14 September 1968) played first-class cricket for Somerset in two matches in the 1921 season and a further two games in 1925. He was born at Lichfield, Staffordshire and died at Combe Down, Bath, Somerset.

Collings was a lower-order right-handed batsman and a right-arm bowler. It is not known what his bowling style was, but in his two matches in 1925, he opened the bowling for Somerset. His only bowling success came in the match against Essex at Leyton: he took two for 125, his wickets being top-order batsmen Laurie Eastman and John Freeman, but Essex amassed a total of 433 and won by an innings. His batting was negligible, and his highest score was just 16, made in the match against Leicestershire in 1921.
