= Humphrey Burrington =

English cricketer

Personal information
- Full name: Humphrey Sandford Burrington
- Born: 5 April 1882; Bridgwater, Somerset, England
- Died: 15 April 1957 (aged 75); Barnstaple, Devon, England

Domestic team information
- Years: Team
- 1903–1905: Somerset

Career statistics
Competition	FC
Matches	5
Runs scored	65
Batting average	10.83
100s/50s	0/0
Top score	20
Balls bowled	6
Wickets	0
Bowling average	–
5 wickets in innings	–
10 wickets in match	–
Best bowling	0/10
Catches/stumpings	3/–
- Source: CricketArchive, 22 December 2015

Humphrey Sandford Burrington (5 April 1882 – 15 April 1957) played first-class cricket for Somerset from 1903 to 1905. He was born at Bridgwater, Somerset and died at Barnstaple, Devon.

Burrington played in first-class cricket as a lower-order batsman, though it is not known whether he batted right- or left-handed. He played in one game in 1903, two in 1904 and a further two in 1905, but had little success in any of them. His best performances, and the only times he reached double figures as a batsman, came in the game against Kent in 1904 when he made an unbeaten 18 in the first innings and followed that with 20 in the second.

In the First World War, Burrington was commissioned as an officer in the Somerset Light Infantry; in 1916, he was temporarily promoted from second lieutenant to full lieutenant. He was further promoted to acting captain in 1917. He resigned his commission in 1920 and was allowed to keep the rank of captain.

In 1941 he was listed as a solicitor at Bridge Chambers, The Strand, Barnstable Kellys Directory 1941
