= Wyndham Thomas =

English cricketer

Personal information
- Full name: Wyndham Rowland Thomas
- Born: 1 June 1911; Bedford, England
- Died: 29 January 1992 (aged 80); Weston-super-Mare, Somerset, England
- Bowling: Slow left-arm orthodox

Domestic team information
- Years: Team
- 1928: Somerset

Career statistics
Competition	FC
Matches	1
Runs scored	–
Batting average	–
100s/50s	–/–
Top score	–
Catches/stumpings	0/–
- Source: CricketArchive, 22 December 2015

Wyndham Rowland Thomas (1 June 1911 – 29 January 1992) played first-class cricket in one match for Somerset in 1928. He was born in Bedford and died at Weston-super-Mare, Somerset.

Thomas had one of the briefest first-class cricket careers of any player. A slow left-arm orthodox spin bowler, he was picked by Somerset for the match against Derbyshire at Chesterfield in May 1928, two weeks before his 17th birthday. Rain prevented any play on the first two days of a three-day game, and when Derbyshire batted on the third and final day, Thomas was not given a bowl. Somerset's innings had barely started when the game was over, and Thomas did not bat. He did not play first-class cricket again.
