= Arthur Bezer =

English cricketer

Personal information
- Full name: Arthur Herbert Bezer
- Born: 20 October 1875; Bath, Somerset, England
- Died: 11 July 1944 (aged 68); Bath, Somerset, England
- Bowling: Left-arm

Domestic team information
- Years: Team
- 1914: Somerset
- Only FC: 11 June 1914 Somerset v Hampshire

Career statistics
Competition	First-class
Matches	1
Runs scored	1
Batting average	0.50
100s/50s	0/0
Top score	1
Balls bowled	12
Wickets	0
Bowling average	–
5 wickets in innings	–
10 wickets in match	–
Best bowling	–
Catches/stumpings	1/–
- Source: CricketArchive, 20 August 2008

Arthur Bezer (20 October 1875 – 11 July 1944) was an English cricketer. He was a left-arm bowler who played for Somerset. He was born and died in Bath.

Bezer made his only first-class appearance during the 1914 season, playing against Hampshire. He scored a duck in the first innings and just one run in the second innings of a match which Somerset lost by a margin of an innings and 192 runs. Bezer bowled two overs during the match, conceding twelve runs.

He worked as the groundsman at Bath Cricket Club.
