= Fred Herting =

English cricketer

Frederick John Herting (born 25 February 1940) played first-class cricket for Somerset in 1960.

Herting was a lower-order right-handed batsman and a left-arm fast-medium bowler. He played a lot of cricket for Somerset's second eleven in the Minor Counties Championship and the Second Eleven Championship from 1956, but his first-class career was restricted to just five matches in mid-season in 1960. In the first of these, against Gloucestershire at Bath, he took four first-innings wickets for 85 runs.
