= Charles Sweet =

English cricketer

Personal information
- Full name: Charles Francis Long Sweet
- Born: 29 November 1860; Bath, Somerset, England
- Died: 24 January 1932 (aged 71); Teignmouth, Devon, England

Domestic team information
- Years: Team
- 1882–1883: Somerset
- First-class debut: 13 July 1882 Somerset v Gloucestershire
- Last First-class: 23 August 1883 Somerset v Hampshire

Career statistics
Competition	First-class
Matches	5
Runs scored	67
Batting average	16.75
100s/50s	0/0
Top score	19*
Catches/stumpings	3/–
- Source: CricketArchive, 19 May 2011

Charles Francis Long Sweet (29 November 1860 – 24 January 1932) was an English first-class cricketer who played for Somerset County Cricket Club during the 1880s. He made five first-class and seven second-class appearances for the county as a lower-order batsman.

== Life and career ==
Sweet attended Winchester College and played for the school cricket team, appearing against Eton College in 1879. He then entered Keble College, University of Oxford, where he played in the freshmen's trial and the seniors trial in 1880 and 1882 respectively, but did not earn a place on the university team. As a student, he got a fourth-class degree in modern history. He made his county debut for Somerset while the side was still a second-class county, debuting against Leicestershire in 1880. He scored three runs in the first innings, and a further eleven in the second, helping Somerset to an 85-run victory. Sweet scored his highest total for the county, 26 not out while playing against the "Gentlemen of Devon" in 1880, a match in which Somerset reached 357 and achieved an innings victory.

He made his debut first-class appearance during Somerset's maiden year as a first-class county, scoring three runs in the first innings, followed by two in the second against Gloucestershire in 1882. He played three more times that year, during which he reached his highest first-class total, scoring 16 runs against Hampshire, and finishing not out in the innings. He made one further appearance, in 1883, before playing no further notable cricket.

Sweet married Edith Maud Walrond on 6 July 1887, and the pair had three children; George Charles, Dorothy Maud and Leonard Herbert, all of whom adopted the double barrelled surname Walrond Sweet. He was a minister in the Church of England, and acted as rector of Symondsbury, and as curate of St Nicholas Church in Winterborne Kingston. In 1902 he moved from a post as vicar of Milton Lilbourne, Wiltshire, to be vicar at Stourpaine, Dorset.
