= Ray Robinson (sportsman) =

English cricketer and rugby union player

Personal information
- Full name: Raymond Thomas Robinson
- Born: 15 September 1940; Charmouth, Dorset, England
- Died: 13 November 2001 (aged 61); Taunton, Somerset, England
- Batting: Right-handed

Domestic team information
- Years: Team
- 1964: Somerset

Career statistics
| Competition | FC |
|---|---|
| Matches | 1 |
| Runs scored | 0 |
| Batting average | 0.00 |
| 100s/50s | 0/0 |
| Top score | 0 |
| Catches/stumpings | 0/– |
- Source: CricketArchive, 22 December 2015

Raymond Thomas Robinson, born at Charmouth, Dorset on 15 September 1940 and died at Taunton, Somerset on 13 November 2001, was a cricket and rugby union player. He played cricket for Somerset's second team between 1962 and 1971. But he made only one first-class cricket appearance.

A right-handed middle order batsman and a successful bowler in club and second eleven cricket, Robinson's one first-class appearance was in the match against Nottinghamshire at Taunton in June 1964; he batted at No 8 in Somerset's first innings and at No 5 in the second, but failed to score in either innings, and he did not bowl in the match.

Robinson was a successful rugby union player for Taunton, Somerset and the British Police. His son is Andy Robinson, the former Bath, England and British Lions rugby union player and coach to the England and Scotland teams.

Robinson suffered from multiple sclerosis for 26 years up to his death in 2001.
