= Albert Southwood =

English cricketer

Personal information
- Full name: Albert Henry Howard Southwood
- Born: 19 July 1882; Taunton, Somerset, England
- Died: 13 July 1965 (aged 82); Taunton, Somerset, England
- Batting: Right-handed
- Bowling: Right-arm slow
- Role: Batsman

Domestic team information
- Years: Team
- 1911–13: Somerset
- First-class debut: 14 August 1911 Somerset v Kent
- Last First-class: 28 June 1913 Somerset v Worcestershire

Career statistics
| Competition | First-class |
|---|---|
| Matches | 3 |
| Runs scored | 96 |
| Batting average | 16.00 |
| 100s/50s | –/– |
| Top score | 33 |
| Balls bowled | – |
| Wickets | – |
| Bowling average | – |
| 5 wickets in innings | – |
| 10 wickets in match | – |
| Best bowling | – |
| Catches/stumpings | –/– |
- Source: CricketArchive, 12 March 2011

Albert Henry Howard Southwood (19 July 1882 – 13 July 1965) played first-class cricket in three matches for Somerset in the 1911 and 1913 cricket seasons. He was born at Taunton, Somerset and died there too.

Southwood was a right-handed middle or lower order batsman and a right-arm slow bowler, though he did not bowl in his three first-class games. In his debut match against the strong Kent side in 1911 he made 17 and 20 batting at No 8. That was his only match in 1911 but he appeared in two more games in 1913 and in the first of them, against Derbyshire, he batted at No 6 and made 13 and 33, which was the top score of his brief career.
