= Bill Price (cricketer) =

English cricketer

William Leslie Price (19 March 1881 – 6 February 1958) played first-class cricket for Somerset in one match in the 1901 season. He was born at Taunton, Somerset and died there too.

Price played as a lower-order batsman and as wicketkeeper in his single first-class match, scoring 10 in the first innings against Yorkshire at Taunton and failing to score in the second innings.
