= Saqib Mahmood (cricketer, born 1977) =

English cricketer (born 1977)

Personal information
- Full name: Saqib Mahmood
- Born: 24 August 1977 (age 49); Kettering, Northamptonshire, England
- Batting: Right-handed
- Bowling: Right-arm leg break

Domestic team information
- Years: Team
- 1999: Somerset
- Only FC: 25 June 1999 Somerset v New Zealanders

Career statistics
| Competition | First-class |
|---|---|
| Matches | 1 |
| Runs scored | 7 |
| Batting average | 7.00 |
| 100s/50s | 0/0 |
| Top score | 7* |
| Balls bowled | 18 |
| Wickets | 0 |
| Bowling average | – |
| 5 wickets in innings | – |
| 10 wickets in match | – |
| Best bowling | – |
| Catches/stumpings | 1/– |
- Source: CricketArchive, 29 January 2016

Saqib Mahmood (born 24 August 1977) played first-class cricket for Somerset in 1999. He was born at Kettering, Northamptonshire.

Mahmood was a right-handed lower-order batsman and a right-arm leg-break bowler. Having played for Essex's second eleven in 1997 and 1998, he joined Somerset, but appeared in only one first-class match. Against the 1999 New Zealanders he batted at No 11 and scored an unbeaten seven in the first innings and was out without scoring in the second innings; his bowling was unfortunate, and his two overs in the first innings went for 34 runs, including six no-balls, while his single over in the New Zealanders' second innings had nine runs scored from it. He did not play for Somerset again.
