= Michael Bryant (cricketer) =

English cricketer (born 1959)

Personal information
- Full name: Michael Bryant
- Born: 5 April 1959 (age 67); Beacon, Camborne, Cornwall, England
- Batting: Right-handed
- Bowling: Right-arm fast-medium

Domestic team information
- Years: Team
- 1982: Somerset

Career statistics
Competition	FC
Matches	2
Runs scored	6
Batting average	3.00
100s/50s	0/0
Top score	6
Balls bowled	162
Wickets	2
Bowling average	79.00
5 wickets in innings	0
10 wickets in match	0
Best bowling	1/29
Catches/stumpings	1/–
- Source: CricketArchive, 22 December 2015

Michael Bryant (born 5 April 1959) is an English cricketer who played first-class cricket for Somerset in 1982. He was born at Camborne, Cornwall.
