= John Hook =

English cricketer

Personal information
- Full name: John Stanley Hook
- Born: 27 May 1954 (age 72); Weston-super-Mare, Somerset, England
- Batting: Right-handed
- Bowling: Right-arm off-break

Domestic team information
- Years: Team
- 1975: Somerset

Career statistics
Competition	FC
Matches	1
Runs scored	7
Batting average	7.00
100s/50s	0/0
Top score	4*
Balls bowled	72
Wickets	0
Bowling average	–
5 wickets in innings	–
10 wickets in match	–
Best bowling	0/3
Catches/stumpings	0/–
- Source: CricketArchive, 22 December 2015

John Stanley Hook (born 27 May 1954) was an English cricketer. He was a right-handed batsman and right-arm off-break bowler who played for Somerset. He was born in Weston-super-Mare.

Hook played for Somerset's second eleven in the Minor Counties Championship from 1973 to 1975, and made a single first-class appearance for the first team, against Oxford University in 1975. From the lower order, he scored 4 not out in the first innings of the match and 3 runs in the second innings. In 12 overs, he failed to take a wicket.
