= Edward Page =

English cricketer

Personal information
- Full name: Edward William Page
- Born: 6 August 1864; Bradford-on-Tone, Somerset, England
- Died: 5 September 1946 (aged 82); Windsor, Berkshire, England

Domestic team information
- Years: Team
- 1885: Somerset County Cricket Club

Career statistics
| Competition | First-class |
|---|---|
| Matches | 1 |
| Runs scored | 1 |
| Batting average | 1.00 |
| 100s/50s | 0/0 |
| Top score | 1* |
| Balls bowled | 108 |
| Wickets | 0 |
| Bowling average | – |
| 5 wickets in innings | 0 |
| 10 wickets in match | 0 |
| Best bowling | 0/67 |
| Catches/stumpings | 0/– |
- Source: ESPNcricinfo, 12 November 2018

Edward William Page (6 August 1864 – 5 September 1946) was an English cricketer who played first-class cricket for Somerset County Cricket Club in 1885. He was born at Bradford on Tone, Somerset, and died at Windsor, Berkshire.

Page played as an amateur lower-order batsman and a bowler in his single match for Somerset, though neither his batting style nor his bowling style are recorded. The match, against Surrey at The Oval, was effectively decided on the first day, when Surrey scored 564 for seven wickets; in all Surrey totalled 635 and Page took no wickets for 67 runs in 27 (four-ball) overs. Page scored 1 in Somerset's first innings and was not out at the end of it; in the second, he was out without scoring.

By profession, Page was a schoolmaster; after teaching at several schools in Somerset, he moved in 1900 to Datchet, then in Buckinghamshire, as a headmaster, where he earned a reputation as a disciplinarian but also involved himself in other community activities, becoming chairman of the parish council.
