= Sam Ellis (cricketer) =

English cricketer (died 1946)

Personal information
- Full name: Samuel G. A. Ellis
- Born: 1870 or 1871
- Died: 26 March 1946 (aged 75); Portishead, Somerset, England
- Role: Batsman

Domestic team information
- Years: Team
- 1902: Somerset

Career statistics
| Competition | First-class |
|---|---|
| Matches | 1 |
| Runs scored | 5 |
| Batting average | 2.50 |
| 100s/50s | 0/0 |
| Top score | 5 |
| Catches/stumpings | 0/– |
- Source: CricketArchive, 6 January 2016

Samuel G. A. Ellis (Note: Ellis was incorrectly listed as "S. E. Ellis" on the match scorecard during his appearance for Somerset, and so is listed as such by modern databases. Contemporary reports, and his obituary confirm his identity.) (died 26 March 1946) was an English cricketer who played first-class cricket for Somerset County Cricket Club in 1902, and club cricket for Lodway Cricket Club in Pill, Somerset.

== Life and career ==
Sam Ellis was the fourth son of Thomas, a pilot at the ports of Cardiff and Bristol, and Sarah Ellis, and was born in either 1870 or 1871. Ellis's single appearance for Somerset came in the match against Lancashire at Old Trafford in June 1902, a tight match won by Somerset by just nine runs. Ellis batted at No 7 in the first innings and scored 5; in the second innings he was at No 9 and failed to score.
