= Frederick Jennings =

English cricketer

Personal information
- Full name: Frederick Lewis Bishop Jennings
- Born: 18 March 1874; Taunton, Somerset, England
- Died: 21 December 1946 (aged 72); Boscombe, Hampshire, England

Domestic team information
- Years: Team
- 1895: Somerset

Career statistics
Competition	FC
Matches	1
Runs scored	7
Batting average	3.50
100s/50s	0/0
Top score	7
Catches/stumpings	0/–
- Source: CricketArchive, 22 December 2015

Frederick Lewis Bishop Jennings (18 March 1874 – 21 December 1946) was an English cricketer who played for Somerset. He was born in Taunton, Somerset and died at Boscombe, Bournemouth, then in Hampshire.

Jennings played in just one game for Somerset, against Essex in 1895. Batting in the lower order, Jennings scored a duck in his first innings and seven runs in his second.
