= Hugo Hood =

English cricketer (1915-1968)

Ernest Hood
Personal information
- Full name: Ernest Hugo Meggeson Hood
- Born: 27 August 1915; Burnby, Pocklington, Yorkshire, England
- Died: 1 August 1968 (aged 52); Scarborough, Yorkshire, England
- Bowling: Left-arm (unknown style)

Domestic team information
- Years: Team
- 1935: Somerset

Career statistics
Competition	FC
Matches	1
Runs scored	6
Batting average	3.00
100s/50s	0/0
Top score	4
Balls bowled	78
Wickets	0
Bowling average	–
5 wickets in innings	–
10 wickets in match	–
Best bowling	0/43
Catches/stumpings	0/–
- Source: CricketArchive (subscription required), 22 December 2015

Ernest Hugo Meggeson Hood DSO, CdG (27 August 1915 – 1 August 1968) was an English war hero, schoolmaster and, for one game, a first-class cricketer. He was a left-arm bowler who played for Somerset. He was born at Burnby, Pocklington, Yorkshire and died in Scarborough.

== Cricket ==
Hood was educated at Wellington College, where he opened the bowling for the first-eleven cricket team and at Emmanuel College, Cambridge. It was while at Cambridge that he made a single first-class cricket appearance for Somerset during the 1935 season, against Cambridge University; he never played for the Cambridge eleven, and his qualification for Somerset (which would have been needed had he played in competitive games such as the County Championship) appears to be dubious. From the tailend, he scored 2 runs in the first innings in which he batted, and 4 runs in the second. He bowled 13 overs in the match, conceding 43 runs.

== Schoolmastering and war career ==
On graduation from Cambridge University, Hood became a school teacher in Somerset, and also joined the Somerset Light Infantry as a second lieutenant in the reservists. He was a captain at Gibraltar in 1942, but then transferred to be a member of the Special Operations Executive (SOE) which parachuted military personnel behind enemy lines to encourage local resistance and guerrilla activities and to prepare for an Allied forces advance. After a drop into the Balkans was abandoned, he joined Operation Jedburgh and was parachuted into France, near Dijon. Late in the Second World War, he took part in three similar missions in Burma (Myanmar) codenamed Operations Cheetah, Zebra and Mongoose; in the first of these he led his troops through 120 miles of jungle. He was awarded the Distinguished Service Order, and the citation stated that in Operation Cheetah he had inflicted 616 casualties on the enemy, losing only five of his own men in the process; he was also awarded the Croix de Guerre for his SOE work in France.

Hood retired from the British army with the rank of lieutenant-colonel; he applied for other public service jobs but his health was not good enough, though he remained on military reserve lists until 1965. Instead he returned to schoolmastering, teaching French and geography at Scarborough College and coaching the hockey and cricket teams; he was noted by his pupils as somewhat eccentric. He played cricket for Scarborough Cricket Club.

On 11 July 1968, he was knocked down by a car near the school where he taught, and he died from his injuries in hospital three weeks later.
