= Oswald Wright =

English cricketer

Oswald Walter Wright (20 March 1877 – 19 December 1933) played first-class cricket for Cambridge University in 1899 and Somerset in 1902. He was born at Maxton, Dover, Kent and died at Cheltenham, Gloucestershire.

Wright was educated at Malvern College and Selwyn College, Cambridge; at school he played for the first eleven at cricket and captained the soccer team. He played in two first-class cricket matches as a left-arm opening bowler while at Cambridge in 1899, taking one wicket in each of them; his better bowling figures, one for 16, and his highest first-class score of 14, made as a tail-end batsman, came in the first of these, the match against Surrey. He appeared in a single match for Somerset in 1902, batting at No 11 and failing to score in either innings; he bowled just two overs and did not take a wicket in this match.

The Malvern Register compiled in 1904 records Wright's family as living in Wickwar, Gloucestershire and that he was employed, after graduation, as an assistant master at a preparatory school, Stone House School, Broadstairs, Kent.
