= Edgar Ball =

English cricketer

Personal information
- Full name: Edgar Cedric Ball
- Born: 11 January 1892; Richmond upon Thames, Surrey, England
- Died: 15 May 1969 (aged 77); Vancouver, British Columbia, Canada
- Batting: Left-handed

Domestic team information
- Years: Team
- 1914: Somerset
- First-class debut: 11 June 1914 Somerset v Hampshire
- Last First-class: 6 July 1914 Somerset v Sussex

Career statistics
Competition	First-class
Matches	3
Runs scored	35
Batting average	5.83
100s/50s	0/0
Top score	20
Catches/stumpings	0/–
- Source: CricketArchive, 6 December 2009

Edgar Cedric Ball (11 January 1892 – 15 May 1969), was a former first-class cricketer who played three matches for Somerset County Cricket Club in 1914. He was a left-handed batsman who also played eight Minor Counties Cricket Championship matches for Devon between 1909 and 1912.

Ball frequently opened the batting for Devon during his eight matches, and it was while doing this that he made his top-score for the county, making 78 against Surrey Second XI. He played three matches for Somerset in the 1914 season, the only first-class matches of his career. After batting at number three in the first two matches, Ball dropped down the order to number seven for the third, and made his highest first-class total of 20.

In 1932, having moved to Canada, Ball played in four matches against the touring Australians, playing a match each for Cowichan and Vancouver, before representing British Columbia in two matches. In the last of the four matches, Donald Bradman made 171 for the tourists, surpassing the British Columbia first-innings total on his own.
