= John Hellard =

English cricketer

Personal information
- Full name: John Alexander Hellard
- Born: 20 March 1882; Stogumber, Somerset, England
- Died: 2 July 1916 (aged 34) near Beaumont-Hamel, France
- Batting: Right-handed
- Bowling: Right-arm fast-medium

Domestic team information
- Years: Team
- 1907–1910: Somerset

Career statistics
| Competition | First-class |
|---|---|
| Matches | 2 |
| Runs scored | 18 |
| Batting average | 6,00 |
| 100s/50s | 0/0 |
| Top score | 15 |
| Catches/stumpings | 0/– |
- Source: Cricinfo, 29 September 2014

John Alexander Hellard (20 March 1882 – 2 July 1916) played first-class cricket for Somerset in 1907 and 1910. He was born in Stogumber, Somerset and died in the First World War fighting on the Somme at Beaumont Hamel, France.

Educated at The King's School, Canterbury, Hellard was a right-handed lower-order batsman and a right-arm fast-medium bowler, although he did not bowl in first-class cricket. He played in two matches, both against Worcestershire, one in 1907 at Bath, the other in 1910 at Worcester. His highest first-class score was 15 in the 1907 game.

A second lieutenant in the Somerset Light Infantry during the First World War, he was killed on the second day of the Battle of the Somme in 1916 and is commemorated at the Serre Road cemetery.
