= Albert Westcott =

English cricketer

Albert Harold Westcott (6 November 1870 – 6 February 1929) played first-class cricket for Somerset in six matches between 1894 and 1902. He was born at Bridgwater, Somerset and died at Salisbury, Wiltshire.

In first-class cricket, Westcott was a tail-end batsman and a very occasional bowler, though neither his batting nor his bowling style is known. He played once in 1894, four times in 1895 and then returned for a single match in 1902. In 11 first-class innings, he was not out six times, perhaps suggesting that he was a better batsman than he was given credit for. But his highest innings was just 14, made in the match against Surrey at The Oval in 1895, and he did not take a wicket in eight overs of bowling spread across three of his six games.
