= Bob Woolston =

English cricketer

Personal information
- Full name: Robert George Woolston
- Born: 23 May 1968 (age 58); Enfield, Middlesex, England
- Batting: Right-handed
- Bowling: Slow left-arm orthodox

Domestic team information
- Years: Team
- 1987: Somerset

Career statistics
Competition	FC
Matches	1
Runs scored	0
Batting average	0.00
100s/50s	0/0
Top score	0
Balls bowled	258
Wickets	2
Bowling average	53.50
5 wickets in innings	0
10 wickets in match	0
Best bowling	2/70
Catches/stumpings	0/–
- Source: CricketArchive, 22 December 2015

Bob Woolston (born 23 May 1968) was an English cricketer. He was a right-handed batsman and a left-arm slow bowler who played for Somerset. He was born in Enfield, London.

Woolston made one first-class appearance for Somerset during the 1987 season, having made Second XI appearances for Middlesex, Worcestershire and Somerset. In the only first-class innings in which he played, he was trapped LBW by Alan Warner.

Woolston made an appearance in a miscellaneous match against Glamorgan, though he did not contribute with either the bat or the ball.
