= George Burrington (cricketer) =

English cricketer

Personal information
- Full name: George Burrington
- Born: 5 July 1864; Tiverton, Devon, England
- Died: 22 January 1942 (aged 77); Newhaven, Sussex, England

Domestic team information
- Years: Team
- 1901–1902: Somerset

Career statistics
Competition	FC
Matches	3
Runs scored	40
Batting average	8.00
100s/50s	0/0
Top score	15
Catches/stumpings	1/–
- Source: CricketArchive, 22 December 2015

George Burrington (5 July 1864 – 22 January 1942) played first-class cricket for Somerset in 1901 and 1902. He was born at Tiverton, Devon and died at Newhaven, East Sussex.

In his first-class cricket career, Burrington was a lower-order batsman, though it is not known if he was right- or left-handed. He played in three first-class matches without making much impact, but one of his games was a remarkable victory for Somerset over a strong Yorkshire side in July 1901, in which Somerset trailed by 238 on the first innings but then made 630 in the second innings to win the match by 279 runs; Burrington contributed 11 to the first innings of 87 and 15, his highest first-class score, to the 630.

Burrington's club cricket was for Bridgwater Cricket Club.
