= Nicholas Boulton (cricketer) =

South African-born English cricketer (born 1979)

Cricket information
- Batting: Left-handed
- Bowling: Right-arm medium

Domestic team information
- Years: Team
- 1997: Somerset
- 2001: Worcestershire

Career statistics
Competition	First-class	List A
Matches	5	7
Runs scored	90	93
Batting average	12.85	18.60
100s/50s	0/0	0/0
Top score	47	39
Balls bowled	102	–
Wickets	0	–
Bowling average	–	–
5 wickets in innings	–	–
10 wickets in match	–	–
Best bowling	–	–
Catches/stumpings	1/0	0/0
- Source: Cricinfo, 16 August 2022

Nicholas Ross Boulton (born 22 March 1979) is a South African-born English cricketer. He was born in Johannesburg, but has played all his important cricket in England.

Boulton started playing for Somerset's second XI in 1995, and an innings of 112 against Glamorgan II in July 1997 won him promotion two weeks later to make his first-class debut in the tour match against Pakistan A. He made scores of 1 and 14, and immediately returned to the seconds, where he spent two and a half more frustrating years before being released at the end of the 1999 season.

For the 2000 season, Boulton moved to Worcestershire, but again he could not force his way into the first team. The following summer was a different story, he played five List A games in May alone. He did not grasp that opportunity, however, making 22*, 4, 6*, 1 and 1, and he was once more dropped. He did play another two one-day and four first-class games that season, but in none of them did he produce the sizeable scores he had made in the second team, and Worcestershire released him at the end of the year.
