= Ellis Whately =

English cricketer

Ellis George Whately MC (27 July 1882 – 4 September 1969) played first-class cricket for Oxford University and Somerset between 1902 and 1905. He was born in Kensington, London and died at Chelsea, London.

== School cricket ==
Whately was educated at Eton College where he played in the cricket team in 1900 and 1901 as a right-handed middle-order batsman and a right-arm off-spin bowler. In the Eton v Harrow match of 1900 at Lord's, he took three Harrow wickets in the first innings and five in the second, including a hat-trick. In 1901 he was Eton's captain and scored 45 and 40 in the middle order as well as taking four wickets: Harrow, however, won the match by 10 wickets. In the same year, 1901, he started playing occasional Minor Counties matches for Hertfordshire County Cricket Club: the family home was at Harpenden in Hertfordshire.

== University cricket ==
Whately next went to New College, Oxford to study and was patentedly rated as a good prospect for the university cricket side in which he was given several games over the next four years. He played six times in 1902, but his batting was poor, with just 15 runs in eight innings, and whereas he started the season in middle order he was, by the end, a tail-ender. His bowling was more successful, and in the match against Kent he took five first innings wickets for 66 runs in a rain-ruined match, the only five-wicket haul of his first-class career. It was not sufficient to secure him his blue for cricket in 1902. The pattern was pretty much repeated in 1903: he played four matches for Oxford's first-class side, made a few more runs this time and took wickets at a better average, but not enough of either to win a blue. In 1904, he did not play for Oxford, but turned out for Somerset in the county side match, a first-class 12-a-side game, against Oxford University: it was a fairly commonplace arrangement for Somerset against university sides in the first third of the 20th century to "borrow" players from the university to bolster a side usually composed mainly of amateurs. Whately's qualification to play for Somerset is not clear, and this was his only game for the team, though he took two wickets and, with scores of 13 and 20, had his single most successful first-class match with the bat in what was, even by Somerset standards, a shambolic performance. He did not play for Oxford University in 1904, but returned for two final matches in 1905, his last games in first-class cricket, with no success.

== After cricket ==
After leaving Oxford, Whately joined the family firm of solicitors, Rooper and Whately, in which his father was, until 1936, also a partner. The practice was based at Lincoln's Inn Fields in central London.

At the start of the First World War, Whately joined the British Army as a second lieutenant in the 5th Battalion of the Gloucestershire Regiment, but in September 1914 he was transferred to the 1st Battalion, Hertfordshire Regiment, Territorial Force. Early in 1915, he was promoted to be a temporary lieutenant. In 1916, still ranked as a temporary lieutenant, he was attached to the headquarters staff replacing a captain, and by the end of 1916 he is cited as a temporary captain when being awarded the Military Cross in the New Year's Honours list of 1917. In mid-1917, Whately was appointed as a deputy assistant to the Adjutant-General to the Forces; his rank at this stage is still "2nd lieutenant (temporary captain)". In 1918, his rank was regularised and The London Gazette records a promotion from "captain (temporary major)" to brevet major. He was removed to the reserve list with the rank of captain and brevet major in 1921, and finally relinquished his commission in the territorials in 1932 at the age of 50.

== Personal life ==
In 1918, Whately married Rhoda Milburn in London. In 1923, Mrs Whately advertised for a parlourmaid for a household consisting of two people with four maids at Englefield Green; in 1936, the Whatelys have moved to Virginia Water and are looking for a butler to serve a family of five with nine servants in all, including a "pantryboy". The Whatelys had four children: two sons, Gerald and David, and two daughters, Daphne and Angela; by the time the younger son, David, was married in 1952 the Whatelys had moved into Chelsea with an address at Cadogan Square.

In his obituary in Wisden Cricketers' Almanack in 1970, his name is misspelled at "Whateley".
