= Frederick Baitup =

English cricketer

Personal information
- Full name: Frederick Henry Baitup
- Born: 9 January 1896; Tunbridge Wells, England
- Died: 3 February 1991 (aged 95); Leytonstone, England
- Batting: Right-handed
- Bowling: Right-arm fast-medium

Domestic team information
- Years: Team
- 1924: Somerset
- Only First-class: 21 June 1924 Somerset v Derbyshire

Career statistics
Competition	FC
Matches	1
Runs scored	11
Batting average	11
100s/50s	-/-
Top score	11
Balls bowled	12
Wickets	0
Bowling average	-
5 wickets in innings	0
10 wickets in match	0
Best bowling	-
Catches/stumpings	1/–
- Source: CricketArchive (subscription required), 20 August 2008

Frederick Henry Baitup (9 January 1896 – 3 February 1991) was an English cricketer who played for Somerset. He was born in Tunbridge Wells and died in Whipps Cross Hospital, Leytonstone.

Baitup made a single first-class appearance for Somerset, during the 1924 season, against Derbyshire at Burton-upon-Trent. Playing as a tailender, Baitup picked up eleven runs in the only innings in which he batted, as Somerset picked up an innings victory thanks to a century and a double-century from Jack MacBryan and Dar Lyon respectively. Baitup bowled two overs in Derbyshire's first innings, including one maiden, conceding eight runs. He also took one catch.

== Life and career ==
One of 12 children of an agricultural labourer, Fred Baitup was taken on to the ground staff of Kent County Cricket Club in 1913. After First World War service, he returned to the Kent ground staff, although he made no appearances for either the first or second teams, and left in 1922 to join Chard Cricket Club in Somerset as the club professional. Performances at Chard as a hard-hitting right-handed batsman and right-arm fast-medium bowler attracted the attention of Somerset, which offered him a one-year professional contract in 1924, during which he made his solitary first-class cricket appearance. After leaving Somerset, he played for several seasons in Lancashire league cricket.
