= Bill Montgomery (cricketer) =

English cricketer

Personal information
- Full name: William Montgomery
- Born: 4 March 1878; Staines, Middlesex, England
- Died: 14 November 1952 (aged 74); Peterborough, England
- Batting: Right-handed
- Bowling: Right-arm fast
- Role: All-rounder

Domestic team information
- Years: Team
- 1901–04: Surrey
- 1905–07: Somerset
- First-class debut: 6 May 1901 Surrey v London County
- Last First-class: 31 August 1907 Somerset v South Africans

Career statistics
Competition	First-class
Matches	24
Runs scored	234
Batting average	6.68
100s/50s	–/1
Top score	50
Balls bowled	1518
Wickets	25
Bowling average	27.48
5 wickets in innings	–
10 wickets in match	–
Best bowling	4/17
Catches/stumpings	13/–
- Source: CricketArchive, 7 February 2011

William Montgomery (4 March 1878 – 14 November 1952) played first-class cricket for Surrey and Somerset between 1901 and 1907. He was born at Staines, then in Middlesex and died at Peterborough.

Montgomery was a right-arm fast bowler and, in first-class cricket, a lower-order batsman, though he batted as an opener at times in other matches and in his games for Somerset he scarcely bowled at all. He was on the ground staff at The Oval from 1896 and appeared in Surrey second eleven matches from 1898, playing regularly in Minor Counties matches from 1899. He made his first-class cricket debut against W. G. Grace's London County in 1901, taking four wickets in the match, including Gilbert Jessop twice. But in the next game against Hampshire he failed to take a wicket and he disappeared from first-team cricket for two seasons. He returned to the Surrey side for five matches early in the 1903 season and in the first of these, a game ruined by rain against Warwickshire at Edgbaston he took four wickets for 17 runs, the best bowling figures of his career. There were seven further games for Montgomery at the end of the 1904 season, but he achieved little with either bat or ball, and joined Somerset for the 1905 season.

Not qualified for County Championship matches in 1905 or 1906, Montgomery's only match for Somerset in 1905 was the game against the Australian team at Bath, a match in which his former Surrey colleague, Tom Richardson, made his only appearance for Somerset. By the time he was qualified to play regularly in 1907, his bowling was almost gone and he took just three wickets in nine games, all of them in a single innings against the South Africans in his very last first-class game. His batting failed to compensate for the lack of wickets: he had his best ever season with the bat, averaging 10.12 and against Warwickshire at Bath he scored exactly 50, the only time in his first-class career that he reached this milestone. He did not play for Somerset after this 1907 season.

That was the end of Montgomery's first-class career, but he appeared in Minor Counties matches for Cheshire in 1911 and Hertfordshire in 1913. He was the cricket coach at Oundle School for around 30 years, retiring in 1946.
