= William Sloman =

English cricketer

William Henry Sloman (2 December 1871 – 10 August 1926) played first-class cricket for Somerset in four matches in 1895 and 1896. He was born in Launceston, Cornwall and died at South Molton, Devon.

A middle-order batsman, Sloman did well in two first-class matches against university sides in 1895. He scored 48 and 19 in the game against Cambridge University. A week later he made 7 and 15 and took one wicket (in two overs of bowling) against Oxford. But when he returned for two County Championship matches in 1896 he was not successful.

Cricketarchive has on its records a scorecard from a minor cricket match in 1894 between teams of licensed victuallers in which Sloman featured and where he was identified as coming from Minehead.
