= Edmund Paul =

English cricketer

Personal information
- Full name: Edmund Parris Paul
- Born: 4 February 1882; Taunton, Somerset, England
- Died: 26 April 1966 (aged 84); North Town, Taunton, Somerset, England
- Batting: Right-handed

Domestic team information
- Years: Team
- 1907–1910: Somerset

Career statistics
Competition	FC
Matches	4
Runs scored	37
Batting average	4.62
100s/50s	0/0
Top score	12
Catches/stumpings	2/–
- Source: CricketArchive, 22 December 2015

Edmund Paris Paul (4 February 1882 – 26 April 1966) played first-class cricket for Somerset in four matches between 1907 and 1910. He was born and died at Taunton, Somerset.

Paul was a right-handed batsman and a wicketkeeper, though in one match he played in for Somerset in the 1910 season he did not keep wicket. He made only 37 runs in eight first-class innings and took just two catches.
