= Arthur Paterson =

English cricketer and British army officer

Arthur William Sibbald Paterson DSO (28 February 1878 – 13 November 1937) was a British army officer who played first-class cricket for Somerset in two matches in the 1903 season.

He was born at Weston-super-Mare, Somerset and died at Burnham-on-Sea, also in Somerset.

== Military career ==
Paterson was commissioned a second lieutenant in the Prince Albert's (Somersetshire Light Infantry) on 16 February 1898, and was posted with the regiment's 2nd Battalion in South Africa during the Second Boer War (1899–1902). He was promoted to lieutenant on 7 January 1900, during the advance to relieve Ladysmith, where he took part in the battles of Spion Kop (20-24 January 1900) and the Tugela Heights (February 1900). From April 1900 until 1901 he served at the base depot. After the end of the war in June 1902, Paterson left Cape Town in the SS Bavarian in August, returning to Southampton the following month.

He later served in First World War, attached to the Royal Irish Fusiliers, and was appointed a Companion of the Distinguished Service Order (DSO) in 1917.
