= Wilfrid Kempe =

English cricketer

Personal information
- Full name: Wilfrid Noel Kempe
- Born: 10 October 1887; Long Ashton, Somerset, England
- Died: 17 October 1958 (aged 71); Frenchay, Gloucestershire, England

Domestic team information
- Years: Team
- 1919: Somerset

Career statistics
Competition	FC
Matches	1
Runs scored	9
Batting average	9.00
100s/50s	0/0
Top score	9
Catches/stumpings	0/1
- Source: CricketArchive (subscription required), 22 December 2015

Wilfrid Kempe (10 October 1887 – 17 October 1958) was an English cricketer. He was a wicket-keeper who played for Somerset. He was born in Long Ashton and died in Frenchay.

Kempe made a single first-class appearance for the team, during the 1919 season, against Derbyshire. He scored 9 runs in the first innings in which he batted. As the second innings ran to just two balls, he failed to score despite being placed in the opening order.
