= Harry Swayne (cricketer) =

English cricketer

Harry Walter Swayne (3 March 1869 – 25 November 1911) played first-class cricket for Somerset in 1894. He was born in Glastonbury, Somerset and he died at Mairwa in India.
