= Lionel Major =

English cricketer

Personal information
- Full name: Lionel Hugh Major
- Born: 21 April 1883; Wembdon, Somerset, England
- Died: 25 June 1965 (aged 82); Exmouth, Devon, England

Domestic team information
- Years: Team
- 1903: Somerset

Career statistics
Competition	FC
Matches	1
Runs scored	17
Batting average	8.50
100s/50s	0/0
Top score	11
Balls bowled	16
Wickets	1
Bowling average	5.00
5 wickets in innings	0
10 wickets in match	0
Best bowling	1/5
Catches/stumpings	0/–
- Source: CricketArchive (subscription required), 22 December 2015

Lionel Hugh Major (21 April 1883 – 25 June 1965) was an English cricketer who played for Somerset. He was born in Wembdon, Somerset and died in Exmouth, Devon.

Major made a single first-class appearance for the side, during the 1903 season, against Sussex. From the tailend, he scored 6 runs in the first innings in which he batted, and 11 runs in the second, and he took a single wicket in the Sussex second innings. Press reports for this match describe him as "an amateur from Bridgewater [sic]"; the Somerset side was missing several regular players.
