= Jack Conibere =

English cricketer

Personal information
- Full name: William John Conibere
- Born: 11 August 1923; Wiveliscombe, Somerset, England
- Died: 19 August 1982 (aged 59); Torquay, Devon, England
- Batting: Right-handed
- Bowling: Left-arm fast-medium
- Role: Bowler

Domestic team information
- Years: Team
- 1950: Somerset
- FC debut: 19 July 1950 Somerset v Warwickshire
- Last FC: 4 August 1950 Somerset v Yorkshire

Career statistics
Competition	First-class
Matches	4
Runs scored	16
Batting average	3.20
100s/50s	0/0
Top score	8
Balls bowled	444
Wickets	7
Bowling average	31.42
5 wickets in innings	0
10 wickets in match	0
Best bowling	4/66
Catches/stumpings	4/–
- Source: CricketArchive, 29 May 2010

William John "Jack" Conibere (11 August 1923 – 19 August 1982) played in four first-class cricket matches for Somerset in the 1950 season. He also played rugby union for the Somerset county side. He was born at Wiveliscombe, Somerset and died at Torquay, Devon.

As a cricketer, Conibere played as an amateur, and was a left-arm fast-medium bowler and a lower-order right-handed batsman. He was given a trial for Somerset in four consecutive County Championship matches in mid-season in 1950, but achieved real success in only the first of them, the game against Warwickshire at Edgbaston, when he took four wickets for 66 runs in Warwickshire's first innings and, with Bertie Buse and Maurice Tremlett, had half the side out for 47 before a recovery led by Tom Dollery. He took two further wickets in Warwickshire's second innings, but in his three further matches he took only one more wicket, and after two weeks his first-class cricket career was over.

A directory of Somerset's post-Second World War cricketers states that "he was probably a better rugby player, representing his county with typical zeal".
