= Thomas Wood (Somerset cricketer) =

English cricketer

Thomas Wood (2 June 1861 – 15 March 1933) was an English cricketer who played first-class cricket for Somerset in 1894. He was born at Leominster, Herefordshire and died at Potchefstroom, Transvaal, South Africa.

Wood was an opening or middle-order batsman who kept wicket on occasion for amateur Somerset sides in non-first-class matches between 1886 and 1894. In his one first-class appearance he batted in middle-order and did not keep wicket; he scored 11 in Somerset's only innings in the home match against Lancashire.
