= Boris Collingwood =

English cricketer

Personal information
- Full name: Boris Esmond Collingwood
- Born: 8 January 1920; Hither Green, London, England
- Died: 18 November 1968 (aged 48); Storrington, West Sussex, England
- Batting: Right-handed
- Role: Batsman

Domestic team information
- Years: Team
- 1948: Cambridge University
- 1953: Somerset
- FC debut: 19 May 1948 Cambridge Univ. v Northamptonshire
- Last FC: 13 August 1953 Somerset v Nottinghamshire

Career statistics
Competition	First-class
Matches	2
Runs scored	21
Batting average	7.00
100s/50s	0/0
Top score	15
Catches/stumpings	2/–
- Source: CricketArchive, 9 September 2008

Boris Esmond Collingwood (8 January 1920 – 18 November 1968), played first-class cricket in two matches, one each for Cambridge University and Somerset. He was born at Hither Green in 1920.

A schoolboy first-eleven cricketer at Dulwich College for four seasons before the Second World War and captain in 1939, Collingwood was 28 before the first of his first-class appearances for Cambridge came in the 1948 season. He also played for the university once in a non-first-class match that season.

Five years later, he turned out once for Somerset, at the time a very weak team, in a match at Weston-super-Mare against Nottinghamshire. He made 15 and 1 as Somerset subsided to an innings defeat in two days. He died at Storrington, West Sussex in 1968.
