= Walter Whiting =

English cricketer

Personal information
- Full name: Walter Sydney Whiting
- Born: 23 October 1888; Bath, Somerset, England
- Died: 15 January 1952 (aged 63); Bath, Somerset, England
- Batting: Right-handed
- Bowling: Right-arm leg-break
- Role: All-rounder/bowler

Domestic team information
- Years: Team
- 1921–1923: Somerset
- First-class debut: 28 May 1921 Somerset v Middlesex
- Last First-class: 6 July 1923 Somerset v Glamorgan

Career statistics
Competition	First-class
Matches	8
Runs scored	133
Batting average	14.77
100s/50s	–/–
Top score	28
Balls bowled	1134
Wickets	27
Bowling average	23.92
5 wickets in innings	–
10 wickets in match	–
Best bowling	4/28
Catches/stumpings	9/–
- Source: CricketArchive, 26 November 2010

Walter Sydney Whiting (23 October 1888 – 15 January 1952) was an English cricketer born in Bath, Somerset. He played first-class cricket for Somerset in four matches in the 1921 season and a further four in the 1923 season. He was born in Bath, Somerset and died there as well.

Whiting was an amateur right-handed batsman and leg-break bowler. In his eight matches for Somerset he batted in both the middle order and at the tail-end; as a bowler, he took at least one wicket in every opposition innings in the games he played. In his first game against Middlesex, he shared the first innings wickets with Jack White and then took the only two wickets to fall in the second innings. His figures of four for 28 remained the best of his first-class career, and his second innings of 28, when he top-scored for Somerset, was also his highest first-class score. Whiting played three further matches in 1921. His first match on his return in 1923, against Warwickshire, saw him take seven wickets, with four for 55 in the Warwickshire second innings. But after three further matches, his first-class career was over.
