= Nick Evans (cricketer) =

English cricketer (born 1954)

Personal information
- Full name: Nicholas John Evans
- Born: 9 September 1954 (age 72); Weston-super-Mare, Somerset, England
- Batting: Right-handed
- Bowling: Right-arm medium

Domestic team information
- Years: Team
- 1976: Somerset

Career statistics
Competition	FC
Matches	1
Runs scored	0
Batting average	0.00
100s/50s	0/0
Top score	0
Balls bowled	108
Wickets	0
Bowling average	–
5 wickets in innings	–
10 wickets in match	–
Best bowling	0/14
Catches/stumpings	0/–
- Source: CricketArchive, 22 December 2015

Nicholas John Evans (born 9 September 1954) is an English former cricketer. He was a right-handed batsman and a right-arm medium-pace bowler who played for Somerset. He was born in Weston-super-Mare.

== Career ==
Evans made a single first-class appearance for Somerset, during the 1976 season, having played in the Minor Counties Championship for the Somerset Second XI since 1972. Playing against Worcestershire, Evans scored a duck in the only innings in which he batted, and bowled 18 wicketless overs during the match. He continued to play in the Minor Counties Championship until 1978.

Evans released a memoir of his cricketing career in 2023 with proceeds going to charity.
