= Richard Selwyn Payne =

English cricketer

Richard Bethune Fripp Selwyn Payne (18 September 1885 – 1 February 1949) played first-class cricket for Somerset in one match in the 1906 season. He was born at Rangoon, now in Myanmar and died at Exmouth, Devon. In some sources, his third name is written as "Tripp"; in others, his last two names are hyphenated as "Selwyn-Payne".

Selwyn Payne's only first-class cricket came in the match against a feeble Hampshire at the United Services Ground, Portsmouth in 1906; he batted at No 10 in Somerset's only innings and made 15.

He was commissioned as a second lieutenant in the fourth battalion of the Somerset Light Infantry in 1907. Early in the First World War he was back in the Somerset Light Infantry in the seventh battalion, being promoted from temporary second lieutenant to temporary full lieutenant in October 1914. In November 1914 (though it was not gazetted correctly for four months), he was transferred from the Somerset Light Infantry to the Motor Machine Gun Service, which operated machine guns mounted on motorcycles. This division was transferred a year later to the bigger Machine Gun Corps and in 1916 Selwyn Payne was gazetted as a temporary captain within the Corps with seniority as a temporary lieutenant in the Somerset Light Infantry backdated retrospectively to September 1914. That appears to have been contradicted by a promotion to temporary captain within the Machine Gun Corps (Motor) backdated to March 1916 but not gazetted until 1919, when he was transferred to the Machine Gun Corps (Infantry) division. He left the army on 11 November 1919 and retained the rank of captain.
