= Montague Hambling =

English cricketer

Personal information
- Full name: Montague Leslie Hambling
- Born: 6 December 1893; Croydon, Surrey, England
- Died: 22 August 1960 (aged 66); Stoke Bishop, Bristol, England
- Batting: Right-handed
- Bowling: Right-arm fast
- Role: All-rounder

Domestic team information
- Years: Team
- 1920–27: Somerset
- First-class debut: 29 May 1920 Somerset v Cambridge University
- Last First-class: 23 June 1927 Somerset v Worcestershire

Career statistics
Competition	First-class
Matches	18
Runs scored	350
Batting average	13.46
100s/50s	–/2
Top score	59
Balls bowled	973
Wickets	24
Bowling average	20.54
5 wickets in innings	1
10 wickets in match	–
Best bowling	6/31
Catches/stumpings	16/–
- Source: CricketArchive, 31 October 2010

Montague Leslie Hambling (6 December 1893 – 22 August 1960) played first-class cricket for Somerset between 1920 and 1927. He was born at Croydon, then in Surrey, and died at Stoke Bishop, Bristol.

Hambling was a right-handed middle order batsman and a right-arm fast bowler. One of Somerset captain John Daniell's recruits for the 1920 matches against the universities, he took wickets and made a few runs against both Cambridge and Oxford. But it was in his first County Championship match against Warwickshire that Hambling's promise was revealed: he scored 59 and Somerset won the match by nine wickets. After missing several matches in mid-season, Hambling returned in July and against Worcestershire produced a score of 58, one short of his highest, and second innings bowling figures of six wickets for 31 runs, finishing off the Worcestershire innings early on the third morning of the three-day fixture.

This proved however to be the high point of Hambling's cricket career. He returned to Somerset for a handful of matches in 1921, 1922, 1925 and 1927, but with no success, and after 1921 he seldom bowled.
