= Ulick Considine =

English cricketer and rugby union footballer

Personal information
- Full name: Stanley George Ulick Considine
- Born: 11 August 1901; Bilaspur, Punjab Province, British India
- Died: 31 August 1950 (aged 49); Bath, Somerset, England
- Batting: Right-handed
- Role: Batsman

Domestic team information
- Years: Team
- 1919–1935: Somerset
- FC debut: 8 August 1919 Somerset v Hampshire
- Last FC: 5 July 1935 Somerset v South Africans

Career statistics
Competition	First-class
Matches	89
Runs scored	2,965
Batting average	21.33
100s/50s	1/16
Top score	130*
Catches/stumpings	42/–
- Source: CricketArchive, 26 December 2009

Stanley George Ulick Considine (11 August 1901 – 31 August 1950) was a first-class cricketer who played as an amateur for Somerset in the 1920s. He was born at Bilaspur in British India.

Considine was also a rugby union player, appearing at stand-off half for Bath, Somerset and, once, for England in France in 1925, though in his one international appearance he played on the wing. He was badly injured in that match and, according to one report, his enthusiasm for sport of all kinds diminished after that.

Educated at Blundell's School, Considine first played cricket for Somerset in 1919, and in 1921 and 1922 was a regular member of the side as a right-handed middle order batsman and a fine cover fielder. His one century was an unbeaten 130 in the match against Worcestershire at Taunton in July 1921. His best season was 1922, when he scored 973 runs and came third in Somerset's batting averages. Wisden wrote of him: "He is so young that if he can spare time to keep up the game he ought to have a bright future."

Considine's appearances became less frequent and after the mid-1920s he rarely played though his final match was not until 1935. He was a solicitor in Bath, like several other Somerset amateurs of the time, such as Reggie Ingle and Bunty Longrigg. In the Second World War he was a squadron leader in the Royal Air Force. He died in 1950 at Bath, Somerset, where he was a member of the Bath and County Club.
