= Oswald Samson =

English cricketer

Personal information
- Full name: Oswald Massey Samson
- Born: 8 August 1881; Taunton, Somerset, England
- Died: 7 September 1918 (aged 37) near Peronne, Somme, France
- Batting: Left-handed
- Bowling: Left-arm orthodox spin
- Role: Batsman

Domestic team information
- Years: Team
- 1900–1913: Somerset
- 1902–1903: Oxford University
- First-class debut: 14 June 1900 Somerset v Oxford University
- Last First-class: 13 August 1913 Somerset v Sussex

Career statistics
| Competition | First-class |
|---|---|
| Matches | 49 |
| Runs scored | 1464 |
| Batting average | 18.30 |
| 100s/50s | 1/7 |
| Top score | 105 |
| Balls bowled | 102 |
| Wickets | 5 |
| Bowling average | 17.60 |
| 5 wickets in innings | – |
| 10 wickets in match | – |
| Best bowling | 2/4 |
| Catches/stumpings | 32/– |
- Source: CricketArchive, 19 June 2010

Oswald Massey Samson (8 August 1881 – 7 September 1918) played first-class cricket for Somerset from 1900 to 1913. He also played for Oxford University in 1902 and 1903, winning his blue in 1903. He was born at Taunton, Somerset and died of his wounds near Peronne, in Somme département, France. In the legal notice for the execution of his will in the London Gazette in 1919, his date of death is given as 17 September 1918, and his address as 41 Hillmorton Road, Rugby, Warwickshire.

== Education ==
Samson was educated at Cheltenham College and at Hertford College, Oxford, where he took a double first in mathematics.

== Cricket career ==
Samson was a left-handed batsman mostly, though not exclusively, used as an opening batsman, and an occasional slow left-arm orthodox spin bowler. He first appeared for Somerset at the age of 18 in the match against Oxford University in 1900, and his second match was the same fixture a year later, when he made 58 in the second innings. In the space of a week early in the 1902 season, Samson played in two first-class matches of 12-a-side in The Parks, Oxford, one of them for Oxford University (against H. D. G. Leveson Gower's team) and one of them for Somerset against Oxford University. The first of these was the only match he played for Oxford that season, though he appeared in County Championship matches for Somerset later that season. In 1903, he played in his fourth consecutive Oxford University v Somerset fixture, but this time appearing for the university. He then played for Somerset in Championship games before reappearing for Oxford in the match against Marylebone Cricket Club (MCC) immediately before the University match; in the MCC game, he failed to score in either innings, but he was still picked for the University match against Cambridge University, where he batted at No 8 and scored 8 and an undefeated 32. The University match was the only one of Samson's four first-class games for Oxford University that was not 12-a-side.

In-between his university appearances, Samson had hit the only century of his first-class cricket career for Somerset in the match against Gloucestershire at Gloucester; the century, 105, came after Gloucestershire had been dismissed for just 61, and Beaumont Cranfield and Len Braund bowled unchanged through the two Gloucestershire innings. He played fairly regularly for Somerset in the rest of the 1903 season, but did not reach 50 in any other innings.

Samson then was appointed as an assistant master at Rugby School and disappeared from first-class cricket for four years. He returned to Somerset in a single match in 1908; he then appeared as a middle-order batsman in a few matches for Somerset towards the end of each of the next few seasons during the school holidays, his final appearance being in 1913. In 1910, he reached 50 three times in six matches.

== War service ==
Samson was commissioned as a second lieutenant in the Royal Garrison Artillery in the First World War. He was temporarily promoted to a full lieutenant in June 1917. He died from wounds received in September 1918.
