= Robert Draper (cricketer) =

English cricketer

Personal information
- Full name: Robert William Draper
- Born: 20 January 1903; Calcutta (now Kolkata), Bengal, India
- Died: 29 August 1987 (aged 84); Cowie's Hill, Durban, Natal, South Africa
- Batting: Right-handed
- Bowling: Left-arm medium pace

Domestic team information
- Years: Team
- 1925–1929: Somerset

Career statistics
| Competition | FC |
|---|---|
| Matches | 3 |
| Runs scored | 20 |
| Batting average | 4.00 |
| 100s/50s | 0/0 |
| Top score | 11 |
| Balls bowled | 505 |
| Wickets | 6 |
| Bowling average | 36.83 |
| 5 wickets in innings | 0 |
| 10 wickets in match | 0 |
| Best bowling | 3/73 |
| Catches/stumpings | 2/– |
- Source: CricketArchive, 22 December 2015

Robert William Draper (20 January 1903 – 29 August 1987) played first-class cricket for Somerset in three matches, two in the 1925 season and one in 1929. He was born at Calcutta, India and died at Cowie's Hill, Durban, South Africa.

Draper was a left-arm medium pace bowler and a tail-end batsman. He opened the Somerset bowling in each of his three matches for the team, and took three wickets in an innings in both of his matches in the 1925 season; however, both Cambridge University and Essex scored more than 400 in the innings where Draper took wickets. His single game in 1929, against Northamptonshire, was not a success: he failed to take a wicket or score a run.

Draper's record as a batsman was negligible: he scored 20 runs in four innings. It is not clear whether he batted right- or left-handed. His obituary in Wisden Cricketers' Almanack in 1988 says left-handed; his Cricketarchive profile says right.
