= Montague Sturt =

English cricketer

Montague Alfred Sliney Sturt DSO (11 November 1876 – 16 January 1961) played first-class cricket for Somerset in 10 matches between 1896 and 1910. He was born at Sunderland, then in Co. Durham and died at Buckland, Dover, Kent.

Sturt was a right-handed lower-order batsman. His first-class cricket career was episodic: three matches in 1896, one in 1897, four more in 1905 and a final two in 1910. He occasionally made some runs, but his highest first-class score was only 35, made in the match against Lancashire in 1905. His bowling style is not recorded and he took only one first-class wicket. Before and after the First World War he played club cricket in London for Hampstead.

Sturt joined the Army Service Corps at the start of the First World War as a lieutenant. In the New Year Honours of 1918, he was awarded the Distinguished Service Order and at this stage he was a temporary major within the ASC.
