= Charles J. Bowring =

English cricketer

Charles Bowring
Personal information
- Full name: Charles James Bowring
- Born: 27 August 1887; Portland, Dorset, England
- Died: 16 January 1959 (aged 71); Yeovil, Somerset, England

Domestic team information
- Years: Team
- 1913: Somerset
- First-class debut: 30 June 1913 Somerset v Yorkshire
- Last First-class: 18 August 1913 Somerset v Hampshire

Career statistics
Competition	First-class
Matches	4
Runs scored	42
Batting average	6.00
100s/50s	0/0
Top score	15
Balls bowled	37
Wickets	3
Bowling average	8.66
5 wickets in innings	0
10 wickets in match	0
Best bowling	3/24
Catches/stumpings	0/–
- Source: CricketArchive, 12 June 2014

Charles James Bowring (27 August 1887 – 16 January 1959) made four first-class appearances as a professional cricketer for Somerset in the 1913 cricket season.

Used as an opening or middle order batsman, Bowring, who was born at Portland, Dorset, made little impact, failing to reach double figures until his last first-class innings, when he made 15 against Hampshire at Portsmouth. In the previous match, against Kent at Taunton he took three wickets for 24 runs in 31 balls, his only first-class wickets.

Bowring died at Preston, near Yeovil.
