= Horace Hazell =

English cricketer

Personal information
- Full name: Horace Leslie Hazell
- Born: 30 September 1909; Brislington, Somerset, England
- Died: 31 March 1990 (aged 80); Brislington, Somerset, England
- Batting: Left-handed
- Bowling: Slow left-arm orthodox
- Role: Bowler

Domestic team information
- Years: Team
- 1929–1952: Somerset
- FC debut: 8 June 1929 Somerset v Gloucestershire
- Last FC: 20 August 1952 Somerset v Hampshire

Career statistics
Competition	First-class
Matches	350
Runs scored	2,280
Batting average	8.17
100s/50s	0/0
Top score	43
Balls bowled	56,800
Wickets	957
Bowling average	23.97
5 wickets in innings	57
10 wickets in match	7
Best bowling	8/27
Catches/stumpings	248/–
- Source: CricketArchive, 16 October 2009

Horace Leslie Hazell (30 September 1909 – 31 March 1990) was a cricketer who played for Somerset County Cricket Club in English first-class cricket.

A slow left-arm orthodox bowler and tail-end left-handed batsman, Hazell made his Somerset debut in 1929, and played fairly regularly from 1932 onwards. In pre-war cricket he was, though, inclined to be expensive and his figures suggest that he was under-bowled by the standards of the day. Only in 1936, when he took 87 wickets at an average of just over 21 runs apiece, did he suggest more than ordinary talent.

Returning after being in the RAF during the Second World War, Hazell developed into a highly accurate bowler who achieved success by pinning the batsmen down rather than through any great spin. For Somerset against Gloucestershire in 1949, he bowled 105 balls without conceding a run, including 17 consecutive maiden overs. He took 105 wickets in 1948 and 106 in 1949, in both seasons averaging less than 20 runs per wicket, and was still an effective bowler into his early 40s. At the end of Somerset's disastrous 1952 season, however, when he had again come top of the county's bowling averages, he was not re-engaged.

In his full career, Hazell took 957 wickets at 23.97. He was a slip fielder and a rotund figure.
