= Michael Bennett (cricketer) =

English cricketer (1909–1982)

Personal information
- Full name: Geoffrey Michael Bennett
- Born: 17 December 1909; Bruton, Somerset, England
- Died: 26 July 1982 (aged 72); Toronto, Ontario, Canada
- Batting: Right-handed
- Bowling: Right-arm medium
- Role: Batsman

Domestic team information
- Years: Team
- 1928–1939: Somerset
- FC debut: 18 August 1928 Somerset v Essex
- Last FC: 3 August 1939 Somerset v West Indians

Career statistics
Competition	First-class
Matches	109
Runs scored	2,330
Batting average	15.32
100s/50s	0/12
Top score	73
Balls bowled	753
Wickets	14
Bowling average	32.00
5 wickets in innings	0
10 wickets in match	0
Best bowling	4/39
Catches/stumpings	53/–
- Source: ESPNCricinfo, 25 November 2009

Geoffrey Michael Bennett (17 December 1909 – 26 July 1982) played first-class cricket for Somerset between 1928 and 1939.

Bennett was born at Bruton, Somerset. A right-handed middle-order batsman and an occasional right-arm medium pace bowler, Bennett was one of the more regular of Somerset's amateur batsmen in an era when the county could afford only half a dozen professional players. In 12 seasons, he played 109 matches for Somerset, turning out regularly in 1932 and 1934, and playing in around half the side's matches in three other seasons: 1933, 1937 and 1939. In no other season did he appear in more than three matches. Despite this regular cricket and the fact that he was played primarily as a batsman, Bennett was not a prolific scorer at any stage in his career: his career average was only 15 and his highest score was just 73. Only in 1934, when he made 735 runs at an average of 19.86, did he make more than two scores of more than 50 in any single season.

Bennett was a good schoolboy all-rounder at King's School, Bruton, making 565 runs at an average of 40.35 and taking 58 wickets at 13.56 in his final school season, 1928. He played for Somerset in three late-season matches that year, and three more in 1929, without making much impact. He did not play in 1930 or 1931.

In 1932, Bennett played in every Somerset match, making 544 runs at an average of 15.54. He scarcely bowled at all, with just 7.3 overs in the season, and at times in a fairly mobile batting line-up he came in as low as No 10 in the batting order. Nonetheless, Wisden Cricketers' Almanack, summarising the Somerset season, noted that he "accomplished enough as a batsman to keep his place in the side". His one score of more than 50 in the season came in the final home match of the season at Taunton: he made 69 batting at No 8, but his innings was upstaged by centuries for Reggie Ingle and Dickie Burrough and a very fast 50 from Arthur Wellard.

Bennett played less in 1933. His aggregate fell to just 233 runs and his batting average to 12.94. But he returned to regular county cricket in 1934 and, said Wisden, "made a number of useful scores". These included innings of 71 and 73 in the match against Gloucestershire at Bath, the second of these being his highest first-class score. Wisden noted that he "timed his driving specially well" in the first innings and "again displayed capital skill" in the second. In the season as a whole, he made 735 runs. His bowling remained very occasional, but in the last match of the season against Nottinghamshire, he took four wickets for 39 runs in 11 overs, and these remained the best bowling figures of his career.

In both 1935 and 1936, Bennett barely played at all, but he came back to the Somerset side in 1937, playing in most of the matches in the first two-thirds of the season. He passed 50 twice, with the higher innings being 62 against Gloucestershire at Taunton, but his aggregate for the season was only 292 runs and his average was just 13.90. He was absent for most of 1938, but came back for a final season in 1939, when he played in half of Somerset's matches and captained the side in the temporary absence of the regular captain, Bunty Longrigg, in games in early July. Mostly he batted a long way down the batting order and it was from No 9 that he made his highest of the season, 72 against Kent at Maidstone, an innings described by Wisden as "dashing" – though Somerset still lost the match easily inside two days. His final Somerset match, a month before the outbreak of the Second World War, was against the West Indians; Bennett scored 56 in Somerset's only innings as the county beat the touring side by an innings in less than two days. He did not appear in first-class cricket again.

== Later life ==
Bennett went into the Army in the Second World War, emerging with the rank of lieutenant. He transferred from the army reserve to a short commission in the Devon Regiment after the war. He was promoted to captain in 1947 and major in 1953. He left the army in 1961, later moving to Canada. He died at Toronto, Ontario, Canada.
