= Wally Luckes =

English cricketer

Personal information
- Full name: Walter Thomas Luckes
- Born: 1 January 1901; Lambeth, London, England
- Died: 27 October 1982 (aged 81); Bridgwater, Somerset, England
- Batting: Right-handed
- Role: Wicket-keeper

Domestic team information
- Years: Team
- 1924–1949: Somerset
- First-class debut: 31 May 1924 Somerset v Sussex
- Last First-class: 22 June 1949 Somerset v Cambridge University

Career statistics
Competition	First-class
Matches	365
Runs scored	5,710
Batting average	16.22
100s/50s	1/12
Top score	121*
Catches/stumpings	588/240
- Source: CricketArchive, 8 June 2011

Walter Thomas "Wally" Luckes (/ˈlʌkiːz/; 1 January 1901 in Lambeth, London – 27 October 1982 at Bridgwater, Somerset), was a cricketer who played for Somerset.

Born on the first day of the 20th century, Luckes was a lower-order right-handed batsman and a sound wicketkeeper who played for Somerset for a quarter of a century. An undemonstrative player who made his reputation by conceding very few byes in large totals compiled by stronger teams, Luckes started slowly in terms of the numbers of dismissals, but developed into one of the leading keepers of his day, high in the fielding statistics tables for several seasons.

Luckes made his debut in 1924, and became Somerset's regular wicketkeeper in 1927. However, after two seasons, he suffered serious heart trouble before the start of the 1929 season. Despite expectations he would not play at all in 1929, Luckes resumed playing club cricket for Bridgwater in July, and played for the county in all the August matches. At the beginning of 1930 Luckes said he felt "wonderfully fit". However, after playing six matches, an attack of influenza from the previous winter recurred and this was followed by a recurrence of Luckes' heart trouble. Consequently, doctors forbade Luckes playing during the 1931 season, although he did play Saturday games for Bridgwater.

The high regard that Somerset had for Luckes was reflected by the fact that he was maintained on the staff during this long absence: for one of the perennially more cash-strapped counties, with one of the smaller playing staffs, this was a rare degree of commitment. Somerset used a variety of amateur and professional wicketkeepers in Luckes' absence, including Seymour Clark, the ultimate non-batsman, and Frank Lee, the opening batsman who later became a Test umpire. Luckes was able to return for the second half of the 1932 season, and then remained as the regular wicketkeeper for the county up to and beyond the Second World War, standing up at the wicket to all but the fastest deliveries from Arthur Wellard and Bill Andrews and even in his last match, at the age of 48, managing a stumping off the quick bowler Jim Redman.

Luckes was a useful batsman, but after his illness Somerset appear to have decided that he should not be subjected to the stress of batting high in the order, despite an at-times lack of depth to the county's batting. That decision accounts for the very high proportion of "not out" innings – 212 out of 564 in all – in Luckes' career figures. Occasionally, he was allowed to bat higher and in 1937, against Kent at Bath, batting at No 5, he made 121 not out, the only first-class century of his career.

Luckes returned to first-class cricket after the Second World War and set a county record with 77 dismissals in 1946. But at the end of the 1948 season, with Luckes now 47, Somerset recruited Harold Stephenson from Durham, and Stephenson took over the wicketkeeping role after a few games of the 1949 season, going on to break Luckes' county record in his first year.

== Sources ==
- Sunshine, Sixes and Cider: a History of Somerset Cricket, by David Foot (David & Charles, 1986).
