= Somerset County Cricket Club in 1948 =

1948 season of an English cricket team

Somerset County Cricket Club
1948 season
- Captain: Mandy Mitchell-Innes, Jake Seamer, George Woodhouse
- County Championship: 12th (of 17)
- Most runs: Harold Gimblett (1,741)
- Most wickets: Horace Hazell (92)
- Most catches: Maurice Tremlett (26)
- Most wicket-keeping dismissals: Wally Luckes (55)

In the 1948 season, Somerset County Cricket Club competed in the County Championship, finishing twelfth out of seventeen teams. They were officially captained by three amateurs through the season; initially by Mandy Mitchell-Innes; then by Jake Seamer; and finally by George Woodhouse. The strains on consistent leadership were reflected in Somerset's variable form: after failing to win their first eight matches. Somerset did not win, lose or draw twice in consecutive matches in their following eight matches. In all, they won five times that season, and depended heavily upon the batting of Harold Gimblett, who scored 1,741 runs, and was Somerset's only player to score a century.

Other than Gimblett, only two Somerset batsmen scored over 1,000 runs in the County Championship, Bertie Buse and Miles Coope, but both players did so at a significantly lower average. The team's bowling was led Horace Hazell, who claimed 92 wickets in the Championship. Maurice Tremlett, who had been highly praised for his performance on debut in 1947 continued to show promise, scoring over 1,000 first-class runs in all first-class matches and claiming 86 wickets, positioning himself as the county's leading all-rounder.

== Background ==
County cricket had sojourned during the Second World War, and only returned in 1946. Most of the players had seen war service in some form or another, and very few of them had played much cricket of any form, which resulted in a temporary drop in quality. As most of the players were the same as those from before the war, it also meant that the average age of a county cricketer was higher than usual. The social change that was occurring all around Great Britain also had an effect on county cricket, and at Somerset it resulted in their professional players gathering together to ask for better playing conditions and greater pay. Despite these changes, and the relative weakness of amateur players in comparison to the professionals, Somerset, as like many other counties, insisted on naming amateurs as captains. In 1946, Bunty Longrigg, who had captained Somerset before the war had resumed his duties, but he retired at the end of the season as was replaced by Jack Meyer for 1947. Meyer had reluctantly agreed to captain the side in the absence of any other candidates, but stepped down at the end of his single season, citing his fading eyesight and lumbago.

Somersetshire will be captained by three amateurs in rotation, N. S. Mitchell-Innes in May, J. W. Seamer in June and part of July and G. E. S. Woodhouse for the rest of the season.

—Manchester Guardian, 1948

As a result of Meyer's resignation, the Somerset committee was once more required to recruit a captain for the following season. Still limiting themselves by requiring an amateur to take on the role—Somerset would not appoint a professional captain until 1956— the committee found that there was no player "of a suitable pedigree who could make himself available for the whole summer." So, with no single candidate suitable, the Somerset committee announced that the club would be captained by three players; first by Mandy Mitchell-Innes and then by Jake Seamer during their respective periods of leave from the Sudan Political Service. Once both of these had returned to their duties, George Woodhouse would take over. In his history of Somerset County Cricket Club, Peter Roebuck describes the situation as a "remarkable state of affairs", while David Foot suggests that the true number of captains was closer to seven.

== Squad ==
The following players made at least one appearance for Somerset in first-class matches. Age given is at the start of Somerset's first match of the season (5 May 1948).

Key

- † denotes that the player appeared as a wicket-keeper for Somerset in 1948
- Apps denotes the number of appearances made by the player for Somerset in 1948
- Ref denotes the reference for the player details

Name	Nationality	Birth date	Batting style	Bowling style	Apps	Ref
Les Angell	England	29 June 1922 (aged 25)	Right-handed	—	2	
John Barnwell	England	23 June 1914 (aged 33)	Right-handed	Right-arm medium	1	
Paddy Bucklan	England	24 September 1916 (aged 31)	Left-handed	Left-arm fast-medium	1	
Bertie Buse	England	5 August 1910 (aged 37)	Right-handed	Right-arm medium	28	
Fred Castle	England	8 April 1909 (aged 39)	Right-handed	Right-arm leg break	5	
Miles Coope	England	28 November 1916 (aged 31)	Right-handed	Right-arm leg break	29	
Harold Gimblett	England	19 October 1914 (aged 33)	Right-handed	Right-arm medium	23	
Peter Graham	England	27 December 1920 (aged 27)	Right-handed	Right-arm fast	6	
Horace Hazell	England	30 September 1909 (aged 38)	Left-handed	Left-arm orthodox spin	29	
Eric Hill	England	9 July 1923 (aged 24)	Right-handed	—	22	
Trevor Jones	England	9 April 1920 (aged 28)	Right-handed	Right-arm leg break	2	
George Langdale	England	11 March 1916 (aged 32)	Left-handed	Right-arm off break	4	
Johnny Lawrence	England	29 March 1911 (aged 37)	Right-handed	Right-arm leg break and googly	24	
Wally Luckes †	England	1 January 1901 (aged 47)	Right-handed	—	27	
Jack Meyer	England	15 March 1905 (aged 43)	Right-handed	Right-arm slow-medium	2	
Mandy Mitchell-Innes (captain)	England	7 September 1914 (aged 33)	Right-handed	Right-arm medium	5	
Jim Redman	England	1 March 1926 (aged 22)	Right-handed	Right-arm fast-medium	2	
Stuart Rogers	England	18 March 1923 (aged 25)	Right-handed	—	7	
Jake Seamer (captain)	England	23 June 1913 (aged 34)	Right-handed	Right-arm leg break and googly	11	
Harold Stephenson †	England	18 July 1920 (aged 27)	Right-handed	—	8	
Michael Sutton	England	29 March 1921 (aged 27)	Right-handed	Right-arm off break	1	
Maurice Tremlett	England	5 July 1923 (aged 24)	Right-handed	Right-arm fast-medium	28	
Tony Vickery	England	26 August 1925 (aged 22)	Right-handed	—	3	
Micky Walford	England	27 November 1915 (aged 32)	Right-handed	Left-arm orthodox spin	4	
Hugh Watts	England	4 March 1922 (aged 26)	Left-handed	Right-arm leg break	10	
Arthur Wellard	England	8 April 1902 (aged 46)	Right-handed	Right-arm off break, Right-arm fast-medium	21	
George Woodhouse (captain)	England	15 February 1924 (aged 24)	Right-handed	Right-arm medium	14	
Compiled from County Championship batting statistics, and three other matches, against Glamorgan, Oxford University, and the Australians.

== County Championship ==
=== Season standings ===
Note: Pld = Played, W = Wins, L = Losses, LWF = Lost but won on 1st innings, DW1 = Won on 1st innings in drawn match played under 1-day rules, DL1 = Lost on 1st innings in drawn match played under 1-day rules, DWF = Won on 1st innings in drawn match, DLF = Lost on 1st innings in drawn match, ND = No Decision on 1st innings, Pts = Points, (C) = Champions.

Team	Pld	W	L	LWF	DW1	DL1	DWF	DLF	ND	Pts
Glamorgan (C)	26	13	4	1	0	0	3	3	2	172
Surrey	26	12	8	1	1	0	3	1	0	168
Middlesex	26	13	4	0	0	0	1	7	1	160
Yorkshire	26	11	1	3	0	0	3	7	1	156
Lancashire	26	8	2	0	0	0	14	1	1	152
Derbyshire	26	11	6	0	0	0	4	3	2	148
Warwickshire	26	9	6	1	0	0	5	3	2	132
Gloucestershire	26	9	5	1	0	1	4	5	1	128
Hampshire	26	9	6	2	0	0	1	7	1	120
Worcestershire	26	6	7	1	0	0	7	4	1	104
Leicestershire	26	6	10	1	0	0	5	3	1	96
Somerset	26	5	10	4	0	0	4	2	1	92
Essex	26	5	6	2	0	0	4	7	2	84
Nottinghamshire	26	5	9	1	0	0	4	5	2	80
Kent	26	4	11	0	0	0	7	3	1	76
Sussex	26	4	10	1	0	0	5	5	1	72
Northamptonshire	26	3	8	1	0	0	3	11	0	52
Source: CricketArchive

=== Match log ===
No.	Date	Opponents	Venue	Result	Ref
1	8–11 May	Derbyshire	County Ground, Taunton	Lost by 4 wickets	
2	15–18 May	Gloucestershire	County Ground, Taunton	Lost by an innings and 58 runs	
3	19–21 May	Middlesex	Lord's, London	Lost by 10 wickets	
4	22–25 May	Glamorgan	St. Helen's, Swansea	Lost by 137 runs	
5	29 May–1 June	Warwickshire	Rowdens Road, Wells	Drawn	
6	2–3 June	Essex	County Ground, Taunton	Lost by 9 wickets	
7	5–7 June	Derbyshire	Rutland Recreation Ground, Ilkeston	Lost by 11 runs	
8	9–11 June	Yorkshire	St George's Road, Harrogate	Drawn	
9	12–15 June	Worcestershire	New Road, Worcester	Won by 3 wickets	
10	19–22 June	Hampshire	Recreation Ground, Bath	Lost by 36 runs	
11	26–29 June	Nottinghamshire	Recreation Ground, Bath	Won by an innings and 25 runs	
12	30 June–1 July	Lancashire	Aigburth, Liverpool	Lost by an innings and 1 run	
13	3–6 July	Northamptonshire	Town Ground, Kettering	Drawn	
14	7–9 June	Lancashire	County Ground, Taunton	Lost by 9 wickets	
15	10–13 July	Warwickshire	Courtaulds Ground, Coventry	Drawn	
16	17–20 July	Leicestershire	Agricultural Showgrounds, Frome	Won by 166 runs	
17	21–23 July	Kent	Mote Park, Maidstone	Lost by 10 wickets	
18	24–27 July	Worcestershire	County Ground, Taunton	Lost by 174 runs	
19	28–30 July	Hampshire	Dean Park, Bournemouth	Won by 212 runs	
20	31 July–3 August	Gloucestershire	Ashley Down Ground, Bristol	Drawn	
21	4–6 August	Sussex	Clarence Park, Weston-super-Mare	Lost by 6 wickets	
22	7–10 August	Glamorgan	Clarence Park, Weston-super-Mare	Lost by 8 runs	
23	11–13 August	Surrey	Clarence Park, Weston-super-Mare	Lost by 8 wickets	
24	14–17 August	Essex	County Ground, Chelmsford	Won by 6 wickets	
25	18–20 August	Sussex	The Saffrons, Eastbourne	Drawn	
26	21–24 August	Yorkshire	County Ground, Taunton	Drawn	

=== Batting averages ===
Player	Matches	Innings	Runs	Average	Highest score	100s	50s
Harold Gimblett	20	37	1,741	48.36	310	4	10
Bertie Buse	25	45	1,208	28.09	98*	0	8
Miles Coope	26	48	1,107	23.55	89	0	8
George Woodhouse	13	24	484	23.04	75	0	3
Maurice Tremlett	26	46	924	22.00	96*	0	3
Arthur Wellard	18	31	480	18.46	60	0	1
Eric Hill	21	40	670	16.75	85	0	3
Johnny Lawrence	23	39	604	16.32	73	0	4
Qualification: 400 runs. Source: CricketArchive

=== Bowling averages ===
Player	Matches	Balls	Wickets	Average	BBI	5wi	10wm
Horace Hazell	26	5,179	92	19.45	7/35	7	0
Johnny Lawrence	23	3,327	76	21.57	6/29	6	1
Maurice Tremlett	26	4,236	80	24.82	8/31	4	0
Arthur Wellard	18	3,643	50	30.08	6/80	1	0
Bertie Buse	25	2,851	34	37.32	3/21	0	0
Qualification: 30 wickets. Source: CricketArchive

== Other first-class ==
=== Match log ===
No.	Date	Opponents	Venue	Result	Ref
1	5–7 May	Glamorgan	Rodney Parade, Newport	Lost by 98 runs	
2	23–25 June	Oxford University	Recreation Ground, Bath	Lost by 125 runs	
3	28–30 August	Australians	County Ground, Taunton	Lost by an innings and 374 runs	

== Bibliography ==
- Foot, David (1986). Sunshine, Sixes and Cider: The History of Somerset Cricket. Newton Abbot, Devon: David & Charles. ISBN 0-7153-8890-8.
- Roebuck, Peter (1991). From Sammy to Jimmy: The Official History of Somerset County Cricket Club. London: Partridge Press. ISBN 1-85225-085-2.
