= List of Somerset cricket captains =

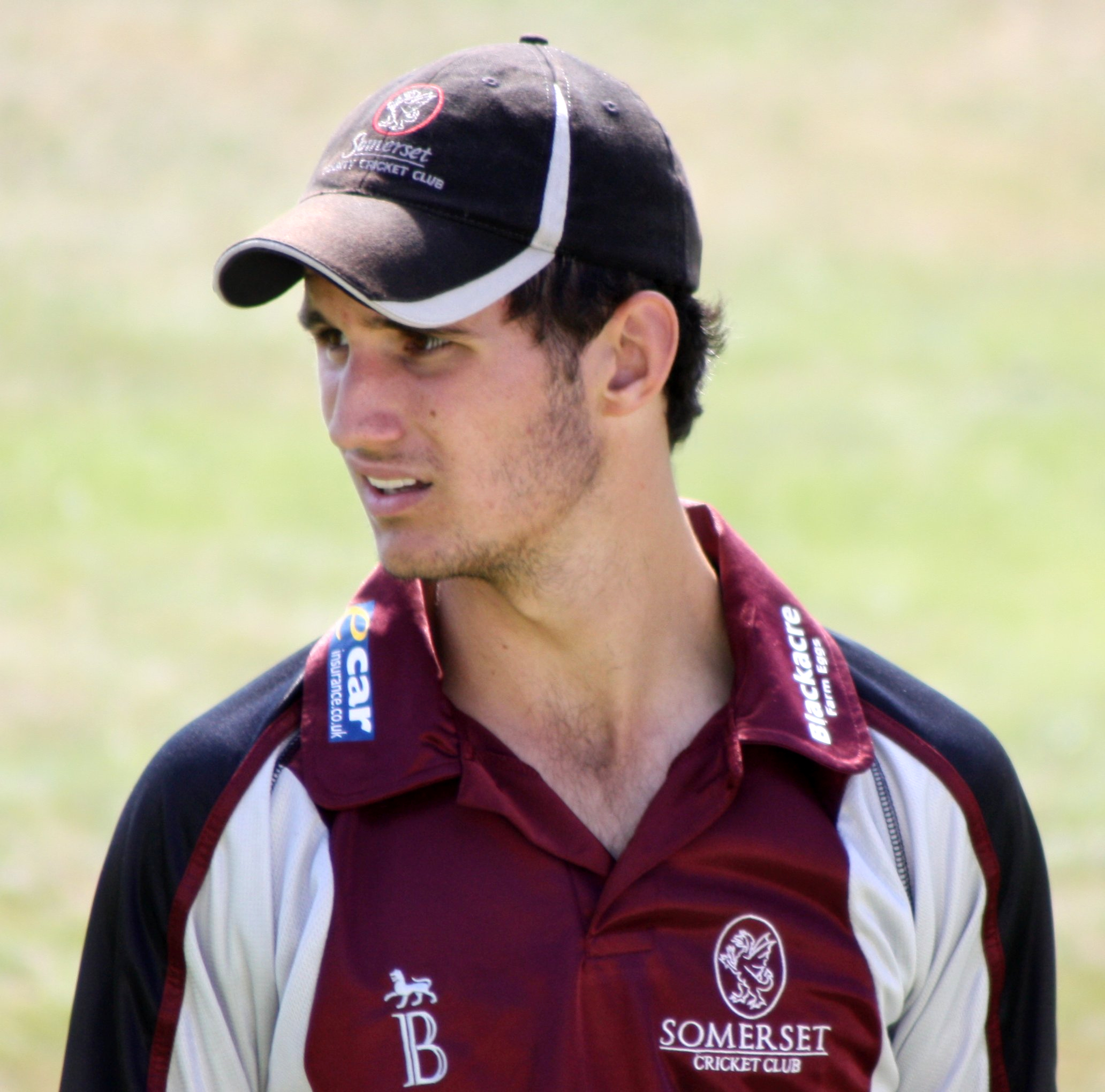
Lewis Gregory is the current captain of Somerset County Cricket Club.

Somerset County Cricket Club are an English cricket club based in Taunton, Somerset. The club was founded in 1875 after a match between "Gentlemen of Somerset" and "Gentlemen of Devon" in Sidmouth, Devon. Somerset played their first undisputed first-class cricket match in 1882 against Lancashire. After missing the first season of the official County Championship, Somerset were admitted for the second in 1891, and have participated in the competition ever since. The club have played both List A cricket and Twenty20 cricket since their introductions into the English game in 1963 and 2003 respectively.

Considered in terms of trophies won, Brian Rose was Somerset's most successful captain, with the county winning five one-day trophies in as many seasons under his captaincy. The county's longest serving captain was Sammy Woods, who was club captain for thirteen seasons from 1894 to 1906. Woods also captained the side on the most occasions, leading his team in 230 first-class fixtures. John Daniell, Brian Close, Marcus Trescothick and Rose are the only other captains to have led Somerset over 200 times, and Rose's total of 112 List A matches as captain is the most by a Somerset player. Lewis Gregory has captained Somerset in Twenty20 cricket on the most occasions, doing so 93 times.

== Captaincy history ==
Since attaining first-class status, Somerset have named 37 official captains. Stephen Newton was the club's first official captain, holding the position during the county's first three seasons of first-class cricket, from 1882 to 1884. Due to his commitments as a schoolmaster in London, he did not play in the opening three matches of 1882, so other players were required to deputise for him in these fixtures. Edward Sainsbury, who took over from Newton for the 1885 season, captained the side in the joint fewest matches along with Mandy Mitchell-Innes: both players captained Somerset in six first-class matches. During the 1885 season, Somerset failed to arrange sufficient fixtures with the other first-class teams to be retain its first-class status, and matches played between 1886 and 1890 were considered 'second-class'. During this time, the captaincy was transferred to Herbie Hewett who, after captaining his side unbeaten against county opposition in 1890, retained the captaincy upon Somerset's return to first-class cricket the following summer. Hewett continued as captain for three further seasons, but retired from the captaincy and the club at the end of the 1893 season following an incident in which he felt his authority had been undermined by the club. His successor as captain was Sammy Woods, who remained in the position for twelve years, the longest by any Somerset captain. Woods, born on the outskirts of Sydney in Australia had played three Test matches for Australia in the late 1880s, and was Somerset's first captain of overseas origin, although he lived the rest of his life in Somerset and also played three Tests for England. He led Somerset in 230 first-class matches, and holds the record for both the most first-class and the most overall matches captained by any Somerset player.

Between 1894 and 1946, the club captaincy remained reasonably stable, six official captains spanned the 52-year period. In addition to Woods, John Daniell, Jack White and Reggie Ingle all captained the side on more than 150 occasions, and Lionel Palairet led the team for one season and Massey Poyntz for two. Bunty Longrigg was captain of the side either side of the Second World War, totalling 73 matches. In contrast, the following nine years saw the club utilise eight different official captains, and a number more unofficial ones. Jack Meyer, who went on to found Millfield, stood down at the end of 1947, his first season as captain. In 1948, the club committee claimed that it was unable to find anyone of suitable pedigree to lead the side for the whole summer, and was forced to name three captains for the season. Mandy Mitchell-Innes led the side throughout the pre-season and for the first five matches of the County Championship during leave from the Sudan Political Service. The captaincy then passed onto Jake Seamer, also on leave from the Sudan Political Service, for seven matches, before the committee settled on George Woodhouse, who remained in the position for the following 1949 season. The next three captains – Stuart Rogers, Ben Brocklehurst and Gerry Tordoff – all captained the side for three seasons or less, and in the words of cricket writer and Somerset County Cricket Club historian David Foot, "captaincy had, ever since the war... been a matter of recurrent concern." This concern, and the fact that there was a lack of amateurs with the necessary time and money to dedicate to the role, meant that in 1956 the club appointed Maurice Tremlett to the role, the county's first professional captain.

The Australian, Colin McCool had been favoured by many, but claimed that he "wouldn't have taken it had there been a life pension to go with it." He observed that the rapid turnover of captains in the previous few years meant that the club had "no feeling of being a cricket team.. players just didn't know what was going on." The decision to pick a professional captain had not been the committee's first choice, and they had chosen Tremlett only after considering a number of amateur options. Even once he had the position, his four years as captain did not run smoothly; club officials felt he was too lax, and there were numerous attempts to remove him from the captaincy. During his tenure, Somerset rose rapidly in the County Championship standings. In 1955, the season before he took over, they had finished in 17th place, bottom of the table. In 1958, his penultimate year as captain, they finished in third, their joint highest position since formation. Despite this success, the Somerset committee was critical of Tremlett's captaincy. Tremlett, in face of constant criticism, lost interest in the captaincy and after a poor 1959 season, was removed from the position.

== Key ==
- Years denotes the years in which the player was named as official club captain for Somerset.
- First denotes the date of the first match in which the player captained Somerset.
- Last denotes the date of the last match in which the player captained Somerset.
- FC denotes the number of first-class matches in which the player captained Somerset.
- LA denotes the number of List A matches in which the player captained Somerset.
- T20 denotes the number of Twenty20 matches in which the player captained Somerset.
- Total denotes the total number of first-class, List A and Twenty20 matches in which the player captained Somerset.

== Official captains ==
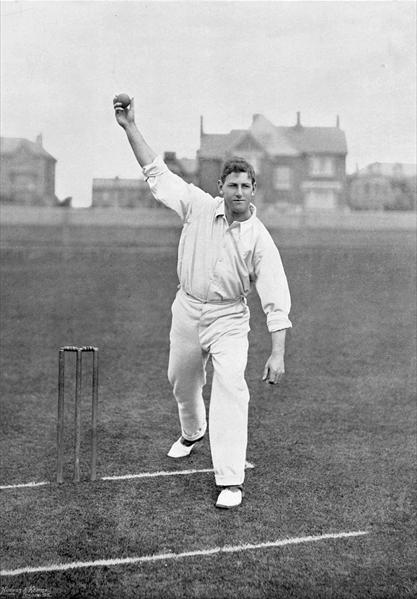
Sammy Woods was Somerset's first official captain born outside England

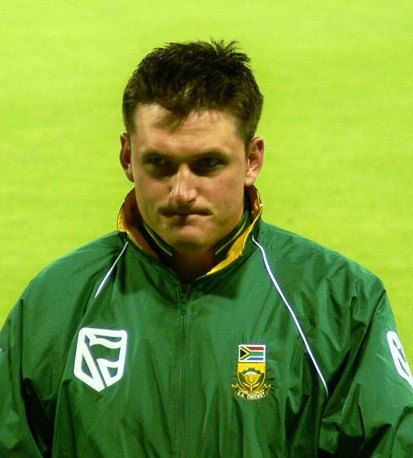
South Africa's Graeme Smith captained Somerset to victory in the 2005 Twenty20 Cup.

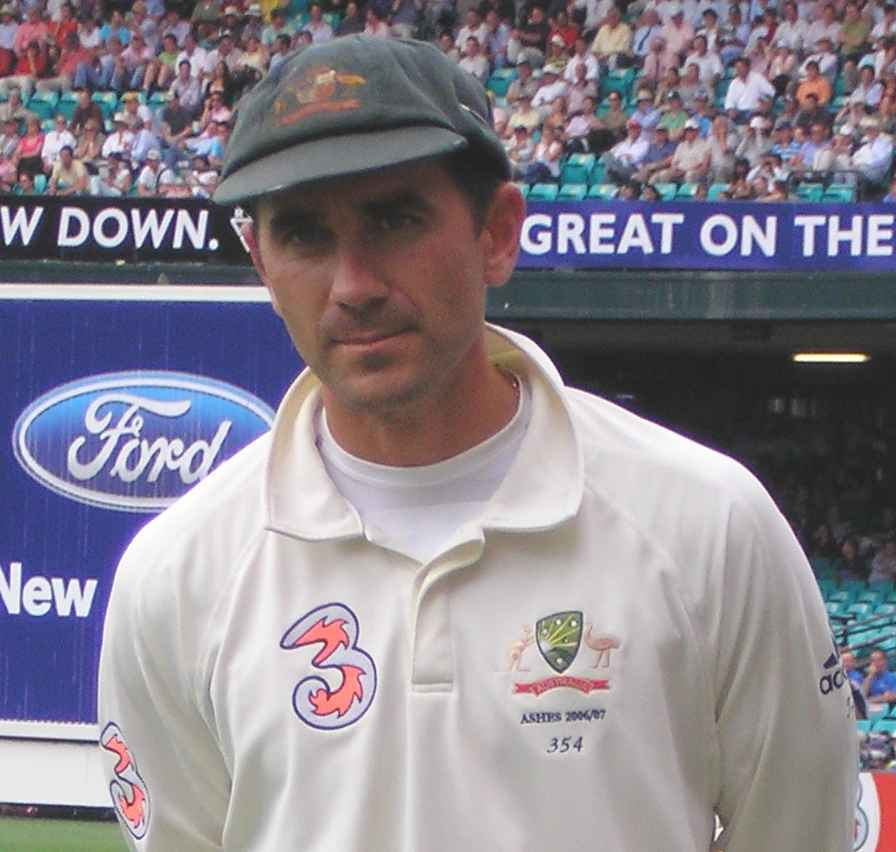
Justin Langer captained Somerset between 2007 and 2009, gaining promotion from Division Two of the County Championship in 2007.

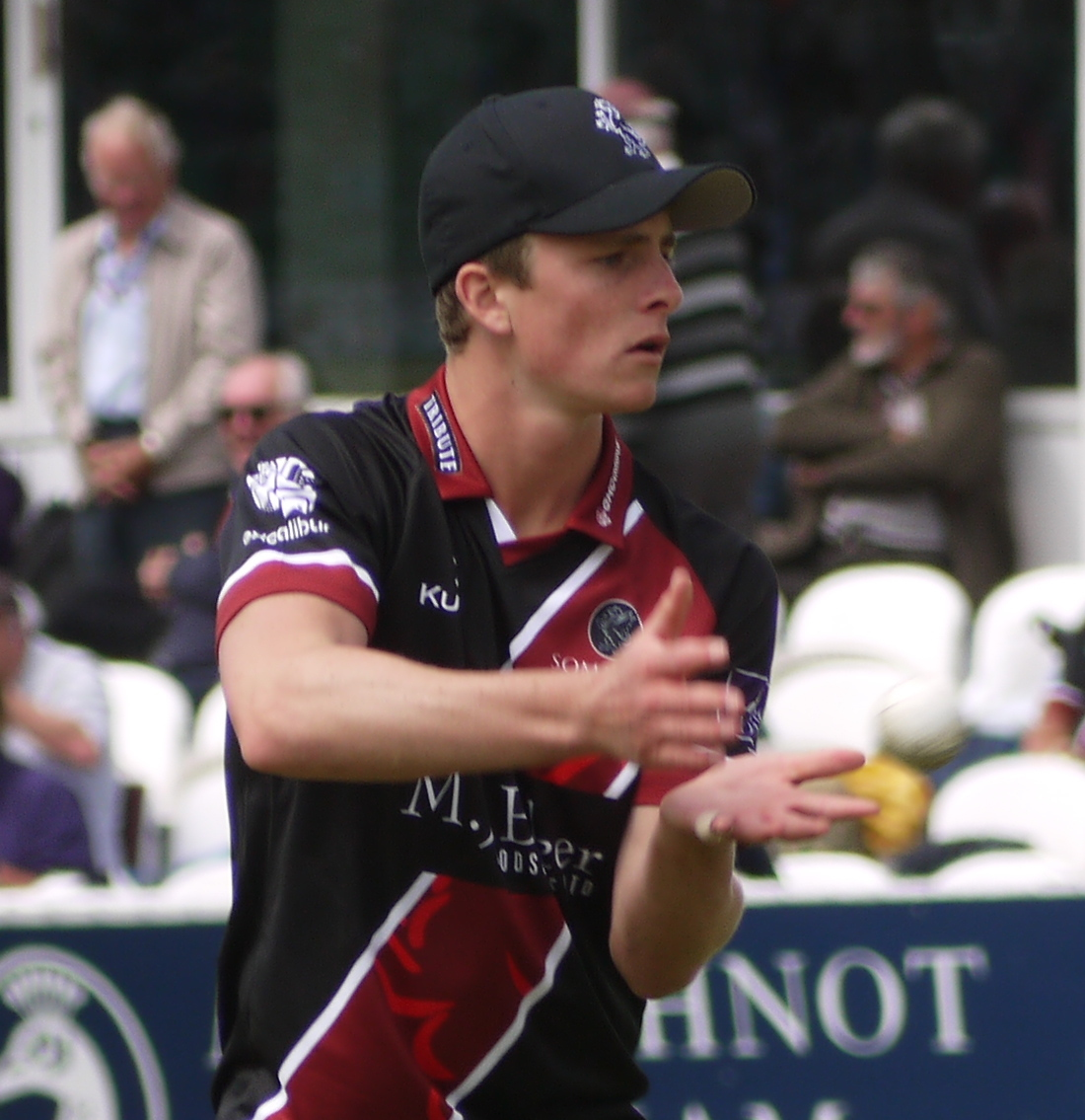
Tom Abell captained Somerset between 2017 and 2023, including winning the 2019 One-Day Cup.

No.	Name	Nationality	Years	First	Last	FC	LA	T20	Total	Refs
1	Stephen Newton	England	1882–1884	4 August 1882	28 August 1884	16	–	–	16	
2	Edward Sainsbury	England	1885	16 July 1885	27 August 1885	6	–	–	6	
3	Herbie Hewett	England	1891–1893	18 May 1891	28 August 1893	44	–	–	44	
4	Sammy Woods	Australia/ England	1894–1906	6 July 1893	10 August 1908	230	–	–	230	
5	Lionel Palairet	England	1907	18 August 1898	29 August 1907	20	–	–	20	
6	John Daniell	England	1908–1912; 1919–1926	11 May 1908	28 August 1926	212	–	–	212	
7	Massey Poyntz	England	1913–1914	23 May 1910	31 August 1914	44	–	–	44	
8	Jack White	England	1927–1931	16 May 1919	13 July 1935	158	–	–	158	
9	Reggie Ingle	England	1932–1937	17 July 1929	19 August 1939	154	–	–	154	
10	Bunty Longrigg	England	1938–1946	23 June 1937	31 May 1947	73	–	–	73	
11	Jack Meyer	England	1947	30 August 1939	30 August 1947	26	–	–	26	
12	Mandy Mitchell-Innes	England	1948	1 August 1936	22 May 1948	6	–	–	6	
13	Jake Seamer	England	1948	29 May 1948	10 July 1948	7	–	–	7	
14	George Woodhouse	England	1948–1949	19 July 1947	27 August 1949	34	–	–	34	
15	Stuart Rogers	England	1950–1952	3 May 1950	27 May 1953	89	–	–	89	
16	Ben Brocklehurst	England	1953–1954	2 May 1953	28 August 1954	56	–	–	56	
17	Gerry Tordoff	England	1955	7 May 1955	31 August 1955	28	–	–	28	
18	Maurice Tremlett	England	1956–1959	11 May 1949	2 September 1959	118	–	–	118	
19	Harold Stephenson	England	1960–1964	17 July 1957	23 May 1964	134	1	–	135	
20	Colin Atkinson	England	1965–1967	21 June 1961	6 September 1967	88	12	–	100	
21	Roy Kerslake	England	1968	11 May 1968	31 August 1968	24	–	–	24	
22	Brian Langford	England	1969–1971	19 June 1965	26 August 1972	80	48	–	128	
23	Brian Close	England	1972–1977	18 August 1971	7 September 1977	118	110	–	228	
24	Brian Rose	England	1978–1983	19 April 1978	10 July 1983	111	112	–	223	
25	Ian Botham	England	1984–1985	17 May 1980	24 August 1985	32	49	–	81	
26	Peter Roebuck	England	1986–1988	8 June 1983	21 August 1988	60	53	–	113	
27	Vic Marks	England	1989	9 July 1980	8 September 1989	73	51	–	124	
28	Chris Tavaré	England	1990–1993	17 May 1989	31 August 1993	84	87	–	171	
29	Andy Hayhurst	England	1994–1996	5 September 1993	30 July 1996	42	50	–	92	
30	Peter Bowler	England	1997–1998	25 May 1995	27 July 2004	49	54	–	103	
31	Jamie Cox	Australia	1999–2002	15 April 1999	12 May 2004	62	78	–	140	
32	Mike Burns	England	2003–2004	17 June 2001	16 September 2004	39	45	9	93	
33	Graeme Smith	South Africa	2005	5 June 2005	30 July 2005	2	5	11	18	
34	Ian Blackwell	England	2005–2006	26 July 2005	24 May 2006	8	10	2	20	
35	Justin Langer	Australia	2007–2009	18 April 2007	18 October 2009	46	43	32	121	
36	Marcus Trescothick	England	2010–2015	23 May 1999	22 September 2015	97	70	49	216	
37	Chris Rogers	Australia	2016	10 April 2016	20 September 2016	16	–	–	16	
38	Tom Abell	England	2017–2023	14 April 2017	26 September 2023	85	13	31	129	
39	Lewis Gregory	England	2024–present	3 July 2017	24 September 2026	36	4	93	133	

== Unofficial captains ==
This is a list of players who have captained Somerset without having been appointed official club captain.

Name	Nationality	First	Last	FC	LA	T20	Total	Refs
Fred Welman	England	8 June 1882	30 July 1883	3	–	–	3	
Arthur Newton	England	5 August 1897	16 May 1910	3	–	–	3	
P. R. Johnson	England	19 July 1909	4 July 1925	13	–	–	13	
Talbot Lewis	England	1 August 1910	1 August 1910	1	–	–	1	
Dar Lyon	England	1 September 1923	17 August 1938	6	–	–	6	
Jack MacBryan	England	1 September 1926	10 August 1929	2	–	–	2	
Guy Earle	England	19 May 1928	15 June 1929	4	–	–	4	
Bill Greswell	England	18 July 1928	18 July 1928	1	–	–	1	
Box Case	England	27 May 1933	4 July 1934	6	–	–	6	
John Barnwell	England	8 July 1936	15 June 1946	4	–	–	4	
Michael Bennett	England	22 May 1937	29 July 1939	7	–	–	7	
Fred Castle	England	21 August 1946	26 June 1948	2	–	–	2	
Hugh Watts	England	19 June 1948	19 June 1948	1	–	–	1	
Johnny Lawrence	England	3 May 1952	13 July 1955	2	–	–	2	
Micky Walford	England	29 August 1953	29 August 1953	1	–	–	1	
Geoff Lomax	England	8 July 1959	2 August 1961	2	–	–	2	
Colin McCool	Australia	15 June 1960	15 June 1960	1	–	–	1	
Bill Alley	Australia	29 July 1961	2 September 1964	27	2	–	29	
Peter Wight	West Indies	19 June 1963	19 June 1963	1	–	–	1	
Roy Virgin	England	25 May 1968	21 June 1972	4	2	–	6	
Peter Robinson	England	31 August 1969	31 August 1969	–	1	–	1	
Graham Burgess	England	28 May 1975	28 May 1975	1	–	–	1	
Derek Taylor	England	15 May 1976	14 August 1977	11	18	–	29	
Peter Denning	England	4 June 1978	5 September 1979	2	1	–	3	
Mervyn Kitchen	England	23 June 1979	23 June 1979	1	–	–	1	
Viv Richards	West Indies	4 July 1981	20 July 1986	9	6	–	15	
Jimmy Cook	South Africa	10 August 1991	10 August 1991	1	–	–	1	
Richard Harden	England	13 May 1992	1 June 1995	9	7	–	16	
Neil Mallender	England	17 July 1994	17 July 1994	–	1	–	1	
Graham Rose	England	31 July 1994	31 July 1994	–	1	–	1	
Simon Ecclestone	England	1 August 1997	14 June 1998	4	4	–	8	
Mushtaq Ahmed	Pakistan	21 June 1998	24 June 1998	–	2	–	2	
Keith Parsons	England	24 July 2002	24 July 2002	1	–	–	1	
Keith Dutch	England	24 June 2003	24 June 2003	–	–	1	1	
Robert Turner	England	9 April 2005	1 June 2005	4	5	–	9	
Matthew Wood	England	18 April 2006	14 May 2006	4	3	–	7	
Cameron White	Australia	29 May 2006	13 August 2006	7	9	8	24	
Andy Caddick	England	15 August 2006	19 August 2008	8	4	–	12	
Peter Trego	England	2 September 2010	25 May 2018	2	3	–	5	
Alfonso Thomas	South Africa	12 January 2011	17 July 2015	7	4	40	51	
James Hildreth	England	31 March 2012	11 July 2021	6	4	3	13	
Jim Allenby	Australia	23 July 2015	18 August 2017	–	26	26	52	
Max Waller	England	29 July 2016	9 July 2021	–	–	2	2	
Craig Overton	England	2 July 2021	19 June 2026	9	–	4	13	
Ben Green	England	25 July 2021	14 August 2022	–	10	1	11	
Josh Davey	Scotland	5 August 2021	10 August 2021	–	3	–	3	
Peter Siddle	Australia	11 July 2022	11 July 2022	1	–	–	1	
Matt Renshaw	Australia	17 August 2022	19 August 2022	–	2	–	2	
Jack Brooks	England	23 August 2022	23 August 2022	–	1	–	1	
Sean Dickson	South Africa	4 August 2023	22 September 2024	–	18	–	18	
James Rew	England	18 April 2025	31 August 2025	1	10	–	11	
Tom Kohler-Cadmore	England	6 July 2025	8 July 2026	–	–	5	5	
Jake Ball	England	21 July 2026	21 July 2026	–	1	–	1	
Lewis Goldsworthy	England	24 July 2026	11 August 2026	–	7	–	7	

== Bibliography ==
- Foot, David. Sunshine, Sixes and Cider: The History of Somerset Cricket (1986 ed.). David & Charles. ISBN 0-7153-8890-8.
