= Dickie Burrough =

English cricketer

Personal information
- Full name: Herbert Dickinson Burrough
- Born: 6 February 1909; Wedmore, Somerset, England
- Died: 9 April 1994 (aged 85); Padstow, Cornwall, England
- Nickname: Dickie
- Batting: Right-handed
- Role: Batsman
- Relatives: William Burrough (father)

Domestic team information
- Years: Team
- 1927–1947: Somerset
- FC debut: 27 August 1927 Somerset v Glamorgan
- Last FC: 3 June 1947 Somerset v Glamorgan

Career statistics
Competition	First-class
Matches	171
Runs scored	5,316
Batting average	20.92
100s/50s	4/23
Top score	135
Catches/stumpings	83/–
- Source: CricketArchive, 25 April 2010

Herbert Dickinson "Dickie" Burrough (6 February 1909 – 9 April 1994), played 171 first-class cricket matches for Somerset in a career that last for 20 years from 1927.

An amateur right-handed batsman who sometimes opened the innings, Burrough was born at Wedmore in Somerset and played fairly regular first-class cricket for Somerset in the early 1930s, making useful runs and fielding athletically. He was, said his obituary in Wisden, "notably enthusiastic". He had been at Cambridge University, but appeared there in only one trial match for "seniors", and never made the first-class cricket side. He was also passed over at Cambridge for hockey, failing to win his university Blue for the sport, though he later played three times for the England team.

In 1931, he played cricket regularly for Somerset, though his highest score was only 55 and he averaged just 16 runs per innings. The following year, 1932, he hit centuries against Northamptonshire and Warwickshire, the former – 135 in 180 minutes at Kettering – remaining the highest score of his career, and his average rose to 27. This record was "as good as that of any other member of the team," said Wisden.

In 1933, though there were no further centuries, Burrough reached 1000 runs in a season for the only time in his career, finishing with 1007. This was his last season for full-time cricket, although he continued to play fairly regularly until 1939, with two further centuries in 1935 and 1937. After the Second World War, he played just three first-class matches, without success.

Like his county captains Reggie Ingle and Bunty Longrigg, Burrough was a solicitor in Bath. He also played for Bath Cricket Club. He died at Padstow in Cornwall in 1994.
