= Jake Seamer =

English amateur cricketer (1913–2006)

Personal information
- Full name: John Wemyss Seamer
- Born: 23 June 1913; Shapwick, Somerset, England
- Died: 16 April 2006 (aged 92); Marlborough, Wiltshire, England
- Batting: Right-handed
- Bowling: Leg break, googly
- Role: Batsman

Domestic team information
- Years: Team
- 1932–1948: Somerset
- 1933–1936: Oxford University
- FC debut: 24 August 1932 Somerset v Derbyshire
- Last FC: 28 May 1949 Free Foresters v Oxford University

Career statistics
Competition	First-class
Matches	81
Runs scored	2,483
Batting average	20.35
100s/50s	4/5
Top score	194
Balls bowled	243
Wickets	4
Bowling average	42.75
5 wickets in innings	0
10 wickets in match	0
Best bowling	2/6
Catches/stumpings	4/–
- Source: CricketArchive, 23 September 2009

John Wemyss "Jake" Seamer (23 June 1913 – 16 April 2006) was an amateur cricketer who played for Oxford University and Somerset either side of the Second World War. A bespectacled cricketer, Seamer was a right-handed batsman who played with a defensive streak to his game which was rarely seen among amateur batsmen of his time. He was described as a leg break googly bowler, but in truth he rarely bowled at all, and claimed just four first-class wickets.

Seamer played the best of his cricket while at Oxford University. All four of his first-class centuries were made for the university side, and his average for Oxford was 35.30, significantly higher than his career average of 20.35. He made his highest score against Free Foresters in his second year, during which he accrued 858 runs, more than double he managed in any other season. On completion of his studies at Oxford, Seamer joined the Sudan Political Service, which limited his first-class cricket appearances to periods of leave. He was named as one of three amateurs to captain Somerset in 1948, leading the team during June and July. That season was his last for Somerset, and he made only one further first-class appearance. He became a district commissioner in the Sudan, and after leaving the service, he taught at Marlborough College and was twice mayor of Marlborough.

== Early life ==
Jake Seamer was born in Shapwick, Somerset on 23 June 1913. The son of a vicar, Seamer had two secret career wishes in his youth; he wanted to be either an actor or, failing that, a county cricketer. He attended Marlborough College in Wiltshire, and played for the school's cricket team from 1930 to 1932. In the winter terms, Marlborough also ran rugby union and hockey teams – rugby in the term before Christmas and hockey in the term between Christmas and Easter. Seamer was a member of the rugby team in 1930 and 1931 first as a wing forward, then as a prop forward. He also played hockey for the Marlborough first team. As a cricketer, his performances for his school led to his selection for "Lord's Schools" in a match against "The Rest" at Lord's Cricket Ground, in which he scored 33 runs in the first innings and 3 runs in the second, remaining not out on both occasions. Following that match he also appeared for a representative Public Schools side against the Army at Lord's, but his batting was less successful, failing to reach double figures in either innings.

During the summer between graduating from Marlborough College and going up to Oxford University, Seamer made his county cricket debut, playing three matches for Somerset County Cricket Club. In his first match for Somerset, played against Derbyshire, he played as a specialist batsman at number eight in the batting order. He came in to bat when Somerset had lost six wickets for the addition of 88 runs, and together with his captain, Reggie Ingle, helped Somerset to recover. The pair put on a partnership of 104 runs, and Seamer scored 70 runs in his debut innings. In both his other matches for the county that season, Seamer batted as part of the top order, and though he reached double figures in each of his innings, he did not achieve another half-century.

== University years ==
=== University cricket ===
Following his graduation from Marlborough College, Seamer attended Brasenose College, Oxford. Seamer played just one first-class match for the university in his first year, appearing against Worcestershire at The Parks. He scored 33 before being run out in his only innings, and also bowled six overs, though without claiming a wicket. He appeared eleven times for Somerset that year, but despite regular scores of 20 or more, he did not score a half-century, and averaged 13.06 runs.

In his second year at Oxford, Seamer played as part of a strong batting line-up for the university: Fredrick de Saram passed 1,000 runs for the side, while Mandy Mitchell-Innes fell just two runs short of the landmark. Seamer, despite scoring over three hundred runs less than either, finished second in the batting averages for the year with 51.76. He scored three centuries for the university, passing one hundred runs against the Free Foresters, the Minor Counties and the Marylebone Cricket Club (MCC). His score of 194, made against the Free Foresters was the highest first-class total of Seamer's career, and the three centuries he scored during 1934 were remarkable for the fact that he only scored one other first-class century during his career. Seamer earned his cricketing Blue in 1934, appearing in the University match against Cambridge University. He was dismissed for a duck in the first innings, but batted with resolve in the second. He remained at the crease with the tail for over two hours, eventually being not out on 24, to help Oxford force a draw. Seamer found batting more difficult in the County Championship: in thirteen innings for Somerset in 1934, he passed 50 once, against Kent, and averaged 16.81, significantly lower than his total for Oxford.

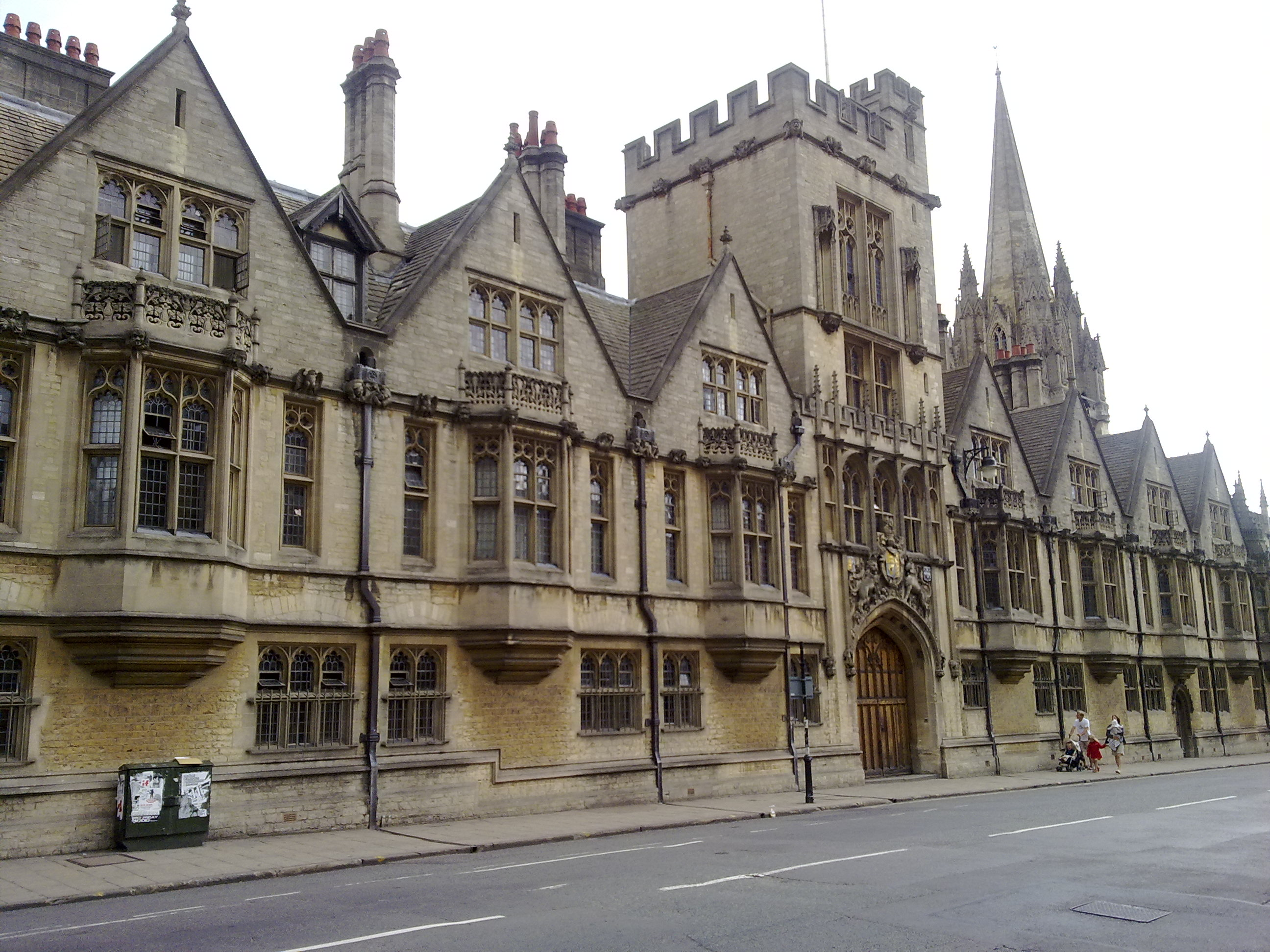
Brasenose College, Oxford, which Seamer attended in the early 1930s.

Seamer scored the last of his four first-class centuries in 1935, his third year at Oxford and his fourth of ten seasons of first-class cricket. The hundred, like all his previous ones, was scored for the university; he reached 113 runs in the second innings of a defeat to Surrey. Seamer struggled for runs in his other matches for the university that year, and in the contest against Cambridge, he scored four and three in a game which Cambridge won easily. In nine innings for Somerset that season, he never scored more than 17 runs and averaged 7.11.

Seamer graduated in 1935, but returned to Oxford for a further year to study Arabic. In his final year of cricket at Oxford, he only appeared in three matches: he was not required to bat in either innings against the Free Foresters, and only batted once against Leicestershire, scoring 5 runs. Out of form and not required for the university team, he went off to play for Somerset in the match against Cambridge University and scored 68. He followed that with a further game for Somerset in which he was not successful and travelled with the Somerset side for the next match against Glamorgan at Llanelli, but Mitchell-Innes, as Oxford captain, called him up as cover for the injured Roger Kimpton; on the morning of the match, The Times reported that Kimpton was likely to play and Seamer would be stood down. In the event, Kimpton failed his fitness test and Seamer's final match for the university team was the university match against Cambridge, and as in the previous year, Oxford suffered a heavy defeat. Seamer scored 11 runs in the first innings, and then when Oxford were asked to follow on, he batted tenaciously to reach 43 runs, which forced Cambridge to bat again. Requiring 17 runs to win, Cambridge chased the total down in 5.4 overs with eight wickets to spare. In total, Seamer played 21 matches for Oxford, scoring 1,059 runs at an average of 35.30.

=== Hockey at Oxford ===
While Seamer won three Blues for cricket, he was even more successful as a field hockey player, appearing in the university hockey match four times. In his first year at the university, he was a late call-up to the team for the big match when the regular right wing-half, M. Martin Harvey, was ill. For the 1933–34 season, when he was secretary of the hockey club, he moved to right-back and won a second Blue. For the 1934/35 season, Seamer was captain of hockey at Oxford. The university match in February 1935, in which Seamer again played at right-back, was a goal-less draw in which defences proved too strong for the forwards on either side. Seamer's reappearance in Oxford for his Arabic course after graduation meant that he was available for the university hockey team in the 1935/36 season as well: the 1936 university match, due to be played at Beckenham on 15 February, had to be postponed because of dense fog on the day. The match was played a week later on a pitch that was, according to the report in The Times, pretty much waterlogged, and Seamer and his fellow back Leeming were credited with enabling Oxford to emerge with a 1–1 draw: Seamer set up the attack that led to the Oxford goal and overall "Oxford owed much to their backs, J. W. Seamer and J. A. Leeming, whose defence, although becoming a trifle wild in the second half, was the saving of the side".

== County cricket ==
On the completion of his extra year learning Arabic at Oxford, Seamer joined the Sudan Political Service. He continued to play cricket for Somerset during his periods of leave, but it dramatically reduced his availability for the county. During his time at Oxford, Seamer had become good friends with Mitchell-Innes; the pair both attended the same college, and played together for both the university and Somerset. When Mitchell-Innes graduated from Oxford the year after Seamer, he joined his friend in the Sudan, where the pair often organised cricket matches, despite the extreme heat. Seamer's duties prevented him from playing for Somerset at all during 1937, but he appeared eight times the following year through May and early June. His average that season was the highest he achieved after leaving university, recording 20.78 from his 14 innings, though his highest score was 47 runs, scored against Derbyshire. In 1939, the last season of first-class county cricket in England before the Second World War, Seamer played seven times for Somerset. However, unlike his appearances the previous year, in which he had generally batted as part of the top order, Seamer predominantly appeared in the middle order for the county in 1939, and his highest score was 28.

Somersetshire will be captained by three amateurs in rotation, N. S. Mitchell-Innes in May, J. W. Seamer in June and part of July and G. E. S. Woodhouse for the rest of the season.

— Manchester Guardian, 1948

After the conclusion of the war, county cricket resumed in 1946, during which year Seamer played two matches with little success. He did not appear in first-class cricket in 1947, but was named as one of three captains of Somerset in 1948. Jack Meyer had reluctantly captained the side in 1947, but stepped down at the end of the season: he was having problems with his sight, and required daily painkillers for lumbago. There was no obvious replacement for Meyer; like many counties Somerset would not consider having a professional captain, and finding an amateur with the time and money to lead the side was proving troublesome. So, with no single candidate suitable, the Somerset committee announced that the club would be captained first by Mitchell-Innes during his leave from the Sudan, then Seamer during his own leave. Once both of these had returned to their duties, George Woodhouse would take over. In his history of Somerset County Cricket Club, Peter Roebuck describes the situation as a "remarkable state of affairs", while David Foot suggests that the true number of captains was closer to seven. During his time as captain, Seamer carried an old train board saying "To Tonbridge" in his cricket bag, claiming that it brought good luck to the team. In the eleven matches that Somerset played under his captaincy though, only one resulted in a victory. Seamer claimed that some of his best friends at the club were among the professionals, who he praised for their team spirit, despite the strained leadership changes. His friendship with the professionals was in contrast to the attitudes of both the club's committee, and its captain for the previous season. Meyer had been unpopular with the professionals due to his attitude to the game, and the manner in which he utilised them, while the club's committee felt that the professional players deserved little recognition when successful, claiming that this was what they were paid for. Seamer's batting was no longer strong enough to support his inclusion in the team, and he played low in the middle order. He failed to reach double figures in any of his first seven innings that season, but recorded a half-century against Kent in his final match for Somerset, his first since 1936 in first-class cricket.

Seamer did not appear again for Somerset after his period as captain in 1948. In total for the county, he scored 1,405 runs at an average of 15.61. He made his final first-class appearance the following season, appearing for the Free Foresters against Oxford University. He later made three Minor Counties Championship appearances for Wiltshire in 1956, though without much success.

== Later life ==
Seamer married Letice Dorothy Lee, and had two children, Katherine Judith and Mary. By 1948 Seamer had risen to be the district commissioner for Khartoum North. When he left the Sudan Political Service in 1950, he returned to England and took up a teaching position at his old school, Marlborough College. In addition to teaching Latin, English and history, he became a housemaster, before his retirement in 1973. He served as mayor of Marlborough twice, and as a justice of the peace, and was awarded Freedom of the City in 2001. He died, following an illness on 16 April 2006, aged 92.

== Personality and style ==
A personable man, Seamer was a popular captain of Somerset. He had some quirks to his personality, and Roebuck goes as far as describing him as an eccentric. During his childhood he would often cycle from his home in Shapwick to Taunton, a distance of over 15 miles, to watch Somerset play cricket. When he began playing for the county, prior to starting at Oxford University, a number of his childhood heroes were still in the side. In one match, Seamer had been dismissed, and passed one of these heroes, Jack White coming to the wicket. White asked what kind of bowler Jim Cornford was, as he had not seen him play before. Seamer, unsure, bluffed and stated that he bowled outswingers. Shortly afterwards, White returned to the dressing room, irate, and declared "the fellow bowls bloody inswingers." Bespectacled, Seamer dressed smartly and was proud of his Somerset heritage, often putting on a broad accent when he was in London.

Unlike most amateurs of the time, Seamer prioritised defensive play when batting; he watched the ball and minimised the risks, valuing his own wicket. This careful style was exemplified by his innings in the university match of 1934, when he helped Oxford salvage a draw by batting for two hours with the tail, during which time he scored 24 runs. Despite his circumspect batting technique, Seamer enjoyed his cricket, and in a more relaxed setting he once scored a century before lunch: playing in the Sudan, the match started at seven in the morning to avoid the worst of the heat. Before their opponent's innings, Seamer and his team-mates got them drunk to improve their chances of a win.

== Bibliography ==
- Bolton, Geoffrey (1962). History of the O.U.C.C. Oxford: Holywell Press Ltd.
- Foot, David (1986). Sunshine, Sixes and Cider: The History of Somerset Cricket. Newton Abbot, Devon: David & Charles. ISBN 0-7153-8890-8.
- Roebuck, Peter (1991). From Sammy to Jimmy: The Official History of Somerset County Cricket Club. London: Partridge Press. ISBN 1-85225-085-2.

Sporting positions
Preceded by Jack Meyer	Somerset County Cricket Captain; 1948 (shared with Mandy Mitchell-Innes, George Woodhouse)	Succeeded by George Woodhouse
