= St Lawrence College, Athens =

Private school in Greece

St Lawrence College (SLC) is a private independent school in Athens, Greece. It was founded in 1980 by Jack Meyer (the founder of Millfield in England), to provide a British education for any family desiring it (usually, so the pupil could later attend university in the United Kingdom or abroad). It started with 60 children, and rapidly expanded with a present student body of over 1000 at preschool, junior school and high school level.

The current headmaster is Mr. P.A.Holden.

== Hellinikon campus ==
The old campus of St Lawrence College was located in Hellinikon from where it operated for 22 years. The main building, which has since been demolished, was located on 2, Delta Street. In its early years, in the mid-1980s, there was also a second campus at Gargitos, which housed students from 3rd grade onward, with school facilities that included a hall, a tuck shop, a football pitch and a play area behind the two-storey school buildings. Also in these early years, students up until 2nd grade were housed in an old neoclassical mansion in Psychiko. The Gargitos campus closed in 1987. The Hellinikon Campus was spread out over 4 areas with gardens and a view to the sea. The buildings were located next to the old Hellinikon airport, the former international airport of Athens and the Hellinikon Olympic Complex and Aghios Kosmos Port.

== Vari campus ==
SLC's new campus is located near to Vari in southern Athens. The school relocated here for the start of the 2004 academic year. The new campus features an Olympic sized swimming pool, a full-size artificial football pitch, 2 tennis courts, a 400-seat amphitheater, a large indoor Gym and 2 large areas for parking.

== Headteachers ==
- 1980-1985: Jack Meyer
- 1985-2012: G.N. Kladidis
- 2012–present: Phil Holden

== Notable alumni ==
- Ian Vougioukas
