= Stuart Rogers =

English cricketer

Personal information
- Full name: Stuart Scott Rogers
- Born: 18 March 1923; Muswell Hill, London, England
- Died: 6 November 1969 (aged 46); Chartridge, Buckinghamshire, England
- Batting: Right-handed
- Role: Batsman

Domestic team information
- Years: Team
- 1947–1953: Somerset
- FC debut: 3 January 1947 Europeans v Indians
- Last FC: 15 June 1953 Somerset v Leicestershire

Career statistics
Competition	First-class
Matches	119
Runs scored	3,608
Batting average	18.89
100s/50s	3/18
Top score	107*
Balls bowled	196
Wickets	2
Bowling average	72.50
5 wickets in innings	0
10 wickets in match	0
Best bowling	2/13
Catches/stumpings	46/–
- Source: CricketArchive, 27 June 2008

Stuart Scott Rogers (18 March 1923 – 6 November 1969) played first-class cricket for Somerset and captained the side from 1950 to 1952.

== Early career ==
Rogers was born at Muswell Hill, one of three sons of Reginald Scott Rogers and Marjorie Rogers née Prince. A fair-haired right-handed middle-order batsman who sometimes opened the innings, Stuart Rogers was educated at Highgate School from 1935 to 1941, playing in the cricket XI for four years and also captaining the soccer XI. He went on to Pembroke College, Cambridge before enlisting in 1943, serving in the 6th Gurkhas and the Chindits during the Second World War and eventually becoming a Major. He played in the wartime university matches against Oxford University at both soccer and cricket in 1941–1942.

After one first-class appearance in India in 1946–47, he joined Somerset as an amateur player in 1948, appearing in seven matches but making little impact. The following year, Rogers played 13 times, appearing in two periods of the season. In June, he made his first three 50s, with 54 against the New Zealanders, 51 against Gloucestershire and 61 against Hampshire in successive matches. He was less successful in August, when the efforts of other amateurs helped Somerset to overcome the handicap of losing 15 out of 26 County Championship matches, as many as any other county side, and finish joint ninth out of 17.

At the end of the 1949 season, George Woodhouse, the Somerset captain, retired to the family brewery business. Somerset, who had struggled through 1948 under a series of temporary captains, were not keen to repeat the experience. Rogers was the only available amateur willing to commit to a full season, and was duly appointed captain for 1950.

== Somerset captain ==
Rogers captained Somerset for three seasons of mixed fortunes. The 1950 season saw the side finish equal seventh in the Championship, and eight victories were exceeded by only three teams. "Once more volatile Somerset falsified prophecies of a poor season," wrote Wisden in its review. It went on: "The appointment of an inexperienced player to lead a side forced to make experiments seemed like a leap in the dark, but as the summer advanced deeds spoke louder than words and in the end an adventurous policy was fully justified."

Rogers' own contribution was 1030 Championship runs, 1127 in all matches, including his first century, 101, batting at No 7 against Northamptonshire at Frome. In this innings, he hit three sixes and nine fours, and shared a seventh wicket partnership of 182 with Harold Stephenson; Rogers and Stephenson were responsible for several late-innings fast-scoring partnerships in Somerset matches in 1950.

Rogers' second season as Somerset captain, 1951, was more difficult than the first. The side was dependent for wickets on a trio of spin bowlers, Johnny Lawrence, Ellis Robinson and Horace Hazell, with the last two both past 40. In 1950, runs had come from several team members: in 1951, Maurice Tremlett made more than 2,000 and Harold Gimblett 1,400, but no one else apart from a couple of irregular amateurs averaged more than 20. Rogers made only 784 runs in Championship games with a top score of 58, although his season average and total was improved by an unbeaten 107 in 160 minutes against the South African touring team. This was to prove his highest score in first-class cricket. With both batting and bowling inadequacies, Somerset fell back to 14th in the Championship, with only five victories and 15 defeats.

Worse followed in 1952. Gimblett made 2,000 runs, and the rest of the batting was marginally improved over 1951, but inability to take wickets at reasonable cost consigned the side to the bottom of the Championship table for the first time since 1913. Only two matches were won all season and, Wisden reported, "even these meagre successes were due as much to the spin of the coin as the turn of the ball. When Somerset won the toss in the Bath Festival they triumphed over Middlesex and Warwickshire and when they lost it they went under to Leicestershire." Wisden noted too that morale was low: "General slackness, particularly in fielding, was Somerset's biggest handicap. Until the whole club develops a more enthusiastic spirit as portrayed by Gimblett, they will continue to disappoint their faithful supporters."

Rogers himself had a mediocre season: he made 841 runs in the Championship, with a third and final career century, an unbeaten 102 in Gimblett's benefit match against Northamptonshire at Glastonbury. At the end of the season he stood down from the captaincy, and though he appeared again in nine matches in 1953, he was not successful and left first-class cricket.

== Personal style ==
Rogers was captain in 89 of the 119 first-class matches he appeared in. His instincts appear to have been largely attacking, and he had a limited and ageing side at his disposal. David Foot, the historian of Somerset cricket, wrote: "The crowd quite liked him, though he wasn't wholly one of the boys." Foot records the senior professional, Horace Hazell, being taken out for drinks at restaurants by Rogers and returning "as drunk as a handcart". But Eric Hill, one of the young players of the time and later the doyen of the Taunton press box, "feels that Rogers probably lacked rapport with the younger professionals". Hill records, in Foot's book, Rogers ordering a curfew of 10 o'clock in a match against Hampshire: "The skipper plotted his evening accordingly and staggered up to bed at half-past nine... more drunk than anyone I've ever seen in my life."

As was sometimes the custom of the 1950s, Rogers was nominally the secretary as well as the captain of Somerset, though the secretarial duties appear to have been undertaken by a succession of retired military gentlemen. The arrangement would have allowed Rogers to draw a salary while maintaining his amateur status.

== Later life and death ==
Rogers became a member of the London Stock Exchange and a partner in Keith, Bayley & Rigg, stockbrokers. In 1951 he married Margaret Helen Findlay, who died in 2001. They had a daughter and two sons. He later turned to farming. He died at Chartridge, Buckinghamshire in 1969.

Sporting positions
Preceded by George Woodhouse	Somerset County Cricket Captain; 1950–1952	Succeeded by Ben Brocklehurst
