= Chris Greetham =

English cricketer

Personal information
- Full name: Christopher Herbert Millington Greetham
- Born: 28 August 1936; Wargrave, Berkshire, England
- Died: 13 March 2017 (aged 80)
- Batting: Right-handed
- Bowling: Right-arm medium
- Role: All-rounder

Domestic team information
- Years: Team
- 1957–1966: Somerset
- FC debut: 8 June 1957 Somerset v Gloucestershire
- Last FC: 18 June 1966 Somerset v Cambridge University

Career statistics
Competition	First-class	List A
Matches	205	11
Runs scored	6,723	182
Batting average	21.97	16.54
100s/50s	5/33	0/0
Top score	151*	44
Balls bowled	12,256	253
Wickets	195	3
Bowling average	28.35	51.33
5 wickets in innings	5	0
10 wickets in match	1	0
Best bowling	7/56	1/1
Catches/stumpings	96/–	6/–
- Source: CricketArchive, 21 September 2009

Christopher Herbert Millington Greetham (28 August 1936 – 13 March 2017) played first-class cricket for Somerset County Cricket Club from 1957 to 1966 as a middle-order batsman and a medium-pace bowler. Greetham was a tall, fair-haired right-handed batsman usually used in Somerset's late middle order and a right-arm seam bowler who, for a couple of seasons in the early 1960s, took enough wickets to be classed as an all-rounder. He was considered a good cover fielder, with a strong and accurate throw.

== Career ==
He first played for Somerset in 1957 and became a regular player in 1959, when he hit 881 runs in the season and made his highest first-class score, an unbeaten 151 in the match against the Combined Services. One week after this innings, he made a second century, 104, including three sixes and 12 fours, against somewhat more demanding opposition in the match against Derbyshire. The innings, said Wisden, "revealed he could be relied upon when quick scoring was needed".

The following two seasons, 1960 and 1961, saw Greetham make useful innings and take useful wickets, but he did not advance on his 1959 figures, making around 800 runs in each season and failing to score a century in either. In 1962, however, he made 1,000 runs for the first time in a season, finishing with 1151 at an average of 26.76 runs per innings, and taking 69 first-class wickets at an average of 20.91. There were no centuries in this season, but his seven for 56 against Glamorgan were the best innings bowling figures of his career, and when he took six for 19 and four for 29 against Lancashire late in the season he achieved 10 wickets in a match for the only time in his first-class career. Wisden was complimentary about Greetham's progress in 1962: "Greetham, previously a useful middle order batsman, developed into an extremely competent all-rounder," it wrote. "A naturally aggressive right-hander, he scored over 1,000 runs for the first time and, bowling at a lively pace, took more wickets during the season than in his previous four years with the county." Greetham was awarded his county cap in 1962.

The 1963 season saw Somerset finish third in the County Championship, equalling the highest placing in its history to that point. Greetham was one of six players to pass 1,000 runs for the season, and his final aggregate of 1186 was his best for a single season, with the average of 28.23 runs per innings the highest of his career. Against Leicestershire at Weston-super-Mare, on a wet pitch, he made 141 in three hours; eight Somerset wickets had fallen for 145 when Greetham was joined by Harold Stephenson, the Somerset captain, and the pair put on 183 for the ninth wicket in 105 minutes. The stand remains the ninth wicket record for Somerset: it was equalled, but not surpassed, in 1990 by Chris Tavare and Neil Mallender. With the recruitment of fast bowler Fred Rumsey to Somerset in 1963, there was less bowling for Greetham, but he still took 44 wickets.

Greetham was one of several Somerset batsmen for whom the 1964 season saw a regression. Unlike Peter Wight and Brian Roe, who suffered similar declines, he retained his place for most matches, but his aggregate of runs dropped by more than half to just 504, there was only one score of more than 50, and his average fell too to just 15. His bowling offered no consolation, and his wickets fell to just 17 and the average rose to more than 40 runs per wicket.

There was a small improvement in batting in 1965, when he made 943 runs in all matches at an average of 21.93. The total included centuries in both the home and away matches against Middlesex. Wisden commented in its reports on both matches about the speed of Greetham's scoring and the power of his strokes, and later in the season noted "a remarkable innings" against Cambridge University in which Greetham, arriving at the wicket with 45 minutes of the first day to play, reached 73 not out by close of play (he went on to 93). But Greetham's bowling had disappeared almost entirely by this stage: in 28 County Championship matches in 1965, he bowled only six overs and took no wickets, and his only two wickets of the whole season came in the match against Cambridge University.

The 1966 season was, like 1963, a successful one for Somerset, but this time Greetham played almost no part. Dropped after two matches in which he made only 26 runs, he did not regain his place except for one match against Cambridge University, in which he again took two wickets, but again failed with the bat. This was his last first-class match.

Greetham "would have been made for one-day cricket", says one modern directory of Somerset cricketers. In fact, his record in the 10 Gillette Cup matches he played for Somerset between 1963 and 1966 was modest, with 150 runs in 10 innings and just three wickets. He did, however, retain his place in Somerset's one-day side longer than in the first-class team: his last first-team appearance was in the Gillette semi-final defeat by Warwickshire in August 1966.

This was not, however, his final List A appearance. Having left Somerset at the end of the 1966 season, he appeared in Minor Counties cricket for Devon in 1968 and 1969, and in the latter season he played in the first round Gillette Cup match against Hertfordshire, not bowling but scoring 32 out of a Devon total of 75 as Hertfordshire won the match easily.

== After cricket ==
Greetham played three non-first-class matches for Marylebone Cricket Club (MCC) and Free Foresters in 1970 and 1971 with some success. Outside cricket, he worked as "a diamond sorter, teacher and film extra". He was also secretary of a golf club in Devon.
