= Miles Coope =

English cricketer (1916–1974)

Personal information
- Born: 28 November 1916; Gildersome, Yorkshire, England
- Died: 5 July 1974 (aged 57); Gildersome, Yorkshire, England
- Batting: Right-handed
- Bowling: Right-arm leg-break
- Role: Bbatsman

Domestic team information
- Years: Team
- 1947–1949: Somerset
- FC debut: 24 May 1947 Somerset v Gloucestershire
- Last FC: 2 August 1949 Somerset v Gloucestershire

Career statistics
Competition	First-class
Matches	71
Runs scored	2,789
Batting average	21.12
100s/50s	2/14
Top score	113
Balls bowled	492
Wickets	8
Bowling average	59.87
5 wickets in innings	0
10 wickets in match	0
Best bowling	3/29
Catches/stumpings	20/–
- Source: CricketArchive, 23 November 2008

Miles Coope (28 November 1916 – 5 July 1974) was an English cricketer who played first-class cricket for three seasons after the Second World War for Somerset.

A right-handed middle-order batsman sometimes used as an opener and an occasional leg-break bowler, Coope played for Yorkshire's second eleven in Minor Counties cricket before the war. He was also prominent in Bradford League cricket, and he followed another leading Bradford League cricketer, Johnny Lawrence, to Somerset after the war, arriving for the 1947 season.

Coope made 20 and 58 in his first match, the Whitsun 1947 County Championship game against Gloucestershire. After this, he played regularly for the rest of the season and less than two months after making his debut, he scored 113, his first century and the highest score of his career, as Somerset beat the 1947 season's County Champions, Middlesex for the second time in the season – Middlesex were, however, lacking the prolific Denis Compton, Bill Edrich and Jack Robertson, all of whom were playing in the Gentlemen v Players match. The century brought Coope his county cap.

By the end of his first season in first-class cricket, Coope had scored 791 runs at an average of 20.81.

In the 1948 season, Coope played in every single match played by Somerset and topped 1,000 runs for the county, finishing with 1172 runs for the season at the average of 22.11 runs per innings. He did not make a century, his highest being 89 against Sussex at Eastbourne, when he put on 209 for the fifth wicket with Harold Gimblett, who made the then highest-ever score for Somerset, 310. Wisden Cricketers' Almanack noted that Coope "gave some attractive displays but inclined to inconsistency".

In 1949, Coope began the season well and in the match against Lancashire at Old Trafford in mid May he hit an unbeaten 102, his second century of his career, out of a Somerset total of 190. But his batting fell away and when Somerset's usual band of August amateurs became available, he lost his place and did not regain it. At the end of the season, he was not re-engaged and returned to League cricket in Yorkshire.

In just three seasons of first-class cricket, Coope had made 2789 runs at an average of 21.12. But the reputation for inconsistency, first aired in Wisden, remains. David Foot, the historian of Somerset cricket, wrote of Coope: "As a batsman his range of shots was ambitious and he had one of the most delicate late cuts ever paraded in the West. There were two centuries from him but he was also a luxury, never quite consistent or disciplined enough with his repertoire to make a successful county cricketer."
