= Harold Stephenson =

English first-class cricketer

Personal information
- Full name: Harold William Stephenson
- Born: 18 July 1920; Haverton Hill, County Durham, England
- Died: 23 April 2008 (aged 87); England
- Batting: Right-handed
- Role: Wicketkeeper

Domestic team information
- Years: Team
- 1944–1947: Durham
- 1948–1964: Somerset
- 1965–1968: Dorset
- First-class debut: 5 May 1948 Somerset v Glamorgan
- Last First-class: 23 May 1964 Somerset v Warwickshire

Career statistics
Competition	First-class	List A
Matches	463	2
Runs scored	13195	20
Batting average	20.08	10.00
100s/50s	7/45	0/0
Top score	147*	16
Balls bowled	140	–
Wickets	1	–
Bowling average	135.00	–
5 wickets in innings	0	–
10 wickets in match	0	n/a
Best bowling	1/0	–/–
Catches/stumpings	746/334	1/0
- Source: Cricinfo, 4 October 2009

Harold William Stephenson (18 July 1920 – 23 April 2008) was an English first-class cricketer who played for Somerset. He captained Somerset from 1960 until his retirement in 1964.

Stephenson is easily the most successful wicket-keeper in history for Somerset, and is the county's only cricketer to have taken 1,000 dismissals. He also holds the county record for the most stumpings in a season as well as most catches in a season.

== Early career ==
Stephenson was born (as William Harold Stephenson) in Haverton Hill, Stockton-on-Tees, County Durham and played Minor Counties cricket for Durham in 1947, succeeding Dick Spooner, who had been recruited by Warwickshire, as wicketkeeper. Stephenson in turn was recruited by Somerset in 1948, having been recommended to the county by Micky Walford, the amateur batsman and schoolmaster who also came from Stockton.

== County wicketkeeper ==
Stephenson joined Somerset for the 1948 season, but played in only eight matches. He kept wicket in only two of them, and was used mostly as an opening batsman, not with any great success.

The following season, however, he succeeded the long-serving Wally Luckes as the regular wicketkeeper and, despite missing half a dozen matches, he set a new county record for dismissals, with 39 catches and 44 stumpings for Somerset (plus two more catches in an end-of-season representative match). The number of stumpings remains a Somerset record. Wisden said that he "exceeded expectations" and added: "Some of his stumpings off the slow bowlers were remarkably clever and quick enough to suggest optical tests for umpires." He also made more than 700 runs, batting mostly down the batting order at No 7 or No 8.

That 1949 season set the pattern for Stephenson: he was at or near the top of the wicketkeepers' lists for dismissals for the next decade, setting the Somerset record with 86 dismissals in 1954. Somerset wicketkeepers have made 70 or more dismissals in a season 16 times, and Stephenson accounts for exactly half of those.

In addition, his batting developed. In 1952, he made the first of what would prove to be seven career centuries with 114 against Glamorgan at Swansea, with four sixes and 11 fours. He passed 1,000 runs for the season for the first time in 1952, and then did so in each of the next four seasons. In the mid-1950s, he was batting higher in the order, often at No 3, though this was partly due to the weakness of the Somerset side, which finished bottom of the County Championship for four consecutive seasons from 1952 to 1955.

Playing for a weak team may not have helped Stephenson's representative career, though England were not short of outstanding wicketkeepers in this period. The nearest he got to Test honours was as part of a Commonwealth team that toured India in 1950–51, when he took part in two of the "unofficial Tests" and headed the batting averages for the tour as a whole. In 1955–56 he toured Pakistan with a Marylebone Cricket Club (MCC) "A" side and played in two of the "representative matches" against what was close to being a full Pakistan Test side.

Stephenson was first-choice wicketkeeper for Somerset throughout the 1950s, but he missed much of the county's most successful season for 66 years: the 1958 season, when the side finished third in the County Championship. Injured for much of the year, he played only 11 out of 28 Championship matches. But he returned fully fit for the 1959 season, though his batting was less impressive in that season and he passed 50 only once.

== Somerset captain ==
At end of the 1959 season, Maurice Tremlett, who had been Somerset's captain since 1956, the first professional to hold the job in modern times, stood down from the job. Candidates to succeed Tremlett included Colin McCool and Bill Alley, two Australians associated with Somerset's recent successes, but 44 and 41 years old respectively. Stephenson, at 39, was not much younger, but was chosen.

Combative and chatty, Stephenson stayed in the captain's job for five seasons and was successful: in 1963 he led the side to third place in the County Championship, equalling the best-ever and the team, which had relied across the 1950s primarily on spin for wickets, developed in Ken Palmer and Fred Rumsey two fast bowlers good enough to play fleetingly for England.

Stephenson's own contribution behind the wicket and with the bat remained high. He hit his own highest score, an unbeaten 147 in 200 minutes with one six and 19 fours, against Nottinghamshire at Bath in 1962, within two weeks of his 42nd birthday.

== The end of his career ==
Stephenson played in the first few first-class matches of the 1964 season as Somerset captain and wicketkeeper, but was then injured. In his absence, the side was captained by the veteran Australian Alley, and Peter Eele, who had deputised for Stephenson in the injury-hit 1958 season, returned to keep wicket.

Stephenson appears to have expected to return to both the captaincy and the wicketkeeping role, but he was unable to do so in the 1964 season. At the end of the season Somerset appointed Colin Atkinson, the Millfield schoolmaster (and a fellow Teessider) as captain for the 1965 season and recruited Geoff Clayton, the Lancashire wicketkeeper, as first-choice. Stephenson retired from first-class cricket, apparently with some reluctance.

Stephenson continued to live in Taunton, but from 1965 to 1968 played regular Minor Counties cricket for Dorset. "(He) didn't return too often to the County Ground," says one account.

== Playing style and personality ==
A dapper, chatty cricketer with pads that always appeared a size too big for him, Stephenson was known throughout his county career as "Steve". He was a character in a side that, in Somerset's bad days of the 1950s, was unusually short of personalities.

He made his wicketkeeping reputation standing up to the stumps and taking tricky spin bowling from Johnny Lawrence, Ellis Robinson, and later Colin McCool, but in his 40s he proved he was no slouch standing back to faster bowlers as Somerset's attack turned successfully to seam in the early 1960s. He set the county records for stumpings in a season, in 1949, and for catches in a season, in 1963, as well as for the most dismissals in a season. He also set the county record for the number of career dismissals, was the first to make six dismissals in an innings, and equalled the county record of nine dismissals in a match.

He was highly rated by his colleagues as a wicketkeeper. McCool, in his memoirs Cricket is a Game, wrote: "Steve has as good a pair of wicket-keeping hands as I have seen in the business. If I had to choose between him and Godfrey Evans, I would go for him every time." The fast-medium bowler Ken Biddulph, also from County Durham, called Stephenson a "brilliant keeper: I never saw him have a bad day".

As a batsman, Stephenson was combative and cheeky, always ready for a quick single. He "batted with an exciting, slightly reckless relish that seldom rejected the gamble of a perilously possible single," says the history of Somerset cricket. As late as his final full season in 1963, he set a ninth-wicket partnership record of 183 with Chris Greetham that has been equalled, but not beaten, for Somerset, making 80 when batting at No 10 at Weston-super-Mare against Leicestershire.

Stephenson was very much one of the professionals and even as captain had little time for the stuffier county cricket element. There were run-ins with the county establishment. Cricket writer David Foot in an obituary of Stephenson reported "one corrosive exchange with the county chairman, Bunty Longrigg". Foot reports Stephenson as saying: "It was my fifth year in charge and we'd got to the Bath Festival. The chairman approached me and asked me bluntly who I thought we should leave out to make way for an amateur or two. I bristled and told him that if he had plans to make changes, he had better skipper the county himself."

Foot goes on: "When it came to the annual dinner – and tributes were expected for Steve's outstanding record and longevity with the team – Longrigg said nothing. It was a significant snub."

As a captain, Stephenson was "canny rather than memorably imaginative". "Stephenson couldn't be seriously faulted tactically," says the county's history, also by Foot. "He got the best out of his team. It wasn't always easy."

Sporting positions
Preceded by Maurice Tremlett	Somerset County Cricket Captain; 1960–1964	Succeeded by Colin Atkinson
