= Reggie Ingle =

English cricketer (1903-1992)

Personal information
- Full name: Reginald Addington Ingle
- Born: 5 November 1903; Bodmin, Cornwall, England
- Died: 19 December 1992 (aged 89); Bath, Somerset, England
- Batting: Right-handed
- Role: Batter

Domestic team information
- Years: Team
- 1923–1939: Somerset
- FC debut: 24 August 1923 Somerset v Essex
- Last FC: 22 August 1939 Somerset v Hampshire

Career statistics
Competition	First-class
Matches	325
Runs scored	9,829
Batting average	18.75
100s/50s	10/36
Top score	119*
Balls bowled	27
Wickets	0
Bowling average	–
5 wickets in innings	–
10 wickets in match	–
Best bowling	–
Catches/stumpings	129/–
- Source: CricketArchive, 28 June 2008

Reginald Addington Ingle (5 November 1903 – 19 December 1992) was a cricketer who played first-class cricket for Somerset from 1923 to 1939 and captained the side from 1932 to 1937. Ingle also played cricket for Cambridge University, but failed to win a blue. He was born at Bodmin, Cornwall and died at Bath, Somerset.

A right-handed middle-order batter, Ingle was a regular player for 10 years in the Somerset side from 1927 to 1937, an era in which the team's batting was dominated by amateur cricketers. A member of a legal family from Bath, Ingle himself practised as a solicitor in the city and for much of the 1930s, the Somerset side had three Bath solicitors in its ranks, with Bunty Longrigg, Ingle's successor as captain, appearing alongside Dickie Burrough.

== Early life and cricket career ==
Ingle went to Oundle School, heading the school batting averages in 1921. He made his first-class debut for Somerset in a rain-ruined match against Essex at Taunton in August 1923. He made 54 in his first innings, one of only two Somerset players to make more than seven in a total of 189, and put on 97 for the sixth wicket with Jack MacBryan, who made 101.

Ingle was at Cambridge University for the 1923 to 1926 seasons, but made little impact on cricket there. He did not play at all in 1923, was tried five times in 1924 and then fleetingly again in both 1925 and 1926, but in 15 innings for Cambridge he made only 138 runs, and was not picked for the University matches against Oxford. In each season, though, once the university term was over he returned to play fairly regularly for Somerset.

Ingle's development as a batter was slow and his batting average hovered around the mid teens for the whole of the mid 1920s. In 1926, he made his first century, an unbeaten 119 against Essex at Taunton in which he shared four 50-run partnerships over the course of four hours. But without that century, his batting average for the season, including a couple of games for Cambridge, would have been less than 12. The innings remained the highest of his career, although he hit nine other first-class centuries.

== County regular ==
From 1927, Ingle played regularly for Somerset for 11 seasons, never appearing in less than 21 games a year. He was allowed out of the family firm legal duties by his father, returning to the law for the winters. The first full season was mediocre, but in the first match of the 1928 season, against Middlesex at Taunton, he hit 117 and 100 not out, only the third player, after Peter Randall Johnson and John Daniell, to achieve the feat for Somerset. The rest of the season did not live up to this start, but Ingle still finished the season by passing 1,000 runs for the first time and having an average for his 1,027 runs of 27.75, the first time he had passed 20 for a complete season.

The following three seasons saw no progression. Ingle's batting averages reverted to below 20 in each of them, and he did not approach 1,000 runs for the season. There was just one more century in these years: 108 against Cambridge University at Bath in 1929.

== Somerset captain ==
At the end of the 1931 English cricket season, Jack White, Somerset captain since 1927, gave up the captaincy and Ingle was appointed for the 1932 season. He held the job for six seasons, and could be accounted relatively successful, since the side finished in the top half of the County Championship twice in this period, a feat not achieved in the preceding seven seasons.

For Ingle personally, the first season of captaincy, 1932, was the best. Wisden, in its review of the 1932 Somerset season for the 1933 annual, said he was to be "heartily congratulated" on the improvement in the side which had taken it from thirteenth to seventh place. It went on: "If taking some time really to find his form, he led the side with considerable ability and judgment and set his colleagues a creditable example in the matter of fielding. He put together three separate innings of over a hundred, increased his average by seven and finished with an aggregate of nearly a thousand." In fact, adding in his scores in one match for Marylebone Cricket Club (MCC), Ingle passed 1,000 runs for the second time in his career, and his season total of 1,083 runs at an average of 24.06 was his best in aggregate.

In fact, the following season, 1933, Ingle fared even better with the bat, though he missed out on 1,000 for the season by missing half a dozen games. His average of 29.74 for 922 runs in the season was his highest, and he scored two centuries. The team as a whole, however, fell from seventh to eleventh in the Championship.

Ingle's batting fell away rather badly after this high point. In the next three seasons, he struggled to average 15 runs an innings, though he made one further century in 1935. Wisden noted that Ingle had become "a member of a rather pronounced 'tail'."

Somerset returned to seventh place in the County Championship in 1936, but again it proved to be a temporary success. After the 1937 season, in which the county returned to the lower reaches of the championship table, Ingle stood down as captain, being replaced by his fellow Bath solicitor, Longrigg. He played a few matches for the county in both 1938 and 1939, but did not reappear in first-class cricket after the Second World War.

== Personal style ==
Ingle was a well-liked captain, according to David Foot's history of Somerset cricket, and unlike some Somerset amateurs got on well with the limited numbers of professionals the county employed. The life of a Somerset captain in the inter-war years was rarely easy, because the county rarely had more than half a dozen professionals, and the team was perennially made up of an itinerant band of amateurs of variable talent. In one of Ingle's more successful seasons, 1936, Somerset played 34 different cricketers in the County Championship matches. Ingle himself missed some games most seasons because of chronic hay fever which, according to Foot, he maintained was made worse by long train journeys: he told Foot that he would travel in the luggage rack to get some sleep and some respite from the dust.

Ingle was famously the captain when Harold Gimblett arrived at Frome as an unknown for his legendary first-class debut. Players such as Arthur Wellard, Horace Hazell, Wally Luckes and Bill Andrews played as professionals for Somerset for many seasons and developed under Ingle. Ingle, wrote Foot, "had a gift for what today is rather glibly known as motivation". But he could also be a disciplinarian, suspending two of the professionals for a couple of matches for misbehaviour and warning an amateur off for providing the professionals with duff horse-racing tips.

== After cricket and outside cricket ==
There is a suggestion in Ingle's obituary in the 1993 Wisden that the parting at the end of the 1937 season was less than amicable. "Ingle eventually resigned the captaincy, or was manoeuvred out of it, amid some bitterness," it said. "He rarely returned to the ground thereafter."

Ingle also had a long and successful law career in which, according to Foot, he acquired a reputation for taking on and winning cases for the gipsy community. He was also the defence solicitor for the celebrated postwar case of Ann Cornock, a Bristol woman accused of murdering her husband George Cornock in his bath in December 1946, a charge of which she was acquitted: Ingle attributed the result partly to the prestige of Sir Bernard Spilsbury, who had advised the defence, led by J. D. Casswell KC. Ingle told Foot that it was the Cornock case that had turned his hair white, though Foot added in his book that the cares of the Somerset captaincy were probably a contributory factor.

He was a member of the Bath and County Club.

Sporting positions
Preceded by Jack White	Somerset County Cricket Captain; 1932–1937	Succeeded by Bunty Longrigg
