= George Woodhouse =

English cricketer

Personal information
- Full name: George Edward Sealy Woodhouse
- Born: 15 February 1924; Blandford, Dorset, England
- Died: 19 January 1988 (aged 63); Blandford, Dorset, England
- Batting: Right-handed
- Bowling: Right-arm medium
- Role: Batsman

Domestic team information
- Years: Team
- 1946–1953: Somerset
- 1954–1964: Dorset
- First-class debut: 13 July 1946 Somerset v Middlesex
- Last First-class: 23 May 1953 Somerset v Gloucestershire

Career statistics
Competition	First-class
Matches	65
Runs scored	2048
Batting average	19.69
100s/50s	1/7
Top score	109
Balls bowled	24
Wickets	1
Bowling average	8.00
5 wickets in innings	0
10 wickets in match	0
Best bowling	1/8
Catches/stumpings	18/1
- Source: Cricinfo, 4 October 2009

George Edward Sealy Woodhouse DL (15 February 1924 – 19 January 1988) was a cricketer for Somerset and Dorset, and later, the chairman of the family brewing company Hall & Woodhouse from 1962 to until his death. As a cricketer, he was known as George Woodhouse; as a businessman, he was known as Edward Woodhouse.

== Cricket career ==
Woodhouse was a right-handed middle-order batsman, a very occasional medium-pace bowler and, once in his first-class career, a wicketkeeper. He played a couple of times for Somerset in 1946, and then fairly regularly in both 1947 and 1948, winning his county cap in 1947 after an innings of 109 against Leicestershire which proved to be his only first-class century.

In 1948, Somerset struggled to find a full-time captain, and Woodhouse officially shared the job with Mandy Mitchell-Innes and Jake Seamer, though at least two other players captained the side for occasional matches. In 1949, Woodhouse took over the captaincy full-time and played his only full season of cricket: he made 849 runs, though his highest score was only 59, at an average just below 20 runs an innings. He led the team to equal ninth in the County Championship table, and only three matches all season were drawn. But at the end of the season he stepped down to go into the family business, and he played only a few more times in first-class cricket, finally finishing in 1953.

Instead, he became a fairly regular player in Minor Counties cricket for Dorset, not retiring from second-class cricket until 1964.

== Business career ==
Hall & Woodhouse is a family owned brewery in Blandford Forum, and Edward Woodhouse was the fourth generation of his family to become chairman when he took over in 1962. His own sons Mark and Anthony are now in charge of the company, which has expanded significantly in the past 25 years.

Woodhouse was also a Deputy Lieutenant and High Sheriff of Dorset.

He died suddenly from a heart attack.

Sporting positions
Preceded by Jack Meyer	Somerset County Cricket Captain; 1948 (shared with Mandy Mitchell-Innes, Jake Seamer)	Succeeded by George Woodhouse
Preceded by Mandy Mitchell-Innes, George Woodhouse, Jake Seamer (shared)	Somerset County Cricket Captain; 1949	Succeeded by Stuart Rogers
