= Arthur Wellard =

English cricketer

Personal information
- Full name: Arthur William Wellard
- Born: 8 April 1902; Southfleet, Kent, England
- Died: 31 December 1980 (aged 78); Eastbourne, Sussex, England
- Batting: Right-handed
- Bowling: Right-arm fast-medium
- Role: All-rounder

International information
- National side: England
- Test debut (cap 296): 24 July 1937 v New Zealand
- Last Test: 24 June 1938 v Australia

Domestic team information
- Years: Team
- 1927–1950: Somerset

Career statistics
| Competition | Test | First-class |
|---|---|---|
| Matches | 2 | 417 |
| Runs scored | 47 | 12,485 |
| Batting average | 11.75 | 19.72 |
| 100s/50s | 0/0 | 2/59 |
| Top score | 38 | 112 |
| Balls bowled | 456 | 89,738 |
| Wickets | 7 | 1614 |
| Bowling average | 33.85 | 24.35 |
| 5 wickets in innings | 0 | 108 |
| 10 wickets in match | 0 | 24 |
| Best bowling | 4/81 | 8/52 |
| Catches/stumpings | 2/– | 377/– |
- Source: CricketArchive, 10 October 2009

Arthur William Wellard (8 April 1902 – 31 December 1980) was a cricketer who played for Somerset and England. A late starter in county cricket, having been told by his native county, Kent, that he would be better off taking up a career as a policeman, Wellard played on into his late 40s. He was a Wisden Cricketer of the Year in 1936.

Wellard was a fast-bowling all-rounder who exemplified much of the happy-go-lucky cricket played by Somerset in the 1930s. Despite a first-class batting average of only 19.72, he was famous for the number of sixes he hit, with over 500 in his career, accounting for a quarter of his runs. He was for many years the holder of the record number of sixes in a single season, with 72 in 1935. But Wellard as a fast bowler was good enough to be picked twice for England, against New Zealand in 1937 and against the Australians in 1938, and his 1,614 career wickets put him 63rd on the all-time bowling lists. Wellard was chosen in the England team to play three Tests in India in 1939–40, but the tour was cancelled due to the outbreak of World War II.

== Career ==
Wellard's first-class debut came at the age of 25 for Somerset against the touring New Zealanders. A further tourists match against the West Indians followed the following season, but he was unable to appear in the County Championship until he was qualified in 1929. He took 125 wickets in his maiden season in the tournament, finishing behind only Jack White in the club's tally for the year. He took ten wickets in a match for the first time during his fourth County Championship match for Somerset against the visiting Kent side, with figures of 6/108 & 4/28. He took five-wicket hauls in four out of five innings at the beginning of June 1929, with five in the only innings against Derbyshire, six in the first innings against Leicestershire, and another six in the first innings followed by five in the second innings when Gloucestershire visited Taunton.

On 24 August 1938, at Wells, Wellard thumped five sixes off an over from Kent's England allrounder Frank Woolley. This equalled a world record that lasted until Garry Sobers hit six sixes off Malcolm Nash in 1968. Wellard was well named: before Ian Botham struck 80 sixes in 1985, he was the only man to hit 50 in a season, which he did four times, including the round number of 66 sixes in 1935.

Wellard played county cricket with Boss Meyer, the founder of Millfield School. Meyer was a well known eccentric and allegedly in 1947, Wellard who was even older than Meyer, was bowling rather well, when Northamptonshire batsman Dennis Brookes played a false stroke through the slips which Meyer, too crippled by lumbago to bend down, failed to catch. Meyer reached into his back pocket and said, "Sorry Arthur, here's a quid."
