= John Barnwell (cricketer) =

English cricketer

Personal information
- Full name: Charles John Patrick Barnwell
- Born: 23 June 1914; Stoke-on-Trent, Staffordshire, England
- Died: 4 September 1998 (aged 84); Fivehead, Somerset, England
- Batting: Right-handed
- Bowling: Right-arm medium
- Role: Batsman
- Relatives: Michael Barnwell (nephew)

Domestic team information
- Years: Team
- 1935–1948: Somerset
- FC debut: 12 June 1935 Somerset v Gloucestershire
- Last FC: 1 July 1948 Somerset v Lancashire

Career statistics
Competition	First-class
Matches	69
Runs scored	1,592
Batting average	15.16
100s/50s	0/5
Top score	83
Balls bowled	52
Wickets	0
Bowling average	–
5 wickets in innings	–
10 wickets in match	–
Best bowling	–
Catches/stumpings	18/–
- Source: CricketArchive, 22 September 2008

Charles John Patrick Barnwell (23 June 1914 – 4 September 1998) played first-class cricket for Somerset as an amateur player before and after the Second World War. He was born at Stoke-on-Trent in 1914.

John Barnwell was a right-handed batsman who, in a team with a large number of all-rounders, frequently batted as low as No 8 or 9 in the order. He sometimes captained the team in the absence of the regular captains Reggie Ingle and Bunty Longrigg. He was also known as a good fielder in the covers.

Educated at Repton, Barnwell first appeared for Somerset in 1935, and played 11 matches the following year, though with a highest score of 38 he made little impact. In 1937, he played only seven games, but passed 50 for the first time with 73 in the match against Gloucestershire at Taunton.

In 1938 and 1939, and again in the first post-war season of 1946, Barnwell appeared in more than half Somerset's first-class matches, although he failed to top 400 runs in any season. In 1938, batting at No 9, he made an unbeaten 49 and shared a partnership for the eighth wicket of 143 with Longrigg which was a county record until beaten by Viv Richards and Ian Botham in 1983. His best season was 1939, when he made 396 runs, including his career-best of 83 against Hampshire at Taunton.

After the 1946 season, Barnwell was allegedly offered the captaincy of Somerset, but turned it down, and appeared for the county only once more, in 1948.

His career outside cricket was as a farmer, breeding silver foxes for the fur trade. According to another account by the same author, he "personified the 'old school', a debonair amateur... Rightly proud of his nimbleness in the covers and the four boundaries in a row he once audaciously took off Voce at Trent Bridge."

His nephew, Michael Barnwell, played cricket for Cambridge University, Somerset and Eastern Province in the 1960s and 1970s. He died at Fivehead in Somerset in 1998.
