= Jack Meyer (educator and cricketer) =

English educationalist

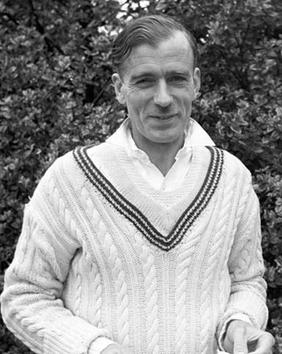

Personal information
- Full name: Rollo John Oliver Meyer
- Born: 15 March 1905; Clophill, Bedfordshire, England
- Died: 9 March 1991 (aged 85); Kingsdown, Bristol, England
- Nickname: Boss
- Batting: Right-handed
- Bowling: Right-arm slow-medium
- Role: All-rounder

Domestic team information
- Years: Team
- 1924–1926: Cambridge University
- 1924–1929: Minor Counties
- 1926/27–1934/35: Europeans
- 1926/27: Bombay
- 1929–1949: Free Foresters
- 1929–1950: MCC
- 1933/34–1934/35: Western India
- 1936–1949: Somerset
- FC debut: 10 May 1924 Cambridge University v Lancashire
- Last FC: 22 July 1950 MCC v Minor Counties

Career statistics
Competition	First-class
Matches	127
Runs scored	4,621
Batting average	23.69
100s/50s	2/24
Top score	202*
Balls bowled	21,965
Wickets	408
Bowling average	25.31
5 wickets in innings	25
10 wickets in match	3
Best bowling	9/160
Catches/stumpings	85/–
- Source: CricketArchive, 26 November 2007

Rollo John Oliver Meyer (15 March 1905 – 9 March 1991) was an English educationalist and first-class cricketer who founded Millfield School in 1935 and Millfield Preparatory School in 1946.

An all-round sportsman, Meyer played first-class cricket in both England and India.

== Early life ==
Born at Clophill, Bedfordshire, the second and surviving son of clergyman Revd Rollo Meyer (1868–1953) and Arabella Ward (1876–1960), the family moved to Watton-at-Stone, Hertfordshire in January 1911 when Rollo became the rector there, and Jack grew up in the village rectory overlooking the new cricket field. The teenage Jack played several cricket games for the village team. In 1923 a young Alan Turing stayed at the Meyer rectory home for the summer, the Turings being family friends. Jack was educated at Haileybury College, where he stood out as a cricketer.

Meyer was a forceful right-handed batsman and a right-arm bowler of medium pace picked out by the Wisden chronicler of public schools cricket of the time, H. S. Altham, for the amount of bowling work he got through, the maintenance of line and length in his varied bowling, and his flair for the "big" occasion. He went up to Pembroke College, Cambridge between 1923 and 1926, where he graduated with a double first in classics, before going to India to work as a cotton broker for 10 years.

== The educator ==
=== Millfield ===
Meyer was accompanied on his return to England from India in the mid-1930s by seven young Indian aristocrats, including six princes, having been entrusted with providing them an education. He set up Millfield School in Street in Somerset in 1935 and remained as its headmaster for the next 35 years. He was known as Boss at school. The new school theatre at Millfield is named after him.

Millfield from the outset was an unconventional public school, with an emphasis on all-round excellence, and not just the academic, including strength in areas such as sports and the arts. Meyer had a flexible attitude towards school fees, charging wealthy parents some of the highest in the UK but waiving them entirely for some pupils whom he considered deserving. Meyer's philosophy at Millfield was, "...to nurture talent by providing the very best facilities, teaching, coaching and opportunities in which young people can exercise and explore their abilities; and to give awards to those in financial need."

Meyer strongly believed in the benefits of corporal punishment. "Most juvenile delinquents are suffering from too few beatings when young. It’s not love they lack, but discipline.”

Links between Millfield and Somerset County Cricket Club remained close; in 1960, Meyer recruited Colin Atkinson, who had played Minor County cricket, on to the Millfield staff. Atkinson played regularly for Somerset from 1960 to 1962, and then was released from school duties to captain the county side from 1965 to 1967. When Meyer retired as headmaster of Millfield in 1971, Atkinson succeeded him.

=== After Millfield ===
Meyer then went to Greece where he took charge of a newly established English-language school, Campion. He remained headmaster for seven years and inspired a number of tales of his eccentricity which were still being recounted two decades later. In 1980 Meyer split with the school and founded the English-language school St Lawrence College at Athens.

== The cricketer ==
At Cambridge, Meyer made an immediate impact in cricket, taking nine wickets in the Freshmen's Match at the start of the summer term in 1924. He took four wickets in the first first-class innings he bowled in and retained his place in the university side for the whole season, winning his Blue. After the university term was over, he played Minor Counties cricket for Hertfordshire, scoring a lot of runs and taking 51 wickets at low cost. He was picked for the Minor Counties representative side which was accorded a first-class match against the South African touring team and his six wickets for 60 runs in the South Africans' first innings put the Minor Counties on the way to a surprise victory by 25 runs. He was then called up for the Gentlemen v Players match at Blackpool and responded by taking eight Players' wickets for 38 runs in the first innings, a feat that did not prevent the Players from winning rather easily in a match that Wisden deemed "by no means worthy of its high-sounding title".

Meyer retained his place in the Cambridge sides of 1925 and 1926, batting fairly low in the order and taking regular wickets. Less than three months after his final University Match appearance in July 1926, he was working as a cotton broker in India and turning out for the Europeans in the final of the Bombay Quadrangular Tournament. Over the following Indian cricket season he played four times in matches against the touring side from the Marylebone Cricket Club (MCC) led by Arthur Gilligan, including one appearance for the full India side.

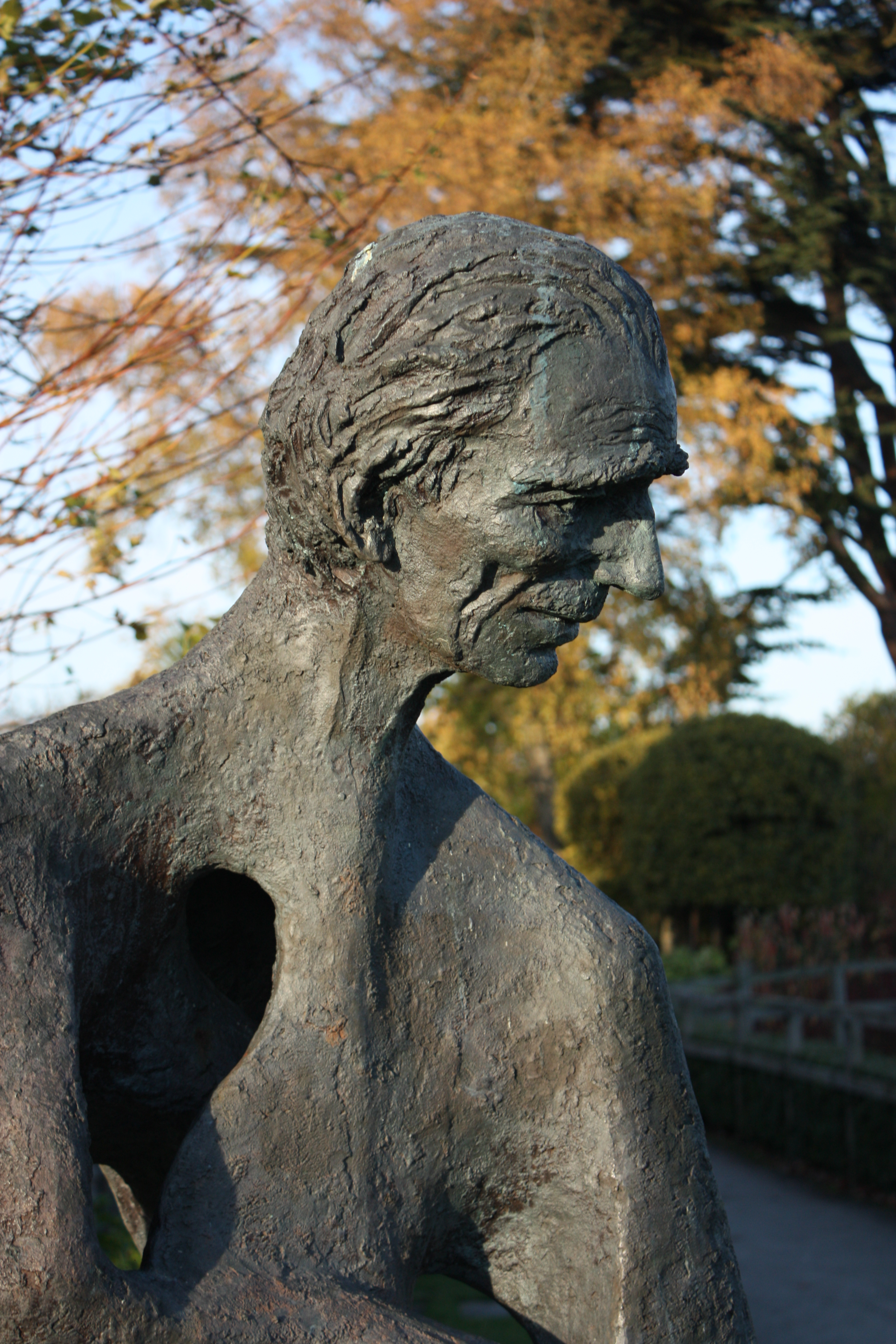
Boss Meyer's bust at Millfield School, Somerset

Meyer stayed in India for nine years and played first-class cricket in several Indian seasons. In the 1927–28 season he played only two games, both for the Europeans in the Bombay tournament, but took 28 wickets in these matches, including his career-best nine for 160 in the final against the Hindus when he finished with match figures of 16 wickets for 188 runs. In 1929, in a summer spent in England, he played Minor Counties cricket for Hertfordshire again and in several first-class matches for amateur teams against the universities, and in his last season in India, 1934–35, he captained the Western India side in two matches in the Ranji Trophy.

The second stage of Meyer's cricket career began after his return to England to set up Millfield School in Somerset. From the 1936 season, he appeared in Somerset matches, almost always those in the second half of the season when the school term had ended and, with rare exceptions, those played at home. In these games, he played as an all-rounder, his batting having improved significantly since his Cambridge days. Against Lancashire at Taunton in the last match of the 1936 season, he rescued Somerset from likely defeat with his maiden century, an undefeated 202, scored in 225 minutes. There is no doubt of the innings' merit – Somerset were still 48 behind with half their second innings wickets gone – but there is an oft-repeated story that the double century was obtained by an offer to contribute to the Lancashire beneficiary's fund. And he got a second century the following year against Sussex. As a bowler, he managed at least one five-wicket innings haul in each of the four seasons running up to the Second World War, though his bowling was an increasingly idiosyncratic mixture of spin and swing. During the War, he served in the Royal Air Force.

After the War, Meyer resumed his pre-war pattern of late summer home games in 1946, but then, in 1947, at the age of 42, allowed himself his solitary season of full-time cricket as Somerset captain. By this stage, he was badly affected by lumbago, and though he scored 850 runs and took 43 wickets, the season was not a success for Somerset, and he stood down at the end of the year. He played a couple of first-class matches in each of the next three seasons, and then retired from cricket to concentrate full-time on school-mastership and developing his school at Millfield.

== Personality ==
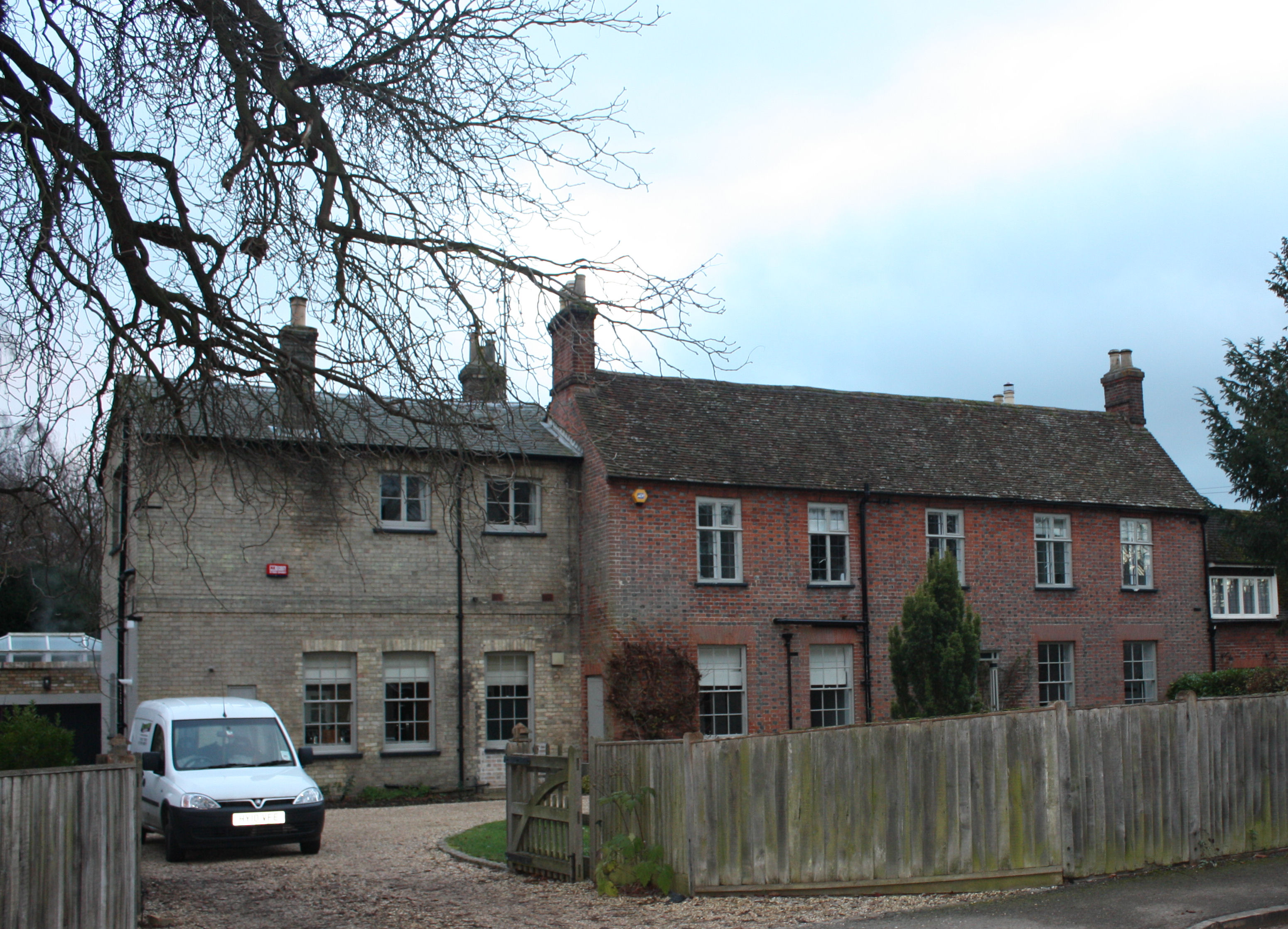
The Old Rectory Clophill, Meyer's bithplace

Meyer was a restless character, and tales of eccentric behaviour are not confined to the cricket pitch; some examples include:

- Apparently in a 1947 county game, the Somerset cricketer Arthur Wellard, even older than Meyer, was bowling rather well, when Northamptonshire batsman Dennis Brookes played a false stroke through the slips which Meyer, too crippled by lumbago to bend down, failed to catch. Meyer reached into his back pocket: "Sorry Arthur, here's a quid."
- He once pulled the communication cord on the Manchester train so that his players could get some food.
- In a match interrupted by rain, Somerset took the field with only 10 men until Meyer appeared under a large red umbrella.
- Meyer allegedly needed little sleep, which he would take in the headmaster's study. He carried a horse racing form book along with other more academic works and on occasion went to London where he wagered large sums of money in gambling casinos, often losing the lot.

== Family ==
Meyer, who had two brothers and a sister, married in 1931 Joyce Symons, leaving two daughters.

Sporting positions
Preceded by Bunty Longrigg	Somerset County Cricket Captain; 1947	Succeeded by Mandy Mitchell-Innes, George Woodhouse, Jake Seamer (shared)
