= Mandy Mitchell-Innes =

English cricketer

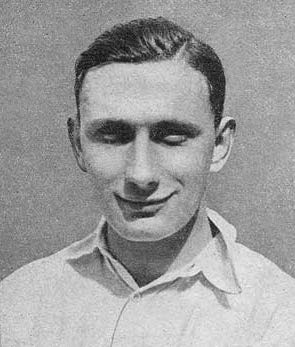

Personal information
- Full name: Norman Stewart Mitchell-Innes
- Born: 7 September 1914; Calcutta, India
- Died: 28 December 2006 (aged 92); Monmouthshire, Wales
- Batting: Right-handed
- Bowling: Right-arm medium, fast

International information
- National side: England
- Only Test (cap 283): 15 June 1935 v South Africa

Domestic team information
- Years: Team
- 1931–1949: Somerset
- 1934–1937: Oxford University

Career statistics
Competition	Test	First-class
Matches	1	132
Runs scored	5	6,944
Batting average	5.00	31.42
100s/50s	0/0	13/32
Top score	5	207
Balls bowled	–	4,897
Wickets	–	82
Bowling average	–	34.70
5 wickets in innings	–	0
10 wickets in match	–	0
Best bowling	–/–	4/65
Catches/stumpings	0/–	151/–
- Source: CricketArchive, 9 October 2014

Norman Stewart "Mandy" Mitchell-Innes (7 September 1914 – 28 December 2006) was an amateur cricketer for Somerset, who played in one Test match for England in 1935. Between 1931 and 1949 Mitchell-Innes played 132 first-class matches, appearing 69 times for Somerset, and 43 times for Oxford University. In these matches he scored 6,944 runs, including 13 centuries and a top score of 207. He was well-regarded for the grace of his batting, but his cricket career was limited by both hay fever and his overseas work commitments.

Mitchell-Innes made his debut for Somerset while he was still a schoolboy at Sedbergh School in 1931. He subsequently went to Oxford University and appeared in the annual match against Cambridge in each of his four years. His total of 3,319 first-class runs is a record for the Oxford University team, and he is regarded as one of the best university cricketers ever. After completing each year at Oxford, he returned to play for Somerset. He played his best years of cricket while at university, passing 1,000 runs in the season during three of his four years there. After graduating from university, he joined the Sudan Political Service and missed the 1938 cricket season entirely. He was only available for Somerset during periods of leave thereafter, often playing for around four to six weeks. In 1948, he was one of three players to captain Somerset when the county struggled to appoint anyone on a permanent basis. He played his last first-class matches in 1949.

Mitchell-Innes left the Sudan Political Service in 1954, and became the company secretary at Vaux Breweries. Upon the death of Alf Gover in October 2001, he became England's oldest surviving Test cricketer until his own death in December 2006, when the distinction passed to Ken Cranston.

== Early life ==
Norman Stewart Mitchell-Innes was born in Calcutta on 7 September 1914, where his father was a businessman of Scottish descent. Both his father, also named Norman, and his grandfather, Gilbert, were keen golfers. The former was the All India Amateur Golf Champion in 1893 and 1894, while the latter captained Prestwick Golf Club. He moved to England with his family at the age of five to live in Minehead, Somerset, and gained a scholarship to Sedbergh School based in Cumbria. At Sedbergh he developed quickly as a cricketer, first playing for the school's first team aged 15. The subsequent year, he scored 302 not out in a house match in one afternoon. In the summer of 1931, after scoring two half-centuries for Sedbergh against Durham School and Stonyhurst College, Mitchell-Innes was called up to play for Somerset County Cricket Club in a County Championship match against Warwickshire. He had to travel down from Scotland by overnight train for the fixture at the County Ground, Taunton. He took two wickets, and scored 23 runs in the match, which was drawn.

In both 1932 and 1933, Mitchell-Innes captained the Sedbergh School cricket team, and was invited to play at Lord's Cricket Ground for representative school sides, and he also made eight further County Championship appearances for Somerset. He failed to make a mark for the county in 1932, recording a batting average of 6.50, but in 1933 he achieved his first half-century in first-class cricket, scoring 57 against Warwickshire, before hitting his own wicket. In a review of their cricket side in July 1933, The Sedberghian says of Mitchell-Innes that "such cricketers seldom come this way", praising his consistency, fielding and captaincy, though it does note that his off drive often failed to score him boundaries, and that his bowling lacked accuracy at times. Mitchell-Innes also played fives and rugby for the school, and was president of the debating society. On completion of his studies at Sedbergh, he won an exhibition to study law at Brasenose College, Oxford.

Mitchell-Innes was selected for the university cricket team during his first year at Oxford and made his debut against Gloucestershire. He scored his maiden first-class century in the first innings of the match which Oxford nearly won. He achieved two further centuries for Oxford that year, hitting 140 runs against the Minor Counties in a high-scoring draw, and then 171 against Surrey at The Oval. In all matches for the university that season he scored 998 runs at an average of 55.44, leading Oxford batsman that year, though Fredrick de Saram scored more runs. Mitchell-Innes won his Blue—the awarding of the Oxford "colours" to sportsmen—by appearing in the 1934 University match against Cambridge, a match in which he batted with moderate success, scoring 27 and 42 in a drawn match. In comparison to his performances for Oxford, Mitchell-Innes struggled during his eleven first-class matches for Somerset that summer: he averaged 20.93, and only passed fifty runs once, against Sussex. In the same match, he recorded the best bowling figures of his first-class career, taking four wickets for 65 runs. Mitchell-Innes' performances during the season earned him selection for the Gentlemen against Players fixture at Folkestone.

== England Test recognition ==
The Oxford cricket historian Geoffrey Bolton describes the next two years as being "full of disappointment" for Oxford. Partially indicative of this, Mitchell-Innes once again topped the batting averages, and led all Oxford batsmen in terms of runs scored, but his figures were in stark contrast to the previous year: he averaged 38.70 for his 774 runs. He hit centuries against Lancashire and Surrey, and against the touring South Africans. His score of 168 against South Africa helped gain Oxford a first innings lead, though the match finished a draw. Amongst the crowd for the match was Pelham Warner, one of the selectors for the England cricket team, who enjoyed the innings so much that he invited Mitchell-Innes to play against South Africa in the first Test match at Trent Bridge. In a three-day match curtailed by rain, Mitchell-Innes batted once, scoring five runs before being trapped leg before wicket by Bruce Mitchell. He was retained for the second Test, but was suffering badly from hay fever, and wrote to Warner to advise him that, "I might be sneezing just as a catch came in the slips." Warner agreed, and called up Errol Holmes to replace him – Mitchell-Innes never got another chance to play for England. Hay fever also curtailed Mitchell-Innes' performance during the university match: despite being described as "the best batsman on either side" by Bolton, he was dismissed for scores of one and nought as Cambridge won by 195 runs.

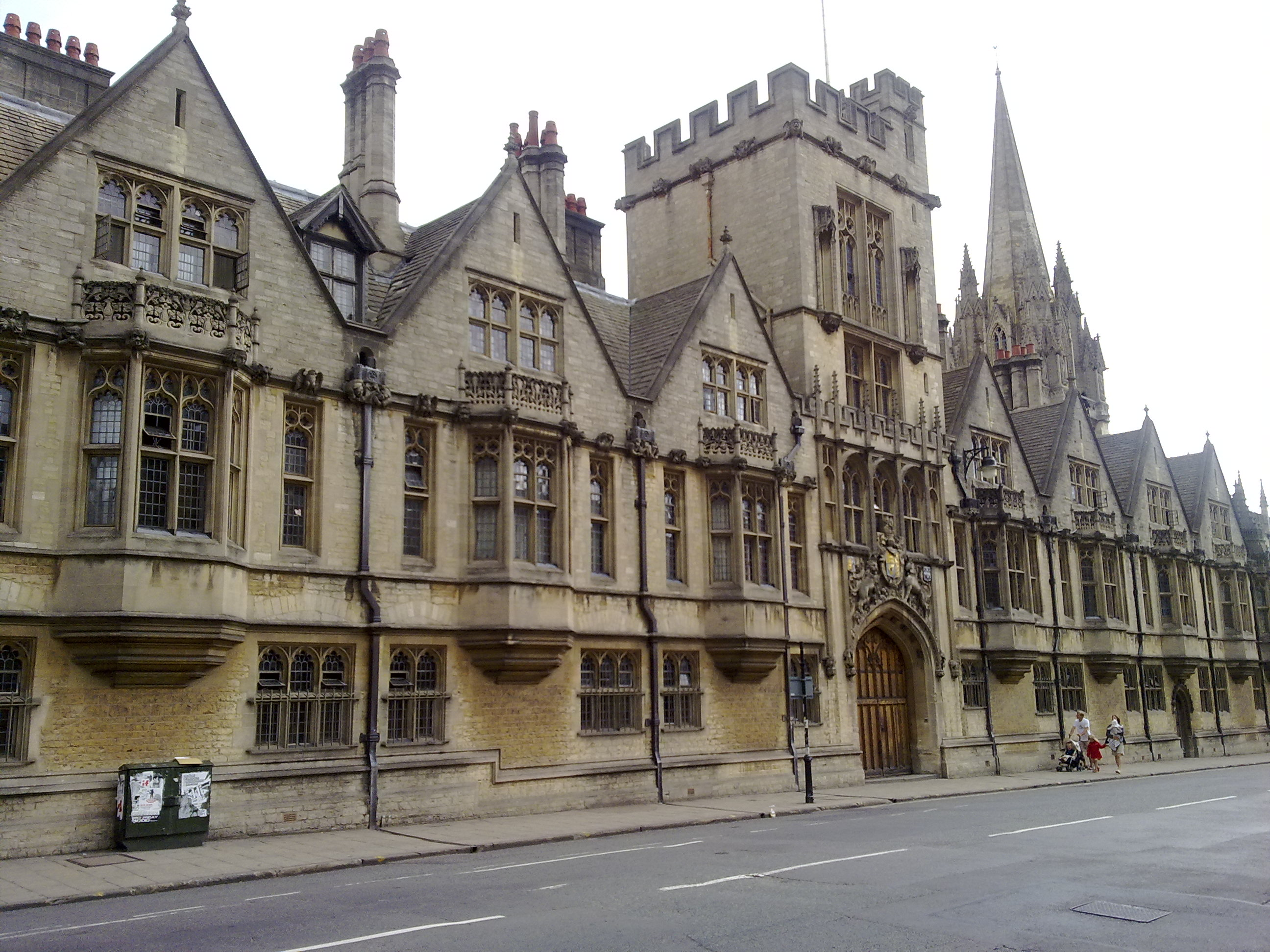
Brasenose College, Oxford, which Mitchell-Innes attended in the 1930s.

Shortly after the university match, Mitchell-Innes was once again invited to play for the Gentlemen against the Players, on this occasion in the more prestigious Lord's fixture. Returning to Somerset for his summer break, Mitchell-Innes struck his first century in county cricket, hitting 139 runs as Somerset followed on against Lancashire. He appeared in seven of Somerset's twenty-six fixtures, and although he was well short of his teammates' total runs for the season, he led Somerset's batting averages in 1935, accruing his 420 runs at an average of 38.18. At the end of the summer, he was chosen to play for an "England XI" against South Africa during the Folkestone cricket festival, though in a resounding victory for the tourists, he failed to make much impact.

After the English cricket team's tour of Australia in 1932–33, known for the Bodyline bowling tactics used by the English team, relations between the Australian Board of Control and the Marylebone Cricket Club (MCC) were strained. In the English winter of 1935–36, the MCC sent a team to tour Australia and New Zealand, in an attempt to regain some good will in Australia. Holmes captained the side, which was predominantly composed of younger players the MCC wanted to gain experience. Mitchell-Innes was included in the touring party, and played in ten first-class matches, including two of the four contests against the New Zealand national cricket team. He scored four first-class half-centuries, achieving his highest score of the tour against Otago, when he contributed 87 runs to the MCC's total of 550.

== Later University years ==
In 1936 Mitchell-Innes was elected captain of the Oxford team. The side lacked the batting strength of the previous years, and he was forced to move himself from his preferred position of batting at number three or four, to open the batting during the season. The batting suffered a further blow just prior to the university match when Roger Kimpton suffered an injury and was unable to play. Along with Kimpton, Mitchell-Innes led the batting averages by a large margin, having scored 917 runs at 43.66. He also reached his highest score in first-class cricket against H. D. G. Leveson Gower's XI, scoring 207 runs. Oxford lost more matches than they won during the season, including an eight-wicket loss to Cambridge in the university match. Despite the loss, the match was Mitchell-Innes' most successful contest against Cambridge, as he scored 43 and 84. During this season, Mitchell-Innes had his most effective spell as a bowler, taking 22 wickets for Oxford at an average of 26.27, but Bolton described the team's bowling performances as unremarkable.

Before returning to play for Somerset, Mitchell-Innes once again featured for the Gentlemen at Lord's, though in a low-scoring match, he was dismissed for less than 20 runs in each innings. In six matches for Somerset in July and August, Mitchell-Innes scored 499 runs, and his average of 55.44 was the county's best that season. He scored 182, his best score for Somerset, in a County Championship match against Worcestershire, and followed it up with another century in the next match, against Lancashire. In all, 1936 was statistically Mitchell-Innes' best season; he scored 1,438 runs at an average of 44.93.

In 1937, Mitchell-Innes was replaced as captain of Oxford by Sandy Singleton, and missed the start of the cricket season as he was busy studying. He did not play his first match until the middle of June, when he scored 137 and 66 not out against Leicestershire; his first innings total being described as "by far the best seen at Oxford this year." Later in the month, he scored another century to help Oxford chase 347 runs in the fourth innings of the match to beat Sussex. In the lead up to the university match, Mitchell-Innes was "regarded as the outstanding batsman of the two sides" by The Times, but he did not bat well in the first innings, and was out for 19 runs. In the second innings, he fared a little better, scoring 29 runs to help Oxford to a seven wicket victory; their only win in the university match during Mitchell-Innes' time at Oxford. He topped the batting averages for Oxford once again, scoring his 630 runs at an average of 57.27. In all, during his four years at Oxford, he scored 3,319 first-class runs, a record for the university, at an average of 47.41.

Shortly after the university match, Mitchell-Innes made his fourth appearance in as many years for the Gentlemen against the Players, but after being asked to the open the innings was out for just four runs in the first innings. He improved in the second innings, scoring fifty runs after an indifferent start, but was unable to prevent his side losing by eight wickets. He subsequently top-scored for Scotland in a first-class match against the touring New Zealanders. In seven appearances for Somerset during the seasons, Mitchell-Innes was unable to replicate the form he had shown with Oxford, and only passed fifty run in an innings once, scoring 135 runs at an average of under ten.

== Occasional county cricketer ==
While at Oxford, Mitchell-Innes had become good friends with Jake Seamer, who had also attended Brasenose College, and the pair were teammates for both Oxford and Somerset. Seamer had joined the Sudan Political Service (SPS) on his graduation in 1936, and while at Oxford, Mitchell-Innes also secured a role with the organisation that he would take up after his graduation. His duties with the SPS prevented him from playing for Somerset at all during 1938, but he made seven early-season appearances the following year, though two were for the Marylebone Cricket Club and the Free Foresters. It was for the latter of these that Mitchell-Innes made his only century of the season; playing against Oxford University, the Free Foresters required nearly 400 runs in the fourth innings to win. Mitchell-Innes opened the innings, and after the lunch interval on the final day he played attacking cricket, bringing up his century in 95 minutes. He was eventually dismissed for 143 runs, bowled as he tried to heave an on drive. The Free Foresters came within nine runs of their target, but were bowled out before they could reach it. In total, he scored 347 runs at 31.54 that year; the last season of first-class county cricket in England before it was interrupted by the Second World War.

In 1946, Mitchell-Innes was only able to play for the first month of the season, appearing in six first-class matches. He only passed fifty once in those matches, when he scored 55 runs against Middlesex. The cricket correspondent for The Times said that "he has lost none of the skill which stamped him before the war as one of the best batsmen". The following season, Mitchell-Innes appeared seven times, all in the County Championship. He averaged 37, his highest total after leaving university, and scored four half-centuries.

Somersetshire will be captained by three amateurs in rotation, N. S. Mitchell-Innes in May, J. W. Seamer in June and part of July and G. E. S. Woodhouse for the rest of the season.

— Manchester Guardian, 1948

Mitchell-Innes was named as one of three captains of Somerset in 1948. Jack Meyer had reluctantly captained the side in 1947, but stepped down at the end of the season: he was having problems with his sight, and required daily painkillers for lumbago. There was no obvious replacement for Meyer; like many counties Somerset would not consider having a professional captain, and finding an amateur with the time and money to lead the side was proving troublesome. So, with no single candidate suitable, the Somerset committee announced that the club would be captained first by Mitchell-Innes during his leave from the Sudan, then Seamer during his own leave. Once both of these had returned to their duties, George Woodhouse would take over. In his history of Somerset County Cricket Club, Peter Roebuck describes the situation as a "remarkable state of affairs", while David Foot suggests that the true number of captains was closer to seven.

Mitchell-Innes appeared in Somerset's opening five fixtures; including a pre-season friendly match against Glamorgan. During a season which the Somerset County Herald speculated would be "unpredictable" and lacking the "exaggerated optimism" of 1947, the county club lost all five matches in which Mitchell-Innes was captain. Mitchell-Innes scored 222 runs, including a solitary half-century, during a 10-wicket loss to Middlesex. After Denis Compton and Bill Edrich had scored 252 and 168 respectively, Mitchell-Innes was one of few Somerset players to bat with any confidence in the first-innings, scoring 65 runs. When Mitchell-Innes left the team for the Sudan, they were bottom of the County Championship with no points; they finished the season 12th of 17 after collecting 92 points, including five wins. Batting was identified as Somerset's weakest area in both 1947 and 1948; Mitchell-Innes' batting average of 22.20 placed him sixth in the county averages in 1948. The following year, Woodhouse took over as Somerset captain full-time. Mitchell-Innes was once again available for the first few weeks of the season, playing seven matches. He finished near the bottom of Somerset's batting averages, having scored 157 runs at 11.21; the second-lowest average of his career. It was his last season of first-class cricket, and he played his final match in May 1949 against Hampshire.

== Later life ==
He left the Sudan Political Service in 1954, and was company secretary of Vaux Breweries in Sunderland for 25 years. He married Patricia Rossiter in 1944, and they had a son and daughter together. He retired to Herefordshire in 1980, and lived with his daughter in Monmouthshire after his wife died in 1989. Upon the death of Alf Gover in October 2001, Mitchell-Innes became the oldest living England Test cricketer. Mitchell-Innes died on 28 December 2006, and was survived by a son and daughter. Upon his death, Ken Cranston became England's oldest living Test cricketer.

== Bibliography ==
- Bolton, Geoffrey (1962). History of the O.U.C.C. (First ed.). Oxford: Holywell Press Ltd.
- Foot, David (22 February 1986). Sunshine, Sixes and Cider: The History of Somerset Cricket (1986 ed.). Newton Abbot, Devon: David & Charles. ISBN 0-7153-8890-8.
- Roebuck, Peter (22 February 1991). From Sammy to Jimmy: The Official History of Somerset County Cricket Club (1991 ed.). London: Partridge Press. ISBN 1-85225-085-2.

Sporting positions
Preceded by Jack Meyer	Somerset County Cricket Captain; 1948 (shared with George Woodhouse, Jake Seamer)	Succeeded by George Woodhouse
