= Michael Walford =

English sportsman

Micky Walford
Personal information
- Full name: Michael Moore Walford
- Born: 27 November 1915; Norton-on-Tees, County Durham, England
- Died: 16 January 2002 (aged 86); Sherborne, Dorset, England
- Batting: Right-handed
- Bowling: Left-arm slow
- Role: Batsman

Domestic team information
- Years: Team
- 1935–1938: Oxford University
- 1946–1953: Somerset
- 1950–1951: Marylebone Cricket Club (MCC)
- First-class debut: 11 May 1935 Oxford University v Lancashire
- Last First-class: 1 September 1953 Somerset v Nottinghamshire

Career statistics
Competition	First-class
Matches	97
Runs scored	5327
Batting average	33.71
100s/50s	9/28
Top score	264
Balls bowled	381
Wickets	8
Bowling average	31.12
5 wickets in innings	1
10 wickets in match	–
Best bowling	6/49
Catches/stumpings	50/–
- Source: CricketArchive, 12 July 2011

Olympic medal record

Men's field hockey
Silver medal – second place	1948 London	Team competition

Michael Moore Walford (27 November 1915 – 16 January 2002), often known as "Micky Walford", was an all-round sportsman: a British field hockey player who competed in the 1948 Summer Olympics, a first-class cricket player for Oxford University and Somerset and a rugby union centre three-quarter and stand-off half good enough to play in an international trial for the England national rugby union team. He was born at Norton-on-Tees, County Durham and died at Sherborne, Dorset, where he was for many years a schoolmaster at Sherborne School.

He was a member of the British field hockey team at the 1948 summer Olympic Games, held in London. The team won the silver medal. He played all five matches as half-back.

== Background and education ==
Walford was educated at Rugby School, where he was in the rugby, hockey and cricket teams. As a school cricketer, he was a middle order batsman and a slow left-arm bowler and he appeared in the schools match at Lord's against Marlborough College, part of the annual public schools games held each year at the then "headquarters" of cricket, in four consecutive years from 1931 to 1934. He was captain of the cricket team at the school in 1934. In 1934, he played for the "Lord's Schools" side against "The Rest" in the annual match of the best of the public school cricketers, and then for the "Public Schools" side chosen to play The Army cricket team.

As a rugby player, he first came to prominence as a 17-year-old when he was named as one of the centre three-quarters in the England public schoolboys' rugby team to play Scotland in the annual match at the start of 1933. In the same fixture in the 1933/34 season Walford's defensive play was singled out in the report in The Times as a factor in the English side's victory.

== University sporting career ==
Walford was playing county standard rugby union before he went up to Trinity College, Oxford, in autumn 1934. At Oxford, his first sporting success in November 1934 was to be selected for the university's hockey team, where he played at centre half. But within four weeks he was also playing for the rugby first fifteen as several players were rested in advance of the University Match. Hockey, however, remained Walford's main winter game in his first year at Oxford and he was awarded his Blue by the hockey captain, Jake Seamer, later to be a cricket colleague at Somerset: the match with Cambridge finished as a goal-less draw.
