= Fred Castle (cricketer) =

English cricketer and schoolmaster

Personal information
- Full name: Frederick Castle
- Born: 8 April 1909; Elham, Kent, England
- Died: 17 May 1997 (aged 88); Portscatho, Cornwall, England
- Batting: Right-handed
- Bowling: Right-arm leg-break
- Role: Middle-order batsman

Domestic team information
- Years: Team
- 1946–1949: Somerset
- First-class debut: 8 June 1946 Somerset v Gloucestershire
- Last First-class: 27 June 1949 Somerset v Middlesex

Career statistics
| Competition | First-class |
|---|---|
| Matches | 23 |
| Runs scored | 686 |
| Batting average | 20.78 |
| 100s/50s | 0/4 |
| Top score | 60* |
| Balls bowled | 79 |
| Wickets | 1 |
| Bowling average | 43.00 |
| 5 wickets in innings | 0 |
| 10 wickets in match | 0 |
| Best bowling | 1/16 |
| Catches/stumpings | 6/– |
- Source: CricketArchive, 23 November 2008

Frederick Castle (8 April 1909 – 17 May 1997) was a schoolmaster in Bath, Somerset, who played first-class cricket for Somerset County Cricket Club in the school holidays for the four summers immediately after the Second World War.

A right-handed middle-order batsman and an occasional leg-break bowler, Castle played second eleven cricket for his native Kent in the Minor Counties in the early 1930s. According to a history of Somerset cricket, he was offered a contract as a professional by Kent "who liked the look of his assertive mid-order batting".

Moving to Somerset as headmaster of Oldfield Boys' School, a secondary modern school in Bath, he made his first-class cricket debut in 1946 in the Whitsun match against Gloucestershire, scoring 30 in his only innings. He reappeared in the three matches of the Bath cricket festival and then played regularly in the summer holidays. In 13 matches in the 1946 season, he scored 311 runs at an average of 18.29 runs per innings, with a highest score of 60 not out in an overwhelming two-day victory over Surrey at Weston-super-Mare. This remained his highest first-class score. He captained the side in the match against Lancashire at Old Trafford, but Somerset were bowled out twice in a day and lost the match by an innings.

In his three other seasons, he played much less often, and seven of his 10 first-class matches in 1947, 1948 and 1949 were at Bath. He scored one fifty in each of the three seasons, but never reached 60 again. In 1948, when Somerset failed to find an amateur captain who could spare the time to lead the side throughout the summer, he captained the county again in one match, declaring when he was 59 not out and then leading his side to an innings victory over Nottinghamshire.

Castle was an all-round sportsman, playing field hockey for both Kent and Somerset and football for Crystal Palace F.C. He had non-sporting interests too: as a baritone in amateur concerts and dramatics, and as a conjurer.
