= Bunty Longrigg =

English cricketer (1906-1974)

Personal information
- Full name: Edmund Fallowfield Longrigg
- Born: 16 April 1906; Batheaston, Somerset, England
- Died: 23 July 1974 (aged 68); Bath, Somerset, England
- Nickname: Bunty
- Batting: Left-handed
- Bowling: Right-arm slow
- Role: Batsman

Domestic team information
- Years: Team
- 1925–1947: Somerset
- 1926–1928: Cambridge University
- FC debut: 12 August 1925 Somerset v Hampshire
- Last FC: 27 June 1947 Somerset v Cambridge University

Career statistics
Competition	First-class
Matches	248
Runs scored	9,416
Batting average	24.64
100s/50s	10/46
Top score	205
Balls bowled	152
Wickets	1
Bowling average	100.00
5 wickets in innings	0
10 wickets in match	0
Best bowling	1/7
Catches/stumpings	143/–
- Source: CricketArchive, 6 July 2008

Edmund Fallowfield Longrigg, usually known as Bunty Longrigg (16 April 1906 – 23 July 1974), played cricket for Somerset and Cambridge University. He was captain of Somerset from 1938 to 1946 and later prominent in the county club administration. He was born at Batheaston, Somerset and died at Bath, Somerset.

== Early career ==
Bunty Longrigg was a left-handed middle order batsman and an occasional right-arm bowler. The son of Major G. E. Longrigg, who was a long-time Somerset county cricket committeeman and a solicitor in Bath, the younger Longrigg was educated at Rugby School, and made his Somerset debut in 1925, the year he left school. In his third match, he hit an unbeaten 60 against Kent in a rain-ruined match at Taunton.

In 1926, he was at Cambridge University and arrived with a glowing testimonial in the 1926 Wisden Cricketers' Almanack report on 1925 public school cricket by H. S. Altham. "His record of 840 runs for an average of over 50 was remarkable," Altham wrote. "Above all he watches the ball, and is hard to bowl out. What with his success for Somerset in August, his clever fielding near the wicket, and a capacity to bowl slows of which he might have made more use, Longrigg will be watched very carefully at Cambridge."

In the event, Longrigg's first year at Cambridge was a disappointment: he made 77 in the Freshman's trial match and then played in five first-class matches for the university cricket team, but without success, and did not win a blue. Back in the Somerset side for much of the second half of the season, though, he again did well, improving his highest score first with 62 against Derbyshire and then with an unbeaten 81 against Warwickshire.

After his poor start in 1926, it took Longrigg a while in 1927 to break into the Cambridge side and with a top score of only 74 and a batting average of 27, he possibly benefited from the illness of Duleepsinhji and injury to Maurice Turnbull in winning a blue. In the University Match, though, he justified his place with a second innings 57 that gave Cambridge the initiative and led to their victory over Oxford. Wisden said that Longrigg displayed "much skill". By contrast, Longrigg's form for Somerset later in the 1927 was unimpressive, and he did not pass 50 in any innings.

In 1928, Longrigg's place in Cambridge's best side seemed to be assured. Mostly he opened the innings and against Sussex early in the season hit an unbeaten 84, his highest score to that point. He achieved little in the University Match, but later in the season with Somerset he improved his highest score again, making 95 against Hampshire after five wickets had fallen 90 on a wet wicket at Weston-super-Mare. In all cricket in 1928, he made 800 runs with an average of 28.57.

== Full-time cricketer ==
The 1929 and 1930 seasons were the only two where Longrigg was able to play fairly continuous county cricket until he became Somerset captain towards the end of the 1930s. In 1929 he played 25 matches, all but one of them for Somerset, and made 1,123 runs at an average of 24.41. Mostly he batted in the middle order, but it was as an opener that he made the first century of his career, 124 against Warwickshire at Taunton. Wisden noted that his average was lower than in the previous season and that "his batting was marked by stubborn defence".

1930 was Longrigg's best season as a batsman. He scored 1,567 runs at an average of 30.72 and hit four centuries. These included a double century, the only one of his career: he made 205 against Leicestershire at Taunton, again as an opening batsman. The double century contributed to Somerset's first victory of the season after a depressing start that had brought 10 defeats in 14 games.

== Irregular cricketer ==
After 1930, Longrigg's career as a solicitor in Bath in the family business increasingly took him away from cricket. In the 1931, 1932 and 1933 seasons he played 12 matches in each season; that tailed off until in 1936 he played only four times. He played more often in home matches than away, and seemed to be available most often in the cricket festival at Bath, where he made at least one appearance every season except 1936.

There were glimpses of what the county side might have been missing. Against Yorkshire at Taunton in 1931, he scored exactly 100 out of a total of 177, which merely delayed the inevitable Yorkshire victory by 10 wickets. Two years later, there was 124 against Surrey at Bath, made this time out of a total of 215 and a second century in the same 1933 season against Middlesex at Weston-super-Mare when he shared a second wicket partnership of 184 with Box Case. But these high spots became less frequent as his involvement declined.

== Somerset captain ==
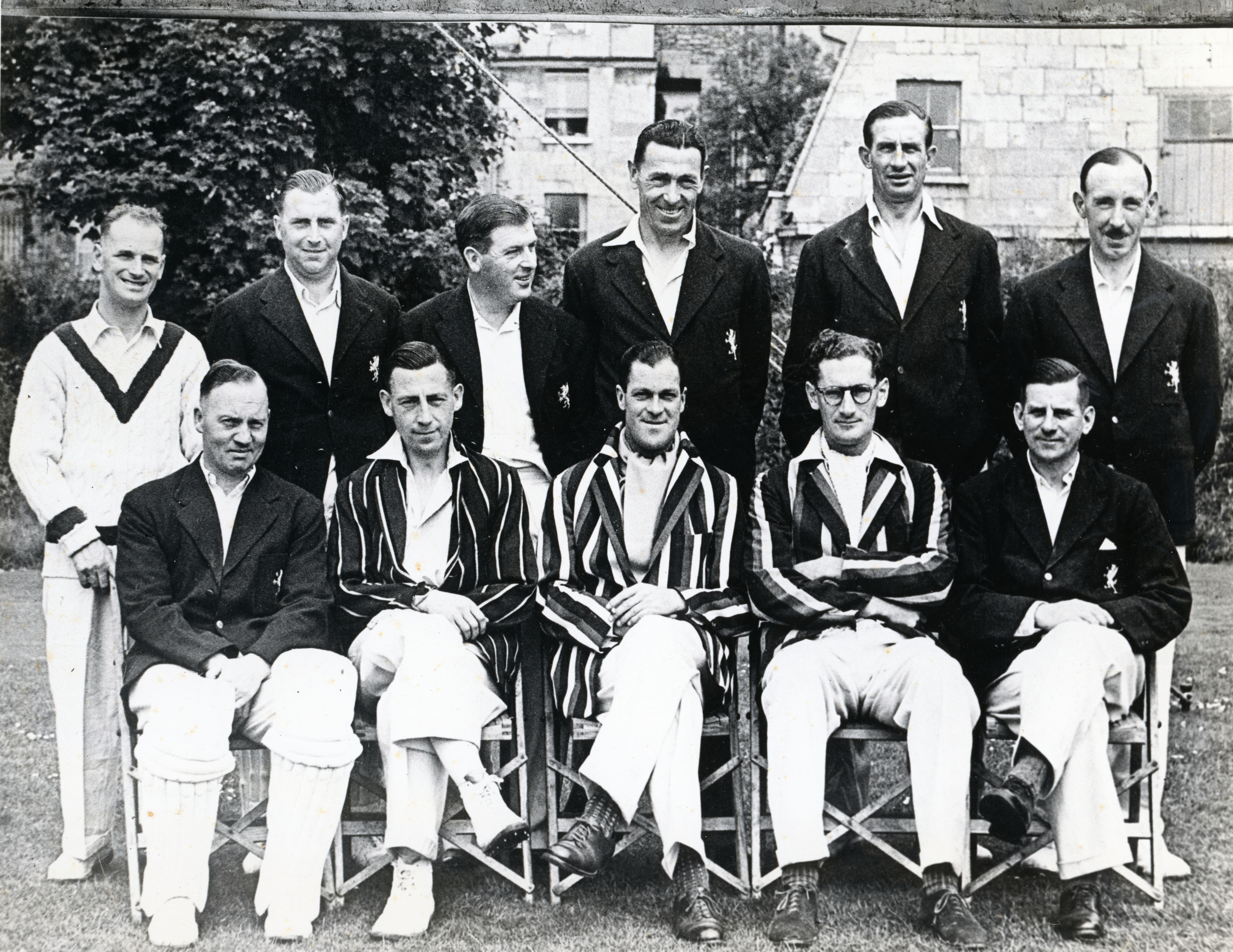
Bunty Longrigg - Front row, centre

In 1937, Longrigg played for Somerset more often, turning out in 11 matches and captaining the side on occasion in the absence of the regular captain, his fellow Bath solicitor Reggie Ingle. At the end of the season, amid some disgruntlement about the side's lack of drive under the amiable Ingle, Longrigg was appointed captain for the 1938 season. The move, Wisden reported in 1939, was a success: Somerset won 10 Championship matches for the first time ever and rose six places up the table to finish seventh. It wrote: "Better team-work played an important part in Somerset's achievements, and in this connection they owed much to E. F. Longrigg... if he did not altogether fulfil expectations as a batsman, he certainly left no doubts concerning his qualifications for leadership. Those who closely followed the county's fortunes were impressed by his tact and judgment as well as keenness which often manifested itself." The personal highlight of the season was an unbeaten 187 against Gloucestershire at Bristol, and he added an unbroken 143 in 90 minutes for the eighth wicket with John Barnwell that was the Somerset record for the wicket until beaten by 172 by Viv Richards and Ian Botham in 1983.

The 1939 season was more difficult, and Somerset fell back to fourteenth in the Championship. Longrigg's best innings of the season was only 82, against Oxford University, when he had to bat with a runner because of a strain.

After the Second World War, Longrigg returned for one final season as Somerset captain and led the side to its best placing in the Championship since 1892. The team finished fourth with a record 12 victories, and Wisden again cited teamwork as an ingredient in the side's success. At the age of 40, Longrigg's was not a great contribution in terms of runs, though he managed four 50s in the season. At the end of the season he stepped down from the captaincy. He made only two further appearances in first-class cricket, both in the 1947 season.

== Later life ==
Longrigg was an important figure in the administration of Somerset cricket for much of the rest of his life, acting as both county chairman and president. He was involved in some of the fractiousness that surrounded the departure of the professional Harold Stephenson as captain and his replacement by the unpaid Colin Atkinson, and was forced to resign as chairman after a vote of no confidence at a special meeting amid reports of player rebellion.

Sporting positions
Preceded by Reggie Ingle	Somerset County Cricket Captain; 1938–1946	Succeeded by Jack Meyer
