= Jack White (cricketer, born 1891) =

English cricketer (1891–1961)

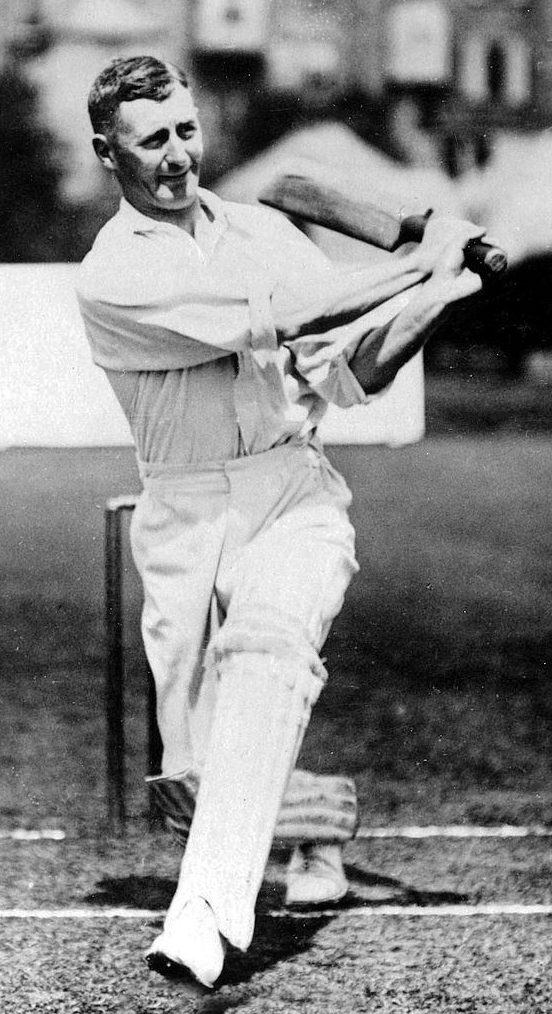

Personal information
- Full name: John Cornish White
- Born: 19 February 1891; Holford, Somerset, England
- Died: 2 May 1961 (aged 70); Combe Florey, Somerset, England
- Nickname: Farmer
- Batting: Right-handed
- Bowling: Slow left-arm orthodox
- Role: Bowling all-rounder

International information
- National side: England
- Test debut (cap 202): 2 July 1921 v Australia
- Last Test: 21 February 1931 v South Africa

Domestic team information
- Years: Team
- 1909–1937: Somerset

Career statistics
Competition	Test	First-class
Matches	15	472
Runs scored	239	12202
Batting average	18.38	18.40
100s/50s	0/0	6/41
Top score	29	192
Balls bowled	4801	129439
Wickets	49	2355
Bowling average	32.26	18.58
5 wickets in innings	3	193
10 wickets in match	1	58
Best bowling	8/126	10/76
Catches/stumpings	6/0	428/0
- Source: Cricinfo, 28 August 2009

John Cornish White, known as "Farmer" or "Jack", (19 February 1891 – 2 May 1961) was an English cricketer who played for Somerset and England. White was named Wisden Cricketer of the Year in 1929. He played in 15 Test matches, and captained England in four of them.

== Domestic career ==
A slow left-arm bowler who used accuracy and variation of pace rather than spin to take wickets, he was a regular player for Somerset from 1913 to 1937, taking 100 wickets a season 14 times. In 1929 and 1930 he also scored more than 1,000 runs, completing the "cricketer's double". Among his county records, he took 16 Worcestershire wickets for 83 runs in the match at Bath in 1919. He also took all 10 Worcestershire wickets in an innings for 76 runs in 1921 at Worcester. His total number of wickets for Somerset, 2,165, is still the county record, as is his number of catches, 393. His career total of 2,355 wickets puts him 16th on the all-time list of wicket-takers. He was captain of Somerset from 1927 to 1931.

His Somerset team-mate R. C. Robertson-Glasgow wrote of White's bowling: "besides the length and direction and the variety of flight, he made the ball 'do a little' each way on the truest pitch without any advertisement from his fingers; and he made the ball bounce high even on a wet slow surface, often hitting the splice or near it with the threat of a catch to himself following up, or to silly-point".

== Test career ==
White was first picked for England in the difficult 1921 series against the Australians and was not then selected again for seven years. For the tour of Australia in 1928–29, he was vice-captain to Percy Chapman and the main bowler in a series that turned into a successful war of attrition. At Melbourne, he bowled 113 overs and five balls, and at Adelaide he surpassed that, bowling 124 overs and five balls and taking 13 wickets in the match for 256 runs, as England won by just 12 runs. In the final Test of the series, he stood in as captain for the injured Chapman, but lost the Test and so ended England's then-record-equalling run of seven consecutive Test victories.

White captained England again in the series against South Africa in 1929: he won once and drew twice. Further Tests followed against Australia in 1930 and in 1930–31 in South Africa, again as vice-captain to Chapman.

White was a Test selector in 1929 and 1930 and was president of the Somerset club at the time of his death.

Sporting positions
Preceded by Percy Chapman	English national cricket captain 1929	Succeeded by Harold Gilligan and Honourable Freddie Calthorpe^{1}
Preceded by John Daniell	Somerset County Cricket Captain; 1927–1931	Succeeded by Reggie Ingle
