= Somerset County Cricket Club in 1885 =

Events of the 1885 cricket season

Somerset County Cricket Club
1885 season
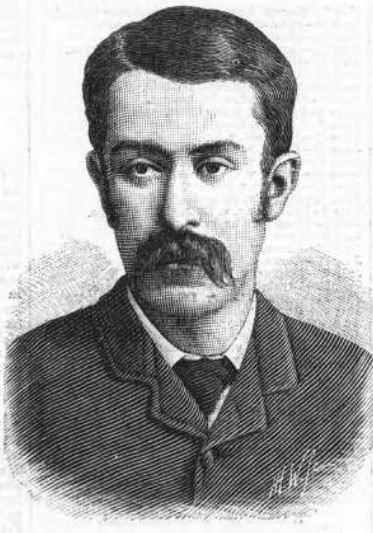
Ted Sainsbury, captain

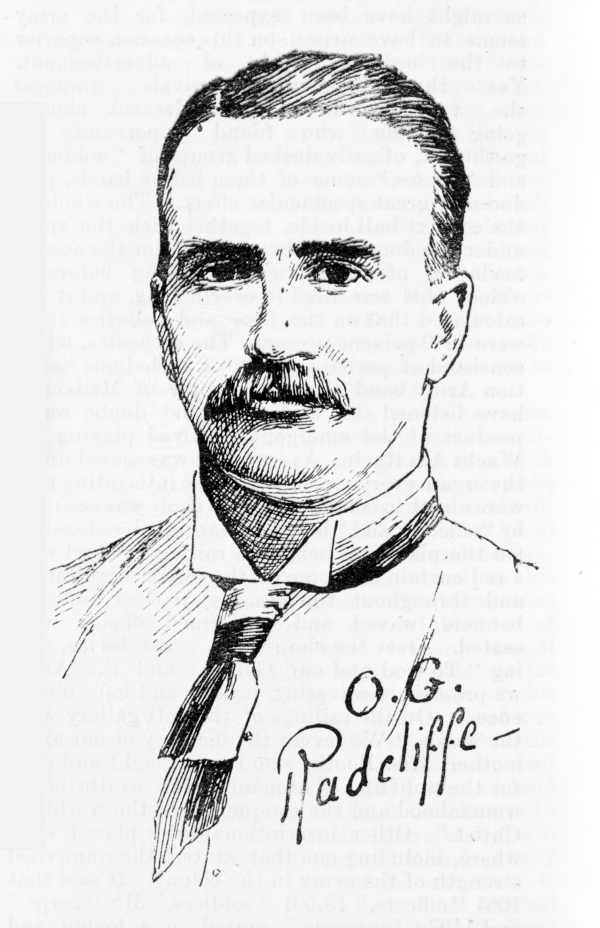
Octavius Radcliffe
- Captain: Ted Sainsbury
- Most runs: Octavius Radcliffe (323)
- Most wickets: Edward Bastard (25)
- Most catches: Charles Winter (6)
- Most wicket-keeping dismissals: George Lillington, Fred Welman (2)

The 1885 season was an annus horribilis for Somerset County Cricket Club. Captained by Ted Sainsbury, who had taken over from Stephen Newton, captain for the previous three seasons, they played six first-class cricket matches. Somerset's only win of the season came in their first match; all the other were lost. Two of the losses, those away against Gloucestershire and Surrey, number among the county's ten heaviest defeats. Somerset were unable to field a full team for their fourth match, which coupled with their poor results and lack of fixtures resulted in the club being stripped of its first-class status at the end of the season.

At an emergency meeting held in Taunton a new club secretary was appointed and wealthy benefactors were sought, but Sainsbury retained the club captaincy. Somerset played second-class cricket for five seasons, until their readmission to the first-class game for the 1891 season.

In their histories of Somerset County Cricket Club, Peter Roebuck and David Foot mostly gloss over the season; Roebuck includes a scorecard, but provides only two paragraphs of prose, while Foot only mentions the loss of first-class cricket.

== Background ==
Somerset had been granted first-class status in advance of the 1882 season. Their maiden season at the top level was described by Wisden as disastrous, but the publication qualified this statement with mild optimism for 1883. The county failed to live up to this optimism, and although there were a few wins, performances on the whole were poor. Twice between 1882 and 1884 Somerset's opponents scored over 500 runs in an innings against them, and against Lancashire in 1884 they fielded only ten players. Stephen Newton, who had captained the side since 1882, left the club at the end of the 1884 season, and thereafter played all his cricket in London.

== Squad ==
In their six first-class matches in 1885, Somerset fielded 26 different players. Only two appeared in all six matches: the captain Edward Sainsbury, and Charles Winter. (Note: Statistics collated from the national batting averages, and for those players who appeared for more than one side, their individual record for that season: Octavius Radcliffe, Fred Welman, Edward Bastard, and George Mirehouse.) James Lillywhite's Cricketers' Annual suggested in 1883 that "professionals not being indigenous to the area [Somerset] it is feared that their advance is only temporary". This prediction was particularly accurate during 1885: only Albert Clapp was a professional. Ten of Somerset's players that year only appeared once during the season, and of those, all but George Mirehouse, Crescens Robinson, and Francis Terry, made fewer than five career first-class appearances.

The following players made at least one appearance for Somerset in first-class cricket in 1885. Age given is at the start of Somerset's first match of the season (16 July 1885).

Key

- † denotes that the player appeared as a wicket-keeper for Somerset in 1885
- Apps denotes the number of appearances made by the player for Somerset in 1885
- Ref denotes the reference for the player details

Name	Birth date	Batting style	Bowling style	Apps	Ref
Edward Bastard	28 February 1862 (aged 23)	Left-handed	Slow left-arm orthodox	4	
John Challen	26 March 1863 (aged 22)	Right-handed	Right-arm fast-medium	5	
Albert Clapp	3 May 1867 (aged 18)	Right-handed	Right-arm medium	3	
Thomas Crump	5 July 1845 (aged 40)	Right-handed	Underarm	1	
Egerton Hall	25 April 1861 (aged 24)	Unknown	Unknown	2	
Henry Hall	24 December 1857 (aged 27)	Unknown	Unknown	1	
Herbie Hewett	25 May 1864 (aged 21)	Left-handed	Unknown-arm medium	4	
Charles Hulls	18 March 1861 (aged 24)	Right-handed	Right-arm medium	1	
George Lillington †	31 October 1843 (aged 41)	Unknown	–	1	
Edward Marsh	7 May 1865 (aged 20)	Right-handed	–	2	
George Mirehouse	11 May 1863 (aged 22)	Right-handed	Right-arm medium-fast	1	
Ernest Murdock †	14 November 1864 (aged 20)	Right-handed	–	2	
Edward Page	6 August 1864 (aged 20)	Unknown	Unknown	1	
James Parfitt	23 December 1857 (aged 27)	Right-handed	Right-arm fast-medium	2	
George Peake	6 March 1846 (aged 39)	Unknown	–	1	
Octavius Radcliffe	20 October 1859 (aged 25)	Right-handed	Right-arm off break	5	
Farrant Reed	10 September 1865 (aged 19)	Right-handed	Unknown	3	
Crescens Robinson	21 May 1864 (aged 21)	Right-handed	Unknown	1	
Bill Roe	21 March 1861 (aged 24)	Right-handed	Right-arm off break / medium	3	
Edward Sainsbury (captain)	5 July 1851 (aged 34)	Right-handed	Underarm unknown-hand slow	6	
Frederick Smith	10 May 1854 (aged 31)	Right-handed	Right-arm fast	2	
Edward Spurway	4 April 1863 (aged 22)	Right-handed	–	1	
Francis Terry	26 October 1860 (aged 24)	Right-handed	Right-arm medium	1	
John Trask	27 October 1861 (aged 23)	Right-handed	Right-arm medium	2	
Fred Welman †	19 February 1849 (aged 36)	Right-handed	–	3	
Charles Winter	9 October 1866 (aged 18)	Right-handed	Right-arm fast	6	

== County cricket ==
During 1885 Somerset suffered badly from their lack of a strong bowling attack. Playing six matches, there were a total of 120 wickets on offer, but Somerset's bowlers took only 67. Edward Bastard, a slow left-arm orthodox bowler, was the county's leading wicket-taker, claiming 25 wickets during his four appearances, at an average of 15.32. (Note: Statistics collated from the national bowling averages, and for those players who appeared for more than one side, their individual record for that season: Octavius Radcliffe, Fred Welman, Edward Bastard, and George Mirehouse.) His bowling average was not far below that of George Lohmann, who finished the season as the country's leading wicket taker, with 142 wickets from his 24 matches. Unfortunately for Somerset, Bastard was only able to play in four of the county's six matches, and of the other bowlers, the best bowling average was the 25.85 managed by Bill Roe, who took only seven wickets. Charles Winter, who took the next highest total of wickets, only managed to claim 15 in his 6 appearances. Batting was the strongest aspect of Somerset's play, but the club lacked the strength-in-depth of other county teams. Herbie Hewett, playing his second season of first-class cricket, finished with the highest batting average for the county with 35.28, a respectable average which exceeded a number of England Test batsmen that season. Only four Somerset batsman passed 50 runs in an innings – Hewett, Octavius Radcliffe, Bill Roe, and Charles Winter – and only Radcliffe advanced to reach a century during the season.

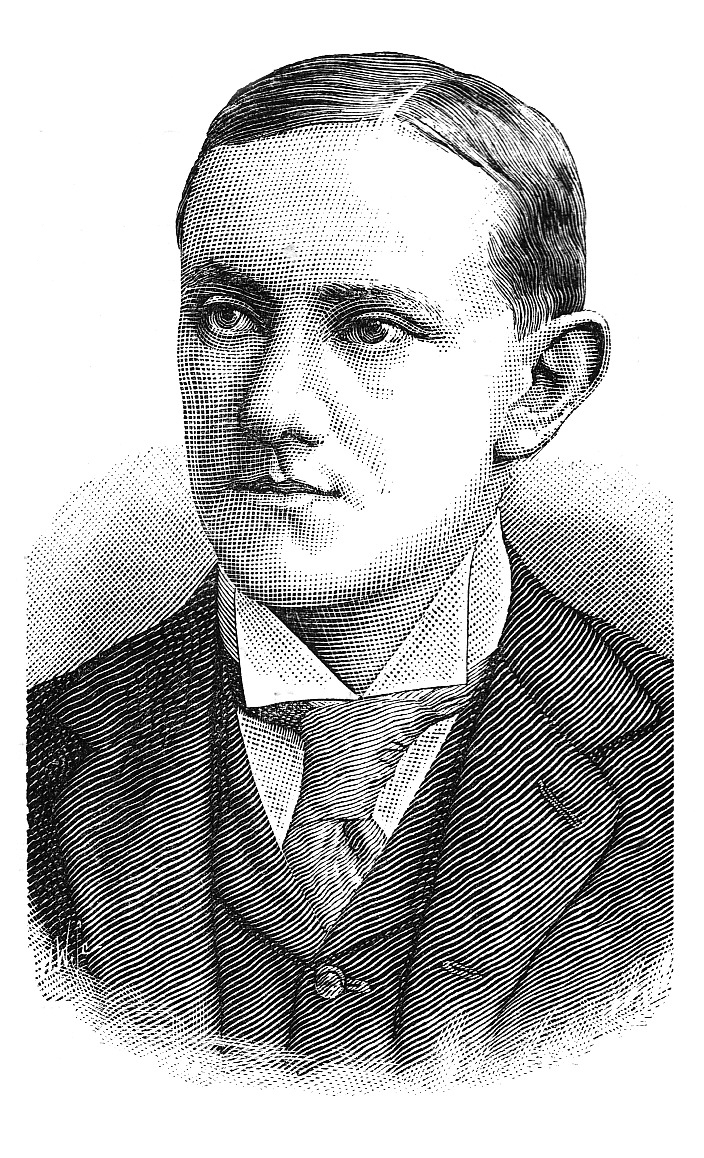
Herbie Hewett led Somerset's batting averages in 1885, with 35.28.

Somerset's first match of 1885 commenced on 16 July 1885, over two months after Nottinghamshire faced Sussex and Surrey travelled to Hampshire to open the first-class county cricket season in England. Somerset began their season at home against Hampshire, and after losing the toss were asked to field. Somerset's bowlers restricted the visitors to 175 runs in the first innings, during which Bastard took a career-best eight wickets in the innings, conceding 54 runs (eight for 54) off his 38 four-ball overs. In reply, Somerset fell short of equalling their opponents and were bowled out for 153, Radcliffe top-scoring with 51 runs. Bastard collected another three wickets in the second innings, granting him one of two career ten-wicket hauls, and Winter took four as Somerset bowled Hampshire out for 111, leaving themselves needing 134 to win. None of Somerset's top four batsmen reached 20 runs, but an unbeaten 50 from Hewett, accompanied by 32 from the number seven, Farrant Reed, helped Somerset achieve a five-wicket victory.

For their next match Somerset travelled to Moreton-in-Marsh, where they faced Gloucestershire. Bastard did not take part in the match, and it fell to Winter to bowl the majority of the overs in his absence. Along with his fellow opener, James Parfitt, Winter claimed three wickets, but both openers conceded over 100 runs for their wickets. Sainsbury tried eight different bowlers in an effort to take wickets, and Gloucestershire were eventually bowled out for 448 after 190 overs. In reply, Somerset conceded their first three wickets for 18 runs, before a brief revival took them to 61 for 3. The last seven wickets then fell for the addition of 39 more runs, and Somerset closed on 100, still trailing their opponents by overs 300 runs. Captain Edward Sainsbury top-scored for Somerset, reaching his highest total of the season, 40, and only two other batsmen reached double figures for the county: Parfitt and the professional, Albert Clapp. Five Somerset players fell for ducks. Asked by Gloucestershire to follow on, Somerset batted even more poorly in their second effort, in which Winter's total of 21 was the highest score. A total of 80 meant that they lost the match by an innings and 268 runs, their heaviest defeat in first-class cricket at that point.

The county had just four days to rest and recover from their loss before facing Surrey at The Oval. Bastard was again unavailable for Somerset, and after losing the toss once more, Somerset spent the whole of the first day in the field. Surrey accumulated 564 runs during that day, and reached 635 before Somerset claimed the tenth wicket to close the innings. At that stage, Maurice Read remained at the crease, having scored 186 not out, his highest score in first-class cricket. The Somerset opening bowlers, Winter and Parfitt, had both conceded in excess of 100 runs for the second match in a row. Sainsbury had utilised one less bowler than against Gloucestershire in his search for wickets, and claimed four of the wickets himself, recording a career-best four for 74. Hewett, whom he asked to bowl 30 overs, finished with 11 maiden overs. The 30 overs he bowled in the match accounted for over a quarter of all his bowling in first-class cricket. In reply to Surrey's total, Somerset were bowled out for 83 in their first innings, in which only John Challen and Crescens Robinson reached double figures, scoring 29 and 12 respectively. Clapp is recorded as "absent hurt" in both of Somerset's innings. In the second innings, Somerset were much improved, reaching 251, their highest batting total of the season. Radcliffe scored the county's only century of the season, scoring 101, and he shared a partnership of 129 with Hewett for the fourth wicket. Hewett reached his own highest score of the season, totalling 85. Nevertheless, Somerset's loss was even heavier than that suffered a week earlier, losing by an innings and 301 runs. As of March 2011, both of these back-to-back losses remain among the ten heaviest experienced by the county in first-class cricket.

Somerset had just over a week off before their next match, for which they travelled to the County Ground, Southampton to face Hampshire once more. Possibly due to their losses in the previous two matches, Somerset could only field nine men in the fixture, a situation which Roebuck described as shameful. For the first time that season, Somerset batted first. They scored 117, and a contemporary match report praised the batting of Winter and Radcliffe, who scored 22 and 34 respectively in the first innings. Bastard "did a capital performance in the first innings of Hants, taking eight of the ten wickets at a cost of only 59 runs", according to the same report. Despite his efforts, Hampshire exceeded Somerset's total, opening up a 45-run lead from the first innings. Winter top-scored for Somerset in their second innings, reaching his highest total in first-class cricket, 62, after opening the batting. Scores in the 20s from Radcliffe and Egerton Hall helped take Somerset to 166, but Hampshire reached the total required for victory with a day of the match remaining, winning by eight wickets.

Surrey visited the County Ground, Taunton a few days later for the counties' second meeting of the season. In a repeat of their previous fixtures, Surrey won the toss and chose to bat. Bastard, who had not played in their earlier clash, opened the bowling for Somerset alongside John Challen. Bastard, presumably due to the weakness of the rest of the county's attack, bowled 50 overs, but he could not repeat the successes he had achieved against Hampshire, toiling to take two for 99. All of Somerset's six bowlers in that innings claimed a wicket as Surrey were bowled out for 292. In reply, Radcliffe occupied the crease as the batsmen at the other end came and went, scoring exactly half of Somerset's 164. Roe, Sainsbury and Hewett all reached double figures, but four Somerset batsmen were dismissed for ducks. Requested to follow on, Somerset fared less well in their second innings: Roe reached 43, but no other batsman passed 20, and Somerset were all out for 123, five runs short of forcing Surrey to bat again.

Somerset were the hosts once more for their final match of the season, played with just a single day off after the Surrey match, and that only because the scheduled three-day match was concluded in two days. The home side won the toss and elected to bat first against Gloucestershire, who opened the bowling with W. G. Grace and William Woof. The pair bowled unchanged for 30 overs each, and claimed five wickets apiece as Somerset were dismissed for 105. Only Frederick Smith and Challen reached double figures, scoring 37 and 39. In response, Gloucestershire totalled 242, during which Bastard claimed four wickets, three of them from the tail. Somerset batted admirably in their second innings, with Roe and Hewett both scoring half-centuries (76 and 66 respectively), and they reached 246, six of the wickets falling to Woof, who collected eleven in the match. Gloucestershire achieved victory for the loss of just one wicket in their second innings, subjecting Somerset to their fifth successive loss.

=== Season record ===
Played	Won	Lost	Win%
6	1	5	16.67

=== Match log ===
No.	Date	Opponents	Venue	Result	Ref
1	16–17 July	Hampshire	County Ground, Taunton	Won by 5 wickets	
2	3–5 August	Gloucestershire	Moreton-in-Marsh Cricket Club Ground, Moreton-in-Marsh	Lost by an innings and 268 runs	
3	10–12 August	Surrey	The Oval, London	Lost by an innings and 301 runs	
4	20–21 August	Hampshire	County Ground, Southampton	Lost by 8 wickets	
5	24–25 August	Surrey	County Ground, Taunton	Lost by an innings and 5 runs	
6	27–28 August	Gloucestershire	County Ground, Taunton	Lost by 9 wickets	

=== Batting averages ===
Player	Matches	Innings	Runs	Average	Highest Score	100s	50s
Herbie Hewett	4	8	247	35.28	85	0	3
Octavius Radcliffe	5	10	323	32.30	101	1	2
Bill Roe	3	6	155	25.83	76	0	1
John Challen	5	10	163	16.30	40	0	0
Charles Winter	6	11	142	15.77	62	0	1
Edward Sainsbury	6	12	119	9.91	40	0	0
Qualification: 100 runs. Source: CricketArchive.

=== Bowling averages ===
Player	Matches	Balls	Wickets	Average	BBI	5wi	10wm
Edward Bastard	4	866	25	15.32	8/54	1	1
Bill Roe	3	407	7	25.85	2/37	0	0
Edward Sainsbury	6	255	6	26.33	4/74	0	0
Charles Winter	6	860	15	29.33	4/20	0	0
John Challen	5	441	5	57.20	2/68	0	0
Qualification: 5 wickets. Source: CricketArchive.

== Aftermath ==
Somerset were stripped of their first-class status for three reasons: they had not organised and played enough first-class fixtures during the season, their performances were not what was expected from a first-class county, and they had not succeeded in fielding a full side of eleven players in all their matches. An emergency meeting was held in Taunton during which a new club secretary was appointed, rules were altered, and wealthy benefactors were sought. Despite these widespread changes, Sainsbury retained the club captaincy. Somerset played second-class cricket for five seasons, finishing as "second-class county champions" in 1890, after which they were readmitted to the first-class game.

== Notes and references ==
Notes

== Bibliography ==
- Roebuck, Peter. From Sammy to Jimmy: The Official History of Somerset County Cricket Club (1991 ed.). London: Partridge Press. ISBN 1-85225-085-2.
- Foot, David. Sunshine, Sixes and Cider: The History of Somerset Cricket (1986 ed.). Newton Abbot, Devon: David & Charles. ISBN 0-7153-8890-8.
