= Somerset County Cricket Club in 1884 =

Somerset County Cricket Club
1884 season
- Captain: Stephen Newton
- Most runs: Stephen Newton (218)
- Most wickets: Edward Bastard (24)

In 1884, Somerset County Cricket Club played their third season of first-class cricket. They were captained by Stephen Newton, and played in six matches, winning only one of them.

== Squad ==
The following players made at least one appearance for Somerset in first-class cricket in 1884. Age given is at the start of Somerset's first match of the season (8 May 1884).

Key

- † denotes that the player appeared as a wicket-keeper for Somerset in 1884
- Apps denotes the number of appearances made by the player for Somerset in 1884
- Ref denotes the reference for the player details

Name	Birth date	Batting style	Bowling style	Apps	Ref
Edward Bastard	28 February 1862 (aged 22)	Left-handed	Slow left-arm orthodox	5	
John Challen	26 March 1863 (aged 21)	Right-handed	Right-arm fast-medium	4	
Alfred Evans	14 June 1858 (aged 25)	Right-handed	Right-arm fast-medium	1	
Arnold Fothergill	26 August 1854 (aged 29)	Left-handed	Left-arm medium-fast	1	
Bill Fowler	28 May 1856 (aged 27)	Right-handed	Right-arm fast	2	
Herbert Fox	1 August 1858 (aged 25)	Right-handed	Left-arm (unknown style)	2	
Egerton Hall	25 April 1861 (aged 23)	Unknown	Unknown	1	
Herbie Hewett	25 May 1864 (aged 19)	Left-handed	Unknown-arm medium	2	
William Jewell	1 January 1855 (aged 29)	Unknown	Unknown	1	
Frederick Marks	5 February 1867 (aged 17)	Right-handed	Right-arm fast	1	
George Mirehouse	11 May 1863 (aged 20)	Right-handed	Right-arm medium-fast	3	
Stephen Newton (captain)	21 April 1853 (aged 31)	Right-handed	Unknown	5	
Farrant Reed	10 September 1865 (aged 18)	Right-handed	Unknown	2	
Francis Reed	24 October 1850 (aged 33)	Right-handed	Right-arm medium	4	
Theo Robinson	16 February 1866 (aged 18)	Right-handed	Right-arm medium	2	
Bill Roe	21 March 1861 (aged 23)	Right-handed	Right-arm off break / medium	3	
Edward Sainsbury	5 July 1851 (aged 32)	Right-handed	Underarm unknown-hand slow	5	
Frederick Smith	10 May 1854 (aged 29)	Right-handed	Right-arm fast	1	
Edward Stanley	29 June 1852 (aged 31)	Unknown	–	1	
Francis Terry †	26 October 1860 (aged 23)	Right-handed	Right-arm medium	5	
John Trask	27 October 1861 (aged 22)	Right-handed	Right-arm medium	1	
Fred Welman †	19 February 1849 (aged 35)	Right-handed	–	3	
Edward Western	12 May 1845 (aged 38)	Right-handed	–	1	
Charles Winter	9 October 1866 (aged 17)	Right-handed	Right-arm fast	5	
H E Winter	Unknown	Unknown	Unknown	1	
John Winter	28 July 1851 (aged 32)	Unknown	–	1	

== County cricket ==
=== Season record ===
Played	Won	Lost	Win%
6	1	5	16.67

=== Match log ===
No.	Date	Opponents	Venue	Result	Ref
1	8–9 May	Kent	County Ground, Taunton	Lost by an innings and 27 runs	
2	7–9 August	Hampshire	Antelope Ground, Southampton	Lost by an innings and 169 runs	
3	11–12 August	Lancashire	County Ground, Taunton	Lost by 8 wickets	
4	18–19 August	Hampshire	Lansdown Cricket Club Ground, Bath	Won by an innings and 63 runs	
5	25–27 August	Kent	Higher Common Ground, Royal Tunbridge Wells	Lost by 159 runs	
6	28–29 August	Lancashire	Old Trafford, Manchester	Lost by 10 wickets	

=== Batting averages ===
Player	Matches	Innings	Runs	Average	Highest Score	100s	50s
Bill Roe	3	5	164	32.80	132	1	0
John Challen	4	7	176	25.14	93	0	1
Stephen Newton	5	9	218	24.22	62	0	1
Francis Terry	5	9	209	23.22	51	0	1
Francis Reed	4	8	133	19.00	57*	0	1
William Trask	5	9	118	13.11	45	0	0
Qualification: 100 runs. Source: CricketArchive. (Note: Statistics collated from the national batting averages, and for those players who appeared for more than one side, their individual record for that season: Edward Sainsbury, Arnold Fothergill, Bill Fowler, Fred Welman, Edward Bastard, and George Mirehouse.)

=== Bowling averages ===
Player	Matches	Balls	Wickets	Average	BBI	5wi	10wm
Edward Bastard	5	881	24	14.33	6/33	1	0
Charles Winter	5	640	12	25.08	3/37	0	0
Qualification: 10 wickets. Source: CricketArchive. (Note: Statistics collated from the national bowling averages, and for those players who appeared for more than one side, their individual record for that season: Edward Sainsbury, Arnold Fothergill, Bill Fowler, Fred Welman, Edward Bastard, and George Mirehouse.)

== Notes and references ==
Notes

== Bibliography ==
- Roebuck, Peter. From Sammy to Jimmy: The Official History of Somerset County Cricket Club (1991 ed.). London: Partridge Press. ISBN 1-85225-085-2.
- Foot, David. Sunshine, Sixes and Cider: The History of Somerset Cricket (1986 ed.). Newton Abbot, Devon: David & Charles. ISBN 0-7153-8890-8.
