= Somerset County Cricket Club in 1883 =

Somerset CCC 1883 cricket season

Somerset County Cricket Club
1883 season
- Captain: Stephen Newton
- Most runs: Edward Sainsbury (335)
- Most wickets: Arnold Fothergill (27)

In 1883, Somerset County Cricket Club played their second season of first-class cricket. They were captained by Stephen Newton, and played in seven matches, six against county opposition, and one against the Marylebone Cricket Club (MCC). They won only one of their seven contests, that against Hampshire at Taunton. Of the remaining matches, the one against the MCC was drawn, and the other five were all losses for Somerset.

Although Somerset's matches in 1883 are considered by modern consensus to hold first-class status, at the time they were held by many publications to only be a second-class side. The quality of the team was limited by Somerset's tight finances, which meant they struggled to hire good professional players, and team selection was often based on social status or boasts, rather than demonstrated ability. The team's bowling was particularly criticised, while their batting received faint praise. Against Gloucestershire, Ted Sainsbury scored the first century for Somerset in first-class cricket, and Francis Terry scored the second in Somerset's last match of the season, against Hampshire.

== Background ==
Somerset County Cricket Club (often referred to in 19th-century news reports as Somersetshire) was formed in 1875, and played irregular county fixtures in the years after that, during which time they struggled to remain financially solvent. Upon their formation, the club had no fixed home ground, and it was declared that they would play "on any ground in the county that may be selected by the committee." However, in 1881, they moved into the newly built Athletic Grounds in Taunton. (Note: Now known as the County Ground.) Although Wisden Cricketers' Almanack, which most modern statistics are based upon, placed Somerset's debut first-class match in 1882, some records do include earlier matches in 1879 and 1881 against Gloucestershire as being of first-class status. Partly due to the lack of availability of some of their best players, Wisden described their inaugural 1882 campaign, during which Somerset lost six of their eight fixtures, as "a disastrous season".

The status of Somerset as a first-class county in 1883 was still ambiguous in the contemporary press; while The Sportsman and Wisden included them amongst the first-class statistics, other publications such as Cricket: A Weekly Record of the Game and The Pall Mall Gazette did not. The season summary provided by The Manchester Guardian included "an expression of surprise that Somerset and Hampshire should be included in the list of first-class counties", while The Daily Telegraph suggested that Somerset needed to improve their performances if they wanted to be considered a first-class side.

== Squad ==
In their seven first-class matches in 1883, Somerset fielded 20 different players. In his history of Somerset cricket, David Foot said that selection during this period "was inclined to be determined with a nod and a wink over drinks". Foot said that it was common for new players to be included based on exaggerated tales of their abilities, rather than any due diligence taking place. Somerset relied heavily upon amateur players, and this often meant that some of their better cricketers were not always available for games due to their commitments outside the sport. Only two players appeared in all seven fixtures: Edward Bastard and Arnold Fothergill, the latter of whom was one of three professionals to play for Somerset in 1883. Somerset's ability to recruit good professionals was limited by two key factors; their finances and local availability. Throughout their early existence, Somerset struggled financially, and professional players cost considerably more than amateurs, the latter of whom were only allowed to claim expenses.

The following players made at least one appearance for Somerset in first-class cricket in 1883. Age given is at the start of Somerset's first match of the season (30 July 1883).

Somerset players in 1883
Name	Birth date	Batting style	Bowling style	Status	Apps	Ref
Joe Ambler (WK)	12 February 1860 (aged 23)	Right-handed	Right-arm fast-medium	Professional	4	
Edward Bastard	28 February 1862 (aged 21)	Left-handed	Slow left-arm orthodox	Amateur	7	
Alfred Evans	14 June 1858 (aged 25)	Right-handed	Right-arm fast-medium	Amateur	3	
Arnold Fothergill	26 August 1854 (aged 28)	Left-handed	Left-arm medium-fast	Professional	7	
Bill Fowler	28 May 1856 (aged 27)	Right-handed	Right-arm fast	Amateur	5	
Herbert Fox	1 August 1858 (aged 24)	Right-handed	—	Amateur	3	
Thomas Gregg	18 November 1859 (aged 23)	Right-handed	Right-arm fast	Amateur	1	
Lyonel Hildyard	5 February 1861 (aged 22)	Right-handed	—	Amateur	6	
George Lillington (WK)	31 October 1843 (aged 39)	Unknown	—	Professional	1	
Stephen Newton (captain)	21 April 1853 (aged 30)	Right-handed	Unknown	Amateur	6	
James Parfitt	23 December 1857 (aged 25)	Right-handed	Right-arm fast-medium	Amateur	4	
Albert Porter	20 January 1864 (aged 19)	Unknown	Unknown	Amateur	2	
Farrant Reed	10 September 1865 (aged 17)	Right-handed	Unknown	Amateur	1	
Bill Roe	21 March 1861 (aged 22)	Right-handed	Right-arm off break / medium	Amateur	6	
Hamilton Ross	26 August 1849 (aged 33)	Right-handed	—	Amateur	4	
Edward Sainsbury	5 July 1851 (aged 32)	Right-handed	Underarm unknown-hand slow	Amateur	6	
Charles Sweet	29 November 1860 (aged 22)	Unknown	–	Amateur	1	
Francis Terry	26 October 1860 (aged 22)	Right-handed	—	Amateur	2	
Fred Welman (WK)	19 February 1849 (aged 34)	Right-handed	–	Amateur	5	
Charles Winter	9 October 1866 (aged 16)	Right-handed	Right-arm fast	Amateur	3	

== County cricket ==
=== Summary ===
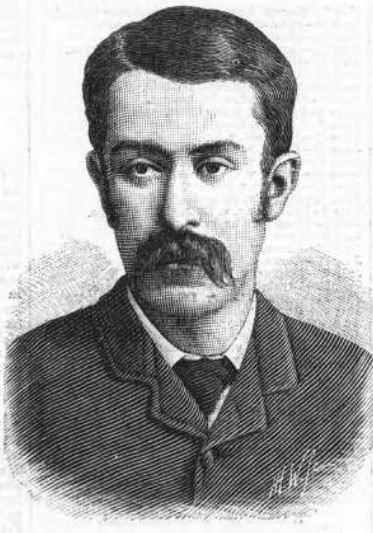
Against Gloucestershire, Ted Sainsbury scored Somerset's first century in first-class cricket.

Somerset began their season against the Marylebone Cricket Club (MCC) at Lord's in London on 30 July. According to Cricket, neither side was at full-strength, and the bowlers available were particularly weak, resulting in a high-scoring draw. Somerset batted first, and other than Ted Sainsbury, whose batting to score 51 runs was described as "marked by great care and judgment" by the Bristol Mercury, they struggled early on, losing five wickets for 130 runs by lunchtime. However, a century partnership between Joe Ambler (who scored 76) and Francis Terry (54) took Somerset to 302. The match was rain interrupted on both days; Somerset bowled the MCC out for 195 in their first innings, including four wickets from Ambler, but were unable to bowl them out again, leaving the MCC on 214 for nine at the end of the match.

In Somerset's first county match of the season, they suffered a heavy loss to Surrey at the Kennington Oval in London. Somerset batted first and scored 84 runs; a report in the Daily Bristol Times and Mirror described Somerset's batting as "unaccountably weak". Surrey responded with 449 runs in their first innings, and then bowled Somerset out for a second time on day two for 152 runs. Somerset lost the match by an innings and 213 runs, a result which remains one of their heaviest defeats. Somerset next faced Hampshire at Day's Ground in Southampton, another side which some contemporary publications considered to be second-class, rather than first-class. The Morning Post noted that Somerset were missing some players for the match, but criticised the team's "feeble resistance" to the Hampshire bowling. Roe was Somerset's top-scorer in the first innings, scoring 45 of the county's total of 102. Hampshire then scored 251, and until Fothergill and Bastard came together at the crease, Somerset looked like they would again lose by an innings. The pair added 74 runs together, and forced Hampshire to bat again. Hampshire reached their target with ease, and beat Somerset by seven wickets.

Somerset then played back-to-back matches against Gloucestershire. The first game, played at Clifton College Close Ground, started on a wet wicket. Both sides' first-innings scores were low; Gloucestershire scored 131, and Somerset 98. In the second innings, Fothergill took five wickets for Somerset, but Gloucestershire amassed 231 runs, giving them a big lead. Somerset fell well short of the winning target, and lost by 114 runs. In the return fixture in Taunton, Gloucestershire batted first and scored 371. In response, Somerset made 179, of which Sainsbury scored 59, James Parfitt 29 and Roe 26. As they were so many runs behind Gloucestershire's total, they were forced to follow-on and bat again. Sainsbury was once again Somerset's highest scorer in their second innings; he made 116, the first century for Somerset in a first-class fixture. Two other Somerset players hit half-centuries; Newton with 63 and Alfred Evans 59. Somerset finished their innings on 343, giving them a 151-run lead. Gloucestershire chased down the winning total in two hours, and won by eight wickets.

Against Surrey at Taunton, Somerset had the better of the first innings. Surrey scored 193, during which Evans took five wickets for Somerset. In reply, Somerset reached 228; Newton scored 38, Sainsbury 37, Joe Ambler 35 and Fred Welman 33. Surrey then reached a similar total in the second innings, scoring 195. In both innings, their top-scorer was Walter Read, who was unbeaten in both innings on 93 and 86. Somerset succumbed to the bowling of Ted Barratt, and only made 85 runs in their second innings, losing by 75 runs. Somerset's final fixture of the season was at Taunton against Hampshire. Somerset batted first and scored 251, principally due to an aggressive effort from Francis Terry, who scored 121. Newton scored a more patient 41, and Fothergill got 23. Fothergill was also a crucial part of Somerset's bowling; he took six wickets in the first innings to help restrict Hampshire to 126, and then a further four when Hampshire followed-on. Hampshire scored 222 in their second-innings to lead by 97 runs. Somerset lost five wickets as they chased down the total; Evans scored 27 and Terry 20, and Somerset won their only game of the season.

=== Season record ===
Played	Won	Lost	Drawn	Win%
7	1	5	1	14.29

=== Match log and statistics ===
County matches
No.	Date	Opponents	Venue	Result
1	2–3 August	Surrey	Kennington Oval, London	Lost by an innings and 213 runs
2	6–7 August	Hampshire	Day's Ground, Southampton	Lost by 7 wickets
3	9–11 August	Gloucestershire	Clifton College Close Ground, Bristol	Lost by 114 runs
4	13–15 August	Gloucestershire	County Ground, Taunton	Lost by 8 wickets
5	16–17 August	Surrey	County Ground, Taunton	Lost by 75 runs
6	28–29 August	Hampshire	County Ground, Taunton	Won by 5 wickets

Other matches
No.	Date	Opponents	Venue	Result
1	30–31 July	Marylebone Cricket Club	Lord's, London	Drawn

Batting averages
Player	Matches	Innings	Runs	Average	Highest Score	100s	50s
Francis Terry	2	3	195	65.00	121	1	1
Edward Sainsbury	6	11	335	30.45	116	1	2
Arnold Fothergill	7	13	214	19.45	45*	0	0
Bill Roe	6	10	189	18.90	45	0	0
Stephen Newton	6	12	209	17.41	63	0	1
Lyonel Hildyard	6	12	151	16.77	34	0	0
Qualification: 150 runs. Source: CricketArchive. (Note: Statistics collated from the national batting averages, and for those players who appeared for more than one side, their individual record for that season: Edward Sainsbury, Arnold Fothergill and Bill Roe.)

Bowling averages
Player	Matches	Balls	Wickets	Average	BBI	5wi	10wm
Charles Winter	3	340	10	13.80	3/12	0	0
Arnold Fothergill	7	1,040	27	16.85	6/43	2	1
Alfred Evans	3	522	15	20.40	5/78	1	0
Edward Bastard	7	1,238	17	30.58	4/47	0	0
Qualification: 10 wickets. Source: CricketArchive. (Note: Statistics collated from the national bowling averages, and for those players who appeared for more than one side, their individual record for that season: Arnold Fothergill and Edward Bastard.)

== Aftermath ==
In their summary of the season, the Taunton Courier highlighted Somerset's bowling as "the weak point in the county team", while generally praising the batting averages. Similar analysis was provided by the Bath Chronicle, which said: "The scoring has been fairly good, but ... the less said about the bowling the better." Across their four first-class seasons from 1882 to 1885, Somerset only achieved four victories; one each season against Hampshire. As a result, Somerset lost their first-class status for 1886.

== Notes and references ==
Notes

== Bibliography ==
- Foot, David (1986). Sunshine, Sixes and Cider: The History of Somerset Cricket. Newton Abbot, Devon: David & Charles. ISBN 0-7153-8890-8.
- Hill, Stephen (2016). Somerset Cricketers 1882–1914. Wellington, Somerset: Halsgrove. ISBN 978-0-85704-291-0.
- Roebuck, Peter (1991). From Sammy to Jimmy: The Official History of Somerset County Cricket Club. London: Partridge Press. ISBN 1-85225-085-2.
