= Ted Sainsbury =

English cricketer (1851–1930)

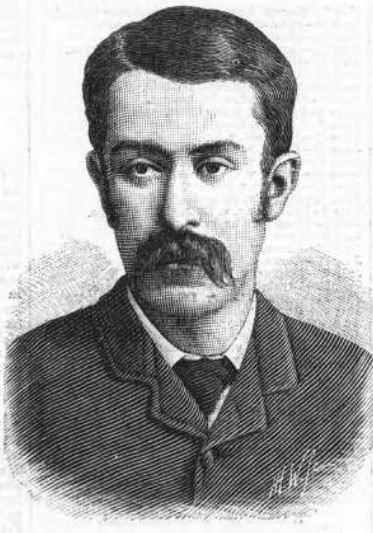
- 1887 portrait of Sainsbury

Personal information
- Full name: Edward Sainsbury
- Born: 5 July 1851; Bath, Somerset, England
- Died: 28 October 1930 (aged 79); Weston-super-Mare, Somerset, England
- Batting: Right-handed
- Bowling: Underarm, slow
- Role: Batsman

Domestic team information
- Years: Team
- 1877–1888: Somerset
- 1882–1894: Marylebone Cricket Club
- 1891–1892: Gloucestershire
- First-class debut: 8 June 1882; Somerset v Lancashire
- Last First-class: 27 July 1892 Gloucestershire v Yorkshire

Career statistics
Competition	First-class
Matches	46
Runs scored	1,213
Batting average	14.97
100s/50s	1/3
Top score	116
Balls bowled	900
Wickets	25
Bowling average	25.76
5 wickets in innings	0
10 wickets in match	0
Best bowling	4/74
Catches/stumpings	20/–
- Source: CricketArchive, 19 July 2008

Edward Sainsbury (5 July 1851 – 28 October 1930) was an English cricketer who represented, and captained, Somerset County Cricket Club in the late 19th century. During a 10-year first-class cricket career, he also represented Gloucestershire and the Marylebone Cricket Club (MCC).

Most commonly employed as a right-handed opening batsman, Sainsbury was one of Somerset's most talented batsman during their formative years. His slow underarm bowling was effective in second-class cricket, but in an era when overarm bowling was becoming the standard, he was used sparingly in the first-class game. During his time at Somerset, the county gained first-class status. After being led for three seasons by Sainsbury's Lansdown team-mate Stephen Newton, Sainsbury was given the Somerset captaincy for the 1885 season. A combination of poor results and not being able to raise a full eleven during that season led to the county's removal from the first-class game, although Sainsbury remained as captain until 1888. By the time Somerset had improved sufficiently to return to first-class cricket in 1891, Sainsbury had moved to neighbouring county Gloucestershire, where he saw out his county cricket career.

== Early life ==
Sainsbury was born on 5 July 1851 in Bath, Somerset, the youngest son of John Popham Sainsbury. He attended Sherborne School, an independent school in north-west Dorset. Playing for the school's cricket eleven he acquired a reputation for his slow underarm bowling, which could deceive even the most wary opponent into conceding his wicket. He was considered an even better batsman, and often opened the innings for the school.

== Club and second-class county cricket ==
Sainsbury played alongside his older brother, Francis, for Lansdown Cricket Club from at least 1865. His first recorded appearance for a representative county side was in August 1877, when he played for Somerset, against their Dorset neighbours. He opened the batting for the Somerset team alongside Hamilton Ross. Both had been scoring plenty of runs for Lansdown in club cricket, and Sainsbury made 32, a respectable score in the match, which Somerset won by an innings. Only Edward Lloyd scored more, posting an unbeaten 110, one of the earliest centuries scored for a Somerset county side. Sainsbury also opened the bowling during the match, but he claimed only one wicket over the two innings and bowled just 13 of the 104 overs. A few days later he appeared again for the county side, against Clifton, who had the Australian Test cricketer, Billy Midwinter, in their team. Sainsbury scored 96 not out, including a "resolute" partnership with Stephen Newton, before rain forced the game to be drawn. Subsequently, he scored 7 and 81 against the Wiltshire Wanderers, and took ten wickets in the match, including six in the first innings. In two further appearances for Somerset in 1877, Sainsbury did not surpass the score he reached against Dorset but claimed two further wickets, both against the Gentlemen of Wiltshire. Sainsbury finished the season top of Somerset's batting averages, having scored 230 runs at an average of 46.00.

Sainsbury added himself to the list of early Somerset centurions during 1878, hitting 105 while batting at number 6 against Hertfordshire. In doing so, he batted for over four hours, and shared an eighth wicket partnership of 114 with Francis Reed, out of a Somerset total of 249. His bowling was also on form during the match, and after collecting two wickets in the first innings, he claimed five in the second. The Somerset side during the late 1870s reflected the strength of the Lansdown club: of the eleven players that represented Somerset in their match against the Marylebone Cricket Club in early August 1878, five of them also represented Lansdown when the London club travelled down to Bath. In between these two matches against the MCC, Sainsbury scored a half-century for Somerset during their match against Devon. Toward the end of August, Sainsbury's bowling once again came to the fore, as he claimed five wickets in the first innings against Worcestershire to help defend Somerset's lead and propel them to an innings victory. He once again led the Somerset batting averages, scoring 211 runs at an average of 35.16, while his 13 wickets were the second most in the team, at an average of 9.69.

Sainsbury batting scores dipped in county cricket during 1879; in nine appearances for Somerset during the year, his highest score was 39. He performed better with the ball, twice taking four wickets during an innings, against both Bedfordshire and the MCC. The following county season began more positively for Sainsbury, as he collected nine wickets in the match against Sussex at Lansdown's ground in Bath, claiming six wickets for 54 runs in the second innings of the game. He claimed another eight wickets when Somerset travelled to Leicestershire, during which Sainsbury and Arnold Fothergill took five wickets each in Leicestershire's first innings, restricting the home side to 51 runs. Somerset won the low-scoring contest by 85 runs, Sainsbury having scored a valuable 28 during his side's first innings. Somerset's visit to Sussex saw Sainsbury continue his success against the county, this time with the bat rather than the ball. Sussex built on their 63 run first innings lead with a second innings total of 183, leaving Somerset the task of scoring 247 runs to win the match. Sainsbury scored his second century for Somerset, remaining 101 not out when Somerset reached the winning total. He was assisted by a half-century from Stephen Newton, and scores in the twenties by Bill Fowler and Frederick Smith. Later that month, his batting was once again instrumental in setting up a Somerset victory, when he top-scored with 87 as Somerset beat the MCC by an innings.

During the 1881 season, Sainsbury was joined at Somerset by his older brother Francis, who appeared four times for the county. Sainsbury performed consistently with the bat during the season, regularly scoring between 20 and 40 runs in an innings. His highest score was made against Gloucestershire, when he reached his only half-century of the season, scoring 56 while batting at number seven. Sainsbury bowled less frequently during 1881, and rarely opened the bowling for Somerset. His best bowling performance of the season for his county came against Hampshire, when – having not bowled in the first innings – he claimed four wickets as Hampshire followed on. On this occasion he was the fifth bowler used by Somerset, but he bowled the highest number of overs.

== First-class cricket ==
=== Somerset's leading batsman ===
Towards the end of the 1870s, journalists had suggested that Somerset chose their players "upon breeding rather than skill". The best players in the county, many of whom were not wealthy men, were unable to afford to play for Somerset. In turn, the cricket club could not afford to pay professionals to play for them, and were regarded as an occasional amateur outfit by many, rather than a side that could truly represent the strength of cricket within the county. The arrival of two professional players, and the acquisition of a permanent home ground in Taunton helped strengthen the club so that in 1882 they were admitted as a first-class county. Bill Roe, at the time a schoolboy, rated Sainsbury as "by far the best batsman in the side" during their pre-first-class years. On 8 June 1882, Somerset played their first match to be universally considered first-class, against Lancashire. After losing the toss and fielding for over 150 overs as Lancashire scored 237, Somerset responded with a first innings total of 29 – their second lowest total ever in first-class cricket. Sainsbury and his fellow opening batsman, Fowler, top-scored for Somerset with 9 runs each, and both were once again the highest scorers in the second innings, when Fowler scored 18 and Sainsbury 17 runs out of a total of 51. Somerset were beaten by an innings and 157 runs, and batted for less than 70 overs. The county suffered further heavy defeats in their next two matches, losing to Gloucestershire and Hampshire, with no Somerset batsman reaching a half-century in either match. Sainsbury reached his first half-century in first-class cricket when Somerset hosted Hampshire at the County Ground – teammates Robert Ramsay and Stephen Newton also passed 50 for the county in this match, which helped Somerset to their maiden first-class victory. Sainsbury claimed a wicket in each innings of the match, during which he bowled just eight overs: in the first innings he bowled one over, conceding one run and claiming one wicket. In first-class matches in 1882, Sainsbury scored 255 runs at an average of 17.00, exceeding 50 on only one occasion. He bowled infrequently, claiming four wickets at an average in excess of 40.

Sainsbury reached a half-century on his first appearance for Somerset in first-class cricket in 1883, scoring 51 runs against the MCC. He did not reach 50 in his next three appearances for the county, but against Gloucestershire he top-scored for his side in their first innings with 59, and then when Somerset were forced to follow on, he scored his only century in first-class cricket, amassing 116 runs before he became one of W. G. Grace's eleven victims in the match. Sainsbury played in seven matches during 1883, and achieved his highest batting average in a season, his century and two fifties boosting him to 27.92. Although he played another 31 first-class matches during his career, he did not score more than 40 runs in an innings after 1883. He also recorded his best bowling average in 1883, claiming his nine first-class wickets at 18.55. In early June 1884, Sainsbury played for a side representing the South of England, scoring 3 and 29 during a 66-run victory for the South. Playing for Lansdown against the touring Gentlemen of Philadelphia the following month, he scored the only century of the match, reaching 108, and sharing a first wicket partnership of 149 with E. M. Grace. He batted poorly for Somerset during 1884, failing to reach double figures in most of his innings, and hitting a top score of 30 for the county. His season average was dramatically lower than the previous season, dropping below 10.

=== Troubled captaincy ===
Following the departure of Somerset captain Stephen Newton, who played all his first-class cricket in London from the 1885 season onwards, Sainsbury was given the club captaincy. Somerset's first county match of the season took place in mid-July, almost two months after four of the counties had contested matches. The match, played against Hampshire, showed little sign of the troubles that were to come. Sainsbury scored 0 and 13 opening the batting for his side, but the bowling of Edward Bastard, who claimed eight wickets in the first innings and three in the second, helped Somerset to a five-wicket victory. The county's next match, played two weeks later against Gloucestershire, was their heaviest defeat when losing by an innings to that point. Gloucestershire won the toss and elected to bat, totalling 448 in 190 overs; Somerset bowlers James Parfitt and Charles Winter both conceding over 100 runs. In reply, five of the Somerset batsman were out for ducks; Sainsbury, Parfitt and Albert Clapp were the only ones to reach double figures. Sainsbury top-scored with 40 runs, but a team total of 100 meant that Gloucestershire forced his side to follow-on. The second innings progressed even more poorly for Somerset. Sainsbury was one of eight batsmen who failed to reach double figures, and the team was dismissed for 80 runs, resulting in an innings and 268 run loss.

Matches were played more frequently in August, and Sainsbury and his Somerset team had just four days to recover from their defeat before travelling to The Oval to face Surrey. Sainsbury once again lost the toss and was forced to field. Surrey batted for 222.1 overs as they accumulated 635 runs. Opening bowlers Parfitt and Winter once again conceded a century of runs apiece, and four of Somerset's other bowlers conceded over 50 runs each. In total, Sainsbury tried seven different bowlers during the innings to try to get wickets, including Herbie Hewett, who completed his career of 106 matches with just two first-class wickets. Sainsbury himself was the most successful of the bowlers, taking four wickets for 74 runs, his best first-class bowling performance. In reply, Somerset were bowled out for 83 runs, with Clapp recorded as "absent hurt". Following on, Somerset mustered a more respectable total of 251, aided primarily by a century from Octavius Radcliffe and 85 from Hewett. Sainsbury himself added 21 to the score in the second innings after being dismissed for one in the first. The defeat was heavier still than the one suffered a week earlier; Surrey won by an innings and 301 runs.

Morale was low at Somerset, and the county could not raise a full team to face Hampshire at Southampton a week later. They travelled with nine players, among their number Farrant Reed, who played eight first-class matches in his life, Ernest Murdock, who played five, Egerton Hall, three, and Edward Spurway, two. Somerset scored 117 runs in their first innings, of which Sainsbury contributed nine. The bowling of Bastard, who took eight for 59, helped to restrict Hampshire to 162. Despite their low numbers, Somerset reached 166 in their second innings, Sainsbury scoring ten from number five in the batting order. With Bastard unable to replicate his first innings performance, Hampshire reached the winning total of 123 from 60.3 overs. Somerset played Surrey and Gloucestershire in their final two matches of the season and lost both heavily, although they did succeed in avoiding any further record defeats; Surrey won by an innings and five runs, and Gloucestershire by nine wickets. Sainsbury's highest score in his four innings was 14. In the six matches that he played that season, all for Somerset, Sainsbury scored 119 runs at an average of 9.91, a marginal improvement on his previous season.

== Return to second-class cricket ==
Somerset were stripped of their first-class status for three reasons: they had not organised and played enough first-class fixtures during the season, their performances were not what was expected from a first-class county, and they had not succeeded in fielding a full side of eleven players in all their matches. An emergency meeting was held in Taunton, during which a new club secretary was appointed, rules were altered, and wealthy benefactors were sought. Despite these widespread changes, Sainsbury retained the club captaincy. In Somerset's first match of 1886, Sainsbury hit his highest score for the county in almost three years, scoring 90 out of a Somerset total of 241. The bowling of Arnold Fothergill helped to restrict their opponents, Warwickshire, in the second innings; but faced with requiring 150 in their second innings for victory, Somerset were bowled out for 58. Throughout 1886, Sainsbury's batting continued to be more fruitful than his efforts in the previous two years of first-class cricket, and he regularly made scores in the twenties and thirties. He hit 94 from the middle order against the MCC in mid-August, his highest score of the season. Toward the end of the 1886 season the arrival of Sammy Woods and George Nichols vastly improved the quality of the bowling for the county, but 1887 was nevertheless marked by a slow start. A victory over Essex, in which Sainsbury scored 71, was bracketed by heavy losses to Warwickshire and Gloucestershire. Against Hampshire, Sainsbury reached his highest total for Somerset, scoring 164 out of a total of 315, to help his side on their way to a six-wicket victory. A big win over Warwickshire followed, and the county was said to be "a ship heading out for an ocean of prosperity".

Sainsbury's scores dipped again for Somerset in 1888; his highest total for the county was an unbeaten 42 against the MCC. In contrast, in a match played for the MCC, Sainsbury struck his highest total for the side, scoring 180 runs against Wiltshire at Lord's. Somerset were rated as the best of the second-class counties in both 1887 and 1888, but at the club's annual general meeting, a long discussion took place regarding the captaincy of the club. Sainsbury was unable to be present for the meeting, but had sent a letter advising that if he was removed as captain, he did not feel he could play for the county any more. His letter was not well received at the meeting, and it was decided to replace him as captain with another player who lived closer to Taunton, and was able to play more of the county matches, as Sainsbury had missed a number during 1888. Roe was selected as his replacement, with Hewett as vice-captain. A vote of thanks was given to Sainsbury for his service to the county club.

== Move to Gloucestershire ==
Over the following two seasons, 1889 and 1890, Sainsbury played club cricket for Lansdown, but no county cricket, as he served his residential qualification for Gloucestershire. At Gloucestershire's annual meeting in April 1891, W. G. Grace welcomed Sainsbury to the club, and there was some mirth at the expense of Somerset regarding his move. His first appearance for his new county was in match in early May between "Club and Ground" sides from Gloucestershire and Glamorgan; his first-class debut for the county was against Kent later that month, when he scored 12 runs during a rain-affected match. He was not the only former Somerset player to appear for Gloucestershire in the match – his fellow opening partner at Somerset, Octavius Radcliffe, had moved across the county border in 1886. Sainsbury played 13 times for Gloucestershire that season, with his highest score being 36, made against Yorkshire at Bramall Lane, Sheffield. He scored 259 runs at an average of 13.63, and did not bowl. An appearance for Lansdown that summer, against the Royal Agricultural College, Cirencester, saw him score 228 runs in a drawn match. The following year was his last in first-class cricket, during which he made five appearances, all for Gloucestershire, scoring 100 runs, at an average of 10.00. He continued to play for Lansdown, who he captained in 1893, scoring over 1,000 runs that season, Clifton, and the MCC for a number of years.

== Captaincy ==
During Sainsbury's first year as Somerset captain, the county suffered two of its heaviest defeats in first-class cricket at the hands of Gloucestershire and Surrey, and was stripped of its first-class status. But it was the club secretary who was replaced at the end of that season, and Sainsbury remained in position as club captain, perhaps indicating that the club felt it was a lack of resources, rather than Sainsbury's captaincy, that was to blame for the poor performances. In From Sammy to Jimmy: An Official History of Somerset County Cricket Club, Peter Roebuck suggests that Sainsbury was key in the improvements made by the county in 1888, but fellow cricket historian David Foot appears to portray a more negative image in his book Sunshine, Sixes and Cider, suggesting that during Sainsbury's time as captain he may have included players in the team "on the strength of [their] social charm and ability to drink into the early hours".

== Later life and death ==
Sainsbury married Mary Stevens Chamen on 28 August 1883 at Christ Church, Wanstead, Essex. He established an eponymous oil cake company in Bristol. He died on 28 October 1930, aged 79 in Weston-super-Mare, Somerset, and his funeral was held at St Paul's Church in Weston-super-Mare. He was survived by at least two sons and two daughters. One of those sons, E. A. Sainsbury, played cricket for Weston-super-Mare and the Gloucestershire Colts. At the time of his death, he had a gross estate worth just over £9,234. His grandson, John Sainsbury, played two first-class matches for Somerset in 1951.

== Bibliography ==
- Roebuck, Peter. From Sammy to Jimmy: The Official History of Somerset County Cricket Club (1991 ed.). London: Partridge Press. ISBN 1-85225-085-2.
- Foot, David. Sunshine, Sixes and Cider: The History of Somerset Cricket (1986 ed.). Newton Abbot, Devon: David & Charles. ISBN 0-7153-8890-8.

Sporting positions
Preceded by Stephen Newton	Somerset County Cricket Captain; 1885	Succeeded by Herbie Hewett
