= Edward Stanley (cricketer) =

English cricketer (1852–1896)

Personal information
- Full name: Edward Stanley
- Born: 29 June 1852; Charlton Horethorne, Somerset, England
- Died: 7 April 1896 (aged 43); Accra, Gold Coast

Domestic team information
- Years: Team
- 1884: Somerset County Cricket Club

Career statistics
Competition	First-class
Matches	1
Runs scored	0
Batting average	0.00
100s/50s	0/0
Top score	0
Catches/stumpings	0/0
- Source: ESPNcricinfo, 24 January 2019

Major Edward Stanley (29 June 1852 – 7 April 1896) was an English military officer who played one first-class cricket match for Somerset County Cricket Club as an emergency stand-in in 1884. Somerset had arrived in Manchester a player short for their fixture against Lancashire, and had to seek special permission to include Stanley in their team. Stanley lived in Manchester, but had been born in Somerset, and thus qualified for the county. His only first-class appearance was not successful; he did not bowl, and scored no runs in either innings of the match.

== Life and career ==
Edward Stanley was born in Charlton Horethorne, a village between Sherborne and Wincanton in south-east Somerset, on 29 June 1852. He was the son of Edmond Stanley Stanley, a vicar. Due to his father's position, he moved often during his childhood, spending time in Pembroke and then Saint Saviour, Jersey. Stanley attended Victoria College, Jersey, a private school, where he played cricket for the school's first team from 1868 until 1870. He was also a keen athlete, and won a mile-race in a time of 5:45.

Stanley became an assistant master in a Herefordshire school, but left this job to join the British Army. He lived a nomadic lifestyle after this, travelling around the world with his military postings. Initially serving in the 2nd West India Regiment, he spent time in British Guiana and Ipswich before transferring to the 2nd Regiment of Foot which took him to Ireland and Manchester. A subsequent transfer to the North Staffordshire Regiment sent him to the West Indies, before domestic appointments to Lichfield, Plymouth and Portsmouth. He retired from the army in 1888 as a major. Two years later, he joined the Colonial Service and was posted in 1892 as Inspector General of the Houssa Force in Lagos, Nigeria. He had been in the role for four years when he was taken ill with malaria. While sailing home to England from Lagos, he died on 7 April 1896, when the boat put into Accra in Ghana.

== County cricket appearance ==
In late August 1884, Somerset County Cricket Club had just lost to Kent to record their fourth loss in five matches during 1884. Most of the team travelled from Tunbridge Wells, where that match had been played, to Manchester to play the next day. They were due to be met in Manchester by three members of the Somerset team that had not been able to make it to Kent; John Challen, Bill Roe and Herbert Fowler. Unfortunately for Somerset, Fowler was taken ill and had to withdraw from the match. Newspaper reports on the first day's play either listed ten players, omitting Fowler, or included him as 'absent'; no mention was made of Stanley.

Despite these reports, Somerset had managed to get permission from Lancashire for Edward Stanley to play for them. Stanley was posted to Manchester at the time as a captain in the 2nd Regiment of Foot, and was qualified to play for Somerset on the basis of his birth in the county. He did come out to bat in the first innings at number eleven, but had to retire hurt after being hit by the second delivery he faced. In the second innings, he once again batted eleventh, but was dismissed first ball. By the end of the second day, he was correctly listed on newspaper scorecards, though some listed him as 'absent' for the first innings. Somerset lost the match by ten wickets.

Stanley did not appear in first-class cricket again, meaning that his 'career' featured one match, in which he scored no runs, and took no wickets or catches. He was a keen club cricketer, and appeared for Lichfield Cricket Club amongst others.

== See also ==
- Harry Winter (cricketer), an almost parallel case
