= Bill Fowler =

Bill Fowler may refer to:

- William Herbert Fowler (1856–1941), also known as Bill, English amateur cricketer
- Bill Fowler (cricketer, born 1959), retired English cricketer
- William M. Fowler (born 1944), also known as Bill, American naval historian
