= Charles Winter (cricketer, born 1903) =

English cricketer

Personal information
- Full name: Charles Arthur Winter
- Born: 24 December 1903; Edmonton, Middlesex, England
- Died: 4 March 1982 (aged 78); Farnham Common, Buckinghamshire, England
- Batting: Right-handed
- Bowling: Right-arm fast-medium
- Role: Bowler
- Relatives: Charles E Winter (father)

Domestic team information
- Years: Team
- 1921–1925: Somerset
- FC debut: 3 August 1921 Somerset v Glamorgan
- Last FC: 4 July 1925 Somerset v Yorkshire

Career statistics
Competition	First-class
Matches	26
Runs scored	437
Batting average	10.92
100s/50s	0/0
Top score	44*
Balls bowled	943
Wickets	15
Bowling average	38.13
5 wickets in innings	0
10 wickets in match	0
Best bowling	4/61
Catches/stumpings	5/–
- Source: CricketArchive, 11 May 2010

Charles Arthur Winter (24 December 1903 – 4 March 1982) was an English cricketer who played 26 first-class matches for Somerset County Cricket Club between 1921 and 1925. A right-handed batsman, he scored 437 first-class runs for the county from the middle-to-lower order. He also bowled occasionally for Somerset as a right-arm fast-medium bowler, claiming 15 wickets a bowling average of 38.13.

== Cricket career ==
Winter made his debut for Somerset in 1921, aged 18, in a County Championship match against Glamorgan. Batting in the middle order, he was dismissed for one in his only innings of a drawn match. He reached double figures for the first time in his fifth match, against Hampshire in 1922, scoring 15 in the first-innings and remaining 11 not out in the second. He made his highest score in a University Match against Cambridge University in 1924, scoring an unbeaten 44.

Throughout his career, Winter generally batted in the middle-to-lower order, despite not being used as a front-line bowler. His fifteen career first-class wickets were spread throughout his cricketing career, with his best return coming in a 1924 match against Yorkshire, when he took four wickets in twelve and a half overs. Winter's best season with both bat and ball was the 1924, in which he claimed almost half of his wickets, and well over a third of his runs. The season also saw him represent the Marylebone Cricket Club (MCC) in a one-day match against Indian Gymkhana. During the match, held at Lord's, he scored six in a drawn match.

Winter's father, also named Charles Winter, had previously played for Somerset between 1882 and 1895 as a fast bowler.

== Military career ==
On 6 May 1944, Winter was gazetted into the Royal Electrical and Mechanical Engineers as a second lieutenant.
