= Joe Ambler =

English cricketer

Personal information
- Full name: Joe Ambler
- Born: 12 February 1860; Huddersfield, Yorkshire, England
- Died: 10 February 1899 (aged 38); Huddersfield, Yorkshire, England
- Batting: Right-handed
- Bowling: Right-arm medium

Domestic team information
- Years: Team
- 1883: Somerset
- 1886: Yorkshire
- First-class debut: 30 July 1883 Somerset v Marylebone Cricket Club
- Last First-class: 21 June 1886 Yorkshire v Cambridge University

Career statistics
Competition	First-class
Matches	8
Runs scored	197
Batting average	14.07
100s/50s	0/1
Top score	76
Balls bowled	468
Wickets	7
Bowling average	31.71
5 wickets in innings	0
10 wickets in match	0
Best bowling	4/54
Catches/stumpings	5/2
- Source: CricketArchive, 21 November 2012

Joe Ambler (12 February 1860 – 10 February 1899) was an English professional first-class cricketer who made eight appearances in county cricket during the 1880s, playing for both Yorkshire and Somerset. A right-handed batsman and right-arm fast-medium paced bowler, Ambler also kept wicket on occasion.

== Life and career ==
Ambler was born in Huddersfield in Yorkshire on 12 February 1860. His first recorded cricket appearance is for Wakefield in 1874; facing the All England Eleven, Ambler was part of a 22-man team representing Wakefield. He opened the bowling in both innings, and claimed three wickets in all, while his scores of 28 and 12 made him the only Wakefield player to reach double figures in both innings. He appeared as part of Wakefield 22-man team to face "Yorkshire United" in each of the following two seasons without excelling himself.

In 1883, he was employed as a professional by Somerset County Cricket Club, and played four times for the county that season. He made his first-class cricket debut for the club on 30 July 1883, against the Marylebone Cricket Club (MCC). In the match, he scored 76 runs in Somerset's only innings, and during the MCC's first innings, he took four wickets for 54; both his batting total and his bowling figures were to be the best of his first-class career. In the following match, he was promoted to open the batting for Somerset, but was dismissed for a duck, and dropped to number six in the second innings. Ambler kept wicket for Somerset against Surrey in August 1883, claiming two stumpings and two catches in Surrey's second innings. In all for Somerset, Ambler scored 129 runs at an average of 18.42, and took seven wickets at 28.57.

No further appearances are recorded for Ambler until 1886, when he played in four games for his native Yorkshire County Cricket Club. He made his club debut against Cambridge University, scoring 11 runs in the first innings, and a duck in the second batting at number six. His best match for Yorkshire was against Middlesex, when he scored 25 and 17, at Lord's. He only scored 68 runs during his time with Yorkshire, and was rarely asked to bowl, taking no wickets from his 44 deliveries. During the 1890s, Ambler played in the Lancashire League for the East Lancashire Cricket Club. He died on 10 February 1899, in Huddersfield.
