= Harry Winter (cricketer) =

English cricketer

Harry Edmund Winter (7 December 1857 – 17 January 1921) was an English cricketer who played first-class cricket for Somerset County Cricket Club in 1884.

Winter's single appearance in first-class cricket for Somerset came in the match against Kent at Tunbridge Wells in August 1884 and is, like that of Edward Stanley in Somerset's following match against Lancashire, the subject of some mystery. In the contemporary report of the first day's play in the match in The Times newspaper, the day finished with Kent's first innings completed and Somerset at 30 for three wickets, and among the Somerset players yet to bat was John Challen. In the report of the second day's play in the following day's newspaper, when Somerset's first innings had been completed, Challen is not in the team and "Mr H. E. Winter" is the No 11 batsman, having made an unbeaten 24. Winter made 0 in the second innings and also bowled a single (four-ball) over which went for nine runs. The authoritative CricketArchive website in its record of this match makes no mention of Challen.

== See also ==
- Edward Stanley, an almost parallel case
