= George Mirehouse =

English cricketer

Personal information
- Full name: George Tierney Mirehouse
- Born: 11 May 1863; Easton-in-Gordano, Somerset, England
- Died: 5 March 1923 (aged 59); Turramurra, Sydney, Australia
- Batting: Right-handed
- Bowling: Right-arm medium-fast

Domestic team information
- Years: Team
- 1884–1886: Cambridge University
- 1884–1885: Somerset
- 1887–1896: Marylebone Cricket Club
- First-class debut: 2 June 1884 Cambridge University v Gentlemen of England
- Last First-class: 4 June 1896 Marylebone Cricket Club v Oxford University

Career statistics
Competition	First-class
Matches	13
Runs scored	74
Batting average	4.11
100s/50s	0/0
Top score	20
Balls bowled	1,445
Wickets	22
Bowling average	27.54
5 wickets in innings	0
10 wickets in match	0
Best bowling	4/51
Catches/stumpings	4/–
- Source: ESPNcricinfo, 16 August 2019

George Tierney Mirehouse (11 May 1863 – 5 March 1923) was an English gentleman and amateur cricketer who appeared in 13 first-class cricket matches for Cambridge University, Somerset and the Marylebone Cricket Club in the 1880s. Primarily a right-arm medium-fast bowler, Mirehouse took 22 first-class wickets at an average of 27.54. Some sources give his middle name as Tiernay.

== Early life and cricket career ==
George Tierney Mirehouse was born in Easton in Gordano, Somerset, on 11 May 1863. He was the second son of Henry John Mirehouse and his wife Anne Roche; and his maternal grandfather was George Tierney Roche. He came from a clerical family; his father was the rector of St George's Church in the village, and both his grandfathers had been vicars; on the paternal side, of St George's also, and on the maternal side, of Stradbally, County Waterford near the southern coast of Ireland. He attended Westminster School, where he played for the school's cricket team, appearing for the side against both the Marylebone Cricket Club (MCC) and Charterhouse School in 1880. He then went up to Jesus College, Cambridge University in 1882.

He was not invited to play in the freshmen's trial match during his first year at Cambridge, but did feature in the senior's trial match the following season, 1884, in which he took one wicket. He was low in the pecking order to play for Cambridge that year; in another trial match between the "First Twelve" and the "Next Sixteen", Mirehouse appeared for the latter, again taking one wicket in the match. Despite this, Mirehouse made his first-class debut for the University a couple of weeks later, playing against the Gentlemen of England; a collection of the best amateur players in the country. Mirehouse was used as the second-change bowler for Cambridge, and took one wicket, that of Sandford Schultz. He featured again the following week, against a Marylebone Cricket Club and Ground side rated as relatively weak by Cricket magazine. On a pitch ruined by rain, he bowled 24 overs without taking a wicket during a heavy defeat for Cambridge. He did not play again for Cambridge that year, but did go on to make his first appearances in county cricket for Somerset County Cricket Club.

On his county debut, against Hampshire, Mirehouse took three wickets in the first innings and another in the second; his first innings record of three wickets for 33 runs was his best in first-class matches for Somerset. Mirehouse opened the bowling alongside E. W. Bastard against Kent, but bowled 28 overs in the match without taking a wicket, while against Lancashire, he took two wickets on a pitch described as "dead from recent rains and in favour of the bowlers." Mirehouse had some appearances of note for the Lansdown Cricket Club during 1884, taking four wickets against the touring Gentlemen of Philadelphia in July, and taking seven wickets against the Incogniti in August.

After again featuring in the senior's trial match in 1885, in which he took four wickets, Mirehouse was highlighted by Cricket magazine as having "a good length ball" and was toted as a possibility for making it into the first team. He began the season as part of Cambridge's team, taking five wickets for the "First Twelve" against the "Next Sixteen" in the final trial match, and then took six wickets in a match against a representative England side described as weak by Cricket. In three further matches for Cambridge that season, Mirehouse did not have as much success, and by the time of the Varsity Match, in which he did not play, was considered a fringe player for the team. After the conclusion of the university term, Mirehouse made his fourth and final appearance for Somerset in first-class cricket, taking two wickets in a heavy loss to Gloucestershire.

He played seven first-class matches for the university, but did not appear in the Varsity Match against Oxford University. Mirehouse achieved his best performance in first-class cricket for Cambridge, claiming four wickets in the second innings for the university against CI Thornton's XI. He also appeared a number of times for both Somerset and the Marylebone Cricket Club.

== Later life ==
Mirehouse emigrated to Turramurra, Sydney where he ran a sugar refinery. He suffered from ill-health, including an ulcer which affected him for some time, but this was later cured. In an effort to improve his health, he took a six-week break on the south coast of Australia. On his return, he voiced concerns about business matters, and a few days later on 5 March 1923, hanged himself from his bed with a sash cord. A letter Mirehouse started writing to a friend in Bristol lamented: "My sufferings the past six months have been beyond all expression." Mirehouse had £4,300 of stocks and £165 cash invested with the Bank of Australasia.

Mirehouse had never married, and his estate was left to his cousin, and brother-in-law, Egerton Bagot Byrd Levett-Scrivener.
