= Stephen Newton =

English Amateur cricketer and schoolmaster

Personal information
- Full name: Stephen Cox Newton
- Born: 21 April 1853; Nailsea, Somerset, England
- Died: 16 August 1916 (aged 63); Ipswich, Suffolk, England
- Batting: Right-handed
- Role: Batsman

Domestic team information
- Years: Team
- 1876: Cambridge University
- 1876–1890: Somerset
- 1885: Middlesex
- 1885–1890: Marylebone Cricket Club (MCC)
- First-class debut: 8 May 1876 Cambridge University v England XI
- Last First-class: 23 May 1890 MCC v Lancashire

Career statistics
Competition	First-class
Matches	33
Runs scored	1,137
Batting average	20.30
100s/50s	0/6
Top score	86
Balls bowled	252
Wickets	2
Bowling average	92.50
5 wickets in innings	0
10 wickets in match	0
Best bowling	2/54
Catches/stumpings	20/–
- Source: CricketArchive, 19 July 2008

Stephen Cox Newton (21 April 1853 – 16 August 1916) was an English cricketer who represented, and captained, Somerset County Cricket Club in the late 19th century. During a 14-year first-class cricket career, he also represented Cambridge University, Middlesex and the Marylebone Cricket Club (MCC).

He made his debut in first-class cricket for Cambridge University, where he was awarded his Blue. He then spent nine seasons playing for Somerset, and captained the side for the last five of those seasons. Working as a schoolmaster at Highgate School in London from 1876 to 1884, his playing opportunities for the south-western county were limited, and from 1885 he only played first-class cricket at Lord's, representing Middlesex in three matches that season, and appearing for the MCC on nine occasions over six years. He returned to play for Somerset in 1887 and 1890 when they had lost their first-class status. He worked as headmaster of Loudon House School in London for some years from 1888, and died following an operation in 1916 in Ipswich.

== Early life ==
Stephen Cox Newton was born on 21 April 1853 in Nailsea, Somerset to Robert Newton and Elizabeth Catherine Cox. He attended Victoria College, Jersey, where he played in the school cricket team for seven summers, from 1866 to 1872, and topped the batting averages in five of those years (1867, 1868, 1869, 1870, and 1872). He also captained the side during his last three years at the school.

On completion of his time at Victoria College, Newton continued his education at Cambridge University, attending Corpus Christi College. He played in the Freshman's match in 1873, in which made scores of two and twelve and took two wickets. A report in the Cambridge Independent Press concluded that very few of the players competing showed promise, and that they would "be surprised if more than two will be awarded their Blues". Accordingly, Newton was not selected for the university team until final year at Cambridge. Despite this, he appeared a number of times during the summer vacation, known at Cambridge as the "long vacation", for the eponymous Cambridge Long Vacation Club, captaining the team in 1875.

He played five first-class matches for the university, all in 1876. His highest score during these matches was the 33 not out that he scored in the second innings of his first-class debut, against an England XI. He was awarded his cricketing Blue, scoring seven runs at number ten during a nine wicket Cambridge victory over Oxford University.

== Somerset County Cricket Club ==
=== Pre-first-class years ===
Newton assisted Somerset from 1876 until 1890. The county cricket club had only been formally set-up the previous year, and was seeking first-class status. The majority of matches played by Newton for the county between 1876 and 1878 are recorded by CricketArchive as being for the 'Gentlemen of Somerset', and are not categorised as first-class cricket, and although those from 1879 onwards are recorded as being for 'Somerset', they are generally regarded as remaining a 'second-class' of cricket.

During these pre-first-class seasons, Newton made a name for himself, and in his official history of the club, Peter Roebuck describes him as one of the talents of the side. He took on the captaincy of the club in 1880, a season in which he passed 30 runs in five of the recorded seven innings in which he played. (Note: For individual match scorecards see) His highest score recorded on CricketArchive during these years for Somerset was the 91 which he scored in 1876 against the Gentlemen of Dorset. Team-mate Bill Roe described Newton as a useful batsman who favoured playing balls on his pads. (Note: Commonly known as pad play, removing the danger of being caught.) In his obituary, Newton was described as being "a most excellent field", particularly strong at cover-point, while Haygarth's Scores and Biographies characterised him as "a fine and free hitter, and a most excellent field". He was the county's top run-scorer in 1877, accumulating 285 runs at an average of 25.90, and he was also one of their principle bowlers, collecting 21 wickets during the season. He remained near the top of the batting charts for the club the following year, scoring the second-most runs behind Edward Sainsbury, 146 at an average of 18.25. He was used less as a bowler than in the previous year, taking just six wickets. He once again trailed only Sainsbury amongst batsmen in 1880, scoring 278 runs at an average of 30.88. He was appointed as the club captain for 1881, though he was not able to play as frequently for the club, and finished the season with 93 runs from five innings at an average of 18.3.

=== First-class cricket ===
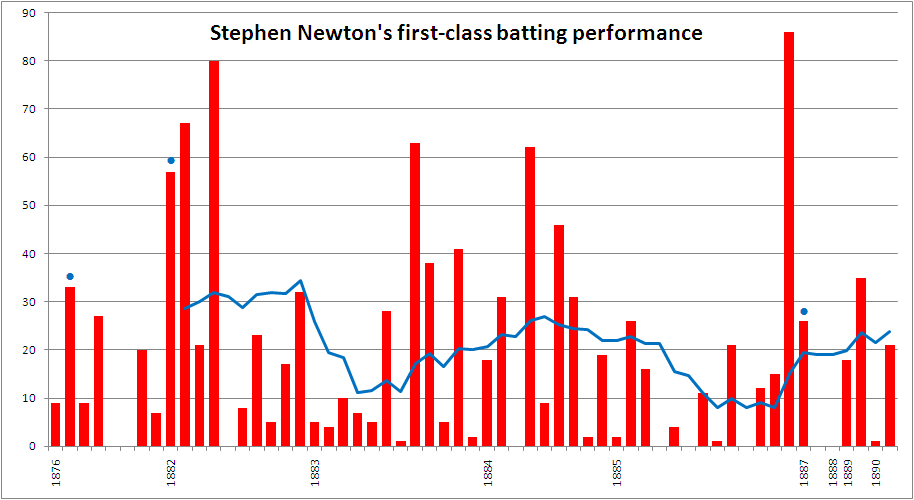
An innings-by-innings breakdown of Newton's first-class batting career, showing runs scored (red bars) and the average of the last ten innings (blue line).

Somerset gained first-class status in 1882, and retained it for four seasons. Newton was the club captain for the first three of these seasons, becoming the county's first official captain. He did not, however, appear in Somerset's first three matches: as a schoolmaster in London, he only played for the county in late-July and August. In his first match as a first-class cricket captain, he top-scored in both innings, with 57 and 67, as Somerset lost to MCC by one wicket. He then made 80 in the side's next match, a victory over Hampshire. He fared less well in the remainder of the 1882 season, failing to reach a half-century in any of his other three matches. Newton's batting average of 34.44 from his five first-class matches in 1882 was the highest he achieved during his first-class career, and both his total number of runs scored (310) and his number of half-centuries (3) during the season were also career highs.

Newton suffered a slow start to his 1883 campaign, failing to pass 10 runs in his first five innings. His improvements improved in his next three matches, highlighted by a half-century against Gloucestershire, scored during a 135 run partnership with Edward Sainsbury. His batting average for the season was almost half that of the previous year, and despite playing two additional innings he scored two less half-centuries than in 1882. In his first match for Somerset in 1884, Newton claimed his only wickets in first-class cricket. Bowling with a style that is not recorded on CricketArchive or Cricinfo, he claimed the wickets of Hampshire's Arthur Richards and HH Armstrong, both batsmen being caught off his bowling. Newton utilised himself as a bowler only after using every other member of the side, with the exception of wicket-keeper Francis Terry. In his next match, Newton avoided a pair against Lancashire by top-scoring in Somerset's second innings with 62. That score was to be the last half-century of Newton's season, and his last in first-class cricket for Somerset. He added two further scores above 30 against Kent, scoring 46 and 31, He played three less innings than in the previous season, but surpassed his total runs from that season, and improved his average to 24.22. In his three years of first-class cricket for Somerset, he scored no centuries, five half-centuries, and averaged 24.56 with the bat, higher than he finished with any other first-class cricket side.

== Playing at Lord's ==
From the 1885 season, all of Newton's first-class appearances were made for either Middlesex or the Marylebone Cricket Club (MCC) at Lord's in St John's Wood, London. Having been a member of the MCC since 1878, Newton made his debut for the club in first-class competition against Nottinghamshire in May 1885. He appeared for the club five times during 1885. In contrast to his time at Somerset, he did not restrict himself to playing only during late-July and August. Playing for the side against Lancashire, Newton made his highest total in first-class cricket, scoring 86 in the second-innings of the match. This score was the only half-century that Newton scored for a side other than Somerset. Newton appeared three times for Middlesex during 1885, for whom he qualified under the residential criterion. He averaged 5.33 for the county with the bat, and did not appear again after 1885. He appeared once for the MCC in first-class cricket in each of the 1887, 1888, 1889 and 1890 seasons, after which he did not play first-class cricket again. His final first-class match was in May 1890 when he scored 1 and 21 during a seven wicket loss to Lancashire.

== Later playing days ==
Newton returned to play three further matches for Somerset in 1887 and 1890, when they did not hold first-class status. He opened the innings for the county twice in 1887, passing 20 on three out of four occasions. During Somerset's successful 1890 season, when they remained unbeaten against other county opposition, Newton batted at number four, scoring 3 and 0, his final recorded appearance for Somerset. CricketArchive records one further appearance for Newton, playing in Felixstowe for the MCC against Suffolk in 1905, aged 52. Opening the batting, he scored 87 to help his side to a nine wicket victory.

== Teaching and later life ==
On graduating Newton worked as a schoolmaster at Highgate School in Highgate, London from 1876 to 1884 and from 1888 he was headmaster of Loudon House School in St John's Wood, London. He died on 16 August 1916 in a nursing home in Ipswich, Suffolk after an operation.

== Bibliography ==
- Roebuck, Peter (1991). From Sammy to Jimmy: The Official History of Somerset County Cricket Club (1991 ed.). London: Partridge Press. ISBN 1-85225-085-2.
- Foot, David (1986). Sunshine, Sixes and Cider: The History of Somerset Cricket (1986 ed.). Newton Abbot, Devon: David & Charles. ISBN 0-7153-8890-8.

Sporting positions
Preceded by None	Somerset County Cricket Captain; 1882–1884	Succeeded by Edward Sainsbury
