= Horatio Ernest Hall =

English cricketer (1861–1919)

Ernest Hall
Personal information
- Full name: Horatio Ernest Hall
- Born: 25 April 1861; Bedminster, Somerset
- Died: 1 December 1919 (aged 58); Clifton, Bristol
- Bowling: Medium pace
- Relatives: HGH Hall (brother)

Domestic team information
- Years: Team
- 1884–1885: Somerset

Career statistics
Competition	First-class
Matches	3
Runs scored	43
Batting average	8.60
100s/50s	0/0
Top score	23
Balls bowled	318
Wickets	3
Bowling average	48.33
5 wickets in innings	0
10 wickets in match	0
Best bowling	2/67
Catches/stumpings	1/0
- Source: CricketArchive, 29 June 2021

Horatio Ernest Hall (Note: Mistakenly referred to as Egerton Hawkesley Hall in some sources.) (25 April 1861 – 1 December 1919) played cricket for Somerset from 1881 to 1885; the final three matches he played for the team were first-class games. He was born at Clifton, Bristol, Bristol and died at Axbridge, Somerset.

in his first-class matches for Somerset, Hall was usually a lower-order batsman and a bowler, though his batting and bowling styles are not known. In his final match for the county, the game against Hampshire in 1885, he finished not out at the end of the first innings and was then promoted to open the batting in the second innings, scoring 23, his highest first-class score. This was the game in which Somerset played with only nine men in their side, and at the end of that season they lost their first-class status, and Hall played for them no more.

== Bibliography ==
- Hill, Stephen (2016). Somerset Cricketers 1882 – 1914. Wellington, Somerset: Halsgrove. ISBN 978-0-85704-291-0.
