= Henry Hall (Somerset cricketer) =

English cricketer

Personal information
- Full name: Henry George Hamlet Hall
- Born: 24 December 1857; Bedminster, Somerset
- Died: 13 February 1934 (aged 76); Southmead, Bristol

Domestic team information
- Years: Team
- 1882–1885: Somerset

Career statistics
Competition	First-class
Matches	2
Runs scored	2
Batting average	0.66
100s/50s	0/0
Top score	2
Balls bowled	168
Wickets	1
Bowling average	57.00
5 wickets in innings	0
10 wickets in match	0
Best bowling	1/47
Catches/stumpings	1/–
- Source: ESPNcricinfo, 15 August 2018

Henry George Hamlet Hall (24 December 1857 – 13 February 1934) played cricket for Somerset from 1879 to 1887; two of the matches he played for the team were first-class games. He was born at Bedminster, Bristol and died at Southmead, also in Bristol.

Hall, a lower-order batsman and a bowler whose bowling style is unknown, has the distinction of taking the first wicket ever taken by Somerset in an authenticated first-class match when he had Lancashire opening batsman and captain Albert Hornby caught in the match at Old Trafford on 8 June 1882, and he followed it with a catch to dismiss the second Lancashire batsman, Walter Robinson. There were no other successes for Hall in this game: no more catches, wickets or runs when he batted and he then did not play against for Somerset in any first-class fixture for three years. By the time he reappeared for a single game in 1885 against Gloucestershire, whose team included W. G. Grace, he was being played as an opening batsman: to no great effect, as he scored 0 and 2 and Somerset lost very heavily. Though Hall went on to play minor matches for a further 10 years, this was his last first-class cricket game.
