= Octavius Radcliffe =

English cricketer

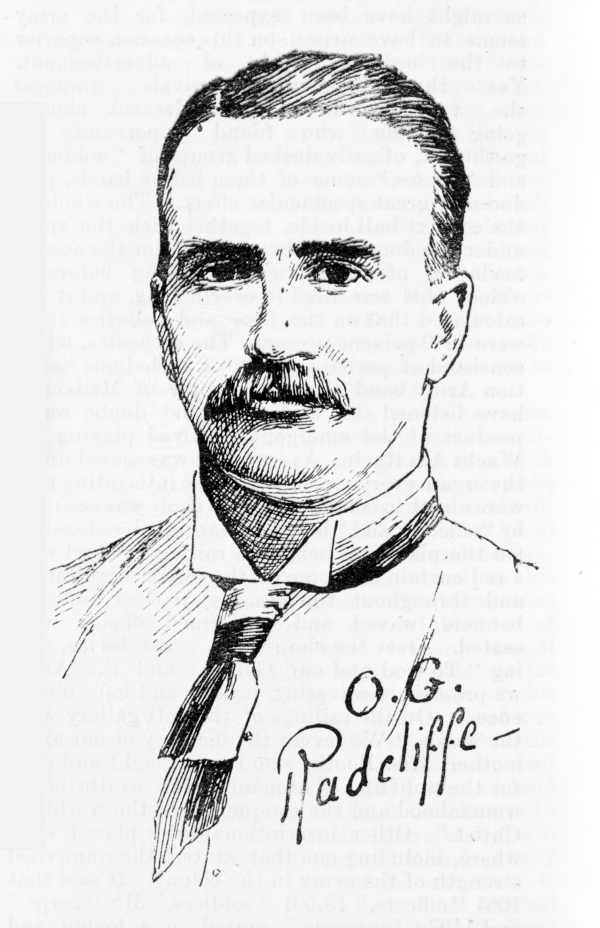

Personal information
- Full name: Octavius Goldney Radcliffe
- Born: 20 October 1859; North Newnton, Wiltshire, England
- Died: 13 April 1940 (aged 80); Calne, Wiltshire, England
- Batting: Right-handed
- Bowling: Right-arm offbreak

Domestic team information
- Years: Team
- 1885: Somerset
- 1886–1893: Gloucestershire
- First-class debut: 16 July 1885 Somerset v Hampshire
- Last First-class: 7 August 1893 Gloucestershire v Sussex

Career statistics
Competition	First-class
Matches	144
Runs scored	5406
Batting average	21.03
100s/50s	5/24
Top score	117
Balls bowled	5936
Wickets	103
Bowling average	29.61
5 wickets in innings	2
10 wickets in match	0
Best bowling	5/43
Catches/stumpings	60/–
- Source: CricketArchive, 11 March 2011

Octavius Goldney Radcliffe, born at North Newnton, Wiltshire on 20 October 1859 and died on 13 April 1940, played first-class cricket for Somerset and Gloucestershire.
