= Albert Clapp =

English cricketer

Personal information
- Full name: Albert Edward Clapp
- Born: 3 May 1867; Chelsea, London, England
- Died: 3 June 1936 (aged 69); Bristol, England
- Batting: Right-handed
- Bowling: Right-arm medium
- Role: Batsman

Domestic team information
- Years: Team
- 1885–1895: Somerset
- 1891–1896: Shropshire
- First-class debut: 16 July 1885 Somerset v Hampshire
- Last First-class: 3 June 1895 Somerset v Middlesex

Career statistics
Competition	First-class
Matches	10
Runs scored	152
Batting average	10.85
100s/50s	0/1
Top score	60*
Catches/stumpings	1/–
- Source: CricketArchive, 19 January 2014

Albert Edward Clapp (3 May 1867 – 3 June 1936) was an English professional cricketer who played for Somerset and Shropshire between 1885 and 1895. He played most of his career in the second tier of county cricket, but did appear ten times for Somerset in first-class cricket. A right-handed batsman, Clapp began his career playing first-class cricket with Somerset in 1885, and from 1891 he alternated between both Somerset and Shropshire. He made his final county appearance in 1896, while his final recorded match was two years later. He achieved his highest first-class score of 60 not out against Hampshire in his penultimate first-class match.

== Life and career ==
Clapp was born in Chelsea, west London, on 3 May 1867, and was educated at Long Ashton School, Bristol. At age eighteen, he made his county cricket debut for Somerset as a professional. His first match was Somerset's 1885 season opener, against Hampshire, and batting as part of the middle order, Clapp scored three runs in the first innings, but was out without scoring in the second. He made two further appearances for Somerset that year: in his second, he achieved his highest score of the season, 23 not out, against Gloucestershire, while in the third he twisted his knee, and was unable to bat in either innings. At the end of the 1885 season, Somerset were stripped of their first-class status due to their poor performances, and inability to field a full side in all their fixtures.

During Somerset's years as a "second-class" county, Clapp continued with the team, batting throughout the order as required, and occasionally bowling his medium-pace deliveries. He achieved two half-centuries for the county during this time, against Warwickshire in 1887, and Staffordshire in 1889. His score of 85 not out in the first of those matches was the highest score he made for Somerset, while a return of two wickets for 17 runs against the same team in 1886 was his best bowling analysis for the county. In 1890, Clapp played in eleven of Somerset's scheduled thirteen fixtures, of which the club won all but won, which was a tie against Middlesex. As a result of this successful season, Somerset were readmitted to first-class cricket for the subsequent 1891 season. For his work in 1890, Clapp was allocated part of the £132 that Somerset allocated between their three professional players that summer. (Note: According to The National Archives' currency converter, £132 in 1890 would be the equivalent of £7,905.48 in 2005.)

From 1891, Clapp only appeared infrequently for Somerset, instead playing more often for Shropshire, a team which primarily played against other "second-class" counties, or against club sides, while being club professional for Oswestry. In late May 1891, he travelled with Somerset to London to play two matches, against Middlesex and Surrey; in his three batting innings he aggregated seven runs, and did not appear for Somerset again that year. For the remainder of the season, Clapp appeared for Shropshire, which was highlighted by him scoring a half-century for them against the Marylebone Cricket Club in August. For the following two seasons, Clapp did not play for Somerset, but made his county appearances solely for Shropshire. During this time, he achieved a batting average of 35.66 for Shropshire, and scored six half-centuries and one century, the latter score coming in the second innings of a match against Oxfordshire. He also bowled regularly with some success, taking 74 wickets at 16.66.

Clapp made five further first-class appearances for Somerset in 1894 and 1895, though in ten innings he only reached double figures batting twice. On the first of those occasions, he made his highest total in first-class cricket, scoring an unbeaten 60 against Hampshire. He also played in a match against the touring South Africans, though this was not considered first-class, and scored 66 and 84 not out in a high-scoring win for Somerset. He made his final first-class appearance in June 1895, facing Middlesex at Lord's. In all in first-class cricket, Clapp scored 152 runs at an average of 10.85. He continued to play with Shropshire, and scored centuries in consecutive months for the county against the Gentlemen of Cheshire: in July 1895 he scored 141 not out, while in August he improved slightly, being dismissed for 142. His final recorded match for Shropshire was in July 1896, against the Harrow Wanderers, when he got a pair. In his history of Somerset cricket, David Foot describes Clapp as an "amiable but undistinguished pro". A benefit match was played for him in 1901 between sides captained by Sammy Woods, Somerset's captain, and Dr E. H. Cook. The match was particularly notable for the 142 runs scored in 22 minutes by Woods' team. Clapp died in Bristol on 3 June 1936, aged 69.

== Bibliography ==
- Foot, David. Sunshine, Sixes and Cider: The History of Somerset Cricket (1986 ed.). Newton Abbot, Devon: David & Charles. ISBN 0-7153-8890-8.
