= Ernest Murdock =

English cricketer

Ernest George Murdock (14 November 1864 – 18 May 1926) was an English cricketer who played first-class cricket for Somerset in 1885 and for Gloucestershire in 1889. He was born at Keynsham, Somerset and died at Bower Ashton, also in Somerset.

Murdock was a right-handed lower-order batsman. In his two first-class matches for Somerset in 1885, he kept wicket at the time when Somerset was struggling to raise a full side; his highest first-class score of 14 was made in the first of these two matches, against Surrey at The Oval. Somerset lost its first-class status after the 1885 season and Murdock played some matches for the team in non-first-class cricket up to 1888. In 1889, however, he switched allegiance to Gloucestershire, where he appeared in three games in the season, achieving little with the bat, not keeping wicket, but bowling a little and taking the solitary first-class wicket of his career in his final first-class match.

He was also involved in football; as a player he was a member of Bedminster F.C., and in 1913 was appointed chairman of Bristol City.
