= Hamilton Ross =

English cricketer

Personal information
- Full name: Hamilton Ross
- Born: 26 August 1849; Grenada
- Died: 29 March 1938 (aged 88); Grenada
- Batting: Right-handed
- Role: Occasional wicket-keeper

Domestic team information
- Years: Team
- 1876: Middlesex
- 1879–1889: MCC
- 1883–1891: Somerset
- FC debut: 23 July 1874 Gentlemen v Players
- Last FC: 1 June 1891 Somerset v Surrey

Career statistics
Competition	First-class
Matches	20
Runs scored	337
Batting average	9.91
100s/50s	0/1
Top score	71
Catches/stumpings	9/2
- Source: CricketArchive, 11 January 2010

Hamilton Ross (26 August 1849 – 29 March 1938) was an English cricketer who made 20 first-class appearances between 1874 and 1891. He played twelve first-class matches for the Marylebone Cricket Club (MCC), and also appeared for Middlesex and Somerset. A right-handed batsman, he occasionally played as wicket-keeper.

== Life and career ==
Born in Grenada, British West Indies, Ross was educated at the Hermitage School, Bath, then became a student in the Middle Temple and later a barrister. He practised in both London and Bath.

In 1869, while playing for Gentlemen of Sussex against the Players of Sussex, he scored 101 in the second-innings after being promoted from batting at number eleven in the first-innings to opening in the second. A prolific scorer in club cricket, he hit six centuries in 1871. On his first-class debut however, Ross made a pair for the Gentlemen. He played one match for Middlesex in 1876, making 35 & 1 during a draw with Oxford University.

During the late 1870s, Ross played a number of matches for the 'Gentlemen of Somerset', a team of amateurs that were forerunners for Somerset County Cricket Club.
