= George Lillington =

English cricketer

George Godfrey Lillington (31 October 1843 – 25 August 1914) played first-class cricket for Somerset in 1883 and 1885. He was born at Bedminster, Bristol and died at Brislington, also in Bristol.

Lillington was a tail-end batsman and wicket-keeper. He played in just two first-class matches, one in 1883 and one in 1885. The 1883 match against Gloucestershire was the more successful of his two appearances: he made three stumpings and took a catch.
