= Tristram Welman =

English cricketer

Personal information
- Full name: Frederic Tristram Welman
- Born: 19 February 1849; Norton Fitzwarren, Somerset, England
- Died: 30 December 1931 (aged 82); South Ascot, Berkshire, England
- Batting: Right-handed
- Role: Wicket-keeper

Domestic team information
- Years: Team
- 1874–1889: Marylebone Cricket Club
- 1880: Middlesex
- 1876–1885: Somerset
- 1887–1888: Middlesex
- 1895–1901: Somerset
- First-class debut: 22 June 1874 Marylebone Cricket Club v Cambridge University
- Last First-class: 13 June 1901 Somerset v South Africans

Career statistics
Competition	First-class
Matches	65
Runs scored	737
Batting average	8.98
100s/50s	0/0
Top score	43
Catches/stumpings	83/24
- Source: CricketArchive, 20 December 2010

Frederic Tristram Welman (1849–1931) was an English amateur cricketer who played 65 first-class matches for the Marylebone Cricket Club, Somerset and Middlesex. He was a wicket-keeper who also played as a lower-order batsman. He did not pass 50 runs in any first-class innings during his career.

== Early life ==
Welman was born 19 February 1849 at Norton Manor in Norton Fitzwarren, just outside Taunton, the son of Charles Noel Welman, a Justice of the peace for Somerset. He was educated at Oxford University, but was not rated as good enough to feature in the university's cricket side. His first noted cricket appearance was for 'Surrey Club' against Uppingham School, a two-day match played at The Oval in London. During the 1870s, he appeared for both the Gentlemen of Devon, and the Gentlemen of Somerset a few times each year. When the two sides faced he each other, he appeared for the Somerset side. His first-class debut came in 1874, when he appeared for the Marylebone Cricket Club (MCC) against Cambridge University. In a nine wicket loss for the MCC, he was dismissed for a duck in the first innings, and three runs in the second. He did not play another first-class match for almost five years, when he faced Oxford University for the MCC, during which he once again was dismissed without scoring in the first innings.

== First-class regular ==
In 1880, Welman began playing significantly more first-class cricket; in addition to a match for the MCC, he also played on three occasions for Middlesex County Cricket Club, and was selected for the 'Gentlemen of England' to face Oxford University. He played five or more first-class matches in each of the seasons from 1880 until 1888, with the exception of 1881 when he made only one first-class appearance. His best seasons with the bat were in 1882 and 1883, in each of which he passed 100 runs in total, though on both occasions his average remained under 20. He enjoyed greatest success as a wicket-keeper slightly later, the majority of his catches and stumpings coming between 1884 and 1887. His final first-class game was in 1901, for Somerset against the touring South Africans. He continued to play second-class cricket for the MCC until 1905, appearing when the London club toured in the South West of England.

== Personal life ==
There is no record of Welman being paid to work, an indication that he was likely quite wealthy. He married May, 11 years his junior, sometime between the 1881 and 1901 censuses. He died in South Ascot, Berkshire, on 30 December 1931, aged 82.
