= James Parfitt =

English amateur cricketer and lawyer

Personal information
- Full name: James John Alexander Parfitt
- Born: 23 December 1857; Bwlch, Breconshire, Wales
- Died: 17 May 1926 (aged 68); Wimbledon, Surrey, England
- Batting: Right-handed
- Bowling: Right-arm fast-medium
- Role: Bowler

Domestic team information
- Years: Team
- 1881–1882: Surrey
- 1883–1885: Somerset
- 1886: Warwickshire
- First-class debut: 11 August 1881 Surrey v Yorkshire
- Last First-class: 10 August 1885 Somerset v Surrey

Career statistics
Competition	First-class
Matches	14
Runs scored	222
Batting average	9.25
100s/50s	0/0
Top score	41*
Balls bowled	2000
Wickets	38
Bowling average	24.52
5 wickets in innings	1
10 wickets in match	1
Best bowling	7/33
Catches/stumpings	4/–
- Source: ESPNcricinfo, 15 August 2018

James John Alexander Parfitt, KC (23 December 1857 – 17 May 1926) was an English judge who was called to the bar in 1887, and served as a County Court judge from 1918 until his death eight years later. He did not approve of verbose counsel, and would often succinctly summarise their arguments. He was known as a compassionate but businesslike judge.

Early in life, he played as an amateur cricketer, appearing in fourteen first-class cricket matches during a career that spanned from 1881 until 1885. Primarily used for his fast-medium pace bowling, Parfitt played for both Surrey and Somerset during this time, and later appeared for Warwickshire in second-class cricket.

== Life and judicial career ==
Parfitt was born in Bwlch, Breconshire, Wales, on 23 December 1857, the son of Mr J. J. Parfitt of Bruton, Somerset. Parfitt's family were staunch Roman Catholics; he was educated at Prior Park College in Bath, a Roman Catholic school. His uncle, Charles Parfitt, was a clergyman in the same area. Parfitt later went up to London University, from which he graduated with a Bachelor of Arts in 1884. He worked in education for a time, acting as a tutor at St George's College in Weybridge, Surrey and then for three years at The Oratory School in Edgbaston, Birmingham, both Roman Catholic schools. Parfitt married Elizabeth Mary Reynolds in 1900.

He was called to the bar in 1887 by the Middle Temple, of which he later became a Bencher in 1917. He initially joined the Midlands circuit as a junior counsel for the Post Office, and then a counsel to the Birmingham Assay Office. He was appointed as a Queen's Counsel in 1908, and was appointed as Recorder of Nottingham in 1916, a role he maintained until 1918. He was subsequently made a County Court Judge for the Leeds and Wakefield circuit from 1918 until 1921, and then briefly for the Sussex circuit in 1921. He served as the County Court Judge for Clerkenwell from 1921 until his death. Parfitt died on 17 May 1926 at his home in Wimbledon.

He was known for his good memory, which helped him maintain a thorough knowledge of case law, and for his ability to summarise cases quickly and effectively. He favoured similarly succinct approaches from others, and would often reproach overly wordy counsel by saying "Now you are wandering all round the Wrekin", referencing the area in which he grew up. He was also quoted as referencing cricket in the courtroom; he would use "that's not cricket" as a stern rebuke, while he once also gave the judgment, "Verdict for the defendant. Plaintiff is out, bowled middle stump, and in any case he'd have been stumped." Parfitt retained his traditional Roman Catholic beliefs, and his witticisms were sometimes quoted by the press. He was praised for his compassion and common sense. His obituary in The Times suggested that he struggled with modern inventions, particularly the telephone.

== Cricket career ==
Parfitt began his cricket career in 1881 at Surrey County Cricket Club, while studying at London University. He was chiefly known for his fast bowling, but could also be a useful batsman and fielded well in the slips or at mid-off. His debut came on 11 August against Yorkshire, in which he claimed three wickets during the first innings. He was fond of recalling that he bowled George Ulyett, an England Test cricketer, with his first delivery in first-class cricket. In his second match, a week later, Parfitt returned the best figures of his first-class career, taking seven wickets during the first innings, every one of them bowled. He collected another three wickets in the second innings to complete his only ten-wicket haul. In the six first-class matches he played during his maiden season, Parfitt took 22 wickets at an average of 17.95. He appeared just twice for Surrey in 1882, taking two wickets.

He switched from Surrey to Somerset for the 1883 season. He qualified for Somerset based on his residency in the county from 1867 to 1879, and did not have to serve an additional qualification period. As with his time at Surrey, he was only available for the county during the school holidays. He made his debut in August 1883, during which he scored his largest total with the bat, remaining unbeaten on 41 runs when Somerset were dismissed in their second innings against Gloucestershire. He appeared for the county in four matches in 1883, and then twice more during 1885, his final first-class match being played in mid-August 1885, between Somerset and Surrey. He claimed one wicket in the match, which Somerset lost by an innings and 301 runs to Parfitt's former club. He played one second-class match for Warwickshire in 1886, batting at number six against Staffordshire.

He was involved in the Emeriti Cricket Club, a wandering cricket club composed of players drawn primarily from Catholic schools. He played for them throughout the 1880s, and was the tour manager for their 1885 tour of Lancashire. He was the team's leading wicket-taker during that tour, taking 37 wickets at 16.7. He later also appeared for another wandering club, the Incogniti.

== Arms ==
Coat of arms of James Parfitt

Notes
Granted to his father on 2 July 1857 by Sir John Bernard Burke, Ulster King of Arms.
Crest
A falcon rising Argent winged beaked and legged Or on the breast a trefoil as in the arms and in the beak an ear of wheat Vert.
Escutcheon
1st & 4th Azure a cross lozengy Or in the sinister chief and dexter base points an estoile Argent over all a bend Ermine charged with a trefoil Vert 2nd & 3rd Sable on a chevron engrailed between three pistols Or as many roses Gules barbed Vert.
Motto
En Tout Parfait
