= Frederick Smith (Somerset cricketer) =

English cricketer

Frederick Aitken Leeston Smith (10 May 1854 – 27 January 1894) was an English cricketer who played first-class cricket for Somerset in 1884 and 1885. He was born at Kensington, London and died at Parkstone, Dorset. In some sources, his name is written as "Leeston-Smith". According to his obituary in Wisden Cricketers' Almanack in 1905 (which states that he died in 1903), he adopted the "Leeston" name in 1880.

Educated at Malvern College and Christ's College, Brecon, Smith was a right-handed opening or middle-order batsman and a right-arm fast bowler, though he did not bowl in first-class cricket. He played club cricket for Weston-super-Mare Cricket Club and in a match against Thornbury he hit E. M. Grace, W. G.'s elder brother, for four sixes off consecutive balls. He played in several matches for Somerset before the county club was given first-class status in 1882, but thereafter appeared in just three matches, scoring useful runs in each of them, with a highest score of 37 in his final game, against Gloucestershire in August 1885.
