= Francis Terry (cricketer) =

English cricketer

Francis William Terry (26 October 1860 – 5 October 1936) was born at Wells, Somerset and died at Mimico, Ontario, Canada. He played first-class cricket for Somerset from 1882 to 1885. He played for and captained the Canada national cricket team in international matches of non-first-class status against the United States.
