= E. W. Bastard =

English amateur cricketer (1862–1901)

Edward Bastard
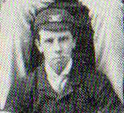

Personal information
- Full name: Edward William Bastard
- Born: 28 February 1862; Wilton, Taunton, Somerset, England
- Died: 2 April 1901 (aged 39); Taunton, Somerset, England
- Batting: Left-handed
- Bowling: Slow left-arm orthodox

Domestic team information
- Years: Team
- 1882–1885: Oxford University
- 1883–1885: Somerset
- First-class debut: 22 June 1882 Oxford University v Marylebone Cricket Club
- Last First-class: 3 September 1885 Gentlemen v Players

Career statistics
Competition	First-class
Matches	37
Runs scored	278
Batting average	6.78
100s/50s	0/0
Top score	47
Balls bowled	7,075
Wickets	137
Bowling average	21.07
5 wickets in innings	8
10 wickets in match	2
Best bowling	8/54
Catches/stumpings	15/–
- Source: CricketArchive, 22 April 2011

Edward William Bastard (28 February 1862 – 2 April 1901) was an English first-class cricketer who played for Oxford University and Somerset. Bastard was a slow left-arm orthodox bowler, described in his Wisden obituary as Somerset's best bowler during his time with the club. Bastard was also part of the Oxford team often said to be the university's best ever.

His first-class career was confined to his university years, when he appeared for both Oxford and Somerset. Close to the top of the bowling averages for both teams in each season, his 62 first-class wickets in 1885 placed him among the 20 most prolific wicket-takers in the country. Somerset's temporary loss of first-class status in 1885 brought a premature end to Bastard's first-class career when he was 23. Although he continued to play for the side in second-class cricket until 1889, by the time Somerset resumed first-class cricket in 1891, Bastard had lost his place following the emergence of Sammy Woods and the acquisitions of Ted Tyler and George Nichols. He died at the age of 39 while engaged in scholastic work in Taunton.

== Early life ==
Edward William Bastard was born in Wilton, a parish just outside Taunton, the second son of Henry Horlock Bastard. He was educated at Sherborne School, and played for the school cricket team. Although he was later known as a bowler, Bastard occasionally opened the batting for the school, as he did against Clifton College in 1881. During his time at Sherborne, he also played some games for Dorset.

== University and county cricket ==
On completion of his studies at Sherborne School, Bastard attended Wadham College, University of Oxford. He played in the Freshmen's Trial in May 1882, and collected four wickets in each innings, conceding just 35 runs from his 29 overs. His side, LML Owen's XI won by 79 runs. He played in two matches against the university's first team during his first year, opening the bowling for both the Freshmen side and the "Next XVI". He made his debut in first-class cricket that June, appearing for the university against the Marylebone Cricket Club. He claimed one wicket during the match, in which the university lost by an innings. Bastard appeared three times in first-class cricket for the university in 1883, and according to Geoffrey Bolton, author of History of the O.U.C.C, "was lucky to be chosen this year" to play in the University match against Cambridge University. Bastard was wicketless against Lancashire, and although he took three wickets in each innings against the MCC, John Foord-Kelcey took more wickets at a better average. Nevertheless, Bastard was preferred for the contest against Cambridge, thus gaining his Blue. Bastard claimed a wicket in each innings of the match, which Cambridge won by seven wickets. Bolton attributes the loss to a combination of the weather and Oxford's loss of the toss, which resulted in Cambridge batting first on a good batting pitch. Rain followed, and when Oxford batted, the pitch was described by Bolton as "really nasty".

During the university's summer break, Bastard made his debut for Somerset. His first match for the county was against the MCC in late July. He appeared six further times in 1883, against county opposition, and in all matches that season, collected 52 first-class wickets at an average of 30.20. In 1883, he also made his highest first-class score, making 47 runs during Somerset's second innings against Hampshire. He came in to bat with the score at 86 runs for the loss of seven wickets, and was the last wicket to fall, by which time Somerset had moved to 181, and Bastard had shared a tenth-wicket partnership of 74 with Arnold Fothergill. Even so, Somerset lost the match by seven wickets.

Bastard played in all eight of Oxford University's first-class matches in 1884 as part of the team which was described by Altham and Swanton as a remarkable side, and one of Oxford's best ever. The university won seven of the matches, and narrowly lost the other. During the opening match, against the Australians, Bastard was wicketless in the first innings, but took five second innings wickets, his maiden first-class five-wicket haul. Among his wickets was the tourists captain Billy Murdoch, who later that summer scored 211 runs against England in the third Test. Bolton wrote that against the Australians, "Bastard had bowled supremely well," and the performance was Bastard's best for the university during 1884; he collected his wickets steadily and finished as Oxford's second most prolific wicket-taker. He claimed 34 wickets for the side, second only to the 53 taken by Hugh Whitby, although his average of 17.00 ranked him fifth among the bowlers. In the university match that year, he claimed three wickets in each innings. Batting in Oxford's first innings, he and Benjamin Nicholls quickly scored 52 runs, and then bowling in Cambridge's second innings, he and Whitby claimed their opponent's final six wickets for just 17 runs.

He returned to play for Somerset during the summer break once again in 1884, playing four matches for the county, during which he claimed 24 wickets: more than double that of the next most prolific Somerset bowler, Charles Winter. (Note: Based upon statistics collated from the national bowling averages, and for those players who appeared for more than one side, their individual record for that season: Edward Sainsbury, Arnold Fothergill, Bill Fowler, Fred Welman, Edward Bastard, and George Mirehouse.) His best performance came against Hampshire, against whom he claimed six second innings wickets to help Somerset to their only victory of the season.

The following season, Bastard returned to play for Oxford University, along with most of the successful team of the previous year. Despite the availability of almost the same squad, Oxford did not win a single match during 1885. Four of the university's bowlers, Edward Buckland, Herbert Page, Nicholls, and Whitby had an average in excess of 24 in 1885, having averaged below 21 the previous season. The team came to rely upon the bowling of Bastard and Alfred Cochrane, both slow left-arm bowlers. Bastard began the season with a five-wicket haul in the first innings against the MCC, which he followed up with three more wickets in the second. He improved upon this performance in the next match, taking five wickets in each innings against Lancashire to complete his maiden ten-wicket haul in a first-class match, although the northern county won by 50 runs. He was less effective in later matches, claiming four wickets in an innings twice, but more often going wicketless. In the university match, Bastard's last, Oxford were bowled out on the first day for 136, and Cambridge opened a first innings lead of 151; Bastard claimed a solitary wicket from 38.3 overs. Oxford recovered in the second innings and scored 239, of which Bastard contributed 12 runs, leaving Cambridge requiring 89 runs to win, with over a day's play remaining. According to Bolton, Bastard "bowled with great skill on the last morning", and claimed three Cambridge wickets, but was not supported by his fellow bowlers, and Cambridge achieved victory before lunch on the final day.

Bastard was Somerset's leading wicket-taker again in 1885, claiming 25 wickets. (Note: Based upon statistics collated from the national bowling averages, and for those players who appeared for more than one side, their individual record for that season: Octavius Radcliffe, Fred Welman, Edward Bastard, and George Mirehouse.) In his first match for the county that summer, he recorded his second ten-wicket match. Facing Hampshire in Taunton, Bastard claimed eight wickets in the first innings, and a further three in the second as Somerset recorded their only win of the year. His next match for the county was also against Hampshire, this time in Southampton. Somerset could only field nine men in the fixture, and after batting first reached 117. In the Hampshire response, a contemporary match report recorded that Bastard "did a capital performance in the first innings of Hants, taking eight of the ten wickets at a cost of only 59 runs". Despite his performance, Hampshire passed Somerset's total and had a first innings lead of 45 runs. Somerset scored 166 in their second innings, leaving Hampshire requiring 122 to win. Bastard bowled 27 overs in the second innings, but failed to add to his wicket tally, and Hampshire won the match by eight wickets. Bastard's performances during 1885 saw him selected in two games for the Gentlemen during the Scarborough Festival. The team was a young one, as well as three of his Oxford team-mates from that season, Page, Kingsmill Key and Tim O'Brien, there were a number of players from the Cambridge team chosen. Bastard claimed five wickets in the first innings of the match against I Zingari, but failed to take any against the Players. In 1885, his 62 first-class wickets was the eighteenth highest among bowlers in the country.

== Later life ==
Bastard graduated from Oxford in 1885, gaining his B.A. that year, and collecting his M.A. three years later. He continued to play cricket for Somerset, who had by this stage been stripped of their first-class status for three reasons: they had not organised and played enough first-class fixtures during the season, their performances were not what was expected from a first-class county, and they had not succeeded in fielding a full side of eleven players in all their matches. He picked up plenty of wickets, particularly in 1886 and 1887; eleven in a match against Hampshire, with eight in the first innings, fifteen against Devon, and another eight in the first innings against Warwickshire being the highlights. However, the additions of Sammy Woods, Ted Tyler and George Nichols resulted in Bastard bowling less frequently, and he made his final appearance for the county in August 1889 against the MCC. He was not required to bowl in the match, which Somerset won by 9 wickets, thanks to Tyler and Woods. He was described by Wisden Cricketers' Almanack as "the chief bowler in the Somersetshire eleven before the County became first-class."

Bastard died in Taunton on 2 April 1901, aged 39, while employed in scholastic work.

== Bibliography ==
- Bolton, Geoffrey (1962). History of the O.U.C.C. (1st ed.). Oxford: Holywell Press.
- Roebuck, Peter. From Sammy to Jimmy: The Official History of Somerset County Cricket Club (1991 ed.). London: Partridge Press. ISBN 1-85225-085-2.
- Foot, David. Sunshine, Sixes and Cider: The History of Somerset Cricket (1986 ed.). Newton Abbot, Devon: David & Charles. ISBN 0-7153-8890-8.
