= William Herbert Fowler =

Bill Fowler
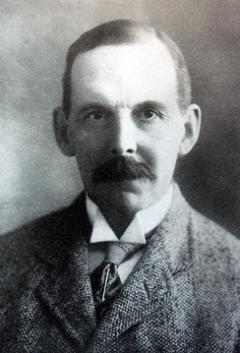

Personal information
- Full name: William Herbert Fowler
- Born: 28 May 1856; Tottenham, London, England
- Died: 13 April 1941 (aged 84); Chelsea, London, England
- Height: 6 ft 3 in (1.91 m)
- Batting: Right-handed
- Bowling: Right-arm fast

Domestic team information
- Years: Team
- 1880–1885: Marylebone Cricket Club (MCC)
- 1882–1884: Somerset
- First-class debut: 13 May 1880 MCC v Cambridge University
- Last First-class: 25 June 1885 MCC v Oxford University

Career statistics
Competition	First-class
Matches	26
Runs scored	905
Batting average	18.46
100s/50s	1/2
Top score	139
Balls bowled	1014
Wickets	23
Bowling average	22.65
5 wickets in innings	0
10 wickets in match	0
Best bowling	4/8
Catches/stumpings	6/–
- Source: CricketArchive, 26 February 2011

William Herbert Fowler (28 May 1856 – 13 April 1941), also known as Bill Fowler and Herbert Fowler, was an English amateur cricketer who played 26 first-class cricket matches during the 1880s, principally for Somerset County Cricket Club. He was an all-rounder who was best known for his big-hitting when batting. He was also a famous golf course architect, and designed Walton Heath Golf Club among many others in the United Kingdom and United States.

== Early and personal life ==
Fowler was born in Tottenham, London as the son of William Fowler, a barrister, and Rachel Maria, née Howard. In 1893, he worked as a banker, and during this time, he invested heavily, especially in the Americas.

== Cricket career ==
Fowler began his county cricket career at Essex County Cricket Club in 1877. A move to Somerset in the late 1870s saw him switch counties, and he began playing for Somerset County Cricket Club in 1879. His first-class debut was not for a county team, but instead for the well-known Marylebone Cricket Club (MCC) in 1880. Facing Cambridge University, Fowler scored 36 runs in his only innings. He passed 50 for the first time in his following match, also for the MCC, scoring 61 runs after opening the innings against Oxford University. He played in Somerset's first ever first-class match in 1882, opening the innings alongside Edward Sainsbury, but his scores of 9 and 18 were the county's highest in each innings as they lost the match by an innings. Later that season, playing against the MCC at Lord's, Fowler had his best bowling performance in first-class cricket, claiming four wickets during his seven overs, conceding just eight runs. In the same match, having scored a duck in the first innings, he scored 23 in the second, which included a boundary which travelled a reputed 157 yards before landing, leaving the ground. When the MCC visited Taunton that season, he reached his highest total in first-class cricket, totalling 139, his innings scattered with boundaries.

The 1882 season was Fowler's best with the bat in first-class cricket; the following year he failed to score a half-century, despite batting in 18 innings, and his average of 12.27 was significantly lower than the 21.36 he had managed the previous season. He only appeared twice for Somerset in 1884, and also played a side representing the South of England, and the MCC during the year. During the match for the MCC, played against Oxford University, he struck his final half-century, top-scoring for his side in the first innings with 60 runs. His final appearance in first-class cricket came the following season during the same fixture, during which he scored 8 and 20. He played occasionally for Somerset in 1887 and 1888, when they had lost their first-class status.

Fowler was known as a big-hitter of the ball, his 157-yard strike at Lord's in 1882 was reckoned to be one of the longest hits in first-class cricket at the time. A tall player, he was reckoned to weigh around 14 or 15 stone. David Foot describes him as "perhaps the earliest Somerset batsman to parade the fundamental skills of slogging." His drive was compared to his golf drive.

== Golf career ==
Cricket dominated Fowler's free time during his early years, and he played golf for the first time in 1879, aged 23 after a business trip to Bideford, Devon. A Royal Navy Captain took him to a course at Westward Ho!. He played the game with borrowed clubs, but after enjoying it he became a member of the club and continued to play. He won the handicap prize in the club's autumn tournament, but his cricketing commitments curtailed his involvement in the game during the 1880s. He returned to the game a decade later, winning a medal at Westward Ho!, playing as a scratch golfer. His improvement was marked; a 1901 newspaper described it: "A few years ago he was unknown and as he is now in his mid-forties his recent exploits appear particularly brilliant. He drives almost as far as James Braid, the Open champion." He finished joint 26th in the 1900 Open Championship, and competed for England against Scotland in each year from 1903 to 1905. He was known as an eccentric player, often varying the size of the balls and clubs with which he played: "Mr. Fowler putts sometimes with a driving iron but often uses a mallet which looks like a sandwich box with a stick stuck through the middle."

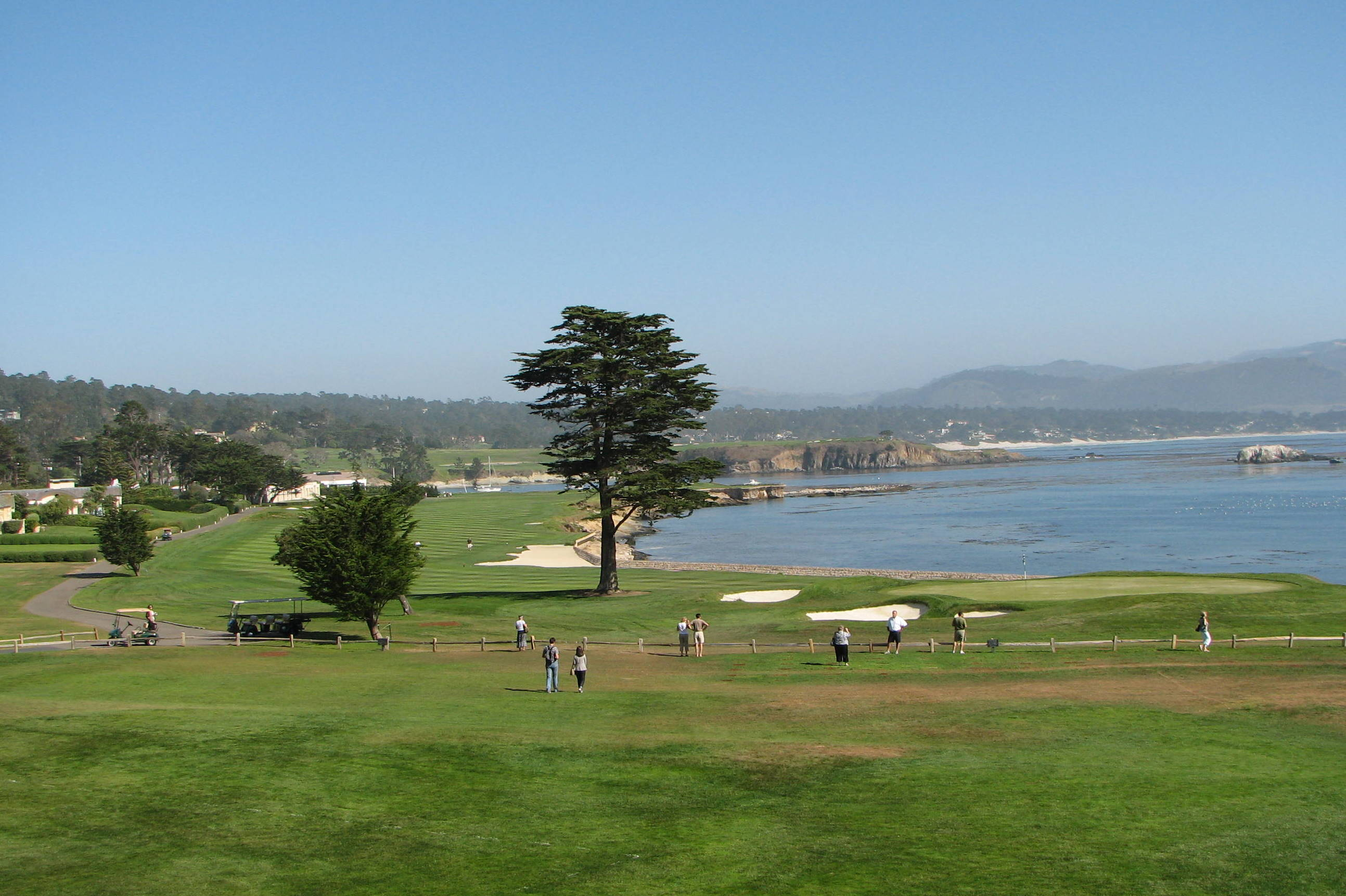
Fowler redesigned the 18th hole of the Pebble Beach Golf Links.

Fowler's brother-in-law, Sir Cosmo Bonsor approached him in 1899 about the possibility of making a golf course on Walton Heath, in Surrey, England. Three years later, Bonsor bought the ground and gave Fowler the task of designing the course. Fowler's first opinion was that "there was very little to make one suppose that a first-class course could be made upon it [Walton Heath]." When the course was opened in 1904, it was an instant success. He believed strongly that courses should follow the contours of the land, and have a natural feeling, shunning the use of "man-made contrivances", believing that topography could test the world's best golfers just as adequately.

Fowler had strong views on many aspects of a golf course, including bunkers, which he believed should have gradual slopes to allow the ball to roll to the base. Contemporaries suggested that he designed large courses that would favour big hitters such as himself, but Fowler strenuously denied this, stating that they were designed with fairness in mind. He was described in a book by Bernard Darwin as "perhaps the most daring and original of all golfing architects, and gifted with an inspired eye for the possibility of a golfing country". He designed a number of other golf courses in the United Kingdom and the United States, including the Crystal Springs Course, Beau Desert Course, and in 1922 he redesigned the 18th hole of the Pebble Beach Golf Links. He had been hired to redesign the Del Monte Golf Course, but also made some suggestions to update the Pebble Beach course, which were ignored. However, during a 1921 championship, the course owners received complaints about the short 18th hole, and asked Fowler to resolve the problem. He added just under 200 yards to the hole, transforming it from a 379-yard par 4 to a 548-yard par 5.

== Bibliography ==
- Foot, David (1986). Sunshine, Sixes and Cider: The History of Somerset Cricket (1986 ed.). Newton Abbot, Devon: David & Charles. ISBN 0-7153-8890-8.
