= Farrant Reed =

English cricketer

Personal information
- Full name: Herbert Farrant Reed
- Born: 10 September 1865; Wilton, Taunton, Somerset, England
- Died: 9 March 1911 (aged 45); Streatham, London, England
- Batting: Right-handed
- Bowling: Unknown

Domestic team information
- Years: Team
- 1882–1885: Somerset
- 1882: Marylebone Cricket Club
- First-class debut: 24 July 1882 Somerset v Hampshire
- Last First-class: 20 August 1885 Somerset v Hampshire

Career statistics
Competition	First-class
Matches	8
Runs scored	161
Batting average	11.50
100s/50s	0/0
Top score	33
Balls bowled	100
Wickets	2
Bowling average	30.50
5 wickets in innings	0
10 wickets in match	0
Best bowling	1/6
Catches/stumpings	4/–
- Source: CricketArchive, 7 May 2011

Herbert Farrant Reed (10 September 1865 – 9 March 1911) was an English cricketer who appeared in eight first-class matches between 1882 and 1885. He played primarily for Somerset County Cricket Club, but also appeared once for the Marylebone Cricket Club.
