= Bill Roe (cricketer) =

English cricketer (1861–1937)

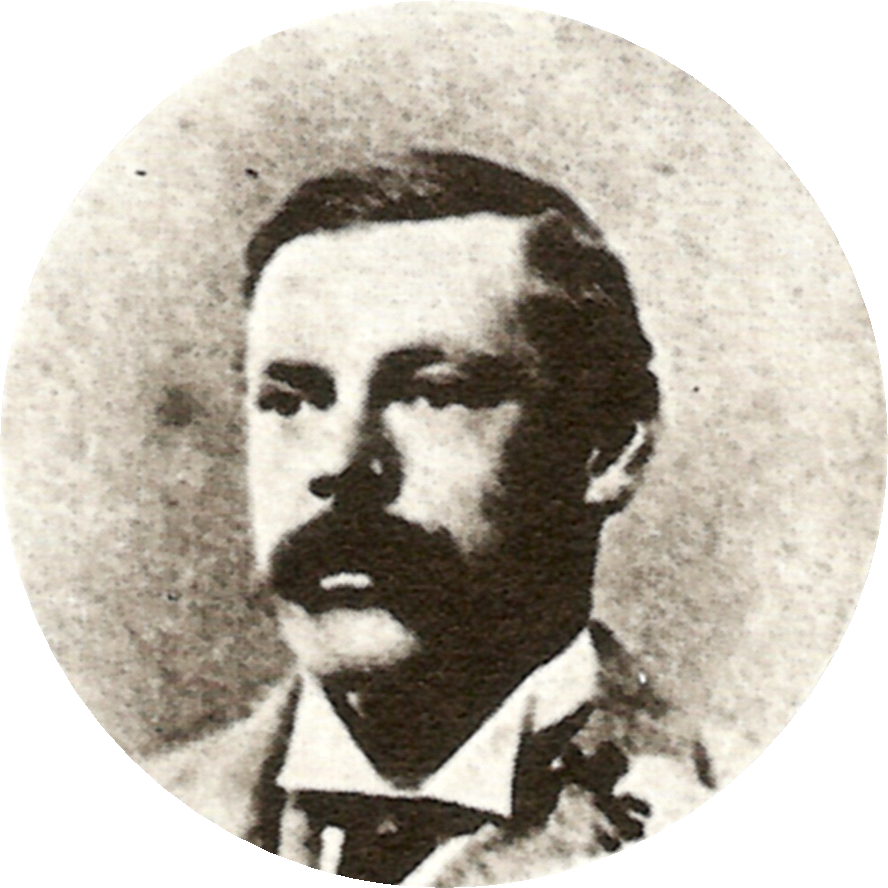
- Bill Roe circa 1899

Personal information
- Full name: William Nichols Roe
- Born: 21 March 1861; Closworth, Somerset, England
- Died: 11 October 1937 (aged 76); Marylebone, London, England
- Height: 5 ft 9 in (1.75 m)
- Batting: Right-handed
- Bowling: Right-arm off break; medium

Domestic team information
- Years: Team
- 1879–1899: Somerset
- 1880–1883: Cambridge University
- FC debut: 10 May 1880 Cambridge University v England XI
- Last FC: 22 May 1899 Somerset v Middlesex

Career statistics
Competition	First-class
Matches	83
Runs scored	2,690
Batting average	20.22
100s/50s	4/7
Top score	132
Balls bowled	2,208
Wickets	32
Bowling average	31.40
5 wickets in innings	0
10 wickets in match	0
Best bowling	3/17
Catches/stumpings	35/–
- Source: CricketArchive, 13 October 2010

William Nichols Roe (21 March 1861 – 11 October 1937) was an English first-class cricketer who played for Somerset County Cricket Club and Cambridge University in the late 19th century. A right-handed batsman who could play aggressively, but with a sound defensive method, Roe was considered one of Somerset's leading batsmen of the era. He played without merit for Cambridge, and only achieved his Blue during his final year at the university.

Roe gained cricketing fame in the summer of 1881, when he was drafted into the Emmanuel College Long Vacation Club cricket team for their match against a similar team from Gonville and Caius. After Caius had scored 100 runs, Roe batted for the rest of the game to reach 415 runs, the highest score in cricket at the time, just passing the previous total of 404 by Edward Tylecote. The match was reported across the contemporary press, though it was stressed that the quality of the opposition bowling was weak. Roe's first-class career never reached the heights it might have done; he was generally an inconsistent scorer, and scored just four hundreds in first-class cricket. His struggles were mirrored by his county side, Somerset, who flitted between first- and second-class cricket during his career. He played for the county from 1879 until 1899, and scored 2,690 runs in all first-class matches.

== Life and education career ==
William Nichols Roe was born on 21 March 1861 in Closworth, near Yeovil, in south Somerset. He attended the Clergy Orphan School in Canterbury before being admitted to Magdalene College, Cambridge in 1879. He graduated from Cambridge with a BA in 1883, and took a position as an schoolmaster at Elstree School, in Hertfordshire, from 1883 to 1900. He left Elstree in 1901 to set up Stanmore Park preparatory school with former England Test cricketer Vernon Royle. In 1892 he married Zoe Susanna Charlotte Jennings Crew Crew, and the pair had a son, also named William Nichols Roe, in 1898. Roe (senior) died on 11 October 1937, aged 76, in a nursing home in Marylebone, London following an operation.

== Cricket career ==
=== Early cricket ===
Roe had been a dominant cricketer during his time at school; in three years at the Clergy Orphan School, he took 292 wickets at a bowling average of eight, scored over 1,000 runs in 1878, and took all ten wickets in an innings against Chartham Asylum during his final year. In 1879, before going up to Cambridge University, Roe played four times for Somerset County Cricket Club. By his own recollections, he recounts his first experience of county cricket as being bowled by W. G. Grace "neck and crop".

In two trial matches for the Cambridge University Cricket Club, Roe impressed a little; in the freshman's match he was dismissed twice for single figure scores, and was little used as a bowler. In the trial match between the first team and the "next fifteen", he once again struggled in the first innings, but improved in the second, scoring 44 runs. He made his first-class cricket debut a few days after the second of those matches, appearing for the university side against an England XI. The university fared badly in the match, with no batsman reaching double figures in the first innings, and only four managing it in the second. Roe was dismissed for four and two, and did not play for the university again that year.

=== Highest score in cricket ===
In the second half of the 19th century, high scores in cricket matches were becoming more common as pitches improved, and in the summer of 1880, Roe gave a prelude to his record breaking of the following year when he hit 223 in a one-day match against his former school. In competitive, albeit second-class, county cricket, his scores remained significantly lower. Nor did he impress in the trial matches at Cambridge in his second year, resulting in him not appearing for the university that season.

In 1868, Edward Tylecote had become the first batsman to score a quadruple century (400 runs) in cricket, when he accumulated 404 not out in an internal match at Clifton College. W. G. Grace had got close to the total in 1876, but ran out of batting partners to finish on 400 not out. In the summer of 1881, Roe achieved his fame, by surpassing them both. In an intercollegiate match between the "long vacation clubs" of Gonville and Caius and Emmanuel, Roe was called upon as a guest player for Emmanuel, who had only managed to find nine players. Caius batted first, and were dismissed for 100 runs exactly, Roe taking half of their wickets and Charles Allcock the other half. Roe and Allcock then proceeded to open the batting for Emmanuel, finishing the day on 157 without the loss of either batsman. The next afternoon Roe reached his century early, and then after scoring 200 runs he could have been out three times, but each chance was missed. Against bowling described in the contemporary press as weak, he batted through the rest of the day to finish on 415 not out. The game was played on a ground with no boundaries, so he had to run each of his team's 708 runs, a distance of nearly eight miles. In all, he scored 1 six, 6 fives, 16 fours, 48 threes, 52 twos and 67 ones, but so fastidious was Roe, that when he came off the field at the close of play, he challenged the scorer for crediting him one run short; Roe had counted 416 runs. Roe's record was beaten by James Stewart Carrick in 1885, when the latter scored 419 not out for the West of Scotland against Priory Park, Chichester.

=== University and county cricketer ===
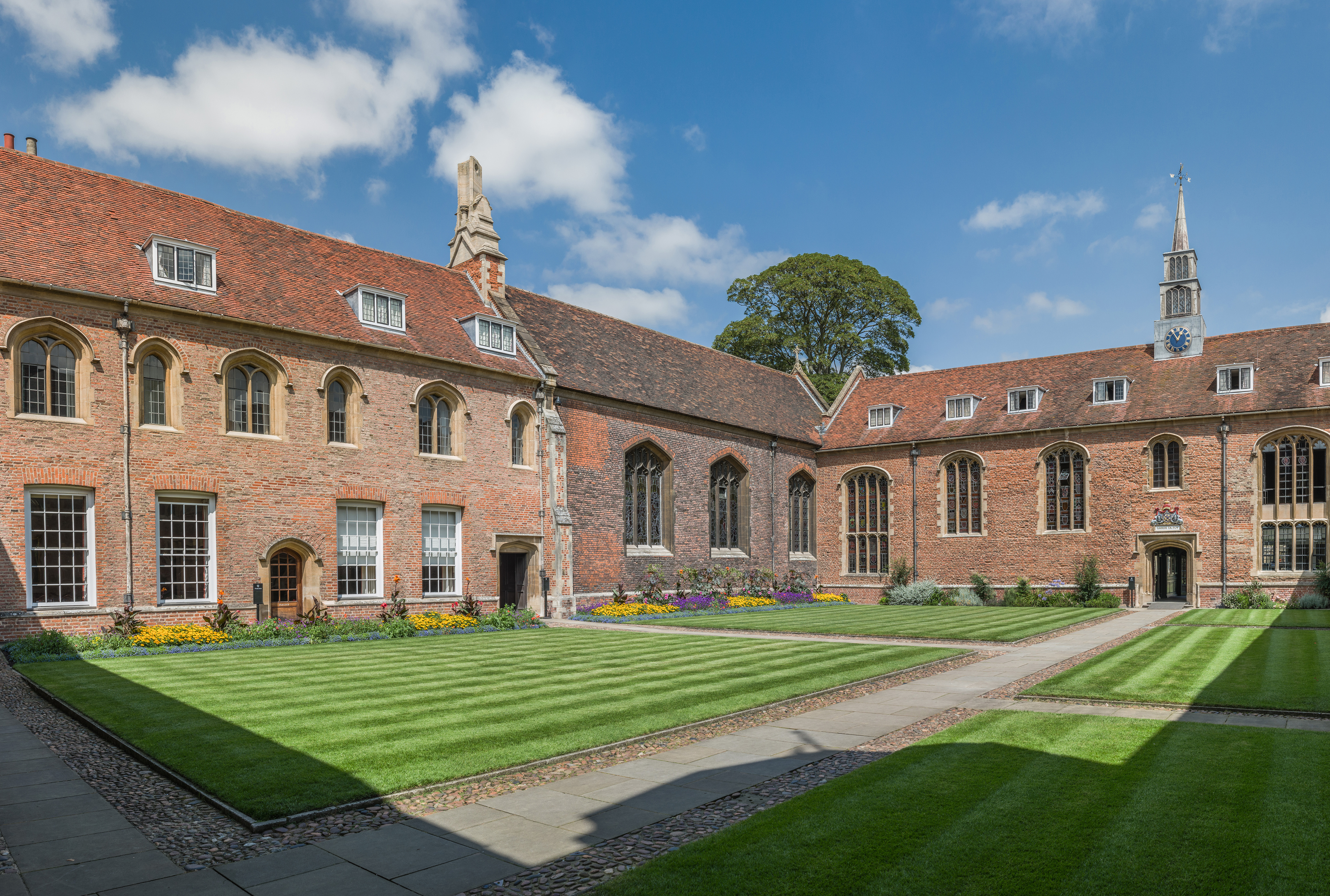
Magdalene College, Cambridge, which Roe attended in the 1880s.

In Haygarth's Cricket Scores and Biographies, Roe is described as a "fine, free hitter with excellent defence", who could also "bowl a very useful medium-paced ball". He got more of a go at Cambridge during his third year, playing five matches for the university side in 1882. Roe, who was known for his cricket tales, related a tale from one match that season in which the weather was so cold that catches were difficult to take. George Nash, the Lancashire professional, was missed off every ball of an over from Robert Ramsay. "C. T. Studd bowled the next ball, and a catch came to me at mid-off, the crowd began to boo, and I felt certain I should not make the catch, but by great good fortune the ball stuck!" Roe did not excel with bat or ball in any of his five university matches, and was not selected for the match against Oxford University at the end of the season. In his final year at Cambridge, Roe played seven times for the university, and achieved his Blue—the awarding of the Cambridge "colours" to sportsmen—by appearing in the University match against Oxford. He was out without scoring any runs in his only innings of the match, which Cambridge won by seven wickets. In all, during his time at Cambridge, Roe played 13 first-class matches for the university, scoring 246 runs at an average of 11.18, with just one score greater than 50. He also took ten wickets at 15.60.

Roe was rated as being one of Somerset better batsmen in their early years of first-class cricket, but his form in club cricket did not translate into good performances for the county. Between 1881 and 1882, Roe scored thirteen centuries, but none of those came in county cricket. In fact, it was not until 1884 that he made his first hundred in first-class cricket, scoring 132 against Hampshire. His work as a schoolmaster limited his availability for Somerset, and he only played three first-class matches for them in each of 1884 and 1885. After the 1885 season, Somerset were stripped of their first-class status for three reasons: they had not organised and played enough first-class fixtures during the season, their performances were not what was expected from a first-class county, and they had not succeeded in fielding a full side of eleven players in all their matches.

In 1886, Roe was only available for two of Somerset's matches, but the following year, he was one of the team's leading batsmen. He scored three fifties, and accumulated 272 runs in all for the county, second only to the club captain, Ted Sainsbury. He was less effective in 1888, averaging just 13 runs with a top-score of 27. Despite this, he was elected captain at the club's annual general meeting. Sainsbury, though a good cricketer, was unpopular with the club's committee as he did not live near to Taunton. Herbie Hewett was first proposed, but he declined to take the position. Roe was then elected unanimously to the position, with Hewett as his vice-captain. The club chairman noting that "considering what Mr Roe had done for the club his appointment would be a well-deserved compliment." Despite this, the 1889 season summaries refer to Hewett as being the captain, and at the annual meeting that year, it was noted that Hewett was re-elected as captain. Whether he was captain or not, Roe had a poor season. He played four of Somerset's eight matches, averaging 6.1 runs. Indeed, half his 43 runs that season came in one innings, when he scored 27. After the close of Somerset's formal county fixtures, Roe found some form, hitting 83 runs against the Gentlemen of Wiltshire, and 104 against the Gentlemen of Devon.

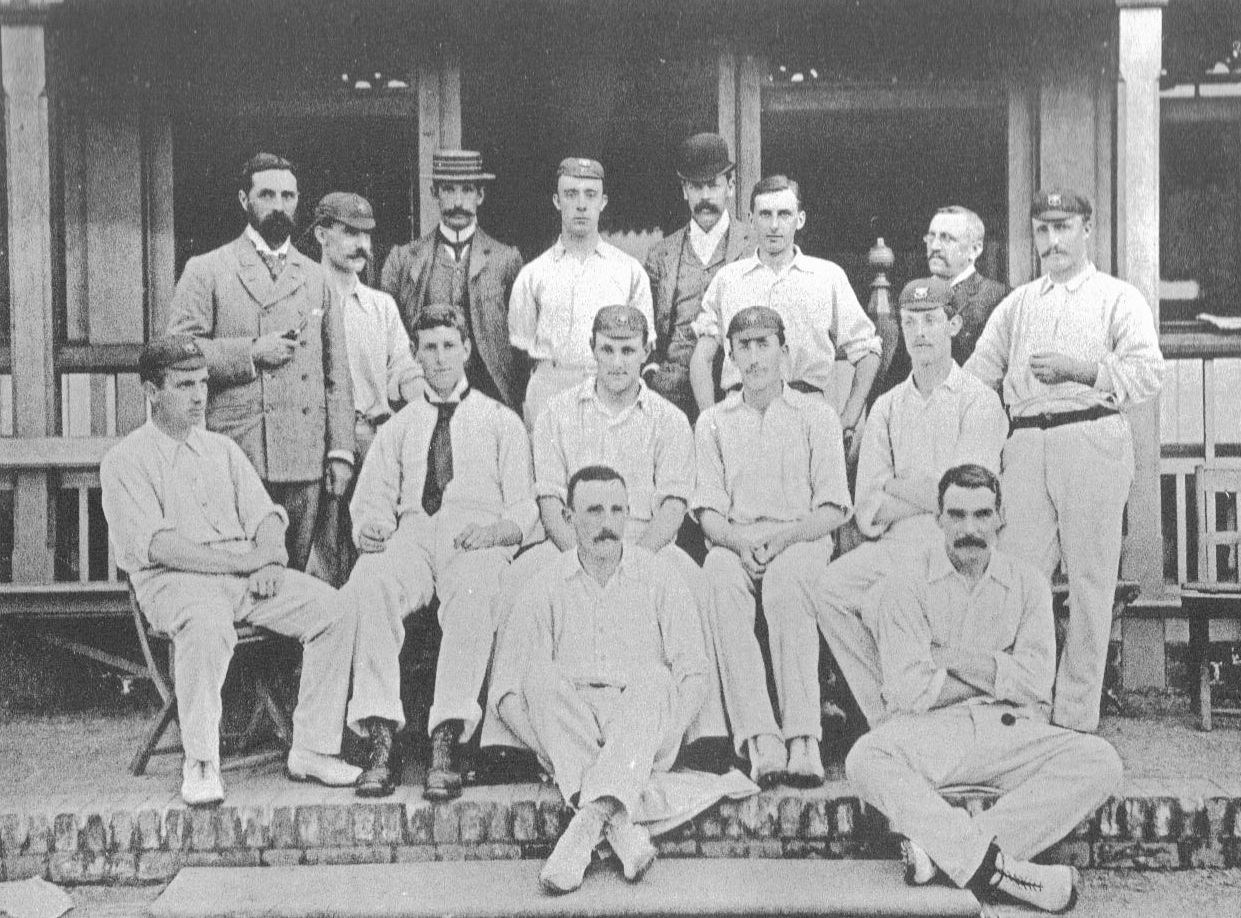
Roe, (back-row, middle, wearing a bowler hat) pictured with the Somerset team in 1892.

Somerset had an extraordinary season in 1890, going unbeaten in their thirteen fixtures; winning twelve and tying the other. Though he was described in the Taunton Courier's summary of the season as "one of Somerset's best bats", Roe was no longer relied upon so much by the team, which could now look to the batting of Hewett and Lionel Palairet. Roe finished the season sixth on the counties batting averages, having managed to play in eight of the county's fixtures. Due to their record in 1890, the county were admitted to the County Championship for 1891 after a unanimous vote, regaining their first-class status. He played infrequently, and without excelling himself, for Somerset over the subsequent few years. One of his highlights during this period was an innings against Gloucestershire in which he scored 75 runs to help Somerset set up a large victory. The Gloucestershire Chronicle praised him for the pace of his innings; he took an hour to patiently accrue his first 28 runs while the Somerset innings was in trouble, then added another 47 in just over half an hour.

During the 1896 season, Roe enjoyed his best run of scores for Somerset. Against Kent, he batted for most of Somerset's innings to score 93 runs without being dismissed, almost half of his team's total, to help Somerset recover from 12 for 5 to post 194. He added a further 45 runs in the second innings, but despite his efforts, Somerset lost by 145 runs. In his next match, Roe posted a low score in the first innings, but recorded his second century in first-class cricket in the second innings to help Somerset secure a draw. He scored 106 runs, including six boundaries. Against Sussex in the next game, Roe scored an unbeaten 85, but was overshadowed by scores of 154 and 156 by Richard and Lionel Palairet, and 191 by Sussex's Ernest Killick. Roe finished the season fourth in the national batting averages, the highest of any Somerset player, his 434 runs coming at an average of 43.4.

Each of Somerset's principal batsmen struggled in 1897; both Palairet brothers, Sammy Woods and Roe himself. Roe only passed 50 once that season, and accumulated less than half as many runs as in the previous year, scoring 192 at an average of 21.33. As a result of their batsmen's poor form, Somerset finished the season 11th (of 14) in the County Championship. The next year, Somerset finished bottom of the table, though their batting had mostly improved. Roe was fourth in the team's averages, having scored 265 runs at an average of 33.12. In fact, of his total, 212 of those runs came in two innings. He scored a cautious century against Sussex at the start of August, and then a more attacking one at the end of the month against Surrey. Roe's performances led the Bath Chronicle to note in their season review that "there was plenty of cricket still left in him." Despite this assertion, Roe played only once more for Somerset, as one of four Somerset batsmen to be dismissed without scoring in both innings of Somerset's 1899 contest against Middlesex.

In all, Roe played 83 first-class matches, alongside a significant number of second-class county matches for Somerset. In first-class cricket he scored 2,690 runs, including four centuries, at an average of 20.22. He also took 32 wickets with his medium pace and spin bowling, and was well-regarded as a fielder, having taken 35 catches.

== Bibliography ==
- Ashley-Cooper, F. S.; Haygarth, Arthur (2004) [1925]. M. C. C. Cricket Scores and Biographies. Vol. XV. Little Eversden, Cambridgeshire: Roger Heavens. ISBN 1-900592-44-4.
- Foot, David. Sunshine, Sixes and Cider: The History of Somerset Cricket (1986 ed.). Newton Abbot, Devon: David & Charles. ISBN 0-7153-8890-8.
- Hill, Stephen (2016). Somerset Cricketers 1882 – 1914. Wellington, Somerset: Halsgrove. ISBN 978-0-85704-291-0.
