= Charles Winter (cricketer, born 1866) =

English cricketer

Personal information
- Full name: Charles Edgar Winter
- Born: 9 October 1865 (Note: CricketArchive list his birth year as 1865, ESPNcricinfo as 1866, Times death notice gives age as 88 at time of death which supports 1865); Bermondsey, London, England
- Died: 3 April 1954 (aged 88); Northwood, Middlesex, England
- Batting: Right-handed
- Bowling: Right-arm fast
- Role: Bowler
- Relatives: Charles A Winter (son)

Domestic team information
- Years: Team
- 1881–1895: Somerset
- FC debut: 24 July 1882 Somerset v Lancashire
- Last FC: 30 May 1895 Somerset v Hampshire

Career statistics
Competition	First-class
Matches	25
Runs scored	319
Batting average	8.62
100s/50s	0/1
Top score	62
Balls bowled	2,260
Wickets	50
Bowling average	22.14
5 wickets in innings	0
10 wickets in match	0
Best bowling	4/20
Catches/stumpings	11/–
- Source: CricketArchive, 11 May 2010

Charles Edgar Winter (9 October 1865 – 3 April 1954) was an English cricketer who played 25 first-class matches for Somerset County Cricket Club between 1882 and 1895. A right-arm fast bowler, he claimed 50 wickets for the county at a Bowling average of 22.14. His highest score was 62, the only occasion on which he made a half-century.

== Cricket career ==
Winter played his first match for Somerset in 1879 aged just 13 in a match against Wells Cricket Club. His next matches for the then second-class county came in 1881 when he claimed three wickets against the Marylebone Cricket Club (MCC), and five against Hampshire. Somerset were awarded first-class status in 1882, and it was in this season that Winter made his debut first-class appearance, playing for the county against Hampshire. By the time of his first-class debut, Winter was still only aged 16, making him among the youngest debutants to have played first-class cricket for Somerset. Coming on to bowl at the first change of bowling, Winter claimed a wicket in his first innings, with the Hampshire captain Russell Bencraft being caught off his bowling. He was dismissed for six in both of Somerset's innings. In his second match, against the MCC, Winter claimed four wickets for 49 runs in the second-innings, achieving a return that would remain his best until 1885. It was another match against Hampshire in which Winter improved his bowling figures, taking four wickets for 20 runs. Playing the same opposition later that season, Somerset had only travelled to Southampton for the match with nine players. After scoring 22 in the first-innings, Winter was promoted to open the second for Somerset, and scored his highest total, and only half-century, making 62 runs.

His son, also named Charles Winter, subsequently also played for Somerset.

== Bibliography ==
- Foot, David (1986). Sunshine, Sixes and Cider: The History of Somerset Cricket (1986 ed.). David & Charles. ISBN 0-7153-8890-8.
