= Eric Hill (cricketer) =

English cricketer and journalist

Personal information
- Born: 9 July 1923; Taunton, Somerset, England
- Died: 27 July 2010 (aged 87); Williton, Somerset, England
- Batting: Right-handed
- Role: Opening batsman

Domestic team information
- Years: Team
- 1947–1951: Somerset
- FC debut: 10 May 1947 Somerset v Middlesex
- Last FC: 10 August 1951 Somerset v Northamptonshire

Career statistics
Competition	First-class
Matches	72
Runs scored	2,118
Batting average	15.92
100s/50s	0/6
Top score	85
Balls bowled	54
Wickets	1
Bowling average	55.00
5 wickets in innings	0
10 wickets in match	0
Best bowling	1/25
Catches/stumpings	30/–
- Source: CricketArchive, 28 July 2010

Eric Hill DFC, DFM (9 July 1923 – 27 July 2010) was an English first-class cricketer who played for Somerset County Cricket Club as an opening batsman between 1947 and 1951, later serving as captain of the second team, a long-serving committeeman for the county, and as a journalist covering cricket for the local newspaper, the Somerset County Gazette, and correspondent for The Daily Telegraph. In the Second World War, he was a navigator on reconnaissance missions for the Royal Air Force, and was decorated for his courage.

== Background ==
Hill was born at Taunton, where his parents ran a sweetshop. He was educated at Taunton School, where he was a day boy, and where one of his contemporaries, though a boarder, was the future cricket writer Alan Gibson. In a profile of Hill written in 1983, Gibson wrote: "Although we were much of an age, he was about twice my size." Hill played soccer and cricket for the school: "[He] had a passion for cricket, a quiet but deep passion, and his ambition was to play for Somerset," Gibson wrote.

== War service ==
Hill volunteered to join the RAF in 1941, and trained as a navigator. He joined No. 544 Squadron in March 1944, and flew 53 sorties in a de Havilland Mosquito with Frank Dodd, many involving long-range photo reconnaissance in the Arctic seas north and east of Scotland, and later over Germany and the Baltic Sea, and also flying diplomatic mail to Winston Churchill at conferences in Moscow, Athens and Yalta.

They flew a mission to the Lofoten Islands on 9 July 1944, searching the coastal shipping lanes and photographing the mainland town of Bodø. Bad weather in northern Scotland on their return prevented a landing, and they finally landed at RAF Leuchars with just 10 gallons left in the fuel tanks. On 12 July, they again flew, via a refuelling stop at RAF Sumburgh in the Shetland Islands, to the Lofoten Islands, and then on to Altenfjord, to search for German surface vessels, flying 750 miles to the Norwegian coast above thick cloud. The top cover of their aeroplane blew off as they descended towards the fjord to make their photography run, subjecting the crew to freezing temperatures for the remainder of the flight. They made a photographic run over the targets they found, including the Tirpitz. They lost their codebooks through the open hatch, so were unable to obtain radio assistance on the way back. They flew 2,300 miles in a mission that lasted nearly 8 hours, landing at RAF Wick, but were immediately refuelled and sent on to Leuchars for the photographs to be developed. The intelligence brought by these missions were of crucial importance: Flight Lieutenant (later Air Vice Marshal) Dodd was awarded an immediate Distinguished Service Order and Flight Sergeant Hill an immediate Distinguished Flying Medal. The citations were gazetted on 8 September and read:

Air Ministry, 8th September, 1944.

The KING has been graciously pleased, to approve the following awards in recognition of gallantry displayed in flying operations against the enemy: —

Distinguished Service Order.

Flight Lieutenant Frank Leslie DODD, A.F.C. (89766), R.A.F.V.R., 544 Sqn.

Distinguished Flying Medal.

1339737 Flight Sergeant Eric HILL, R.A.F.V.R., 544 Sqn.

As pilot and observer respectively this officer and airman have completed many sorties and have displayed a high standard of skill and devotion to duty. In July, 1944, they completed a reconnaissance of many hours duration in the face of extremely adverse weather. During the operation and, although much anti-aircraft fire was directed at their aircraft, they obtained valuable information. Three days later Flight Lieutenant Dodd and Flight Sergeant Hill successfully completed another notable reconnaissance, again securing valuable information. This officer and airman have displayed courage and fortitude of a high order.

After a reconnaissance flight to Magdeburg on 16 September, they were chased by two Me 262s, but eluded them by making a series of sharp turns that the faster jet-powered German aircraft could not match, before ducking into cloud to escape. On 18 September, Hill was commissioned as a pilot officer.

They flew the RAF's last reconnaissance operation to the northern Arctic on 22 March 1945, to photograph Tirpitz lying capsized and partially submerged on the seabed in the bay of Håkøybotn near Tromsø, having been attacked by RAF bombers in Operation Catechism on 12 November 1944. They flew for more than 10 hours, covering more than 3,000 miles, reputedly the longest photographic reconnaissance flight of the whole war.

Hill (now a flying officer) and Dodd (now an acting squadron leader) were, on 27 July 1945, both awarded the Distinguished Flying Cross for their service. Hill was demobbed as a flight lieutenant.

== Cricket career ==
Hill joined Somerset in 1947. As a cricketer, Hill was a tall, thin, dark-haired, bespectacled right-handed batsman who played fairly regularly as Harold Gimblett's opening partner in three seasons, 1948, 1949 and 1951. He played five matches batting in the lower order in the 1947 season, but was promoted to open the innings in 1948 after Frank Lee retired at the end of the 1947 season. In 22 matches that season, he made 731 runs at an average of 17.40. Three scores of more than 50 in the season included Hill's career highest of 85, made against Northamptonshire at Kettering.

Hill lost his place in the side towards the end of the season when Somerset's amateur contingent was more readily available, but resumed his opening partnership with Gimblett at the start of the 1949 season, with similar results: an aggregate of 718 runs at an average of 18.41, and a regular place in the side until the end of July. Somerset's hopes for Hill were shown by the award of his county cap: "It was hoped that Hill would develop into an ideal partner for Gimblett, but after being awarded his county cap for consistent displays he fell away to a surprising degree," Wisden reported. He was out of form in 1950 as well, playing only six matches and making only 67 runs, and Les Angell emerged from club cricket in Bath for Lansdown as a more regular opening partner for Gimblett.

Angell was still the more regular opening partner for Gimblett in 1951, but Hill also played in more than half of Somerset's matches, opening when Angell was dropped and when Gimblett took a mid-season break, but otherwise batting at No 3 or No 6 in a somewhat mobile Somerset batting line-up. He made only 474 runs at an average of 14.36. His only score of more than 50 was 66, made in the match against Nottinghamshire at Trent Bridge.

He played in 72 first-class matches for Somerset, with a batting average of 15.92 from his 138 innings, including 6 half-centuries.

== Later career ==
Hill did not play for Somerset after the 1951 season, but remained intimately connected with the county side as a reporter for the County Gazette and on the club's committees. In 1953, after the side had finished at the bottom of the County Championship for two consecutive seasons and with the threat that it might go out of business, he and two other journalists organised a special meeting of the club which called for wholesale changes in the organisation and the committee. Their motions were defeated, but the three were recruited to the committee and Hill was made captain of the second eleven. Somerset embarked on a process of recruitment of cricketers from other counties and from overseas that transformed its fortunes by the end of the 1950s. He was also a freelance sports correspondent for The Daily Telegraph, wrote an article for the first-ever edition of The Sunday Telegraph, and travelled to South Africa, Australia and New Zealand to report on England's overseas Test matches.

Hill remained as a committeeman and as a reporter on Somerset cricket for more than 40 years. He also contributed the notes on Somerset matches to Wisden for many years. His former school-friend and fellow reporter Alan Gibson wrote in 1983: "He rules over the tatty old press-box at Taunton with what purports to be an iron glove, though there is a velvet hand within it. He will growl about 'you cowboys' to visitors, especially when they arrive late and want to borrow his scorecard, but having been suitably humbled they get their information and their telephone calls in the end... He rightly dislikes a stream of dirty stories in a press-box... but I have noticed he is becoming increasingly voluble himself. Last season I heard him mutter 'Good shot' twice in one over."

He died at Williton Hospital in Somerset. He was survived by his wife, Dorothy.
