= Laurie Hawkins =

English cricketer (1907–2003)

Personal information
- Full name: Laurence Cyril Hawkins
- Born: 15 May 1907; Solihull, Warwickshire, England
- Died: 4 October 2003 (aged 96); Padstow, Cornwall, England
- Batting: Right-handed
- Bowling: Right-arm leg-break
- Role: All-rounder

Domestic team information
- Years: Team
- 1928–1937: Somerset
- FC debut: 18 July 1928 Somerset v Nottinghamshire
- Last FC: 6 August 1937 Somerset v Middlesex

Career statistics
| Competition | First-class |
|---|---|
| Matches | 46 |
| Runs scored | 1,252 |
| Batting average | 17.15 |
| 100s/50s | 0/5 |
| Top score | 96 |
| Balls bowled | 1,417 |
| Wickets | 22 |
| Bowling average | 48.50 |
| 5 wickets in innings | 0 |
| 10 wickets in match | 0 |
| Best bowling | 4/39 |
| Catches/stumpings | 23/– |
- Source: CricketArchive, 29 May 2010

Laurence Cyril Hawkins (15 May 1907 – 4 October 2003) played first-class cricket for Somerset in 46 matches between 1928 and 1937. He was born in Solihull, Warwickshire, and died at Padstow, Cornwall.

Hawkins was a middle or lower order batsman and an occasional right-arm leg-spin bowler who was a long-standing player for Weston-super-Mare Cricket Club and turned out as an amateur for Somerset in a few games every season for 10 years. In 1934, he appeared in 12 matches, but in no other season was he picked for more than seven games.

Hawkins made a promising start to county cricket, hitting 65 in his first innings in the match against Nottinghamshire at Taunton in 1928 and sharing in a ninth wicket stand of 89 in 90 minutes with Wally Luckes. But in 17 other matches in that and the following three seasons he did not pass 50 in any innings.

It was against Nottinghamshire again that Hawkins played his next significant innings: in the 1932 match, batting at No 9, he made an unbeaten 63 and shared a last-wicket partnership of 67 with Bill Andrews. And yet again, Nottinghamshire were the opposition when Hawkins began the 1934 season with an innings of 82: Hawkins scored more than half of Somerset's runs and came in after six wickets had gone for just 31 runs to make what was then his highest score. This innings propelled Hawkins temporarily up the Somerset batting to a middle-order position, and it was from there, less than three weeks later, that he made his highest first-class score, 96 against Middlesex at Lord's, sharing a seventh wicket stand of 125 with Jack White that enabled Somerset to save a game where they had trailed by 207 on the first innings.

Hawkins' absence, rather than his presence, produced a highlight of the 1935 season. As Wisden put it in his obituary in the 2004 edition: "He was injured for the game against Essex at Frome, which led to the call-up of 20-year-old Harold Gimblett and the most famous of all debut innings." And Hawkins himself had one final good match for Somerset in 1936, scoring 79 and 43 not out against the Indians and taking four wickets for 39 runs, his best bowling figures in first-class cricket and including a spell of four wickets for 10 runs. He did not play for Somerset after the 1937 season.
