= NSCL =

NSCL may stand for:

- National Superconducting Cyclotron Laboratory
- National Senior Classical League
- North Somerset Cricket League
