= Harold Gimblett =

English cricketer (1914–1978)

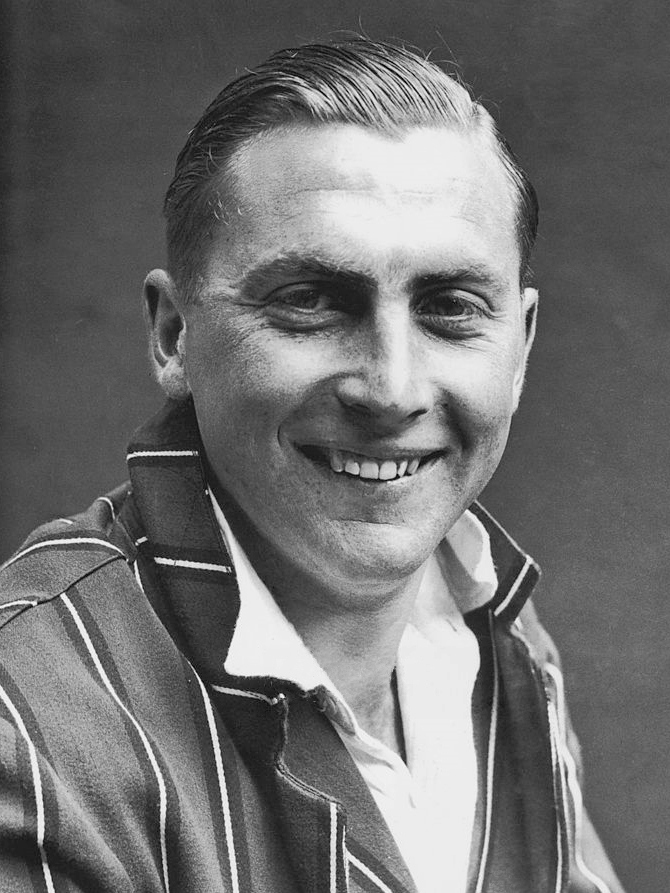
- Gimblett in 1936

Personal information
- Full name: Harold Gimblett
- Born: 19 October 1914; Bicknoller, Somerset, England
- Died: 30 March 1978 (aged 63); Verwood, Dorset, England
- Batting: Right-handed
- Bowling: Right-arm medium
- Role: Batsman

International information
- National side: England
- Test debut (cap 290): 27 June 1936 v India
- Last Test: 24 June 1939 v West Indies

Domestic team information
- Years: Team
- 1935–1954: Somerset

Career statistics
Competition	Test	First-class
Matches	3	368
Runs scored	129	23,007
Batting average	32.25	36.17
100s/50s	0/1	50/122
Top score	67*	310
Balls bowled	0	3,949
Wickets	–	41
Bowling average	–	51.80
5 wickets in innings	–	0
10 wickets in match	–	0
Best bowling	–/–	4/10
Catches/stumpings	1/–	247/1
- Source: Cricinfo, 31 August 2009

Harold Gimblett (19 October 1914 – 30 March 1978) was a cricketer who played for Somerset and England. He was known for his fast scoring as an opening batsman and for the much-repeated story of his debut. In a book first published in 1982, the cricket writer and Somerset historian David Foot wrote: "Harold Gimblett is the greatest batsman Somerset has ever produced." Gimblett is a member of the Gimblett family, an Anglo-French family who arrived in Britain in the early 18th century from Metz. The family spread out over Britain, with branches located in Somerset, Scotland, and South Wales. There are variations of the spelling of the name, including Gimlet, Gimlette, and Gimblette.

Gimblett scored at a fast rate throughout his career, and hit 265 sixes – "surely a record for a regular opening batsman", wrote Eric Hill, his postwar opening partner and thereafter a long-time journalist watcher of Somerset. He appeared, however, in only three Tests, none of them against Australia, and he left first-class cricket abruptly, suffering from mental health problems that would remain with him to the end of his life.

== Background ==
Harold Gimblett was born at Bicknoller in the Quantock Hills in west Somerset, where his family had been farmers since the 15th century. He was the youngest of three brothers and was educated at the local school at Williton and then at the fee-paying West Buckland School just over the border in Devon.

He played cricket successfully at school and for Watchet Cricket Club. In 1931, he left school; in August of that year, he made the first of his significant innings. In the match between Watchet and Wellington Cricket Club, he came to the wicket with Watchet on 37 for seven, chasing a total of 160. With another teenage batsman, Allan Pearse, Gimblett hit off the runs, making 91 himself. A year later, he was co-opted into the Somerset Stragglers team, a peripatetic amateur team which played matches across south west England, composed of former public school players of varying abilities, some of whom were the amateurs who formed a large contingent of Somerset county players up to the Second World War. In his first match for the Stragglers team, against Wellington School, he made 142 in 75 minutes.

Gimblett briefly moved to London to work, but city life was not to his taste and he returned home, resuming cricket for the Watchet club. One of the patrons of Watchet cricket, the town tailor W. G. Penny, who was also prominent in Somerset County Cricket Club, recommended him for a trial with the county, though there appears to have been some reservations over his temperament and his impetuous batting. There is also, in the same source, some suggestion that Gimblett himself was reluctant to test himself against top-class cricketers.

Even so, at the start of the 1935 season, Gimblett was invited to go to Taunton for a two-week trial with the county. The trial seems not to have been a success, but it led directly to the sensation that was Gimblett's first-class cricket debut.

== First-class debut ==
Gimblett's entry into first-class cricket in May 1935 was instant legend. Wisden, in its obituary of him in 1979, wrote: "The start of his career was so sensational that any novelist attributing it to his hero would have discredited the book."

Having a two-week trial with Somerset, Gimblett had been told, before the period was over, that he had no future as a first-class cricketer. Accounts vary as to how this decision was reached. Gimblett himself, quoted in David Foot's biography, which relies heavily on material taped by Gimblett in the years immediately before his death, said he was told by the county secretary and former captain, John Daniell: "You may as well finish the week. We'll pay you 35 shillings and your bus fare. Afraid you're just not good enough." Daniell's son, quoted in the same book, said that the Somerset professional players had advised against taking Gimblett on to the county staff: "They used to tell my father they thought Harold was far too impulsive." A further factor may have been the almost permanent financial crisis that surrounded Somerset: the county club was probably not able to afford another professional player.

On the final Friday of Gimblett's trial, Somerset found themselves a player short for the match that started the following day against Essex at Frome when the amateur Laurie Hawkins reported in sick. Gimblett was told to get himself to Frome: Daniell arranged for the wicketkeeper Wally Luckes, who had a car, to pick him up from Bridgwater. Gimblett missed the bus from Taunton, and hitched a lift in a lorry. Somerset won the toss and chose to bat: three batsmen were out for 35, and at lunch the score was 105 for five. Soon after lunch, Dickie Burrough was out and Gimblett came to the wicket with Somerset six wickets down for 107 runs, joining Arthur Wellard.

Gimblett's first run came off his third ball, and shortly afterwards he was hitting the leg-break and googly bowler Peter Smith for 15 in an over. He raced to his 50 in just 28 minutes, off 33 balls, reaching it with a six. Wellard, unusually for him, was outpaced and was out, followed swiftly by Luckes, but Gimblett was joined by Bill Andrews, who also hit powerfully. Gimblett's century came in just 63 minutes, which proved to be the fastest century of the season, and it was made out of 130 runs added while he had been at the wicket. He finished with 123 out of 175 in 80 minutes, with three sixes and 17 fours. Somerset won the match with an innings to spare.

The innings turned Gimblett into an instant celebrity. Foot's biography records that Fleet Street writers and photographers descended on the Gimblett farm at Bicknoller; the former cricketer Jack Hobbs congratulated Gimblett in his newspaper column, but also warned that such a start would be difficult to sustain.

So it proved. Gimblett retained his place for the next match, against Middlesex at Lord's, only because of another injury to a regular player, and though he top-scored with 53 in the second innings (still batting at No 8), he himself was injured and missed the next month. Returning to the side in mid-season, he played with little success, though he took a few wickets with his medium-pace, including four wickets for just 10 runs against Gloucestershire at Bath, which would remain his best first-class bowling performance. Wisden Cricketers' Almanack summed up his first first-class season in its 1936 edition, noting that he "failed to maintain his early form". It went on: "Almost entirely a forward player, he appeared to pay little heed to defence, and in the end lack of experience contributed to his undoing. Still, shrewd observers maintain that he possesses distinct possibilities, and with further opportunities he may become more than a useful member of the side."

== Test cricketer ==
That Wisden assessment was made to look unduly modest within weeks of the start of the 1936 season. Regular opening batsman Jack Lee had been allowed to leave Somerset to become coach at Mill Hill School, and Gimblett was promoted to open the innings against the Indians in Somerset's first match of the season. He made 103 and then an unbeaten 46 as Somerset won the match by nine wickets after making the Indians follow on. In the very next match against Lancashire at Old Trafford, he did even better with 93 in the first innings and an unbeaten 160 in the second, when he held on with the Somerset tail-enders to deny Lancashire victory. That gave him fleetingly a season's batting average of more than 200, and he followed that up with a third century a week later against the admittedly weak Northamptonshire side. This form earned Gimblett selection for the Test trial match for the series against the Indian team, a match between North and South at Lord's that featured a mix of established Test players and up-and-coming young players. Gimblett failed in the match, scoring just four runs in his only innings. He was nonetheless selected for the England team for the first Test of the 1936 series in an experimental opening partnership with Arthur Mitchell of Yorkshire.

Gimblett's first Test appearance was the most successful of his short Test career. In a low-scoring match in which the Indian team led England by 13 on the first innings, it was Gimblett's top-scoring 67 not out in the second innings that brought victory to his side. England had been set 107 to win, but with a damp pitch and uncertain weather, "the task could not be regarded as an easy one," Wisden wrote. It went on: "As Gimblett got the pace of the wicket, he developed sound hitting powers and hooked superbly." In partnership with Maurice Turnbull, who made 37, Gimblett hit off the runs in 100 minutes, playing "with much skill and verve".

Gimblett's status as one of the coming men of English cricket was confirmed by his selection on the Players' side for the Gentlemen v Players match at Lord's, one of the centrepieces of the English cricket season. He was not a success, making just three and one. But he retained his place in the England team for the second Test at Old Trafford, opening this time with the Kent batsman Arthur Fagg, who was making his Test debut. This time, Gimblett failed, making just nine in England's single innings. The carrot at the end of the 1936 season was selection for the MCC team to tour Australia and New Zealand in the 1936–37 season; the side was picked in early August, and Gimblett was not named in it, the young opening batsmen selected being Fagg and Charles Barnett, who replaced Gimblett for the third and final Test match against India. In fact, Gimblett's form for the second half of the 1936 season was patchy, and from the high of averaging 200 with the bat in May he ended up at the end of the season with an aggregate of 1608 runs at an average of 32.81, half a dozen runs per innings less than both Fagg and Barnett. Wisden noted that he had achieved "nothing of note" in important matches apart from his "dashing" 67 in his first Test. It went on: "As his slip-fielding fell rather below international standard, it became abundantly clear that he could not yet be labelled an England player." And it repeated criticism of a year before about lack of discretion: "Using the horizontal bat with a great amount of freedom, he frequently fell, through lack of discrimination in selecting the right ball to hit, to catches on the leg-side. Still, most of his faults were due to inexperience, and as he is only 22 years of age his career will be watched with interest beyond the confines of his own county."

David Foot's biography of Gimblett indicates that this 1936 season, although one of his most successful, also showed early signs of the illness that was to afflict him later. He reacted badly to being criticised for dropping an easy catch in the Old Trafford Test, and when he himself was dropped from the team for the final Test, he responded with relief: "'Thank goodness that's over,' he said to anyone within earshot." Foot wrote: "The Lord's and Old Trafford Tests became painful rather than treasured memories; he pleaded silently that he would not ever be selected again."

In contrast to the drama of 1936, the 1937 and 1938 seasons were quiet ones for Gimblett. Other batsmen of his own age, such as Leonard Hutton, moved ahead of him in the Test pecking order, and he was at times not fully fit. He completed 1000 runs easily in both seasons and there were occasional innings of brilliance: at Wells in 1937, he made 141 in 150 minutes with nine sixes and 16 fours against Hampshire. In 1938, Wisden noted that he was, at times, more defensive than he had been previously, and in run-getting he was overshadowed by his opening partner, Frank Lee, who scored more than 2,000 runs in the season. For some matches in 1938, Gimblett batted at No 4, Bertie Buse opening with Lee.

Gimblett had another of his "purple patches" early in the 1939 season, which was his most successful so far. He scored 905 runs in the first seven Somerset matches, including five centuries in successive matches. Wisden noted, though, that he now revealed "less of the electrifying methods that first brought him to the front". The return to form brought him back into Test contention. He was picked for the first Test against West Indies at Lord's, opening with Hutton and making 22 and 20. In the second innings, with England needing fast runs for victory, he hit the first two balls bowled by fast bowler Leslie Hylton for four and six. He did not retain his place in the Test team, but played in the Gentlemen v Players match at Lord's, making 52 in the Players' first innings. In the season as a whole, he made 1922 runs at an average of 40.89.

== War service ==
Gimblett volunteered for the Royal Air Force for the Second World War, but was allocated instead to the Fire Service, and saw duty in badly bombed cities such as Plymouth and Bristol.

== Postwar county stalwart ==
In the eight seasons after the Second World War Gimblett was the mainstay of the Somerset batting. Without taming his aggressive instincts, he had become more judicious in his shot selection, and though he remained until the end of his career likely to smash the first ball of a match for six, he also took on the role of senior batsman in a Somerset side that was usually weak in batting. In the 1946 season, Somerset's best for more than 50 years, he made 1947 runs at an average of 49.92 runs per innings, the highest seasonal average of his career. There were seven centuries, the most of any season, and they included 231 against Middlesex at Taunton, his first double century and part of what Wisden termed a "merciless onslaught" by the Somerset batsmen.

The return in 1947 was lower, but in 1948, with the Somerset batting seeming ever more dependent on him for runs, he responded with all of the four centuries scored by the team in the summer, and one of them was his own highest score and the highest innings made to that stage by a Somerset batsman: 310 against Sussex at Eastbourne. The previous Somerset record had been 292, set by the late Victorian era amateur Lionel Palairet. Gimblett told his biographer David Foot, on the tapes that form the backbone of the biography, that he had said on the pitch at Eastbourne to Sussex player James Langridge: "Well, that's got rid of one amateur's name in our county's record books." Gimblett went on to say that a collection had been proposed to mark the feat, but that Somerset's secretary had been dismissive of the idea. "I think that was when I first decided that my career with Somerset was going to end. I was deeply hurt," he said.

But it didn't end quite yet. In 1949, Gimblett passed 2000 runs for the season for the first time in his career, his 2093 in the season being a new record for Somerset at the time. He also hit two centuries in a match for the first time in his career, with 115 and an unbeaten 127 in the game against Hampshire at Taunton. "The feeling that if he got out almost all was over never affected his play," Wisden commented of his efforts across the season.

The pattern was repeated in 1950, but with an odd mid-season twist. The England Test side was being outplayed by the West Indies, and specifically by two previously unknown spin bowlers, Sonny Ramadhin and Alf Valentine. After a bad defeat in the second Test at Lord's, the England selectors sent for Gimblett for the third match at Trent Bridge with the apparent aim of having him hit the two spinners out of their rhythm. It would have been Gimblett's first Test for 11 years and the move, according to Foot, was highly popular, and not just in Somerset. But just before the match, Gimblett developed a large boil, a "carbuncle", on the back of his neck. He was dosed with penicillin and travelled to Nottingham. "A nation's sporting press meticulously documented the carbuncle's throb-rate," Foot writes. It was to no avail: Gimblett withdrew from the match, and was not picked again.

At the end of the 1950 English season, however, he ventured abroad for the first time, taking part in a Commonwealth tour of India and Sri Lanka and opening the batting in all five of the representative games. He had some success on the tour, scoring one century, the only one of the 50 centuries in his career not to be made for Somerset. Perhaps more typically, he was homesick and unhappy: "At first I wondered whether I'd picked up a bug. But it was purely mental," he said in a tape transcribed in his biography. Lighter by about 12 kg, he struggled for runs more than usually in the 1951 season, and took a long break from cricket in July, returning to some form afterwards.

Somerset awarded Gimblett a benefit match in 1952, though perhaps typically he grumbled that it was not the potentially lucrative bank holiday local derby match with Gloucestershire but the game with Northamptonshire at Glastonbury that he was allocated. Gimblett made a century in that match and had, in terms of run aggregate, his best-ever season in 1952. He scored 2134 runs in all matches, at an average of 39.51. Against Derbyshire at Taunton, he became the first Somerset player to hit two centuries in a match twice, scoring 146 and 116 in a drawn game.

If 1952 was a good season for Gimblett, then it was a poor one for his team. After several years in which the side had defied predictions and finished mid-table in the County Championship, Somerset fell to bottom place in 1952, and stayed there for four years. But Gimblett's own performance drew one of the game's accolades: in the 1953 edition of Wisden, he was named one of the Five Cricketers of the Year, alongside Tom Graveney, David Sheppard, Stuart Surridge and Fred Trueman.

The 1953 season, with 19 Championship defeats, was even worse than 1952: Gimblett's own performance was maintained, though three matches missed through injury meant his aggregate fell a little, but he "seldom received adequate support from his colleagues", wrote Wisden. The unbeaten 167 he made against Northamptonshire at Taunton was the 50th century of his first-class career. At the end of the 1953 season he played festival cricket at Hastings and Kingston and Wisden's notes on Somerset in 1954 announced that he had "accepted a five-year contract to remain with the club".

== Health problems and later career ==
Throughout his life, Gimblett's personality was inclined to be morose and depressive, and there is evidence from across his cricket career of a gulf between his entertaining cricket style and his own personal negativism. Alan Gibson, the cricket writer who himself suffered from bouts of mental illness, wrote of him: "Most of those who watched him, or even met him, took him for a cheerful extrovert. This was wrong. He thought a lot, worried a lot, fretted a lot, all the more because he struggled to present a calm, bold front to the outer world."

David Foot, the author of Gimblett's biography, wrote in his history of Somerset cricket that Gimblett "retained obsessive complexes about class, money and health". In the biography, Foot writes of discovering the depth and the variety of Gimblett's different hatreds: "The hate – his uncompromising word – was spread over a wide area." He appears to have found congeniality difficult and resentment easy, and there were periods of depressive illness. These culminated at the end of the 1953 cricket season in what appears to have been a full-scale breakdown.

Gimblett's own words, quoted in the Foot biography, tell the story. "I couldn't take much more. I was taking sleeping pills to make me sleep and others to wake me up. By the end of 1953 the world was closing in on me. I couldn't offer any reason why and I don't think the medical profession knew either." In the winter of 1953–54, Gimblett spent 16 weeks in Tone Vale Hospital, a psychiatric institution, where he was given electro-convulsive therapy, and was released in time to join the Somerset team for the start of the 1954 season. He played in the first two county matches of the new season, but was not fit enough mentally to continue and – though the details vary – Somerset agreed to give him time off. He did not appear in first-class cricket again. Later in the 1954 season, according to Gimblett's own report, he went to Somerset's Taunton ground to watch some of the cricket, and was "ordered out of the ground".

Out of first-class cricket, Gimblett took a job as a cricket professional with Ebbw Vale Cricket Club in South Wales. He then applied for and got a job with his old Somerset captain, Jack Meyer, who was headmaster of Millfield School. The link with Meyer gave rise to continuing rumours of a possible comeback for Somerset across the 1950s, but it did not happen. In 1959, however, he appeared in a few Minor Counties matches for Dorset. At Millfield, Gimblett helped with the cricket coaching, ran the school shop and did other tasks around the school such as driving minibuses. In the end, his mental and physical health problems – he suffered from arthritis – meant he fell out with Millfield in the same way that he had with county cricket, and he retired to live at Minehead; he was involved in a minor way with coaching and fund-raising for Somerset, but his behaviour was sometimes unpredictable and he found it hard to reconcile his former fame with his reduced circumstances.

At the time of his death, Gimblett had moved from Minehead to a mobile home at Verwood, Dorset. He died after taking an overdose of prescription drugs. He was survived by his wife, Marguerita (Rita), whom he married in 1938, and by a son.

== Legacy ==
In May 2026, the church doors of St George's Church in Gimblett's birth village of Bicknoller were dedicated to his memory; the newly-installed doors feature handles in the shape of cricket bats.

== Bibliography ==
- David Foot (1984). Harold Gimblett: Tormented Genius of Cricket (1984 ed.). Star (W. H. Allen). ISBN 0-352-31426-5.
