= Simon Turner =

Simon Turner may refer to:

- Simon Fisher Turner (born 1954), English musician and actor
  - Simon Turner (album)
- Simon Turner (cricketer) (born 1960), English cricketer
- Simon Turner (botanist), Harrison Professor of Botany at the School of Biological Sciences, University of Manchester since 2005
- Simon Turner, fictional character in the video game Indiana Jones and the Infernal Machine
