= Philip Davey (cricketer) =

English cricketer

Personal information
- Full name: Philip John Davey
- Born: 10 August 1913; Bishop's Hull, Somerset, England
- Died: 8 December 2000 (aged 87); Taunton, Somerset, England
- Batting: Right-handed
- Bowling: Right-arm medium
- Role: Bowler

Domestic team information
- Years: Team
- 1934–1937: Somerset
- First-class debut: 16 June 1934 v Surrey
- Last First-class: 27 August 1937 v Worcestershire

Career statistics
| Competition | FC |
|---|---|
| Matches | 16 |
| Runs scored | 235 |
| Batting average | 10.21 |
| 100s/50s | 0/0 |
| Top score | 30 |
| Balls bowled | 1098 |
| Wickets | 22 |
| Bowling average | 28.18 |
| 5 wickets in innings | 1 |
| 10 wickets in match | – |
| Best bowling | 6/9 |
| Catches/stumpings | 10/– |
- Source: CricketArchive, 23 November 2010

Philip John Davey (10 August 1913 – 8 December 2000) was an English cricketer. He played first-class cricket for Somerset from 1934 to 1937. He was born at Bishop's Hull, a civil parish in Taunton, Somerset.

== Career ==
Davey was a right-handed batsman and a right-arm medium-pace bowler. In his first matches for Somerset, he batted in middle order, but later he appeared further down, and his figures suggest that was a more correct placing. In his third game, against Glamorgan in the only first-class match ever played at Downside School, he made 30 and this was the highest score of his career.

It was as a bowler that Davey enjoyed greater success. In his second game for Somerset, he took four wickets for 71 runs in Worcestershire's first innings, causing with Jack Lee a collapse that took Worcestershire from 292 for three to 332 all out. Just 10 days later, he improved those figures in another batting collapse with four for 49 against Derbyshire. Finally, in the return match with Worcestershire at Frome, he took six wickets for just nine runs in nine overs and two balls, the best figures of his career. Aside from these three innings, however, he took only five other wickets in the 1934 season. He returned for five matches in the 1935 season, and one in each of the 1936 and 1937 seasons, but without success.

== Outside cricket ==
Davey later became a schoolmaster. On 8 December 2000, he died in Taunton at the age of 87. His obituary in Wisden Cricketers' Almanack records that he was educated at Cambridge University but did not appear in first-class cricket for the university side.
