= Clifford Andrews =

English cricketer

Personal information
- Full name: Clifford Jack Andrews
- Born: 6 August 1912; Swindon, Wiltshire, England
- Died: 11 December 1973 (aged 61); Eastleigh, Hampshire, England
- Batting: Right-handed
- Role: Wicket-keeper
- Relatives: Bill Andrews (brother)

Domestic team information
- Years: Team
- 1938–1948: Hampshire

Career statistics
Competition	First-class
Matches	7
Runs scored	127
Batting average	14.11
100s/50s	–/–
Top score	29
Catches/stumpings	6/1
- Source: Cricinfo, 23 December 2009

Clifford Jack Andrews (6 August 1912 — 11 December 1973) was an English first-class cricketer and rugby union player.

Andrews was born at Swindon in August 1912. In Swindon, his father was a publican, but the family moved to Weston-super-Mare in 1921. There he was educated at Weston Grammar School and played club cricket for Weston-super-Mare Cricket Club. Andrews made his debut in first-class cricket for Hampshire prior to the Second World War, playing against Cambridge University at Southampton in 1938. During the war, he served as a police officer with the Southampton City Police and was known to play exhibition matches for their cricket team. Following the war, he returned to play first-class cricket for Hampshire, typically as cover for regular wicket-keeper Neil McCorkell. In total, he made seven first-class appearances for Hampshire to 1948. In these, he scored 127 runs at an average of 14.11, with a highest score of 29. As wicket-keeper, he took six catches and made a single stumping. Outside of cricket, Andrews played rugby union for the Hampshire representative rugby union team, having played rugby for Hampshire since 1933. He was the younger brother of the Somerset all-rounder Bill Andrews, and was known in his family as "Jack". Andrews died at his home in Eastleigh in December 1973.
