= Philip Davey =

Philip Davey may refer to:

- Phillip Davey (1896–1953), Australian recipient of the Victoria Cross
- Philip Davey (cricketer) (1913–2000), English cricketer
