= Jim Redman (cricketer) =

Personal information
- Full name: James Redman
- Born: 1 March 1926; Bath, Somerset, England
- Died: 24 September 1981 (aged 55); Salisbury, Wiltshire, England
- Batting: Right-handed
- Bowling: Right-arm fast-medium
- Role: Bowler

Domestic team information
- Years: Team
- 1948–1953: Somerset
- FC debut: 31 July 1948 Somerset v Hampshire
- Last FC: 15 June 1953 Somerset v Leicestershire

Career statistics
Competition	First-class
Matches	65
Runs scored	1,012
Batting average	12.34
100s/50s	0/0
Top score	45
Balls bowled	7,659
Wickets	117
Bowling average	35.63
5 wickets in innings	4
10 wickets in match	0
Best bowling	7/23
Catches/stumpings	19/–
- Source: CricketArchive, 15 January 2010

James Redman (1 March 1926 – 24 September 1981) played first-class cricket for Somerset as a fast-medium bowler between 1948 and 1953. He was born at Bath, Somerset in 1926.

== First-class cricket career ==
Redman was a right-handed lower order batsman and a right-arm seam bowler, "only a little above medium pace". After playing club cricket for Bath Cricket Club, he was tried in two matches for Somerset in 1948; the second of these was the match against the Australian team known as the Invincibles, and Redman with three wickets for 78 runs was the most successful of the Somerset bowlers – though an Australian total of 560 for five wickets gave them victory by an innings and 374 runs inside two days.

Redman was used primarily as an opening bowler for a weak side whose principal wicket-takers throughout his career were all spin bowlers. There were six matches and 11 wickets in 1949 and 10 matches with 16 expensive wickets in 1950. Seven of these 16 wickets came in one match against Surrey at The Oval, and in the first Surrey innings he took five for 50, the first five-wicket return of his career. Wisden noted that he bowled "at a fine pace" and that he took four wickets for 18 runs as Surrey fell to 49 for five before a recovery.

In 1951, he played in all but the first of Somerset's County Championship matches – he appeared in 27 games – and was awarded his county cap. He took 50 wickets in all at the relatively high average of 33.76. After the third Championship match, Maurice Tremlett, who had taken eight wickets to that point, did not bowl again during the season, and Redman opened the bowling in every other game with Bertie Buse, also barely above medium pace; they were backed by the three spin bowlers, Ellis Robinson, Johnny Lawrence and Horace Hazell, and these five bowlers then took all of Somerset's wickets for Championship matches across the whole summer. Redman had limited numbers of successful days: against Nottinghamshire at Yeovil he took five wickets for 151 runs after Tremlett had withdrawn from the attack. But his best performance was a month later at Frome: in the Derbyshire first innings, bowling unchanged with Buse, Redman took seven wickets for 23 runs as Derbyshire were dismissed for just 52 in an hour and 45 minutes. This return, from what Wisden termed "deadly swing bowling by Redman", was the best of his first-class career. In addition to his bowling, Redman also batted usefully in the lower order in 1951, making 472 runs at an average of 13.88. His highest score of the season, and the highest of his career, was 45 against Essex at Brentwood.

In 1952, Somerset had what Wisden termed "a disastrous season" and finished at the bottom of the County Championship. Lack of bowling penetration was the main problem, and Redman, who played in 17 Championship games, took only 33 wickets at the average of 35.39. There was only one outstanding performance: in the match against Gloucestershire at Taunton, he took seven wickets for 49 runs in a rain-spoilt match. Towards the end of the season, Redman lost his regular place in the side as the Cambridge University batsman Gerry Tordoff, who bowled a bit, came into the side. Redman left the Somerset staff at the end of the 1952 season.

Redman played only three more times for Somerset as an amateur, all of them matches at the Bath cricket festival in 1953, and he bowled only 18 overs in these matches, taking just two further wickets. He did have a prominent role in one of the season's memorable matches, though: the game against Lancashire, designated as Bertie Buse's benefit match, was finished inside a single day on a terrible pitch. Somerset's two innings resulted in totals of 55 and 79, and the match lasted up till six o-clock on the first day only because of a second-innings last-wicket stand of 35 between Redman, who made an unbeaten 27 – the only other double-figure score in the match for Somerset was 14 by Harold Stephenson – and the 17-year-old Brian Langford. Redman took two wickets in this match but failed in the other two games at Bath, and did not play first-class cricket again.

== After first-class cricket ==
Leaving professional cricket at the end of 1952, Redman went into business and later moved from Bath to Salisbury. He played a few matches for Wiltshire in the Minor Counties Championship between 1958 and 1964, and in the match against Somerset's Second Eleven in 1962, he made 112. He died at Salisbury in Wiltshire in 1981.
