= Harry Lee (cricketer) =

English cricketer (1890–1981)

Personal information
- Full name: Henry William Lee
- Born: 26 October 1890; London, England
- Died: 21 April 1981 (aged 90); London, England
- Batting: Right-handed
- Bowling: Right-arm off break; Right-arm slow-medium
- Role: All-rounder
- Relatives: Frank Lee (brother); Jack Lee (brother)

International information
- National side: England
- Only Test (cap 258): 13 February 1931 v South Africa

Domestic team information
- Years: Team
- 1909–1934: MCC
- 1911–1934: Middlesex

Umpiring information
- FC umpired: 153 (1935–1946)

Career statistics
Competition	Test	First-class
Matches	1	437
Runs scored	19	20,158
Batting average	9.50	29.95
100s/50s	0/0	38/81
Top score	18	243*
Balls bowled	–	26,660
Wickets	–	401
Bowling average	–	30.61
5 wickets in innings	–	12
10 wickets in match	–	3
Best bowling	–	8/39
Catches/stumpings	0/–	180/–
- Source: CricketArchive, 18 August 2011

Henry William "Harry" Lee (26 October 1890 – 21 April 1981) was a professional English cricketer who played first-class cricket for the Marylebone Cricket Club (MCC) and Middlesex County Cricket Club between 1911 and 1934. He made one Test appearance for England, in 1931. An all-rounder, Lee was a right-handed batsman and bowled both off break and slow-medium pace bowling with his right arm. He scored 1,000 runs in a season on thirteen occasions. Part of the County Championship winning sides in 1920 and 1921, Lee aggregated 20,158 runs and took 401 wickets in first-class cricket.

The son of a greengrocer, Lee worked hard to earn himself a place in the Middlesex side in the years before the First World War, eventually getting his chance in 1914 when other players had joined the early war effort. Lee enlisted in the army in September 1914 and served until December 1915; although shot in the leg, declared dead and taken prisoner of war, he survived and returned to play for Middlesex in 1919. He secured his place in the team with three strong all-round seasons, and was twice part of a top four when each batsman scored a century in the same innings—he shares this achievement with Jack Hearne. Less prolific through the mid-1920s, he scored runs heavily once again towards the end of the decade. He made his only Test appearance in 1931, drafted into the England team after injuries and illness depleted the squad. He continued playing county cricket until 1934, when he was released by Middlesex aged 44, to allow the county to develop younger players. He umpired first-class cricket from his retirement until the Second World War, standing in 153 matches.

Lee's career was overshadowed by more attractive, faster-scoring batsmen in the team, such as Hearne and Patsy Hendren. His two younger brothers also played first-class cricket; both Jack and Frank moved to Somerset after failing to break into the Middlesex team. All three brothers scored centuries during the 1931 season, the first instance of three professional brothers doing so in first-class cricket. Two years later, all three were involved in a single dismissal: Harry was caught by Frank off the bowling of Jack in a county match. At the time of his death in 1981, Lee was the second-oldest living Test cricketer.

== Early years ==
Lee was born in Marylebone, London on 26 October 1890, the eldest of three boys, all of whom progressed to play first-class cricket. His father was a greengrocer and a coal merchant who followed cricket closely in the London evening papers. During Lee's youth, he developed his cricket by playing against lamp-posts, and reflected in his autobiography that: "If a bowler can clean bowl a man nine times out of ten against a lamp-post, he will not miss a full-sized wicket when he gets the chance." His cricketing talent was encouraged at school; he first attended Barrett Street School and then St. Thomas's School in Portman Square. Both schools had headmasters who were sports enthusiasts, and at St. Thomas's the headmaster, Mr. Despicht, offered a penny to any schoolboy who could bowl him out, a feat Lee achieved regularly. Mr. Despicht also taught Lee to concentrate on bowling a good length, and Lee played primarily as a bowler during his school years. During his final year at St. Thomas's, the school reached the final of the local Church School's League Shield, and Lee earned victory for his school with six wickets. When Lee left school, he worked with his father as a greengrocer, a job he liked, but not enough to stop him writing a letter to the Marylebone Cricket Club, asking for a job on the ground staff at Lord's Cricket Ground.

Along with approximately 25 other boys, Lee was invited for a trial at Lord's early in 1906, and bowled under the observation of Alfred Atfield and the head groundsman, Tom Hearne. Lee described his first over as "six of the worst balls that anyone can ever have pitched", but as his nerves calmed, he improved, and was eventually selected as one of the five ground staff boys by Hearne. As a ground boy, Lee had numerous tasks; sweeping, dusting and cleaning the seats, preparing nets, marking the pitch, weeding and similar. On a match day, jobs included selling scorecards, operating the score-board or fielding in the practice nets. All of this left little time for the boys to practise their own game. No formal coaching was in place, but Lee was guided by a few different players; England internationals Teddy Wynyard and Albert Trott among them. In the 1909 and 1910 seasons, Lee started to gain some attention from Middlesex County Cricket Club: he scored 39 runs in a match for the Middlesex Colts in 1909, and 60 runs against Reading Cricket Club in 1910. He was making more appearances for the Marylebone Cricket Club (MCC), collecting runs and wickets regularly, but not prolifically. In 1911, when a number of the Middlesex side were missing due to trial matches for England selection, Lee was invited to join the team for two County Championship matches in the south-west, against Somerset and Gloucestershire. Placed at number eleven in Middlesex's batting order, Lee batted once in a rain-affected match against Somerset, remaining four not out, and was not required to bowl. Lee did bowl against Gloucestershire, but remained wicketless from nine overs in the match.

Lee was given greater opportunities in 1912, appearing seven times for Middlesex in the Championship. The first of these appearances, against Warwickshire at Edgbaston, brought Lee his first wicket in first-class cricket when he caught Charles Baker off his own bowling. He claimed five wickets in the match, and another three against Nottinghamshire a month later, to total eight wickets for the season at 9.50 runs apiece and finish technically at the top of the county's bowling averages for the season. Lee joined the MCC bowling staff in 1913 at the invitation of A. J. Webbe, but he was used sparingly in first-class cricket that season, playing just three times, all for Middlesex. In the first of these matches, Lee scored 35 not out at the end of Middlesex's innings, helping his side to avoid the follow-on. His "plucky knock" was praised by captain Pelham Warner, who promoted him to bat at number five in the fourth innings, by which stage the game was heading for a draw. During 1913, although certainly not a regular in the Middlesex team, Lee asked his captain for his county cap, a request which Warner responded to with surprise that he had not already received it, and promptly asked for one to be sent down.

In the 1914 season, Lee almost doubled his total of first-class appearances. Two early season appearances against Oxford and Cambridge universities brought a few runs, and a match for the MCC against Hampshire saw Lee bat at number six in both innings. He played just twice in the County Championship prior to August, both times against Warwickshire. The start of the First World War in early August initially resulted in the cancellation of Middlesex's tour of the northern counties, Yorkshire and Lancashire, but this decision was later reversed, and Middlesex took a heavily weakened side on the tour. Due to regular opening batsman William Robertson being unavailable, Lee was promoted to open the batting alongside Frank Tarrant. He scored 30 and 16 against Yorkshire, followed by 1 and 44 not out against Lancashire. Lee and Tarrant continued to open for Middlesex for the remainder of the season, and against Nottinghamshire, Lee scored his first century in first-class cricket. Having been dismissed for 17 in the first innings, Lee scored 139 runs in the second, and shared a partnership of 183 runs with Patsy Hendren, who also reached his century.

== First World War ==
=== Prisoner of war ===
Henry William Lee
- Military career
- Allegiance: United Kingdom
- Branch: British Army
- Service years: 1914–15
- Rank: Private
- Unit: London Regiment
- Conflicts: First World War: Battle of Neuve Chapelle; Battle of Aubers Ridge
- Awards: Silver War Badge; 1914–15 Star; British War Medal; Victory Medal

Initially, even after the declaration of war, Lee did not feel that there would be any impact on his life, and was looking forward to playing cricket in the 1915 season. After learning that the MCC and Middlesex County Cricket Club were keen to support the war effort, and encountering members of the Territorial Force marching through London, Lee changed his mind and enlisted into 13th (County of London) Battalion (part of the all-Territorial Force London Regiment) in Kensington (the battalion was usually known as "The Kensingstons" as it recruited largely from that area of London) on 1 September 1914. At this time the pre-war battalion had been split into two, with the "first line", 1/13th Battalion, of men who had volunteered for overseas service then being based in Abbots Langley, Hertfordshire, this unit would be sent to France in November 1914. The "second line", 2/13th Battalion, of men who had not volunteered for overseas service and new recruits was initially at White City, London prior to moving to Maidstone, Kent in January 1915. In December 1914 a "third line" battalion, 3/13th Battalion, was formed as an additional training unit. This was based at Richmond Park. The surviving portions of Lee's service record are unclear as to which of these units he spent time with during his training.

He was posted to 1/13th (County of London) Battalion on 25 February 1915, and joined them in France just over a week later. Lee participated in the Battle of Neuve Chapelle in mid-March, an Allied offensive to regain the French village of Neuve-Chapelle. The village was retaken from the Germans, but the plan to press on and also capture Aubers was abandoned. Following this attack, the Germans heavily refortified the area and were expecting further attacks. The battle, part of a larger offensive known as the Battle of Aubers Ridge, commenced on 9 May. The Kensingtons formed part of 25th Brigade, and were one of the lead infantry units in the northern pincer of the attack, targeting Fromelles. Lee was part of D Company, which along with C Company led the Kensingtons during the assault. During the attack, the initial objectives were achieved, but at heavy cost. However, the attacking forces soon ran out of ammunition and retreated the following morning. Of the 550 men that the Kensingtons had engaged, there were 499 casualties, including 13 officers; in total the British casualties numbered over 11,000 men.

During the attack Lee was shot in the leg; a bullet hit his left thigh and fractured his femur. He lay for three days between the lines having been given up for dead. A memorial service was held after the announcement of his death. After three days, Lee was found by the Germans and transported to hospital in Valenciennes. The ten-hour journey was initially made in the passenger compartment of a train, with sacks of straw, before he transferred to a Red Cross train at Lille. For the first week he was looked after by the French Red Cross, before the Germans took over. He remained in Valenciennes for six weeks, and remained bedridden for the duration of his stay. After this time, he was transferred to a second hospital in Hannover. For the first half of the two-day journey, Lee had to lie on a wooden seat with a blanket under him and his leg in an iron case, which hurt his back significantly, and was provided with no food. The second half of the journey was completed on a Red Cross train. During his stay in Hannover, Lee began to heal quickly, but after receiving advice from a fellow prisoner, he greatly exaggerated the injury, and was selected to be returned to England. He began the journey on 1 October 1915, and boarded the boat for England five days later. Although Lee had amplified the severity of his injury, in England he discovered that one of his legs would be permanently shorter than the other, and he had suffered significant muscle death. He was told that he would neither be able to fight nor play cricket again. He was discharged from the army on 4 December 1915, and was eligible for the Silver War Badge to show that he had served honourably. He later also received the 1914–15 Star, British War Medal and Victory Medal. After leaving the army, Middlesex paid for Lee to be treated by a specialist, and he was able to play a match for the Army Service Corps against Lancing College in early 1916, in which he scored a century.

=== Coaching in India ===
Lee narrowly avoided two U-boat attacks during his journey to India.

Having been invalided out of the Army, Lee worked as a filing clerk in the War Office, a position which allowed him plenty of time to play cricket with the MCC and in other wartime matches. Towards the end of the summer in 1916, he met Frank Tarrant's wife, who suggested that Lee should accompany her husband to work in India. He readily accepted, but before he was able to leave, his mother died and Lee felt that he should remain at home to look after his two young brothers. A year later, with the household settled, Lee took Tarrant up on the offer. He was originally booked on the Nyanza, which was sailing to Bombay, but was transferred to the Nagoya at the last minute, which sailed directly to Lee's final destination of Calcutta. The Nyanza was torpedoed 20 miles (32 km) out of Plymouth, and though it returned to port, 49 lives were lost. During the Nagoya's journey, the convoy of which it was part was attacked passing through the Mediterranean Sea by the German U-boat UB-50. One of the ships, the City of Lucknow, an 8,000 ton cargo steamer in the convoy, was sunk. The rest of the journey was completed without incident, despite a rumour that the Emden, a German light cruiser, lay in wait for the convoy.

In India, Lee worked as a football and cricket coach for the Maharaja of Cooch Behar, but was treated more like a guest than a paid retainer. He played a few first-class matches during his time in India, and in his first match in the country, for the Maharaja's XI against Lord Willingdon's XI, Lee claimed his maiden five-wicket haul, taking five wickets and conceding eleven runs. He added another three wickets in the second innings to record the best bowling analysis of the match. In November 1918, Lee played for England against India. The Indian team did not have Test status, which was not attained until 1932, but they had a strong team, and dominated the match against an England side which was far from representative. Lee claimed four wickets in the match for the concession of 177 runs, and made scores of eight and nine with the bat. Lee's highest score, and only century in first-class cricket in India was made in a match he was playing against the Maharaja of Cooch Behar's team. Appearing instead for MC Bird's XI, Lee opened the batting and scored 104 runs. He also claimed seven wickets in the match, which his side won by an innings.

== Return to county cricket ==
Despite the injury he sustained during the war, when county cricket resumed in 1919, Lee took his leave of the Maharaja and returned to England to resume his career with Middlesex. County Championship matches were played over two days, an experiment which was unpopular with Lee, who described it as a "nightmare season". Even with these shorter matches, Lee passed 1,000 first-class runs in a season for the first time in his career, and won himself a regular place in the Middlesex side. He scored four centuries during the season, including one in each innings of a charity match played against Surrey at The Oval. During the first innings, he reached 163, sharing a second wicket partnership of 226 with Jack Hearne, and in the second he scored 126. His batting average for the season was 40.76; the first of only three times that it would exceed 40 during his career. The championship reverted to three-day matches for 1920, and Lee enjoyed his greatest successes as a batsman during the season. He scored centuries in successive matches in mid-May, reaching 102 against Warwickshire at Lord's, and then 119 against Sussex at the same venue. Against Sussex, each of Middlesex's top four batsmen scored centuries; in addition to Lee's 119 runs, Pelham Warner scored 139, Nigel Haig 131, and Hearne remained 116 not out when the side declared. This was the first time the feat had been achieved in first-class cricket. Lee also took eleven wickets in the match, taking five in the first innings and six in the second to complete his maiden ten-wicket haul. In doing so, he became one of only eight Middlesex cricketers to have taken ten wickets in the same match as scoring a century. Playing against Hampshire at Southampton the following month, Lee scored his first double century, being 221 not out when Middlesex declared. He was also not out in the second innings, meaning that he was on the pitch for the full duration of the match. In total, Lee scored 1,518 runs at an average of 43.37 in first-class matches in 1920. He ranked third amongst Middlesex batsmen—by both runs scored and batting average—in the County Championship, which the county won narrowly, completing victory in the final session of their final match. In A History of Cricket, H. S. Altham and E. W. Swanton praise Lee's "all-round excellence" during the season: in addition to his runs, he claimed 40 wickets in the Championship at an average of 22.40.

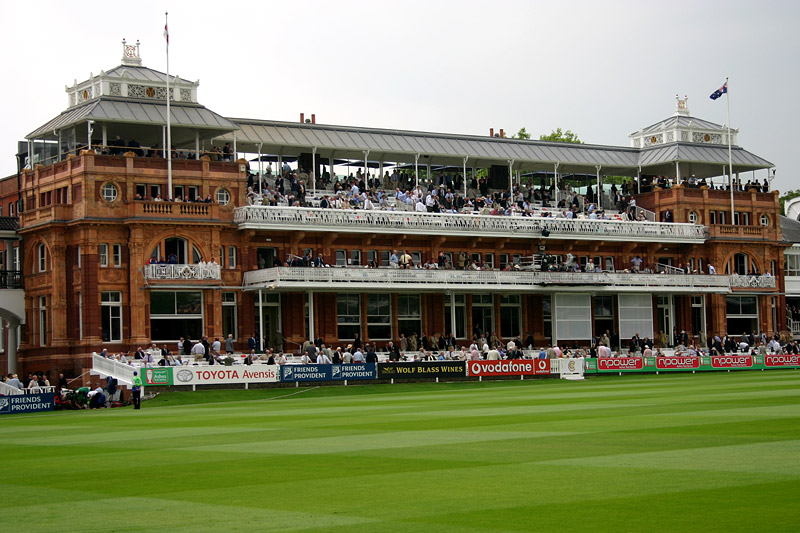
The pavilion at Lord's Cricket Ground, Lee's home ground for Middlesex and the MCC.

Lee's performances put him in contention for a place on the English touring party to travel to Australia that winter, but he eventually missed out on selection. Instead, he travelled to South Africa for the first of many winters playing and coaching in the country, accepting an invitation from the Wanderers Club in Johannesburg. For the second consecutive season, Lee scored in excess of 1,500 runs in all first-class matches in 1921, aided by his highest career score; 243 not out against Nottinghamshire. Lee batted for over six hours to reach the score in a match which Middlesex won by an innings. He only scored one other century during the season, 121 runs against Sussex, but passed 50 on nine occasions. However, he enjoyed his best season as a bowler, claiming 72 first-class wickets at an average of 19.66, the best of his career. (Note: When bowling over 300 deliveries.) Middlesex won the County Championship once more, and Lee finished third in both the batting and bowling tables, behind Hearne and Hendren amongst the batsmen, and Jack Durston and Haig, the bowlers. After the season, he travelled once more to South Africa, this time to coach at both St. Andrew's School and Grey College in Bloemfontein. His obituary in the Wisden Cricketers' Almanack states that by the end of 1921 his best years were over.

Lee was certainly less prolific over the following few years: he averaged under 25 with the bat in each of the years from 1923 to 1925, and only passed 1,000 first-class runs in the first of the three. For the second time in his career, Lee was part of a batting line-up in which each of the top four batsmen scored a century: against Hampshire in Southampton, Lee scored 107, fellow opener Hugh Dales got 103, Hearne reached 232 and Hendren remained 177 not out as Middlesex declared with 642 runs. In 1923, he recorded his best bowling performance, taking eight wickets for the concession of 39 runs in the first innings against Gloucestershire at Cheltenham. He took a further four wickets in the second innings to help Middlesex to an eight wicket victory. He claimed 50 wickets for the third and final time that season, in which he was utilised heavily, being Middlesex's third most used bowler. He did not travel to South Africa in either of 1923–24 or 1924–25, a fact which he describes as the "cause and effect" of his poor form in 1924 and 1925. He travelled to South Africa again in 1926, spending the first of three successive winters in Cape Town, coaching at South African College Schools. This coincided with a revival in his county cricket batting form; in 1926 he passed 1,000 runs after missing out on the total for two years.

Heading toward the twilight of his career, Lee enjoyed a batting renaissance in 1928 and 1929. He averaged over 35 in each season, and scored runs heavily, reaching 1,715 runs in the first year and 1,995 in the second, the most in any season of his career. For the only time in his career, Lee was selected in 1928 to play for the professional "Players" team in the prestigious Gentlemen v Players fixture. Appearing in the contest at The Oval in early June, he opened the batting and scored 56 runs. The match finished as a draw with the final day lost to rain. In 1929, he scored a century in each innings of a match for the second time, making 124 and 105 not out against a strong Lancashire bowling attack. Later that season, he scored his third and final double century, scoring 225 runs against Surrey at The Oval, during which he shared a second wicket partnership of 319 with Gubby Allen. Lee's 1,617 runs for Middlesex in the County Championship in 1929 made him their leading run-scorer, although both Hearne and Hendren topped 1,000 runs with superior averages. The following season saw Lee accumulate 1,485 first-class runs at an average of 26.05, in the season which saw him play more matches than in any other: 34 in total. He reached a century only once, scoring 150 runs against Somerset at Taunton.

== Solitary Test ==
For the English winter of 1930–31, Lee took on positions at both St. Andrew's College and Rhodes University, both in Grahamstown in South Africa. The MCC were touring that winter, and suffered heavily with injuries and illness. No fewer than seven players were missing at various stages, and the England captain, Percy Chapman, requested that Lee be excused from his coaching duties to join up with the touring party. Having believed he had secured this permission, he made his first appearance against Natal, scoring 14 runs in his only innings. He played in three further tour matches, twice making scores in the forties, but not reaching a half-century during the tour. His only Test appearance came in the fourth Test between England and South Africa. Lee opened the innings alongside Bob Wyatt and scored 18 and 1 in his two innings of the match, which finished a draw. During the match, the MCC were contacted by one of the schools he had been coaching at, which claimed that Lee had broken his contract by leaving without permission. Lee argued vehemently against these claims, citing the fact that the sportsmaster at the school had told Jack White that he had permission to leave, but the MCC were unmoved, and refused to issue Lee his England cap and blazer until he had apologised. Lee felt he had no need to apologise, and never received either cap or blazer, though small compensation came in the form of an England touring tie, which Jack Hobbs gave to him.

== Later career ==
Though now into his forties, Lee remained a regular in the Middlesex side in the early 1930s, and in 1931 he scored 1,291 runs at an average of 30.02, including two centuries. Both of his brothers, Jack and Frank, also scored a first-class century during the season, Jack scoring 113 for Somerset against Northamptonshire, and Frank carried his bat to remain 134 not out for Somerset against Sussex. The feat was the first instance of three professional brothers all scoring first-class centuries in the same season. Two years later, all three brothers were involved in a dismissal: Harry Lee was caught for 82 runs by Frank from the bowling of Jack. Though Lee passed 1,000 first-class runs in each of 1932 and 1933, he did so with averages under 25, and in 1934 he was dropped from the Middlesex side in order to encourage some younger players to break into the team. He continued to appear for the MCC during the season, and scored a century against Cambridge University in early July. He was briefly recalled to the Middlesex team in August, and recorded a final century, reaching 119 against Warwickshire. Although he was successful in the subsequent match against Surrey, making scores of 65 and 38 not out, Middlesex terminated his contract at the end of the season, much to his disappointment. In 437 first-class appearances, Lee scored a total of 20,158 runs at an average of 29.95. He scored 38 centuries and passed 1,000 runs in a season on 13 occasions.

Upon the completion of his playing career, Lee began umpiring almost straight away, standing in non-first-class MCC matches. He petitioned Middlesex to be put forward for first-class duties for the following season, which they duly did. He was approved by the county captains, and umpired first-class cricket from 1935 until 1946. He then returned to coaching, taking on a position at Downside School in Somerset from 1949 until 1953. He was a regular attendee at Lord's throughout the remainder of his life, and by the time of his death in 1981, he was England's second oldest Test cricketer.

== Playing style ==
In his own words, Lee was not a "brilliant youngster like Jack Hearne or Denis Compton, but an ordinary, average county cricketer". Despite this assertion, Lee's 18,594 first-class runs for Middlesex rank him eleventh in their all-time list, and he is one of only seventeen cricketers to have scored over 5,000 runs and taken over 300 wickets for the county. H. S. Altham and E. W. Swanton suggested that figures alone do show his true worth, as at the time the Lord's pitch did not favour batsmen, and had he played his career on "some other ground where the pitch was a batsman's paradise, his figures would have borne a truer relation to his value." Lee batted with a noticeable crouch, and scored predominantly on the leg side. His style was unattractive to watch, but effective, and although Hearne and Hendren drew most of the plaudits for their more colourful methods, Lee received praise for his toughness and courage.

== Notes and references ==
=== National Archives ===
- "WO/372/12 44640/5700: Medal card of Lee, Henry William". (Fee required to view entries) The National Archives. 1915.
- "WO/95/1730 1/398: War Diaries of 25 Infantry Brigade". (Fee required to view entries) The National Archives. 1914–1922.
- "WO/95/1730 1/399: War Diaries of 25 Infantry Brigade". (Fee required to view entries) The National Archives. 1914–1922.
- "WO/161/98 6/2: Prisoners of War Interviews: Lee, Henry William". (Fee required to view entries) The National Archives. 1915.
- "CAB/24/59 15/0015: British Vessels Captured or Destroyed by the Enemy. Volume II. From 1st August 1917 to 1st July 1918". The National Archives. 1918.

== Bibliography ==
- Altham, H.S.; Swanton, E.W. (1938) [1926]. A History of Cricket (Second ed.). London: George Allen & Unwin Ltd.
- Lee, H. W. (1948). Thompson, Laurence (ed.). Forty Years of English Cricket (with excursions to India and South Africa). London: Clerke & Cockeran.
