= Allan Pearse =

English cricketer

Personal information
- Full name: Allan Arthur Pearse
- Born: 22 April 1915; Watchet, Somerset, England
- Died: 14 June 1981 (aged 66); Watchet, Somerset, England
- Batting: Right-handed
- Role: Batsman

Domestic team information
- Years: Team
- 1936–1938: Somerset
- First-class debut: 6 June 1936 Somerset v Kent
- Last First-class: 19 August 1938 Somerset v Worcestershire

Career statistics
Competition	First-class
Matches	9
Runs scored	81
Batting average	5.78
100s/50s	–/–
Top score	20
Balls bowled	12
Wickets	–
Bowling average	–
5 wickets in innings	–
10 wickets in match	–
Best bowling	0/3
Catches/stumpings	1/–
- Source: CricketArchive, 23 October 2010

Allan Arthur Pearse (22 April 1915 – 14 June 1981) played first-class cricket for Somerset in nine matches between 1936 and 1938. He was born and died at Watchet, Somerset.

Pearse was a middle-order right-handed batsman whose club cricket was for Watchet Cricket Club, where Harold Gimblett was his contemporary. As a 16-year-old, playing for Watchet against Wellington Cricket Club, he joined Gimblett with the Watchet score at 37 for seven chasing a total of 160. The pair added the 123 runs needed, Gimblett scoring 91 and Pearse 33. Pearse followed Gimblett into the Somerset side, making his debut in 1936 at the Agricultural Showgrounds, Frome, the same ground where Gimblett had made his sensational debut a year earlier. In his first innings he scored 20, which was the second highest of the Somerset innings against Kent. But in five other first-class matches in the 1936 season he failed to score more than 10 in any innings, and in two matches in 1937 he also made little impression. His last first-class game in 1938 saw him batting at No 10 and failing to score in either innings.
