= Les Angell =

English cricketer

Personal information
- Full name: Frederick Leslie Angell
- Born: 29 June 1922; Norton St Philip, Somerset, England
- Died: 9 October 2014 (aged 92); Bath, Somerset, England
- Batting: Right-handed
- Role: Opening batsman

Domestic team information
- Years: Team
- 1947–1956: Somerset
- FC debut: 21 June 1947 Somerset v Leicestershire
- Last FC: 24 July 1956 Somerset v Derbyshire

Career statistics
Competition	First-class
Matches	132
Runs scored	4,596
Batting average	19.15
100s/50s	1/16
Top score	114
Balls bowled	26
Wickets	0
Bowling average	–
5 wickets in innings	–
10 wickets in match	–
Best bowling	–
Catches/stumpings	54/–
- Source: CricketArchive, 9 August 2008

Frederick Leslie Angell (29 June 1922 – 9 October 2014) was an English first-class cricketer who played for Somerset County Cricket Club. He was born in Norton St Philip, Somerset and died at Bath, Somerset.

A right-handed opening batsman, Angell made a lot of runs in club cricket for the Lansdown Cricket Club in Bath, but his record in first-class cricket was less successful. He played for Somerset in matches at Bath in both 1947 and 1948, and in a few more games in 1949, before joining the county club's staff in 1950. Playing mostly as the opening partner to the ebullient Harold Gimblett, Angell was a restrained, neat batsman and made 933 runs in his first full season, though his average was only 20 and he passed 50 only three times. There was a very similar record in 1951, with 975 runs, again at an average of 20. In 1952, Angell made his highest score of 90 in the match against Derbyshire at Derby. But three weeks later he was dropped from the side and, as Somerset hit the bottom of the County Championship table for what would prove to be the first of four consecutive last-place finishes, he was not re-engaged at the end of the 1952 season.

In 1954, however, with Gimblett retiring suddenly at the start of the season, Angell was recalled to Somerset and proceeded to have his best season in first-class cricket. He scored 1,125 runs at an average of 22.95 and made his highest score (and only first-class century) of 114 in the match against the Pakistanis. Apart from this innings, his highest score for the season was an unbeaten 62. He was less successful again in 1955, and after seven matches in 1956 he left the staff for good.

He continued to be a heavy scorer in club cricket into his late 40s. By profession, he was an engineering draughtsman for a Bath company. He died on 9 October 2014.
