= Devonshire Park Ground, Weston-super-Mare =

Cricket ground in Somerset, England

Coordinates: 51.328911°N 2.973681°W

Devonshire Park Ground
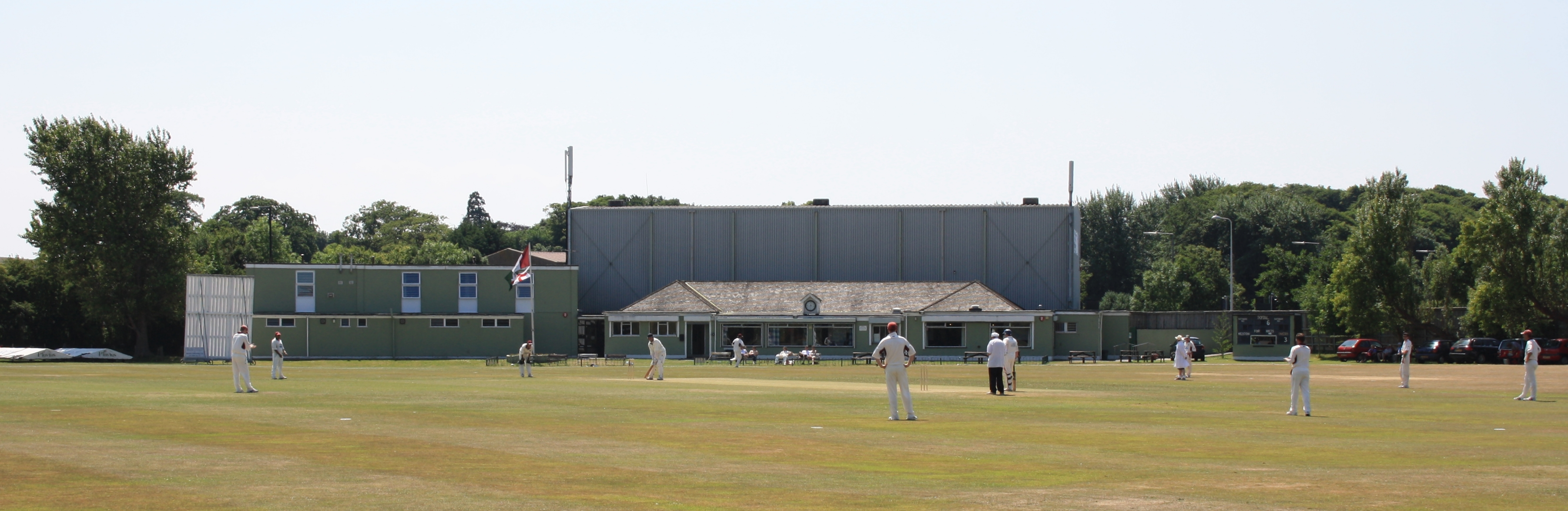
- Interactive map of Devonshire Park Ground

Ground information
- Location: Weston-super-Mare, Somerset
- Country: England

Team information
Weston-super-Mare	(– present)
Somerset	(1969–70)
Somerset Second XI	(1972–91)
- As of 13 July 2010; Source: CricketArchive

Devonshire Park Ground is a cricket ground in Weston-super-Mare, Somerset. It hosted two List A cricket matches for Somerset County Cricket Club; one in 1969, and the other the following year. It has also been the venue for a number of matches for Somerset's second XI, hosting a Minor Counties Championship match in 1972, and eight other second XI matches between 1986 and 1991. It is the home ground for Weston-super-Mare Cricket Club, who have played on the ground since at least 1928.
