= Lansdown Cricket Club =

Coordinates: 51.3896°N 2.3904°W

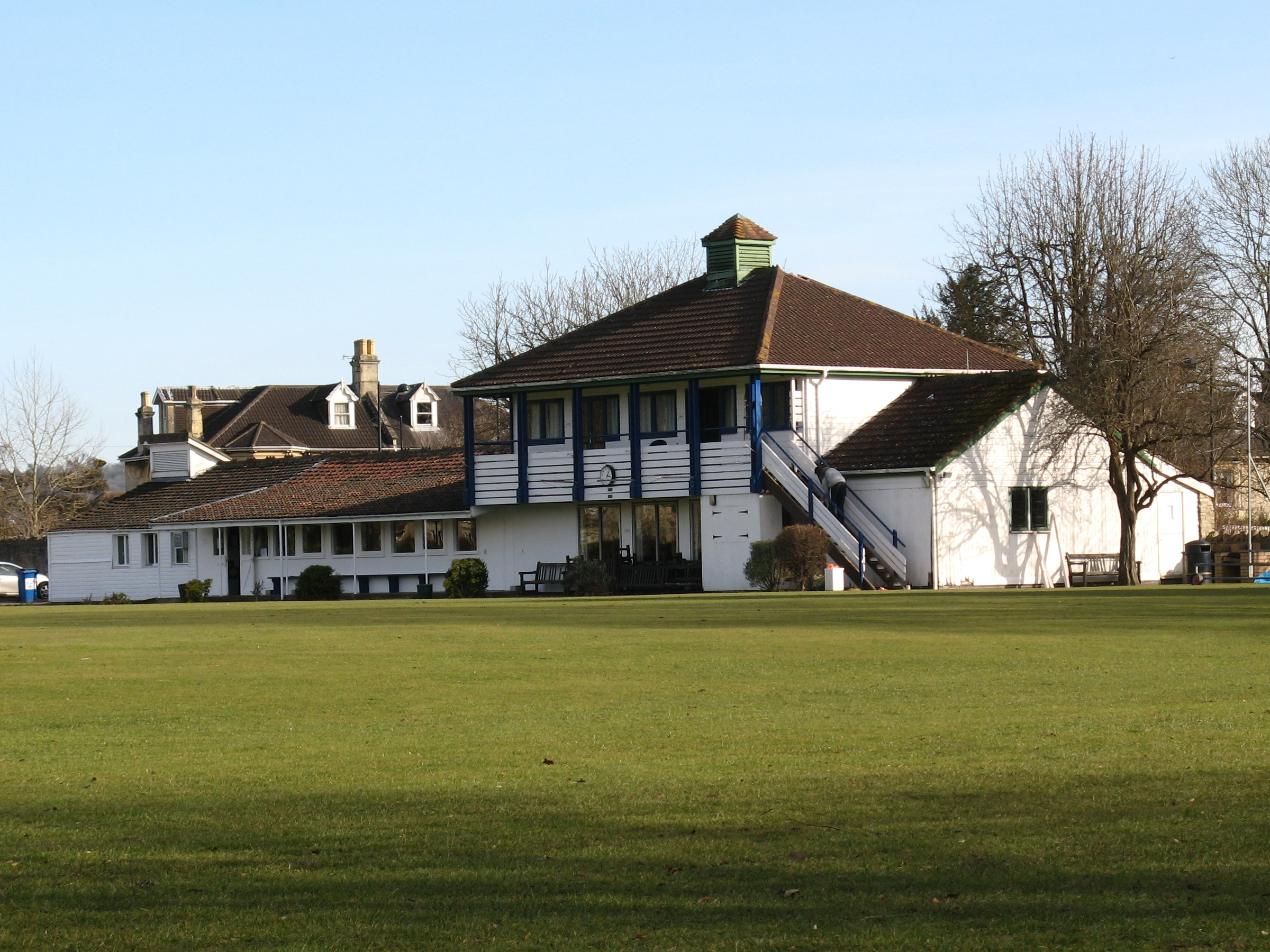

Team information
- Established: 1825
- Home venue: Combe Park

History
- Notable players: W. G. Grace, E M Grace, Edward Sainsbury, Jack Lee, Frank Lee, Viv Richards

Lansdown Cricket Club, formed in 1825, is recognised as the earliest official organised cricket club in Somerset. Originally based in Lansdown, since 1869 the club has been based at Combe Park, Bath, adjacent to the Royal United Hospital.

== Foundation ==
Cricket was relatively slow to come to Somerset, but by the early 19th century it was being played in a haphazard fashion, mainly on gentlemen's country-house grounds. Lansdown was preceded by an up-market Bath club that played from about 1817–1824, and many of that club's enthusiasts went on to become part of Lansdown. Formed in 1825, Lansdown played originally at a ground known either as "Cricket Down" or as the "Racecourse ground" on the summit of the hill called Lansdown to the north of Bath: the ground was not at the site of the current Bath Racecourse but at a little-used racecourse nearer the city, adjacent to Beckford's Tower.

Around 1850, Lansdown moved to Captain Thornhill's Sydenham Field, which was on the south bank of the river Avon in the area later built on by the Midland Railway line that ran into Bath Green Park railway station.

In these early years, arranging matches was a problem as there was a lack of other established clubs of good reputation to play. Trips to Devon, to take on Sidmouth and Teignmouth, and up to Bristol to play Clifton were much the extent of their calendar. During this time, selection was based as much on social status as on talent, and the club was even dubbed by someone as 'the MCC of the West'.

== Early recognition ==
As the years passed, Lansdown's reputation grew, and their opposition similarly grew in reputation, as they entertained Oxford University and the MCC. In 1852, they played host at Sydenham Field to an All England Eleven, Lansdown fielded 22 men and, after three days, the match finished a draw. W. G. Grace made his debut for Lansdown on 5 July 1861, just short of his thirteenth birthday, and played two matches during that month. A few years later, in 1865 when Lansdown entertained United England Eleven, their side contained three of the Grace brothers, with E.M. and Henry Grace also playing. Between the three of them, they took all of the England side's wickets in the match as Lansdown won by an innings and 113 runs. In 1869, the club moved to Combe Park, where it has played ever since.

== Nurturing ground ==
Lansdown has had a number of talented professionals through the years. The Somerset opener Tom Young spent some time at the club in 1910, and the brothers Jack and Frank Lee played for the club while qualifying for Somerset in the 1920s. In the postwar years, the mainstay of the batting for many years was Les Angell, whose prolific scoring for Lansdown masked a more modest record in first-class cricket for Somerset. Almost overlapping with Angell, in 1973, Viv Richards similarly turned out for the side while he served his qualification period for Somerset. During his time at the club he not only entertained the crowd with his runs, but also cut the grass for the club.

== Bibliography ==
- Foot, David. Sunshine, Sixes and Cider: The History of Somerset Cricket (1986 ed.). David & Charles. ISBN 0-7153-8890-8.
