= Bill Andrews (cricketer) =

English cricketer (1908–1989)

Personal information
- Full name: William Harry Russell Andrews
- Born: 14 April 1908; Swindon, Wiltshire, England
- Died: 9 January 1989 (aged 80); Worlebury, Somerset, England
- Batting: Right-handed
- Bowling: Right-arm fast-medium
- Role: Bowler
- Relatives: Clifford Andrews (brother)

Domestic team information
- Years: Team
- 1930–1947: Somerset
- FC debut: 7 May 1930 Somerset v Warwickshire
- Last FC: 30 August 1947 The Rest v M Leyland's XI

Career statistics
Competition	First-class
Matches	231
Runs scored	5,000
Batting average	15.77
100s/50s	0/19
Top score	80
Balls bowled	37,306
Wickets	768
Bowling average	23.48
5 wickets in innings	40
10 wickets in match	6
Best bowling	8/12
Catches/stumpings	96/–
- Source: CricketArchive, 16 October 2009

William Harry Russell Andrews (14 April 1908– 9 January 1989) was an English cricketer who played for Somerset. He was a right-arm fast-medium pace bowler and useful middle-order right-handed batsman. He played 226 matches for Somerset between 1930 and 1947 and took 750 wickets at an average of 23.38 and scored 4,833 runs at an average of 15.59.

Andrews was a tall man (6 ft 3in) with a high arm action, often referred to as "12 o'clock high". He kept a good length and generally bowled in swingers to right-handed batsmen. He claimed his high action was modelled on Ted McDonald.

Although he was sacked four times by Somerset, twice as a player and twice as a coach, he put much of his life into the club as player, coach and later on committees and as a supporter. In turn he became one of the most popular players that Somerset have ever had.

Well to the left in terms of politics, he did not fit in well with the clear distinction between Amateurs and Professionals prevalent in the game when he started. He seems to have had a particular dislike for Jack White, who was his first captain at Somerset and was an amateur from an earlier era. It has been conjectured that his forthright views were the reason that he was never selected to play any representative cricket.

He was well known for his greeting of "Shake the hand that bowled Bradman". He had indeed bowled Bradman in 1938 but it was, of course, a joke since Bradman had scored 202 by that stage and deliberately let himself be bowled. Bradman, who did not start his innings until early on the second day, completed his innings before the tea interval. His second hundred came in just 70 minutes. Andrews' autobiography was called "The Hand that bowled Bradman". Although not entirely accurate it is a good read.

The other great one-liner credited to Andrews was on his Somerset debut in 1930 when he asked the Somerset pro Tom Young: "Am I the worst cricketer that ever played first-class cricket, Mr. Young?". Back came the answer: "No son. There was one worse than you. Trevor Arnott of Glamorgan.". Trevor Arnott had dismissed Tom Young a number of times in the previous two season perhaps explaining why his name came to mind.

== Early life ==
William Harry Russell Andrews was born in Swindon the son of William and Betty Andrews. Betty's maiden name was Russell hence his third name. He had a younger brother Jack Andrews who played 7 matches as a wicket-keeper for Hampshire between 1937 and 1947, and also a sister known as Betty who was also a cricketer, being captain of a cricket team in Southern Rhodesia. In Swindon his father was a publican but the family moved to Weston-super-Mare in 1921 where Andrews saw the visiting Australians, sold scorecards and worked the scoreboard. Andrews left school at the age of fourteen and worked as an office boy in a solicitor's office where his fine handwriting was perhaps his greatest asset. There was tragedy for the family in 1925 when his mother died in childbirth. He played his cricket for the Weston club and learned more about cricket when Arthur Wellard lodged with the Andrews family, having moved to the county in 1927.

== First spell for Somerset ==
Early in 1930 Andrews had applied, along with 140 other, for the post of Professional and Groundsman for East Coker near Yeovil. He got the job, left his job at the solicitor's office and moved to East Coker. Soon afterwards he received an invitation to a trial match at Taunton and although his performance in this match was poor, he did receive an invitation to play for Somerset in their first four county matches of the 1930 season. He left the East Coker ground in the capable hands of his brother Jack.

These four matches brought Andrews 13 wickets at an average of over 30 and he returned to East Coker. He played in 6 more matches in 1930 including one match against Yorkshire in Bradford when he only received a telegram the morning of the match and consequently missed the entire first day. These 6 matches only produced 5 wickets and he finished the season with a bowling average over 40 and a batting average under 5.

He must have sufficiently impressed because he was given a contract for the 1931 season. He played 19 of the 28 Championship matches and took 27 wickets at an average of about 35. He rarely has a chance batting since he was generally number 10 or 11. In danger of losing his contract he was eventually taken on for another season in preference to George Hunt. He played 20 of the 28 Championship matches and both his bowling and batting were showing signs of improvement. Somerset were however stretched financially and Andrews was sacked at the end of the season.

He took 5 wickets in an innings just once in these 3 seasons, 5–52 against Kent at Canterbury in 1931, a match in which Tich Freeman took match figures of 15-94 and Somerset were beaten by 8 wickets.

Andrews himself believed that he was primarily used for away matches particularly against tough opposition. The evidence doesn't entirely support this since of his 49 matches in these 3 seasons 22 were at home and 27 were away, although these included the 3 matches away to Yorkshire. It was true, however, that priority was often given to Amateurs and since they were most often available in the summer holidays in August when Somerset played many of their home games, he was likely to play more often away that at home.

== Forfarshire ==
Out of a job, he took the post of Professional and coach for Forfarshire in Scottish county cricket. In 1933 he finished third in the county batting averages and set a club record by taking 104 wickets. A number of times in 1933 and 1934 Somerset asked him to play but the Forfarshire committee refused. Andrews was keen to return to first-class cricket and during his two seasons in Scotland he made sure that his improved performances were well reported in the local newspapers. His success was such that Somerset offered him a contract for the 1935 season.

== 1935 to 1939 ==
These were the great years for Andrews. He played 142 matches for Somerset in these 5 seasons out of the 144 that Somerset played. He missed just 2 matches through injury in July 1939. This ended a run of 127 consecutive games for the county, a Somerset record at the time. This is in many ways impressive but from a negative point of view it does also indicate that he was never selected to play for England nor was he ever chosen for other important matches like Gentlemen v Players.

Harold Gimblett made his debut in the third game of the 1935 season against Essex at Frome. Gimblett was well on his way to his famous century when Andrews joined him batting at number 10. Andrews was a sufficiently competent batsmen by this stage to keep Gimblett company, knowing that only Horace Hazell was left to bat. On Gimblett's departure Andrews took advantage of the dispirited Essex attack to score a rapid 71, his maiden half-century. He took 108 wickets in 1935, the most by a Somerset bowler, although his 95 Championship wickets was just pipped by Arthur Wellard's 97.

1936 was something of a setback season with Andrews being used somewhat less and taking just 82 wickets. Andrews himself felt that batsmen were working him out after his successes of 1935. He finished the season taking 6–126 against Lancashire at Taunton, a match in which Jack Meyer scored a double century on the final day with Lancashire employing joke bowling to enable him to reach two hundred.

If 1936 had been something of a disappointment 1937 started with great success. Wickets came in virtually every innings and with four wickets against Derbyshire at Taunton Andrews had reached 100 wickets for the season by 15 July, the earliest any Somerset player has reached 100 first-class wickets. Having also scored over 700 runs at this point Andrews must surely have been in the reckoning for either the Players or even a Test place against the New Zealanders. Wellard was selected for the Players at Lord's and later played a single Test against the tourists. Wellard's 1937 figures were no better than Andrews' but he had had a much better 1936. Andrews' performances fell away later in the season but he still finished with 137 wickets for Somerset at an average under 20 and with 1000 runs at an average over 20 he completed the double, even achieving it in Championship matches alone. The highlight of the season was the match against Surrey at The Oval. On the third morning Somerset had just avoided following-on and when Surrey batting again they were dismissed for 35 in 13.4 overs on a treacherous pitch. Andrews took 8-12 including a hat-trick. Despite a rapid 91 not out from Wellard Somerset lost by 11 runs.

Bunty Longrigg replace Ingle as captain in 1938. He seemed more impressed with Andrews' batting and he was frequently higher in the batting order. He did the double again although he only needed 47 in the last match of the season and scored 48 in the first innings. Somerset won by an innings so it was his last innings of the season. His best bowling was against Middlesex at Bath when he had match figures of 13–141, a match Somerset won by 9 wickets. With 10 championship wins, including 8 at home, against 9 defeats this was a rare season when Somerset had more victories than losses.

1939 proved another successful season with the ball but Andrews' batting declined so that he slipped down the batting order. He actually took one more wicket for Somerset than Arthur Wellard from 100 less overs (8 ball overs than season). In five seasons from 1935 to 1939 Andrews had taken 582 wickets and scored nearly 4,000 runs for Somerset and proved himself a key member of the side.

== War years ==
Andrews was in the RAF for most of World War II as ground crew stationed near Blackpool. As a consequence he was able to play a large amount of cricket in these years. He reckoned to have played about a hundred matches each season in 1941, 1942 and 1943 and taken about 300 wickets. Initially playing for Blackpool Services in the Ribblesdale League he later played for Keighley and Bingley in the Bradford league among others. Later in the war he played a number of matches for Glamorgan and the British Empire XI and eventually for Castleton Moor in the Central Lancashire League.

== Final spell for Somerset ==
Andrews rejoined Somerset for 1946, the first post-war season of Championship cricket. His season was mixed with 7–66 against Leicestershire at Melton Mowbray and 8–25 against Hampshire at Portsmouth but overall took just 68 wickets for Somerset. His batting was also disappointing. Against the Indians at Taunton he and Bertie Buse took 5 wickets each and dismissed the Indians for 64, a match Somerset won by an innings.

1947 was his last season for Somerset, a season mostly spent as twelfth man. Against Worcestershire at Worcester the home side need just 126 to win but Andrews took 7-44 and Worcestershire were left on 93-9 off 42 overs in a drawn match. He scored his last half-century with 52* against Hampshire at Bournemouth when he and Horace Hazell put on 74 for the last wicket. Appropriately his final match for Somerset was at Clarence Park, Weston-super-Mare. He was released at the end of the season.

== More League cricket ==
Andrews was now 40 but returned to the Leagues. In 1948 he played for Stourbridge in the Birmingham League. He had great success and took 71 wickets at an average of 11.09 as well as opening the innings. He returned to Stourbridge in 1949 and was the top all-rounder in the League. Returning to Stourbridge again in 1950 he even played for Devon in the Minor Counties Championship in some mid-week matches. He even played for Ebbw Vale in the South Wales and Monmouthshire League in 1953 and 1954 but that marked the end of his cricket playing days.

== Coach and manager ==
Andrews returned as Somerset coach in 1955 but was dismissed after the 1957 season although he continued to be heavily involved in the club as a committeeman and youth coach. He returned again as 2nd XI manager for the 1964 season and also took the role of club coach. He was sacked from this role after the 1969 season, the fourth time he had been dismissed by the club, although he again continued in other capacities until finally bowing out after the 1972 season.

He also coached at a number of schools including Clifton, Downside and Millfield.

== Other sports ==
He played football for many years as a centre-half until retiring in 1950. During a spell with Glastonbury Town in the Western League he was offered a trial with Bristol City. He also played for Taunton Town in the Southern League.

He kept goal at water polo for Weston-super-Mare and also played rugby. Later in life he was a keen golfer.

== Personal life ==
Bill Andrews married twice, firstly to Joan in 1933 and then to Ennyd in 1947. He had a son Michael (born 1936) from his first marriage who died in 1977. There were two children from his second marriage: Mark and Sara.

According to David Foot, Andrews was a manic-depressive. There had been a family history of mental problems with his father spending time in a mental hospital.

He died in January 1989 and was cremated in Weston-super-Mare. Whereas many cricketers have died in obscurity Andrews's death was just the opposite. He was something of a local celebrity and his cremation was well attended and reported in the local newspapers.

== First-class record ==
His season by season record for Somerset was as follows:

Season	M	I	NO	Runs	HS	Ave	Runs	Wkts	BB	Ave
1930	10	17	7	47	9	4.70	789	18	4-87	43.83
1931	19	30	16	107	21*	7.64	963	27	5-52	35.66
1932	20	29	5	383	45	15.95	880	31	4-31	28.38
1935	28	46	4	617	71	14.69	2281	108	7-29	21.12
1936	28	44	0	632	59	14.36	1978	82	6-22	24.12
1937	29	56	4	1063	80	20.44	2702	137	8-12	19.72
1938	29	46	1	1001	77*	22.24	2704	124	7-58	21.80
1939	28	44	4	569	57	14.22	2805	131	7-56	21.41
1946	25	32	7	260	65	10.40	1721	68	8-25	25.30
1947	10	17	3	154	52*	11.00	718	24	7-44	29.91
Totals	226	361	51	4833	80	15.59	17541	750	8-12	23.38

His first-class career included matches at the Folkestone festival in 1937, the Hastings festival in 1946 and the Harrogate festival in 1947 where he played his final matches.
