= William Robertson (Middlesex cricketer) =

English cricketer (1879–1950)

Personal information
- Full name: William Parish Robertson
- Born: 5 September 1879; Lima, Peru
- Died: 7 May 1950 (aged 70); Debden, Essex, England
- Batting: Right-handed
- Role: Wicket-keeper

Domestic team information
- Years: Team
- 1900–1919: Middlesex
- 1901: Cambridge University
- First-class debut: 11 May 1899 AJ Webbe's XI v Cambridge University
- Last First-class: 30 July 1919 Middlesex v Kent

Career statistics
Competition	First-class
Matches	116
Runs scored	4,510
Batting average	25.91
100s/50s	4/22
Top score	130
Catches/stumpings	61/15
- Source: CricketArchive, 18 September 2011

William Parish Robertson (5 September 1879 – 7 May 1950) was an English cricketer who played first-class cricket for Middlesex County Cricket Club between 1900 and 1919.

Robertson was educated at Harrow School and Trinity Hall, Cambridge.

A wicket-keeper, Robertson also played as a right-handed batsman. He scored 4,510 runs and claimed 61 catches and 15 stumpings in first-class cricket.
