= Simon Turner (cricketer) =

English cricketer

Simon Jonathan Turner (born 28 April 1960) played first-class and List A cricket for Somerset in 1984 and 1985. He was born at Cuckfield, West Sussex.

In first-class and List A cricket, Turner played as a left-handed lower-order batsman and wicketkeeper, acting as deputy to Trevor Gard in two spells – the month of July 1984 and a week in June 1985 – when Gard was injured. He made some useful runs in first-class matches with a highest score of 27 not out in the game against Glamorgan at Taunton in 1984. He was less successful with the bat in one-day matches.

Turner's younger brother, Rob, was Somerset's regular wicketkeeper for 15 years from 1991 to 2005. Simon Turner played high-calibre club cricket for Weston-super-Mare Cricket Club for more than 20 years from 1978, and his brother also played for the club. Turner has also played a handful of games for Axbridge cricket club in 2010 and 2011. The latest game for Axbridge was 11 September 2011 vs Horrington scoring 30 not out from 38 balls.
