= North Somerset Cricket League =

The North Somerset Cricket League (NSCL) is a cricket league in England serving the North Somerset, Bristol and South Gloucestershire area.

== History ==
The NSCL was founded in 1969, with the first season taking place the following year. The aim of the league was to provide competitive cricket, with the hope of maintaining the interest of youngsters in the sport.

There were six original members of the league; Chew Magna, Chew Stoke, High Littleton, Nailsea, Whitchurch and Stanton Drew; and the first match took place on 19 April 1970 between Stanton Drew and Chew Magna. From these small beginnings, the league has grown, and now comprises over 80 teams, playing in 9 divisions.

Due to this expansion, and the desire of teams to play on different days, in 2007 the divisional structure was reorganised into Saturday and Sunday conferences. In 2009 a Sunday Premier Division was introduced, which allowed teams from higher leagues (such as the West of England Premier League) to compete without unbalancing the rest of the divisions.

== Past winners ==
=== Saturday Conference Division 1 ===
- 2007 Dyrham & Hinton
- 2008 Dyrham & Hinton
- 2009 Dyrham & Hinton
- 2010 Wrington
- 2011 Bear Flat
- 2012 Bear Flat

=== Sunday Conference Premier Division ===
- 2009 Keynsham CC
- 2010 Brislington CC
- 2011 Midsomer Norton CC
- 2012 Lansdown CC

=== Sunday Conference Division 1 ===
- 2007 Keynsham
- 2008 Knowle
- 2009 Whitchurch CC, Somerset
- 2010 Whitchurch CC, Somerset
- 2011 Whitchurch CC, Somerset
- 2012 Bristol Bangladeshi's

=== Division 1 (pre-2007) ===
- 1970 Chew Stoke
- 1971 Chew Stoke
- 1972 Nailsea
- 1973 Barrow Gurney
- 1974 Barrow Gurney
- 1975 Headley Park
- 1976 Headley Park
- 1977 Lower Weston Sports
- 1978 Headley Park
- 1979 Barrow Gurney
- 1980 Headley Park
- 1981 Bishop Sutton
- 1982 Headley Park
- 1983 Brislington
- 1984 Weston-super-Mare 3
- 1985 Barrow Gurney
- 1986 Bishop Sutton
- 1987 Bishop Sutton
- 1988 Bishop Sutton
- 1989 Wrington
- 1990 Wrington
- 1991 Weston-super-Mare 3
- 1992 Exiles (Bath)
- 1993 Wrington
- 1994 Brislington
- 1995 Weston-super-Mare 3
- 1996 Stratton on Fosse
- 1997 Stratton on Fosse
- 1998 Stratton on Fosse
- 1999 Mells
- 2000 Bear Flat
- 2001 Harptree
- 2002 Bear Flat
- 2003 Bear Flat
- 2004 Stratton on Fosse
- 2005 Stratton on Fosse
- 2006 Bath 3
