= Jack Lee (cricketer) =

English cricketer (1902–1944)

Personal information
- Full name: John William Lee
- Born: 1 February 1902; London, England
- Died: 20 June 1944 (aged 42) near Bazenville, Normandy, German-occupied France
- Batting: Right-handed
- Bowling: Legbreak
- Role: All-rounder
- Relatives: Frank Lee (brother); Harry Lee (brother)

Domestic team information
- Years: Team
- 1923: Middlesex
- 1925–1936: Somerset
- FC debut: 27 June 1923 Middlesex v Somerset
- Last FC: 19 August 1936 Somerset v Essex

Career statistics
Competition	First-class
Matches	243
Runs scored	7,856
Batting average	21.00
100s/50s	6/36
Top score	193*
Balls bowled	38,174
Wickets	495
Bowling average	29.74
5 wickets in innings	19
10 wickets in match	2
Best bowling	7/45
Catches/stumpings	122/–
- Source: CricketArchive, 15 October 2009

John William Lee (1 February 1902 – 20 June 1944), generally known as Jack Lee, was an English cricketer who played for Somerset from 1925 to 1936, having played one match for Middlesex in 1923. He was an all-rounder, scoring six centuries and taking ten wickets in a match on two occasions by the end of his career. He was killed on active service with the British Army during the Second World War.

== Cricket career ==
=== Early career ===
Lee was a Londoner and played one match in 1923 for Middlesex, where his brother, Harry, 12 years his senior, was an opening batsman and off-break bowler from 1911 to 1934. The Middlesex match was against Somerset at Taunton, and Lee failed to take a wicket with his leg-breaks and, batting at number ten, was run out without scoring. Unable to win a place in the Middlesex side, he moved to Somerset from the 1925 season, starting his career with his new county in almost identical circumstances, with just one wicket for his bowling and two scoreless innings in the match against Cambridge University at Bath. That was his only first-class match in his first two seasons at Somerset: without a residential or birth qualification, he was forced to wait for two years before he could appear in County Championship matches. While waiting, he played club cricket for the Lansdown Cricket Club in Bath. Two years after Jack Lee moved from Middlesex to Somerset, his younger brother Frank, who had made two appearances for Middlesex, made the same move: he also played for Lansdown and his qualification for Somerset proceeded two years behind Jack's.

Jack Lee was qualified for Somerset in 1927 and immediately became a regular player in the side. In his first County Championship match, he was used as an opening batsman, and he stayed at or near the top of the batting order for most of the season, moving down only when one of Somerset's amateur irregulars arrived to claim one of the opening slots. In his first season, he made 759 runs at an average of 17.25 runs per innings and a highest score of 65. He also took 41 wickets, including five for 23 in an innings in the match against Warwickshire when, in Wisden's report, "he bowled an excellent length and with some variety of pace made the ball turn quickly". In its review of Somerset's season, Wisden added that Lee had made "an encouraging start" and "may develop into a thoroughly good all-round player".

That promise was slow to develop, however. In the 1928 season, Lee made only 376 first-class runs at an average of 14.46 and took only 19 wickets. He played in only 17 of Somerset's matches, with the team often containing eight or nine amateur players. He was back as a regular in 1929, and took 59 wickets, including a new career-best of six for 57 in the match against Northamptonshire at Taunton. In that match, though, Lee batted at number eleven, and though he also opened the innings in other matches, his season's batting average in 1929 was just 12.90. There was little change in 1930, and although Wisden noted that Lee on occasion offered "batting to some purpose", he was now not used higher than number seven in the batting order, and he missed several matches in August when the amateurs were available. As a bowler in 1930, he had one outstanding match: against Essex at Colchester, he took five wickets for 38 in the first Essex innings, catching three of the other Essex batsmen, and then followed that with seven for 101, his best innings figures so far, to finish with 12 for 139 in the match, the best match figures of his career. It was perhaps significant that Somerset captain (and England off-spin bowler) Jack White was not playing in this game: in the 1930 season as a whole, White bowled 500 more overs for Somerset than Lee, who was the number two spin bowler for as long as White was in the side.

=== All-round cricketer ===
The transition to all-rounder happened in the 1931 season. From early in the season, Lee was promoted to open the innings or to bat at number three, and though the move was not an instant success, it paid off from June. In the match against Middlesex at Lord's, he finally overhauled the highest score of 65 he had made in 1927 by scoring 71 in a very heavy defeat. In the very next match, against the New Zealanders at Bath, he improved that score again, making 98 in three hours. And then at the end of the same month of June 1931, opening the innings alongside his brother Frank, he made 113, his first century, in the game against Northamptonshire at Northampton. In the season as a whole, Lee made 994 runs at an average of 21.60, six runs per innings higher than his average in 1930. Alongside that, he took 53 wickets in the season, though with no five-wicket innings. Wisden was more impressed by the improvement in the batting of Lee's younger brother, Frank, but noted: "J. W. Lee, if unenterprising, batted consistently," and added, a paragraph further on: "J. W. Lee, if often expensive with his slows, proved effective at times."

The praise from Wisden for Lee's performance in 1932 was rather less grudging: "Jack Lee fully maintained his ability as a batsman," it said. Lee's overall figures were similar to those of 1931, with 949 runs at 21.56. There was again a single century, this time in the match against Essex at Leyton, and Lee put on 234 for the first wicket with his brother, Frank, an opening partnership somewhat overshadowed by the record 555-run first-wicket partnership by Yorkshire's Percy Holmes and Herbert Sutcliffe on the same ground just two weeks earlier. There was an advance, though, in Lee's bowling: White had retired from the Somerset captaincy after the 1931 season and played in only half the county's matches, and Lee had more bowling to do, responding with 67 wickets at, for him, the low average of 25.88 runs per wicket.

Lee's bowling was less successful in 1933, and he took just 45 wickets at the much higher average of 41.15. But that decline was offset by a further advance in batting, and he passed 1000 runs for the season for the first time, finishing with 1122 and an average of 27.36. In the match against Worcestershire at Weston-super-Mare, he made an unbeaten 193 in six hours and 40 minutes: the match was finished by a heavy storm when Somerset had lost seven wickets, with Lee still batting. This was the highest score of Lee's first-class cricket career. During the Middlesex v Somerset match at Lord's in 1933, he was involved in one of the curiosities of first-class cricket. He claimed the wicket of his elder brother Harry, with the catch being taken by younger brother Frank.

The 1934 season was Lee's most successful in first-class cricket in terms of runs scored, batting average and wickets taken. Wisden said he was "far and away the best all-rounder in the side". His aggregate of runs increased to 1465 and his average to 31.17, and there were three centuries, as many as he had made in his career before the season began. In Somerset's first home match of the season, against Kent at Taunton, he carried his bat for 135 out of a Somerset total of 352, an innings described by Wisden as "watchful" and that featured a 10th wicket partnership with wicket-keeper Wally Luckes of 112. Later in the season he shared century opening partnerships with his brother Frank in three consecutive matches, who also enjoyed his most successful season so far. Wisden noted: "Between them, they made seven of the eleven individual centuries registered for the county... It cannot be said that they were, as a rule, attractive to watch, but extra care could be excused in view of the knowledge that failure on their part probably—and usually—meant the cheap dismissal of the side." As a bowler, he took 77 wickets at an average of 28.74, and was Somerset's leading wicket-taker. In the match against Essex at Colchester, he achieved his best innings and match bowling figures, his five for 75 in the first Essex innings being followed by seven for 45 in the second – though Somerset still managed to lose the game.

Both the Lee brothers were less successful as batsmen in the 1935 season, and Jack only just completed 1000 runs for the season, finishing with 1011 at an average of 22.46 and failing to score a single century. With fast bowler Arthur Wellard, who had been badly out of form in 1934, taking more than 100 wickets, there was less reliance on Lee's bowling, but he still finished with 72 wickets and his bowling average of 24.38 was the best for a single season of his first-class career. In Harold Gimblett's sensational debut match at Frome in May 1935, Lee was Somerset's most successful bowler, taking nine Essex wickets to win the game.

=== End of first-class career ===
After the 1935 season Lee accepted the position of head cricket coach at Mill Hill School in north London. His departure was controversial: the biography of Harold Gimblett, written by the historian of Somerset County Cricket Club, David Foot, reported more than 40 years after the event that "old players still grumble about the way Jack Lee departed". Gimblett told Foot, in tape recordings that form the basis of the biography, that Lee had been vocal about the disparities in treatment between the amateurs who still formed a large percentage of the Somerset side and the half dozen professional cricketers the county employed; Gimblett also said that Lee felt he was due a benefit match. When Lee approached the Somerset secretary, the former captain John Daniell, to say he had been offered the job at Mill Hill, in reality "he wanted to remain with Somerset... Should he take the job? Yes, he was apparently advised." To Gimblett and other Somerset professionals, Foot wrote, this indicated that the county officials were "offhanded in their treatment of the pros", and particularly of one with a history of being disrespectful of the amateurs.

Daniell's son Nigel, however, gave Foot a different perspective on Lee's departure. "In fairness to him, they thought he should seriously consider the job at Mill Hill," he is quoted in Foot's Somerset history as saying. "They felt the school appointment would long outlast his career as a county cricketer."

Either way, Lee reappeared for Somerset in five matches in the school holidays in August 1936, and his appearance along with that of some "more experienced amateurs" was deemed responsible by Wisden for a "transformation" in Somerset's fortunes late in the season that led to seventh place in the County Championship, the highest for four years. In Lee's final match for Somerset, he top-scored with 57 out of a total of 132 in a heavy defeat by Essex. He did not return to play for Somerset in the three other seasons leading up to the Second World War, and did not appear in first-class cricket again.

== Second World War ==
During the Second World War Lee joined the British Army, serving as a private with the Pioneer Corps. On 20 June 1944, a fortnight after D-Day, he was a member of 208 Company when he was killed in France during the Invasion of Normandy. He is buried in Ryes War Cemetery, Bazenville. He left a widow, Agnes, who was living in Highgate, London. During the early part of the war he played for the London Counties, when this closed down on the resumption of the County Championship in 1946, the club's remaining funds were given to Agnes.

== Bibliography ==
- David Foot (1986). Sunshine, Sixes and Cider: The History of Somerset Cricket (1986 ed.). David & Charles. ISBN 0-7153-8890-8.
