= Bertie Buse =

Personal information
- Full name: Herbert Francis Thomas Buse
- Born: 5 August 1910; Ashley Down, Bristol, England
- Died: 23 February 1992 (aged 81); Bath, Somerset, England
- Batting: Right-handed
- Bowling: Right-arm medium
- Role: All-rounder

Domestic team information
- Years: Team
- 1929–1953: Somerset
- FC debut: 17 July 1929 Somerset v Surrey
- Last FC: 11 August 1953 Somerset v Essex

Career statistics
Competition	First-class
Matches	304
Runs scored	10,623
Batting average	22.69
100s/50s	7/47
Top score	132
Balls bowled	43,818
Wickets	657
Bowling average	28.77
5 wickets in innings	20
10 wickets in match	0
Best bowling	8/41
Catches/stumpings	151/–
- Source: CricketArchive, 3 February 2008

Herbert Francis Thomas Buse (1910–1992) was a cricketer who played 304 first-class matches for Somerset before and after the Second World War.

== Cricket career ==
Born at Ashley Down, Bristol, on 5 August 1910, Buse was an all-rounder: a dogged right-handed batsman who, in the mobile Somerset batting line-up of the mid 20th century, batted anywhere from No 3 to No 8, and a medium-paced swing bowler who often opened the bowling for the county side. He first played for Somerset in 1929, and then played occasional matches as a professional almost every season through to 1937. In 1938, he went on to the county's staff as a full professional contracted for all matches, and from then until he retired at the end of the 1953 season he was a regular in the county team.

Buse's first complete season was 1938 and, according to Wisden, he "seized his chance in great style". In his first season, he scored 1067 runs and took 61 wickets, and his 132 against Northamptonshire at Kettering was to remain his highest first-class score. Wisden noted that he often batted best when Somerset were in trouble.

That first full season set the pattern for the next nine: the 1939 season before the Second World War and the first eight seasons from 1946 after the war. Buse made 1,000 runs in five seasons in all, and more than 900 runs in three others; his batting average never exceeded 27 and never fell below 19; and he scored seven centuries in all. As a bowler, his best season was 1939, when he took 81 first-class wickets, including his career best eight for 41 in an innings against Derbyshire at Taunton. In eight seasons in all he took more than 50 wickets, and though his average was, for his time, rather high – usually around 30 runs per wicket – he again with his bowling seemed often to do well when others were struggling.

== Cricket style ==
Buse was one of the distinctive characters in a Somerset side full of characters. In appearance and manner, he was bustling and rather prim, with a clipped moustache and always-neat hair. As a bowler, he went through a variety of fussy mannerisms before delivering the ball, all of which served only to endear him to Somerset cricket crowds. "There was his studious contemplation, his stuttering approach, the touch of acceleration and the undisguised smile when the batsman failed to counter the late swing," is one description. John Arlott said Buse's run-up was like a butler bringing in the tea. He could bowl both outswingers and inswingers. As a batsman, Buse also had a distinctive style that involved a strange dabbing stroke that steered the ball through the slips or gully towards third man. "There was rather too much posterior," says one book.

== Benefit match ==
Buse was accorded a benefit match by Somerset in his final first-class season, 1953, and picked the three-day County Championship game against Lancashire at Bath. The match was a sensation, though not to Buse's gain. At the root of the sensation was a newly-laid pitch, which took vicious spin from the start of play. Lancashire's acting captain, the England Test batsman Cyril Washbrook, said later that Lancashire would have refused to play had it not been a benefit match.

Somerset batted first and were all out in around 90 minutes for just 55. Off-spin bowler Roy Tattersall unusually opened the bowling, and took seven for 25. No Somerset batsman reached double figures, and Buse made just five. When Lancashire batted, Buse himself proved almost as deadly, taking four of the first five wickets that fell for just 46 runs. But then Peter Marner and Alan Wharton decided to hit out, and put on a stand of 70 in 25 minutes for the sixth wicket. In all, Lancashire totalled 158, made off just 32 overs, with Buse taking six for 41 and the innings finishing by teatime on the first day. Somerset's second innings then proved no better than the first, with Brian Statham joining Tattersall in the wickets. Only a last-wicket partnership of 35 by Jim Redman and the debutant Brian Langford delayed matters at all. Somerset were all out for 79, losing by an innings and 24 runs, with Tattersall having match figures of 13 wickets for 69 runs. The game was over by six o'clock on the evening of the first day.

With the beneficiary responsible for outgoings as well as income from a benefit match, Buse faced financial disaster from the match. But Somerset waived the match costs and a fund was set up to recompense Buse which raised around £2,800, the kind of sum he might have expected from a game that ran the intended three days.

Buse and Somerset returned to Bath for the second match of the cricket festival later that same week. This time, playing against Kent, two innings were completed on the first day, but then Somerset posted a total of more than 400 in their second innings, with both Buse and Harold Gimblett making centuries.

== Outside cricket ==
Though born in Bristol, most of Buse's life was spent in Bath, where he played club cricket for Bath Cricket Club. He was employed as a solicitor's clerk in the city: Bath solicitors provided Somerset's cricket captains from 1932 to 1946.

Outside cricket, he was an all-round sportsman, appearing for Bath rugby club at full-back and also playing table tennis and billiards to high standard. After retiring from cricket, he coached in South Africa (at King Edward VII School in Johannesburg his pupils included Ali Bacher) and ran a pub for a while before returning to Bath to work on the local evening newspaper. He died in Bath on 23 February 1992
