= Weston-super-Mare Cricket Club =

Coordinates: 51°19′44″N 2°58′25″W

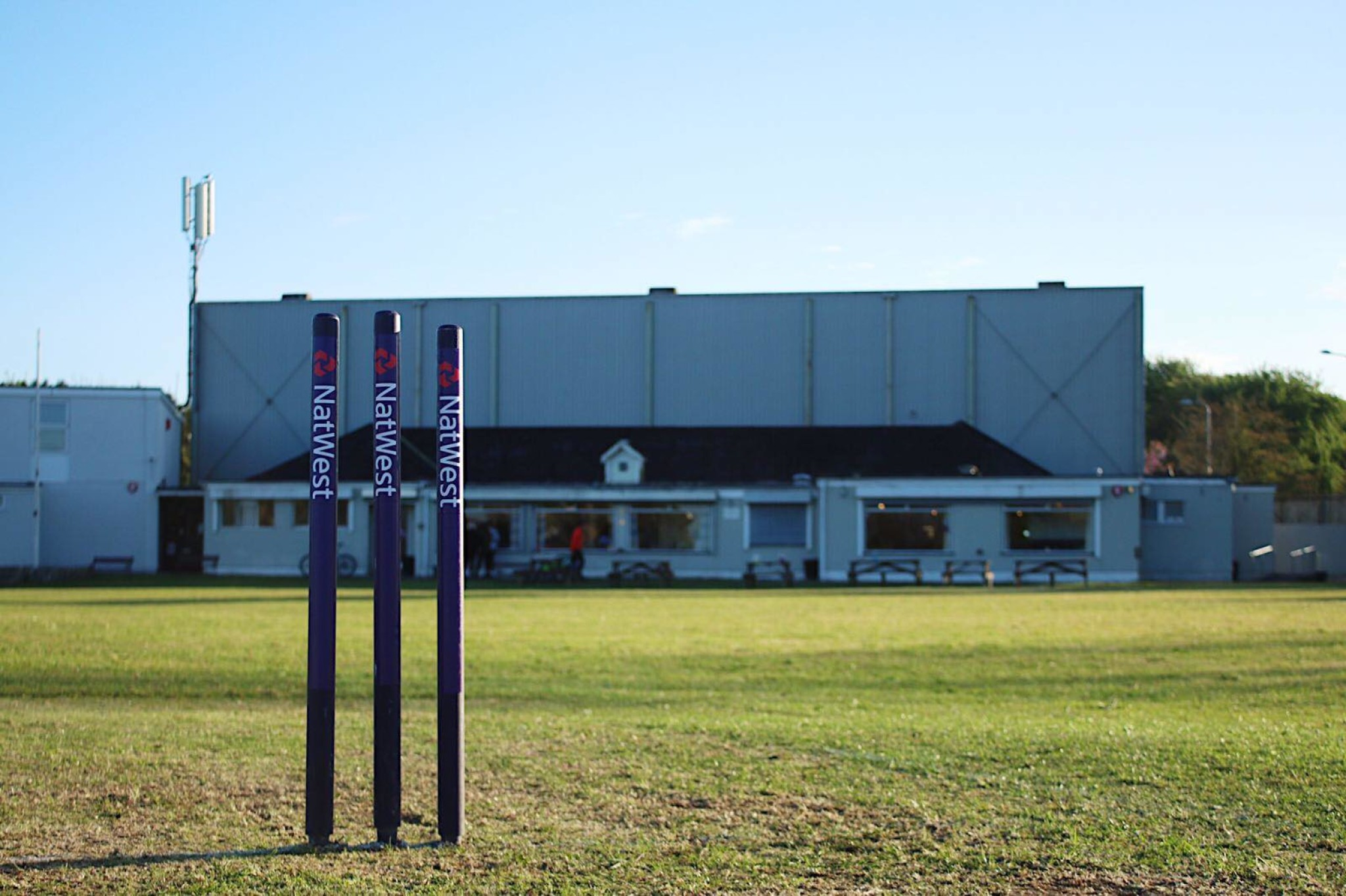

Personnel
- Captain: Chris Davidson

Team information
- Colours: Maroon, Green & Silver
- Established: 1845
- Home venue: Devonshire Road
- Official website: www.westoncricketclub.co.uk

Weston-super-Mare Cricket Club is an amateur cricket club based in the town of Weston-super-Mare, Somerset, England. Since the club's formation in 1845, they have nurtured a number of players who have gone on to play for Somerset County Cricket Club and a select few who have gone on to play for the England Cricket Team. The first team currently play in the West of England Premier League, an ECB Premier League, the highest level of recreational club cricket in England and Wales.

The club's finest hour came in 1986, when they were runners-up in the ECB National Club Cricket Championship, losing to Stourbridge at Lord's.

The club's home matches are played at the Devonshire Park Ground in Weston-super-Mare, which has hosted two List A matches involving Somerset in the John Player League, and several other matches involving Somerset's Second XI.

== Senior honours ==
- ECB National Club Cricket Championship
  - Runners-Up (1): 1986
- West of England Premier League
  - Premier One Runners-Up (1): 2009
  - Premier Two Winners (1): 2006
  - Premier Two Runners-Up (2): 2002, 2013
  - Somerset Division Winners (1): 2017
  - Premier One 2nd XI Runners-Up (1): 2008
  - Premier Two 2nd XI Winners (3): 2001, 2002, 2012
- Western League
  - Winners (1): 1991
  - Runners-Up (2): 1989, 1990
  - 2nd XI Championship Winners (3): 1989, 1990, 1991
- Alliance League
  - 1st XI Winners (1): 1986
  - 2nd XI Winners (1): 1986
- Somerset Cricket League
  - Premier Division Winners (1): 1985
  - Premier Division Runners-Up (1): 1982
  - Division One 2nd XI Winners (2): 1984, 1985
  - Division One 2nd XI Runners-Up (2): 1982, 1983
  - Division Six Runners-Up (1): 2017
- Somerset Major Cup
  - Winners (4): 1971, 1983, 2008, 2014
  - Runners-Up (2): 2007, 2012
- Somerset Intermediate Cup
  - Winners (4): 1990, 1991, 1993, 2001
  - Runners-Up (3): 2004, 2006, 2011
- Somerset Minor Cup
  - Winners (3): 1984, 1985, 1986
- Steelstock Major Cup
  - Winners (3): 1987, 1989, 1991
- Steelstock Minor Cup
  - Winners (2): 1986, 1988
- North Somerset Cricket League
  - Division 1 Winners (3): 1984, 1991, 1995
  - Division 2 Winners (1): 1983
  - Division 3 Winners (1): 1984
  - Division 3 Runners-Up (1): 2008
- Somerset Ladies Cricket League
  - Winners (4): 1998, 2007, 2010, 2011
  - Runners-Up (2): 2006, 2013

== Youth honours ==
- North Somerset Youth Cricket League
  - U17 Winners (11): 1985, 1987, 1989, 1993, 1994, 1999, 2000, 2004, 2005, 2006, 2008
  - U17 Runners-Up (2): 2001, 2011
  - U15 Winners (9): 1985, 1992, 1993, 1996, 1998, 2002, 2005, 2006, 2017, 2019
  - U13 Winners (8): 1991, 1993, 1994, 1995, 1996, 2004, 2007, 2013, 2019
  - U11 Winners (7): 1995, 2005, 2006, 2007, 2008, 2011, 2015
  - U11 Runners-Up (1): 2017
- North Somerset Youth Cricket Cup
  - U17 Winners (18): 1965, 1968, 1971, 1973, 1975, 1978, 1981, 1984, 1985, 1987, 1988, 1994, 1995, 1999, 2000, 2004, 2008, 2011
  - U15 Winners (6): 1996, 1997, 1999, 2002, 2006, 2009, 2019
  - U13 Winners (8): 1986, 1990, 1991, 1993, 1995, 1996, 1997, 2004, 2018, 2019
- North Somerset Youth Cricket Plate
  - U15 Winners (1): 2017
  - U13 Winners (1): 2017
  - U13 Runners-Up: 2019

== Notable current and former players ==
- Nick Evans - Formerly of Somerset
- Ryan Davies - Formerly of Durham, Somerset, England U19s and Kent
- Robin d'Souza - Currently of the Goa cricket team
- Gemaal Hussain - Formerly of Somerset and Gloucestershire
- Jon Moss - Formerly of Victorian Bushrangers and Derbyshire
- Michael Munday - Formerly of Somerset
- Perry Rendell - Formerly of Somerset & Combined Universities
- Brian Rose - Formerly of Somerset County Cricket Club and England, and previously Somerset Director of Cricket
- David Stiff - Formerly of Somerset, Yorkshire, Leicestershire and Kent
- Peter Trego - Formerly of Nottinghamshire, Somerset, Kent and Middlesex
- Rob Turner - Formerly of Somerset and England A
- Simon Turner - Formerly of Somerset
- Charl Willoughby - Formerly of South Africa, Somerset, Leicestershire & Essex
- Paul van Meekeren - Currently of Gloucestershire and Holland, formerly of Somerset and Durham.
