= Frank Lee (cricketer) =

English cricketer and umpire

Personal information
- Full name: Frank Stanley Lee
- Born: 24 July 1905; London, England
- Died: 30 March 1982 (aged 76); London, England
- Batting: Left-handed
- Bowling: Right-arm medium
- Role: Batsman, occasional wicket-keeper
- Relatives: Jack Lee (brother); Harry Lee (brother)

Domestic team information
- Years: Team
- 1925: Middlesex
- 1929–1947: Somerset
- FC debut: 3 June 1925 MCC v Wales
- Last FC: 23 August 1947 Somerset v Kent

Umpiring information
- Tests umpired: 29 (1949–1962)

Career statistics
Competition	First-class
Matches	331
Runs scored	15,310
Batting average	27.93
100s/50s	23/68
Top score	169
Balls bowled	1,363
Wickets	25
Bowling average	34.48
5 wickets in innings	1
10 wickets in match	0
Best bowling	5/53
Catches/stumpings	159/12
- Source: CricketArchive, 7 October 2009

Frank Stanley Lee (24 July 1905 – 30 March 1982) was an English first-class cricketer and an umpire who officiated in Test matches.

As a player, Lee was a solid, rather slow-scoring left-handed opening batsman. He played a couple of matches for Middlesex in 1925, but unable to command a regular place in the side he moved to Somerset, where he became qualified to play in 1929. He scored 107 in his third match for his new county, and though he struggled for runs in 1930 and did not complete 1,000 runs in a season for the first time until 1933, he was then a regular in the side until he retired after the 1947 season.

His best batting year was 1938, when he scored 2,019 runs at an average of 44.86. He bowled only occasionally, but against Warwickshire at Taunton in 1933 he took five wickets for 53 runs. For several seasons right up to his retirement, he acted as reserve wicketkeeper if regular Somerset keeper Wally Luckes was ill or injured.

Lee's first first-class match as an umpire came while he was still a player: he stood in the Somerset match with Cambridge University at Bath in 1947, and then played in the other matches of the Bath cricket festival. He then joined the first-class umpires' list for 1948 and a year later stood in the first of 29 Test matches.

His most controversial Test match was the game at Lord's in 1960 between England and South Africa when he no-balled the South African fast-medium bowler Geoff Griffin 11 times for throwing. He and other umpires had already called Griffin for throwing earlier in the season, but this was the first time a touring team bowler had been called in a Test match. When the Lord's Test ended early, Lee's fellow umpire Syd Buller called Griffin again in the "friendly" match that was arranged to fill in the time, and the action of both umpires was instrumental in ending Griffin's career and in bringing to a head the problems of throwing and dragging that had affected international cricket for several years.

Lee officiated in Tests until the end of the 1962 season, and retired from umpiring in first-class matches at the end of the 1963 season. His last match of any consequence as an umpire was the first-ever Gillette Cup final.

Lee's brothers also played first-class cricket. Harry Lee, 15 years older than Frank Lee, was a batsman and spin bowler for Middlesex from 1911 to 1934 and played in one Test match. Jack Lee, three years older than Frank, played fleetingly for Middlesex and then pioneered the route down to Somerset, where he and Frank often opened the batting together.
