= Agricultural Showgrounds, Frome =

Cricket ground in Frome, England

Agricultural Showgrounds
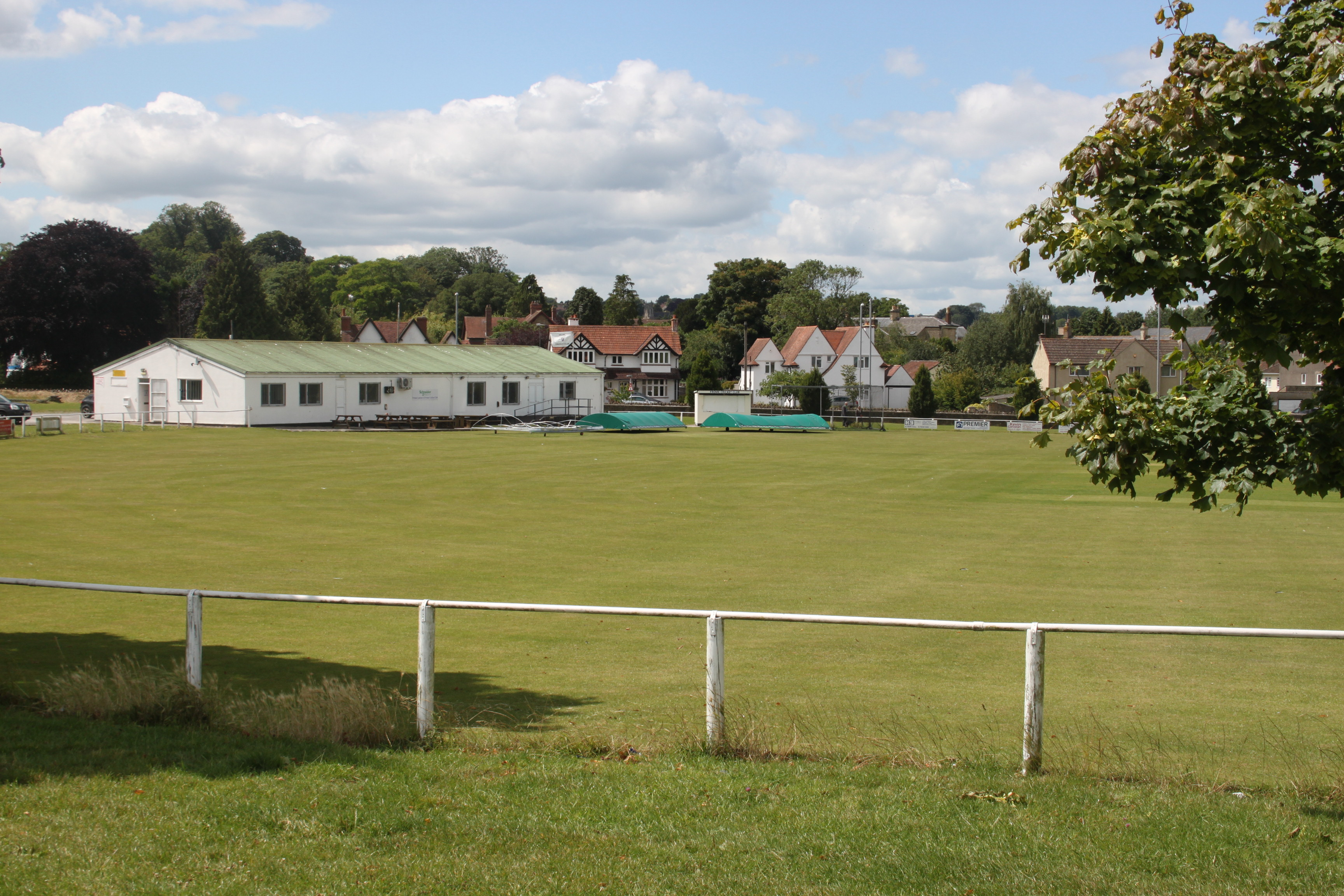
- Ground and pavilion in 2015

Ground information
- Location: Frome, Somerset
- Coordinates: 51.2362°N 2.3124°W
- Establishment: 1882 (first recorded match)

Team information
Frome Cricket Club	(1925–present)
Somerset County Cricket Club	(1932–1970)
- As of 30 August 2010; Source: Ground profile

Agricultural Showgrounds is a cricket ground in Frome, Somerset, England. The first recorded match on the ground was in 1882, when Frome played United Eleven. In 1932, Somerset played Northamptonshire in the County Championship, in what was the ground's first first-class match. From 1932 to 1961, the ground played host to 18 first-class matches, with the final first-class match held at the ground between Somerset and Hampshire.

The ground also hosted a single List-A match in 1970, which was between Somerset and Leicestershire in the 1970 John Player League. The Agricultural Showgrounds ground has also played host to Somerset Second XI matches in the Minor Counties Championship and Second XI Championship.

In local cricket, the ground is the home venue of Frome Cricket Club who play in the Bristol and the Somerset Division of the West of England Premier League.
