= Parliamentary constituencies in Suffolk =

The county of Suffolk in relation to England

The county of Suffolk is divided into 8 parliamentary constituencies: 1 borough constituency and 7 county constituencies. Seven constituencies lie wholly within Suffolk while Waveney Valley straddles the county border between Suffolk and Norfolk. (Note: Waveney Valley CC is a cross-county constituency between Suffolk and Norfolk, covering areas of East and Mid Suffolk, as well as electoral wards of South Norfolk.)

== Constituencies ==
† Conservative ‡ Labour ¥ Green

Constituency (Note: BC denotes borough constituency, CC denotes county constituency.)	Electorate	Majority (Note: The majority is the number of votes the winning candidate receives more than their nearest rival.)	Member of Parliament	Nearest opposition	Map
Bury St Edmunds and Stowmarket CC	76,655	1,452	Peter Prinsley ‡	Will Tanner †	Location of Bury St Edmunds and Stowmarket Constituency in Suffolk following the 2023 Boundary Review
Central Suffolk and North Ipswich CC	71,020	4,290	Patrick Spencer †	Kevin Craig ‡	Location of Central Suffolk and North Ipswich Constituency in Suffolk following the 2023 Boundary Review
Ipswich BC	75,117	7,403	Jack Abbott ‡	Tom Hunt †	Location of Ipswich Constituency in Suffolk following the 2023 Boundary Review
Lowestoft CC	73,967	2,016	Jessica Asato ‡	Peter Aldous †	Location of Lowestoft Constituency in Suffolk following the 2023 Boundary Review
South Suffolk CC	71,170	3,047	James Cartlidge †	Emma Bishton ‡	Location of South Suffolk Constituency in Suffolk following the 2023 Boundary Review
Suffolk Coastal CC	72,663	1,070	Jenny Riddell-Carpenter ‡	Thérèse Coffey †	Location of Suffolk Coastal Constituency in Suffolk following the 2023 Boundary Review
Waveney Valley CC	70,540	5,593	Adrian Ramsay ¥	Richard Rout †	Location of Waveney Valley Constituency in Suffolk following the 2023 Boundary Review
West Suffolk CC	76,243	3,247	Nick Timothy †	Rebecca Denness ‡	Location of West Suffolk Constituency in Suffolk following the 2023 Boundary Review

== Boundary changes ==
=== 2024 ===
For the 2023 review of Westminster constituencies, which redrew the constituency map ahead of the 2024 United Kingdom general election, the Boundary Commission for England opted to combine Suffolk with Norfolk as a sub-region of the East of England region, with the creation of the cross-county boundary constituency of Waveney Valley. The seat of Waveney reverted to its former name of Lowestoft, and Bury St Edmunds was renamed Bury St Edmunds and Stowmarket.

Former name
1. Bury St Edmunds CC
2. Central Suffolk and North Ipswich CC
3. Ipswich BC
4. South Suffolk CC
5. Suffolk Coastal CC
6. Waveney CC
7. West Suffolk CC
Boundaries 2010–2024

Current name
1. Bury St Edmunds and Stowmarket CC
2. Central Suffolk and North Ipswich CC
3. Ipswich BC
4. Lowestoft CC
5. South Suffolk CC
6. Suffolk Coastal CC
7. Waveney Valley CC
8. West Suffolk CC
Boundaries 2024–present

=== 2010 ===
In the Fifth Review the Boundary Commission for England recommended that Suffolk retained its current constituencies, with changes only to reflect revisions to local authority ward boundaries and to reduce the electoral disparity between constituencies. The largest of these changes resulted in the effective transfer of one Borough of Ipswich ward from Central Suffolk and North Ipswich to the constituency of Ipswich.

Name
1. Bury St Edmunds CC
2. Central Suffolk and North Ipswich CC
3. Ipswich BC
4. South Suffolk CC
5. Suffolk Coastal CC
6. Waveney CC
7. West Suffolk CC
Boundaries 1997–2010

Boundaries 2010–2024

== Results history ==
Primary data source: House of Commons research briefing - General election results from 1918 to 2019

=== 2024 ===
The number of votes cast for each political party who fielded candidates in constituencies comprising Suffolk in the 2024 general election were as follows:

Party	Votes	%	Change from 2019	Seats	Change from 2019
Conservative	115,953	30.8%	▼29.3%	3	▼4
Labour	107,057	28.4%	▲4.5%	4	▲4
Reform	69,230	18.4%	▲18.0%	0	0
Greens	49,925	13.3%	▲6.9%	1	▲1
Liberal Democrats	31,160	8.3%	-	0	0
Others	3,342	0.9%	-	0	0
Total	376,667	100.0		8	

=== 2019 ===
The number of votes cast for each political party who fielded candidates in constituencies comprising Suffolk in the 2019 general election were as follows:

Party	Votes	%	Change from 2017	Seats	Change from 2017
Conservative	229,823	60.1%	▲2.9%	7	▲1
Labour	91,339	23.9%	▼8.7%	0	▼1
Liberal Democrats	31,633	8.3%	▲3.8%	0	0
Greens	24,490	6.4%	▲3.6%	0	0
Brexit	1,432	0.4%	new	0	0
Others	3,432	0.9%	▼2.0%	0	0
Total	382,149	100.0		7	

=== Percentage votes ===
Election year	1918	1922	1923	1924	1929	1931	1935	1945	1950	1951	1955	1959	1964	1966	1970	1974 (Feb)	1974 (Oct)	1979	1983	1987	1992	1997	2001	2005	2010	2015	2017	2019	2024
Conservative^{1}	48.9	45.6	47.6	54.8	43.6	67.0	62.6	39.7	42.1	49.1	49.6	48.4	45.6	46.6	52.5	44.0	45.5	51.4	52.5	52.5	49.9	37.6	40.7	41.7	46.2	50.7	57.2	60.1	30.8
Labour	12.2	25.8	23.9	20.0	23.3	25.0	32.4	38.2	39.8	43.9	46.6	41.1	38.2	43.2	38.7	31.7	35.1	33.7	22.1	23.2	28.7	40.2	39.7	31.8	21.3	23.5	32.6	23.9	28.4
Reform^{2}	-	-	-	-	-	-	-	-	-	-	-	-	-	-	-	-	-	-	-	-	-	-	-	-	-	-	-	0.4	18.4
Green Party	-	-	-	-	-	-	-	-	-	-	-	-	-	-	-	-	-	-	-	*	*	*	*	*	1.9	4.9	2.8	6.4	13.3
Liberal Democrat^{3}#	24.5	11.9	28.5	25.2	33.1	8.0	4.9	22.1	18.0	7.0	3.8	10.5	16.0	9.9	8.0	23.7	19.4	14.4	25.3	23.6	20.4	17.6	16.0	20.6	24.1	5.6	4.5	8.3	8.3
Coalition Liberal	14.4	16.7	-	-	-	-	-	-	-	-	-	-	-	-	-	-	-	-	-	-	-	-	-	-	-	-	-	-	-
UKIP	-	-	-	-	-	-	-	-	-	-	-	-	-	-	-	-	-	-	-	-	-	*	*	*	5.3	15.3	2.3	*	*
Other	-	-	-	-	-	-	-	-	0.1	-	-	-	0.1	0.3	0.8	0.5	-	0.5	0.1	0.6	1.1	4.6	3.6	6.0	1.2	0.1	0.5	0.9	0.9

^{1}Includes National Liberal Party from 1931 - 1966

^{2}As the Brexit Party in 2019

^{3}1918-1979 - Liberal; 1983 & 1987 - SDP–Liberal Alliance

* Included in Other

=== Seats ===
Election year	1950	1951	1955	1959	1964	1966	1970	1974 (Feb)	1974 (Oct)	1979	1983	1987	1992	1997	2001	2005	2010	2015	2017	2019	2024
Labour	2	2	2	1	1	1	0	0	1	1	1	0	1	2	2	2	0	0	1	0	4
Conservative^{1}	2	3	3	4	4	4	5	5	4	4	5	6	5	5	5	5	7	7	6	7	3
Greens	0	0	0	0	0	0	0	0	0	0	0	0	0	0	0	0	0	0	0	0	1 (Note: Includes the constituency of Waveney Valley, which also lies partly in Norfolk.)
Liberal Democrat^{2}	1	0	0	0	0	0	0	0	0	0	0	0	0	0	0	0	0	0	0	0	0
Total	5	5	5	5	5	5	5	5	5	5	6	6	6	7	7	7	7	7	7	7	8

^{1}Includes National Liberal Party up to 1966

^{2}1950-1979 - Liberal; 1983 & 1987 - SDP–Liberal Alliance

=== Maps ===
==== 1885-1910 ====
1885

1886

1892

1895

1900

1906

Jan 1910

Dec 1910

==== 1918-1945 ====
1918

1922

1923

1924

1929

1931

1935

1945

==== 1950-1979 ====
1950

1951

1955

1959

1964

1966

1970

1974 Feb

1974 Oct

1979

==== 1983-present ====
1983

1987

1992

1997

2001

2005

2010

2015

2017

2019

2024

== Timeline ==
Constituency	1295-1298	1298-1529	1529-1559	1559-1571	1571-1614	1614-1832	1832-1844	1844-1885	1885-1918	1918-1950	1950-1983	1983-1997	1997-
Aldeburgh					1571-1832								
Bury St Edmunds						1614-							
Central Suffolk												1983-1997	
Central Suffolk and North Ipswich													1997-
Dunwich		1298-1832											
East Suffolk							1832-1885						
Eye					1571-1983								
Ipswich	1295-												
Lowestoft									1885-1983				
Orford			1529-1832										
South Suffolk												1983-	
Stowmarket									1885-1918				
Sudbury				1559-1844					1885-1950				
Sudbury and Woodbridge											1950-1983		
Suffolk	1295-1832												
Suffolk Coastal												1983-	
Waveney												1983-	
West Suffolk							1832-1885						1997-
Woodbridge									1885-1950				

== Historical representation by party ==
A cell marked → (with a different colour background to the preceding cell) indicates that the previous MP continued to sit under a new party name.

=== 1885 to 1918 ===
Conservative Liberal Liberal Unionist

Constituency	1885	86	1886	91	1892	92	1895	1900	1906	06	07	Jan 1910	Dec 1910	14
Bury St Edmunds	F. Hervey					Cadogan		Greene	F. W. Hervey		Guinness			
Eye	Stevenson									Pearson				
Ipswich (Two members)	West	Charteris					Goddard							
Ipswich (Two members)	Collings	Dalrymple							Cobbold			Horne		Ganzoni
Lowestoft	Crossley		→		Foster			Lucas	Beauchamp			Foster	Beauchamp	
Stowmarket	Cobbold		Greene	Stern			Malcolm		Hardy			Goldsmith		
Sudbury	W. Quilter		→						Heaton-Armstrong			C. Quilter		
Woodbridge	Everett		Lloyd-Anstruther		Everett		Pretyman		Everett			Peel		

=== 1918 to 1950 ===
Coalition Liberal (1918-22) Conservative Independent Independent Liberal Labour Liberal National Liberal (1931-68)

Constituency	1918	20	1922	1923	1924	1929	31	1931	34	1935	38	42	44	1945
Bury St Edmunds	Guinness							Heilgers					Keatinge	Clifton-Brown
Eye	Lyle-Samuel		→	Vanneck		Granville	→					→		→
Ipswich	Ganzoni			Jackson	Ganzoni						Stokes			
Lowestoft	Beauchamp		Rentoul						Loftus					Evans
Sudbury	Howard		Mercer	Loverseed	Burton									Hamilton
Woodbridge	Peel	Churchman				Fison		Ross-Taylor						Hare

=== 1950 to 1983 ===
Conservative Labour Liberal

Constituency	1950	1951	1955	57	1959	63	64	1964	1966	1970	Feb 74	Oct 74	1979
Bury St Edmunds	Aitken						Griffiths						
Eye	Granville	Harrison											Gummer
Ipswich	Stokes			Foot						Money		Weetch	
Lowestoft	Evans				Prior								
Sudbury & Woodbridge	Hare					Stainton							

=== 1983 to present ===
Conservative Green Independent Labour

Constituency	1983	1987	1992	1997	2001	01	2005	2010	2015	2017	2019	22	24	2024
Bury St Edmunds / & Stowmarket ('24)	Griffiths		Spring	Ruffley					Churchill					Prinsley
Suffolk Coastal	Gummer							Coffey						Riddell-Carpenter
Ipswich	Weetch	Irvine	Cann			Mole		Gummer		Martin	Hunt			Abbott
Waveney / Lowestoft (2024)	Prior	Porter		Blizzard				Aldous						Asato
South Suffolk	Yeo								Cartlidge					
Central Suffolk / & N Ipswich ('97)	Lord							Poulter					→	Spencer
West Suffolk				Spring				Hancock				→	→	Timothy
Waveney Valley^{1}														Ramsay

^{1}parts also in Norfolk

== See also ==
- Parliamentary constituencies in the East of England
- History of parliamentary constituencies and boundaries in Suffolk
