= Quilter (disambiguation) =

A quilter is someone who practices the art of quilting.

Quilter may also refer to

== People ==
- Ben Quilter (born 1981), British Paralympic judoka
- Chuck Quilter (1926–2014), American and Canadian football player
- David Quilter (born 1942), British actor
- Harry Quilter (1851–1907), English art critic, writer and artist
- Dame Helene Elizabeth Quilter, New Zealand public servant
- James Barney Quilter (1919–2005), American politician
- Laura Quilter (born 1968), American writer, lawyer, and archivist
- Mary Ruth Quilter (1945–1979), English model and pornographic actress known as Mary Millington
- Mike Quilter, New Zealand sailor
- Peter Quilter (born 1965), British playwright
- Roger Quilter (1877–1953), British composer
- Sir William Cuthbert Quilter, 1st Baronet (1841–1911), English stockbroker, art collector and politician, brother of Harry, father of Cuthbert and Roger
- Sir William Eley Cuthbert Quilter, 2nd Baronet (1873–1952), English politician

== Other uses ==
- Quilter baronets, a title in the Baronetage of the United Kingdom
- Quilter Cup, a rugby union trophy in the United Kingdom
- Quilter Labs, American guitar amplifier manufacturer
- Quilter plc, British financial services company
