= Wrangham =

Wrangham may refer to:

== People with the surname ==
- Digby Cayley Wrangham (1805-1863), English barrister and politician
- Francis Wrangham (1769-1842), English author and translator
- Richard Wrangham (born 1948), British primatologist
