= Gervase Elwes (disambiguation) =

Gervase Elwes was an English tenor.

Gervase Elwes may also refer to:

- Sir Gervase Elwes, 1st Baronet (1628–1706), English Member of Parliament
- Gervase Elwes, junior (c. 1657–c. 1687), English Member of Parliament, son of the 1st baronet
