= Sir John Hippisley, 1st Baronet =

British diplomat and politician

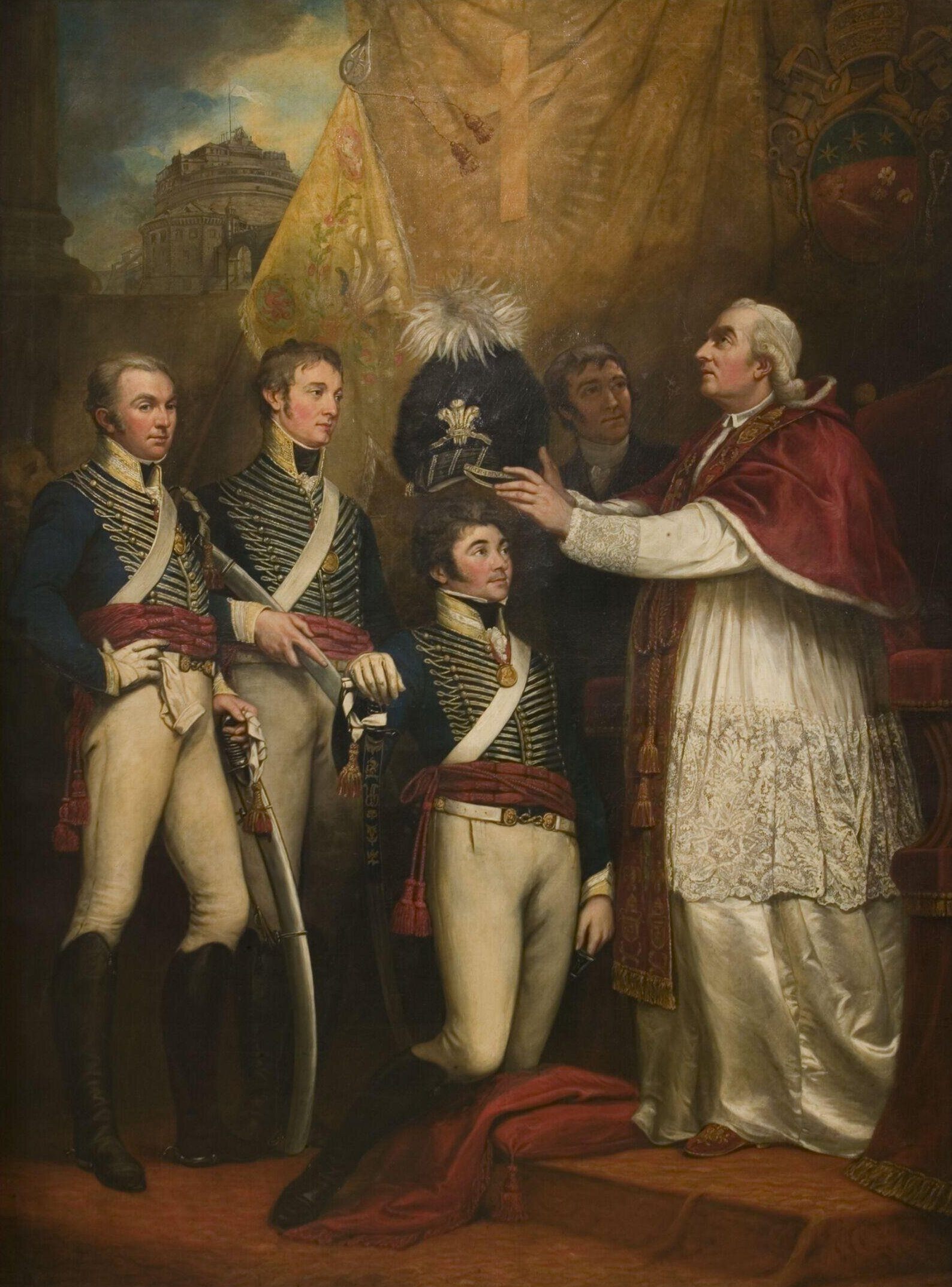
The Presentation of British Officers to Pope Pius VI, 1794, 1800 painting by James Northcote. Hippisley is second from right.

Sir John Coxe Hippisley, 1st Baronet (c. February 1746 – 3 May 1825) was a British diplomat and politician who pursued an 'unflagging, though wholly unsuccessful, quest for office' which led King George III of Great Britain to describe him as 'that busy man' and 'the grand intriguer'.

== Early life and overseas appointments ==
Born John Cox Hipsley in Bristol in 1746, he was the son of William Hipsley, a haberdasher, and Ann Webb. His middle name derived from his paternal grandmother, Dorothy Cox. He was educated at Bristol Grammar School and at Hertford College, Oxford, becoming a Doctor of Civil Law in 1776. He became a student at the Inner Temple in 1766 and was called to the bar in 1771. He was Treasurer of the Inner Temple from 19 November 1813 to 17 November 1814 and his monogram can be seen above the doorways of Nos. 10 and 11 King's Bench Walk.

In 1779 Hippisley travelled to Italy where he became the British government's man in Rome. He married his first wife Margaret Stuart in Rome in February 1780. Margaret was the second daughter of Sir John Stuart, third Baronet of Allanbank. They had four children together – Margaret Frances, born 1780; Windhamina Barbara (probably named after Hippisley's friend William Windham), born 1787; John Stuart, born 1790, and Louisa Anne.

In 1781 Hippisley secured an appointment with the East India Company and moved to Madras, eventually becoming paymaster in Tanjore. He resigned from the Company in 1787 and returned to England in 1789. In the following year he was returned as member of parliament (MP) for Sudbury. At the general elections of 1796 and 1801 he was not returned to Parliament, but he was successful in 1802 and retained his seat until 1818 when he retired from the House of Commons.

In 1792 Hippisley returned to Italy and remained there until 1795, during which time he served as a semi-official representative of the British Prime Minister William Pitt the Younger at the Court of Pope Pius VI. Upon returning to England he was called upon to negotiate the marriage between Prince Frederick of Württemberg (later Frederick I of Württemberg) to Charlotte, Princess Royal, eldest daughter of George III. After bringing the negotiations to a successful conclusion, Hippisley finally received his long-sought baronetcy on 10 May 1796

In 1799 the plight of Henry Benedict Stuart, the last representative in the male line of the Royal House of Stuart, was brought to Hippisley's attention by Dr. Stefano Borgia. Cardinal York was living in France, ill and penniless, and Hippisley persuaded George III to award him an annual pension of £4,000.

== Second marriage and later years ==
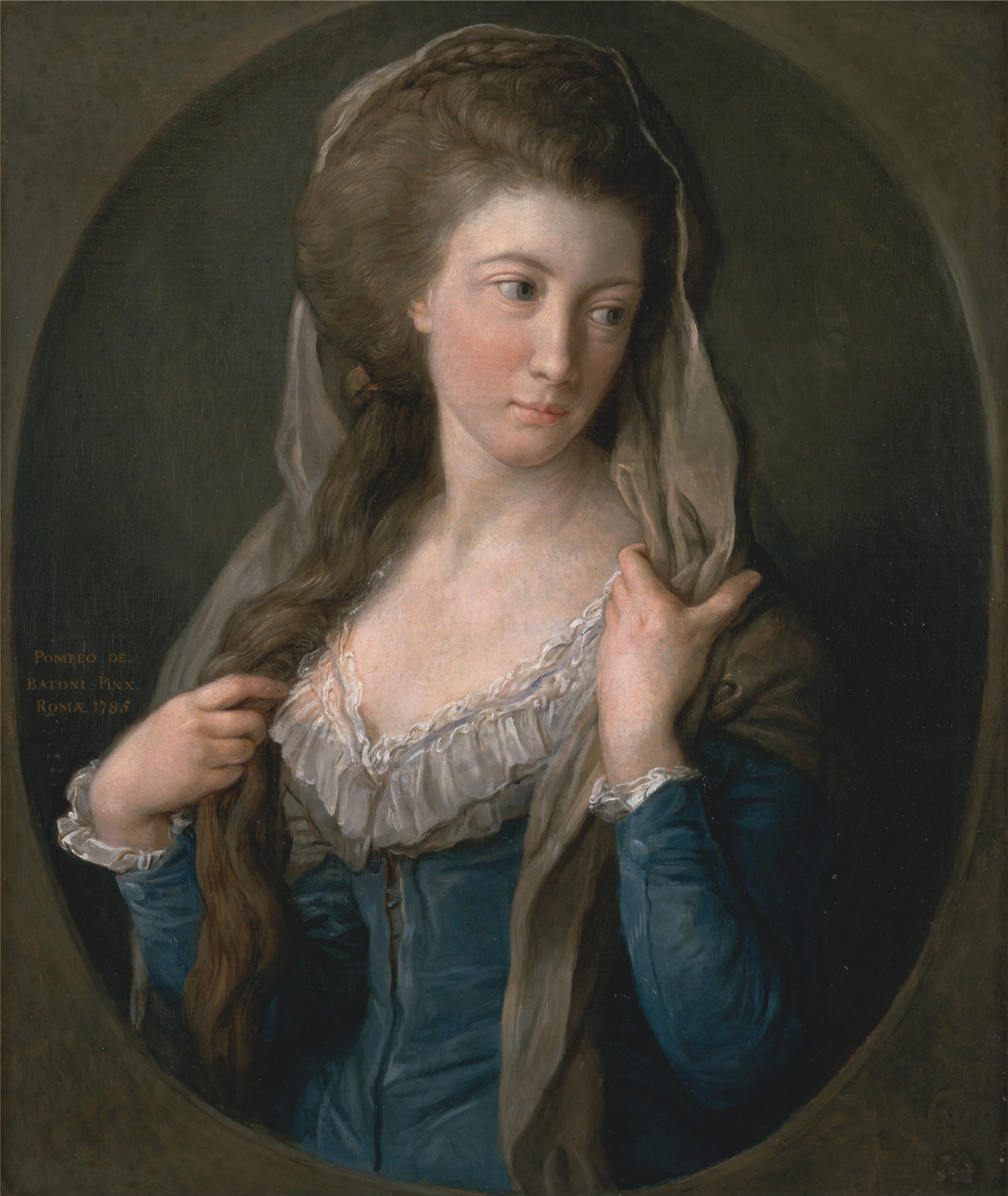
Portrait by Pompeo Battoni of a woman, traditionally identified as Margaret Stuart, Lady Hippisley (1785)

Hippisley's first wife Margaret died on 24 September 1799 in Brompton, London. In 1800 he served as High Sheriff of Berkshire, where he owned Warfield Grove, a red-brick Georgian mansion which he had bought from Admiral Sir George Bowyer. Hippisley sold the house to the Earl of Mountnorris in the early 19th century. In February 1801 he married his second wife, Elizabeth Anne Coxe (née Horner), the widow of Henry Hippisley Coxe (1748–1795) of Ston Easton Park, Somerset, MP for Somerset (1792–5). Despite the similarity of their names, John was not closely related to the Hippisleys of Ston Easton, if at all. He may have changed the spelling of his name around this time to further legitimise his position at Ston Easton.

Hippisley was a Fellow of the Royal Society, a vice-president and supporter of the Literary Fund Society, a benefactor of Downside Abbey, one of the principal promoters of the literary institutions of Bath and Bristol, a member of the government committee of the Turkey Company, vice-president of the West of England Agricultural Society and a member of the Society of Antiquaries. He was however not a popular man with all his contemporaries. The Rev. John Skinner referred to him as 'that great orator' and a 'great ass' in his diary, published as The Journal of a Somerset Rector, while in 1810 the wit and politician Joseph Jekyll described how during a speech by Hippisley in parliament 'the house coughed him down five times in vain, and the catarrh lasted two hours'.

Hippisley had no children with Elizabeth. He retired from political life in 1818 and died on 3 May 1825 in Grosvenor Street, London. He was buried in the Inner Temple vault on 12 May 1825. His monument was sculpted by William Grinsell Nicholl. His library was sold at auction in London by Stewart, Wheatley & Adlard on 1 March 1825 (and five following days), though the catalogue did not carry his name, referring to 'a portion of the library of a well known political character'. A copy of the sale catalogue is held at Cambridge University Library (shelfmark Munby.c.151(9)).

His widow Elizabeth died on 25 March 1843 in Grosvenor Square, London, whereupon the Ston Easton estate was inherited by her grandnephew, John Hippisley. Sir John was succeeded as baronet by John Stuart Hippisley, his son by his first wife, but he died unmarried in Mells, Somerset on 20 March 1867, whereupon the baronetcy became extinct.

Parliament of Great Britain
Preceded by William Smith; John Langston	Member of Parliament for Sudbury; 1790–1796; With: Thomas Champion Crespigny	Succeeded by William Smith; Sir James Marriott
Parliament of the United Kingdom
Preceded by William Smith; Sir James Marriott	Member of Parliament for Sudbury; 1802–1818; With: John Pytches 1802–1807; Emanuel Felix Agar 1807–1812; Charles Wyatt 1812–1818	Succeeded by William Heygate; John Broadhurst
Honorary titles
Preceded by James Sibbald	High Sheriff of Berkshire; 1800	Succeeded by Onesiphorus Elliott Elliott
Baronetage of Great Britain
New creation	Baronet (of Warfield); 1796–1825	Succeeded by John Stuart Hippisley
