= Sir Hervey Elwes, 2nd Baronet =

English politician

The arms of the Elwes family of Stoke are Or, a bend gules, surmounted by a fesse azure.

Sir Hervey Elwes, 2nd Baronet (c. 1683–1763), of Stoke-by-Clare, Suffolk, was a British landowner and Whig politician who sat in the English and British House of Commons between 1706 and 1722. He had the reputation of being an extreme miser.

== Early life ==
Elwes was baptized in July 1683, the eldest son of Gervase Elwes of Stoke College and his wife Isabella Hervey, daughter of Sir Thomas Hervey of Ickworth, Suffolk. His father died in about 1687. As a child, he suffered from consumption so that he had a poor constitution and a thin spare body. He was timid, and extremely diffident, had no friends and no interests apart from hoarding up his money and partridge setting. He was admitted at Queens' College, Cambridge on 22 June 1702. His grandfather Sir Gervase Elwes, 1st Baronet died on 11 April 1706 and he succeeded to the baronetcy and estate. The estate was so debt-ridden that his uncle, John Hervey, 1st Earl of Bristol, advised him either to sell his lands or marry a rich wife. In the event he never married nor sold the estates but lived a life of abject penury.

== Political career ==
Elwes was a loyal Whig, and succeeded to his grandfather's parliamentary seat. He was returned as Member of Parliament for Sudbury at a by-election on 16 December 1706. He became a Freeman, of Sudbury in 1706. His uncle tried unsuccessfully in 1707 to get him a grant of his grandfather's office under the duchy of Lancaster. He was re-elected at the 1708 general election and voted for Dr Sacheverell's impeachment in 1710. He was defeated at Sudbury in the 1710 election, but was returned unopposed in 1713. He voted in 1714 against the expulsion of Richard Steele. He was returned unopposed again as MP for Sudbury at the 1715 British general election but withdrew from politics in 1722.

== Later life and legacy ==
Elwes spent the next forty years of his life restoring his fortune by exercising severe economy. Much of the time he spent alone at Stoke, and was described as 'perhaps the most perfect picture of human penury that ever existed'. He died unmarried on 22 October 1763, aged about 80. He left at least a quarter of a million to his nephew, John Meggott, who took the name Elwes, and modelling his way of life on his uncle's, became as famous a miser. The baronetcy passed to a cousin.

Parliament of Great Britain
Preceded by Sir Gervase Elwes; Philip Skippon	Member of Parliament for Sudbury; 1706–1710; With: Philip Skippon	Succeeded by John Mead; Lieutenant-General Robert Echlin
Preceded by John Mead; Lieutenant-General Robert Echlin	Member of Parliament for Sudbury; 1713–1722; With: Lieutenant-General Robert Echlin; Thomas Western 1715-1722	Succeeded by John Knight; Colonel William Windham
Baronetage of England
Preceded by Gervase Elwes	Baronet (of Stoke-by-Clare); 1706-1763	Succeeded by William Elwes
