= Emanuel Felix Agar =

British soldier and member of parliament

Sir Emanuel Felix Agar (22 February 1781 – 28 August 1866) was a British soldier and member of parliament.

== Early life ==
Agar was born in London, the son of the art collector Welbore Ellis Agar (1735–1805) and Mary Ann Agar. His father, a brother of Charles Agar, 1st Earl of Normanton, Archbishop of Dublin, was the husband of Gertrude Hotham, and as no second marriage is known he is presumed to have been illegitimate. He had a brother, Welbore Felix Agar, and both were baptized at St Marylebone on 20 March 1798, when his brother’s date of birth was stated as 24 October 1779, a year before the death of his father’s wife, and his own as 22 February 1781. Their father was named. In his Will, dated 25 June 1804, Agar’s father leaves his substantial estate to his two sons and describes Agar as “Lieutenant Emanuel Felix Agar of the first Regiment of Life Guards and now living at Hyde Park Barracks”. His father’s art collection was sold in 1806 for some £35,000.

The name of Agar’s father is sometimes given as Thomas Agar.

== Career ==
Following his inheritance from his father, Agar stood unsuccessfully for parliament at Sudbury in 1806. He stood again there in the following year, this time successfully. He entered the House of Commons and represented Sudbury until the general election of 1812, when he lost his seat. Throughout his time in parliament, Agar was a Pittite.

Agar continued to serve in the British Army and took part in the Peninsular War of 1808 to 1812. He retired as a major in the Life Guards and was knighted as a Knight Bachelor on 17 June 1812. He later worked in the department of the Treasurer of the Navy.

In 1836, Agar’s brother Welbore Felix Agar of Brent Ely Hall, Suffolk, died and left him his whole property.

In 1866 Agar died, aged 85, at Stratford Place, his wife Margaret having predeceased him in 1863.

Parliament of the United Kingdom
Preceded by Sir John Coxe Hippisley; John Pytches	Member of Parliament for Sudbury; 1807 – 1812; With: Sir John Coxe Hippisley	Succeeded by Sir John Coxe Hippisley; Charles Wyatt
