= History of parliamentary constituencies and boundaries in Suffolk =

The ceremonial county of Suffolk has returned seven MPs to the UK Parliament from 1997 to 2024. Under the 2023 review of Westminster constituencies, coming into effect for the 2024 general election, the boundary commission proposed eight constituencies, including one which is shared with the county of Norfolk.

== Number of seats ==
The table below shows the number of MPs representing Suffolk at each major redistribution of seats affecting the county.

Year	County seats (Note: Prior to 1950, seats were classified as county divisions or parliamentary boroughs. Since 1950, they have been classified as county or borough constituencies.)	Borough seats	Total
Prior to 1832	2	14	16
1832–1844 (Note: The Borough of Sudbury disenfranchised for corruption.)	4	7	11
1844–1885	4	5	9
1885–1918	5	3	8
1918–1950	5	1	6
1950–1983	4	1	5
1983–1997	5	1	6
1997–2024	6	1	7
2024–present	7	1	8 (Note: Includes one cross-county border constituency shared with Norfolk.)

== Timeline ==
County seat Borough seat

Constituency	Prior to 1832	1832–1844	1844–1885	1885–1918	1918–1950	1950–1983	1983–1997	1997–2024	2024–present
Suffolk	1290–1832 (2 MPs)								
Dunwich	1298–1832 (2 MPs)								
Aldeburgh	1571–1832 (2 MPs)								
Orford	1529–1832 (2 MPs)								
Eastern Suffolk		1832–1885 (2 MPs)							
Lowestoft				1885–1983					2024–present
Waveney							1983–2024		
Eye	1571–1832 (2 MPs)	1832–1885		1885–1983					
Waveney Valley (part)									2024–present
Suffolk Coastal							1983–present		
Central Suffolk							1983–1997		
Central Suffolk and North Ipswich								1997–present	
Ipswich	1295–1918 (2 MPs)				1918–present				
Woodbridge				1885–1950					
Sudbury and Woodbridge						1950–1983			
Western Suffolk		1832–1885 (2 MPs)							
Sudbury	1559–1844 (2 MPs)			1885–1950					
South Suffolk							1983–present		
Stowmarket				1885–1918					
Bury St Edmunds and Stowmarket									2024–present
Bury St Edmunds	1614–1885 (2 MPs)			1885–1918	1918–2024				
West Suffolk								1997–present	

== Boundary reviews ==
Prior to 1832	Since 1290, the parliamentary county of Suffolk, along with all other English counties regardless of size or population, had elected two MPs (knights of the shire) to the House of Commons. The county also included seven parliamentary boroughs, namely Aldeburgh, Bury St Edmunds, Dunwich, Eye, Ipswich, Orford and Sudbury, all returning two MPs (burgesses) each.	
1832	The Reform Act 1832 radically changed the representation of the House of Commons, with the county being divided into the Eastern and Western Divisions, both returning two MPs. The boroughs of Aldeburgh, Dunwich and Orford were abolished and Eye's representation was reduced to one MP.	
1844	The Borough of Sudbury was disenfranchised for corruption and absorbed into the Western Division.	
1885	Under the Redistribution of Seats Act 1885, the two 2-member county divisions were replaced by five single-member constituencies, namely the Northern or Lowestoft Division, the North-Eastern or Eye Division (which absorbed the abolished parliamentary borough of Eye), the North-Western or Stowmarket Division, the South-Eastern or Woodbridge Division and the South or Sudbury Division. The representation of the Borough of Bury St Edmunds was reduced to one MP and Ipswich continued to elect two MPs. Part of the parliamentary borough of Great Yarmouth was also in the county (see Norfolk).	Suffolk 1885–1918
1918	Under the Representation of the People Act 1918, the parliamentary borough of Bury St Edmunds was abolished and reconstituted as a county seat, absorbing the abolished Stowmarket Division, with the exception of a small area in the south-east, including Stowmarket itself, which was transferred to Eye. The southernmost part of Lowestoft, including Halesworth, was also transferred to Eye. The representation of the Borough of Ipswich was reduced to one MP, with boundaries expanding into Woodbridge to align with those of the County Borough of Ipswich.	Suffolk 1918–1950
1950	The Representation of the People Act 1948 resulted in the abolition of the Sudbury and Woodbridge Divisions. They were replaced by the new constituency of Sudbury and Woodbridge, incorporating the towns of Sudbury and Hadleigh from Sudbury, and Woodbridge and Felixstowe from Woodbridge. Western and northern parts of Sudbury, including Haverhill, were transferred to Bury St Edmunds and northern parts of Woodbridge were transferred to Eye. Halesworth was returned from Eye to Lowestoft. There were no changes under the First or Second Periodic Reviews of Westminster Constituencies.	Suffolk 1950–1983
1983	The Third Review, which reflected the changes to local authorities arising from the Local Government Act 1972, did not come into effect until the 1983 general election, when Suffolk's representation was increased back up to six MPs. This resulted in major changes to the configuration of the county's seats as follows: Eye was abolished, with eastern parts being included in the new constituency of Suffolk Coastal and western parts in the new constituency of Central Suffolk; Sudbury and Woodbridge was also abolished, with areas to the east of Ipswich and the River Orwell (Felixstowe and Woodbridge) being included in Suffolk Coastal, and western areas (Sudbury and Hadleigh) forming the basis of the new constituency of South Suffolk; Central Suffolk included four north-western wards of the Borough of Ipswich, transferred from the constituency of Ipswich.; Bury St Edmunds lost southern areas, including Haverhill, to South Suffolk, and easternmost areas to Central Suffolk; With the exception of a small area in the far north of the constituency, including Bradwell, which had been transferred from Suffolk to Norfolk under the local government reorganisation and was now included in the constituency of Great Yarmouth, Lowestoft was succeeded by the new constituency of Waveney.	Suffolk 1983–1997
1997	The Fourth Review resulted in further major changes with the addition of a seventh constituency, named West Suffolk. This was formed from the majority of the existing Bury St Edmunds constituency, including Newmarket and Mildenhall. It also included Haverhill and surrounding areas, transferred from South Suffolk. Bury St Edmunds was reconfigured, taking western parts of Central Suffolk, including Stowmarket. Central Suffolk (renamed Central Suffolk and North Ipswich), in turn, gained westernmost parts of Suffolk Coastal, which then gained southernmost parts of Waveney, including Halesworth and Southwold.	Suffolk 1997–2010
2010	In the Fifth Review the Boundary Commission for England recommended that Suffolk retain its current constituencies, with changes only to reflect revisions to local authority ward boundaries. The largest of these changes resulted in the effective transfer of one Borough of Ipswich ward from Central Suffolk and North Ipswich to the constituency of Ipswich.	Suffolk 1997–2024
2024	For the 2023 Periodic Review of Westminster constituencies, which redrew the constituency map ahead of the 2024 United Kingdom general election, the Boundary Commission for England opted to combine Suffolk with Norfolk as a sub-region of the East of England region, with the creation of the cross-county boundary constituency of Waveney Valley, which incorporated the following areas of Suffolk: Bungay, transferred from Waveney (reverted to Lowestoft); Halesworth, transferred from Suffolk Coastal; Rural areas of north Suffolk, including Eye, transferred from Central Suffolk and North Ipswich, and Bury St Edmunds (renamed Bury St Edmunds and Stowmarket).; Other relatively small changes to align to ward boundaries and bring electorate numbers within the permitted electoral range. Ipswich was unchanged.	Suffolk 2024–present

== See also ==
- List of parliamentary constituencies in Suffolk
