= John Elwes =

John Elwes may refer to:

- John Elwes (tenor) (born 1946), English tenor singer
- John Elwes (politician) (1714–1789), English Member of Parliament and miser
- John Payne Elwes, British Member of Parliament for North Essex

== See also ==
- Elwes
