= Elwes =

Elwes (/ˈɛlwɪs/) is an English surname whose spelling over the years has included Helwys, Helwish, Helewise, Helwis, Elves, Elvis, Elwaiss, Elwaies and Elway. The modern-day surname Elvidge is thought to track back to Ellweses in Wadworth, South Yorkshire. A notable family with the Elwes name were landed gentry, of Roxby in Lincolnshire; several of the individuals listed below were from this Elwes family, members of which invariably used the final middle name "Cary" (sometimes hyphenated to form a double-barrelled surname) following the 1717 marriage of Robert Elwes (1690–1752) and Martha, daughter of Richard Cary, of Bedford Row, London, a merchant and a governor of the Bank of England.

People with the Elwes surname:

- Columba Cary-Elwes (1903–1994), English Benedictine monk
- Elwes baronets, 1660–1787
- Eva Elwes (1876–1950), English actor and playwright
- Catherine Elwes (born 1952), British feminist video artist
- Sir Gervase Elwes, 1st Baronet (1628–1706)
  - Gervase Elwes, junior (c. 1657–1687) politician
- Gervase Elwes (1866–1921), English singer; father of Simon
  - Simon Elwes (1902–1975), English artist; father of Dominick and Peter
    - Peter Elwes (1929–2017)
      - Luke Elwes (born 1961), English artist
        - Jake Elwes (born 1993), English media artist
    - Dominick Elwes (1931–1975), English artist; 3 sons listed below
      - Cassian Elwes (born 1959), English independent film producer
      - Damian Elwes (born 1960), English artist
      - Cary Elwes (born 1962), English actor
- Henry John Elwes (1846–1922) English botanist and plant-collector
- John Elwes (politician) (1714–1789), grandson of Sir Gervase (born Meggot)
- John Elwes (tenor) (born 1946), English singer
- Polly Elwes (1928–1987), English television reporter and presenter
- Sir Richard Elwes (1901–1968), English barrister and judge
- Robert Elwes (British Army officer) (1856–1881), English soldier
- Robert Elwes (painter) (1818–1878), English traveller and painter
