= Samuel Kekewich =

Samuel Kekewich may refer to:

- Samuel Trehawke Kekewich (1796–1873), member of parliament for Exeter and later for South Devon
- Samuel Kekewich (Sudbury MP) (1657–1700), member of parliament for Sudbury in 1698-70
