= Thomas Jermyn =

Thomas Jermyn may refer to:

- Sir Thomas Jermyn (died 1552), English knight
- Thomas Jermyn (1561–1607), English MP
- Sir Thomas Jermyn (1573–1645), English MP, Governor of Jersey
- Thomas Jermyn (1604–1659), his son, English MP
- Thomas Jermyn, 2nd Baron Jermyn (1633–1703), his son, English MP and peer
