= Elwes baronets =

Extinct baronetcy in the Baronetage of England

- Escutcheon of the Elwes baronets of Stoke-by-Clare
- Creation date: 1660
- Status: extinct
- Extinction date: 1778
- Arms: Or, a bend gules, surmounted by a fesse azure

The Elwes Baronetcy (/ˈɛlwɪs/) of Stoke-by-Clare in the County of Suffolk, was a title in the Baronetage of England held by the Elwys family, whose name through the years has alternately been spelled Helwish, Helewise, Helwys, Elwaiss and Elwaies.

The baronetcy was created on 22 June 1660 by King Charles II for Gervase Elwes, Member of Parliament for Sudbury and Suffolk. The second Baronet was Member of Parliament for Suffolk. John Elwes was the nephew of the second Baronet.

The title possibly became either extinct or dormant following the death of the third Baronet on 26 November 1778, under unclear circumstances. The third Baronet left three sons—Henry, William, and Thomas—the eldest of whom, Henry, was assumed to have become the fourth baronet; however there is no record that he did so, putting into question whether or not the sons were legitimate. In 1779, William and Thomas were recorded proving their father's will, indicating he may have died shortly after his father. However, after the death of the third Baronet's widow, Johanna Elwes (née Bobulia), none of the sons appeared to prove her will, lending credence that she was not their mother. According to The Complete Baronetage (1904), the third Baronet dspm legit (decessit sine prole mascula legitima – "died without legitimate male issue").

According to Burke's, the baronetcy became extinct upon the death of the third Baronet in 1778. Some sources, however, record a fourth Baronet, Sir Henry Elwes, who was believed to be the younger brother of the third Baronet. He died without heirs in 1787, at which point the baronetcy likely became extinct. According to the Standing Council of the Baronetage, the Elwes baronetcy is not among the vacant or dormant baronetcies.

== Elwes baronets, of Stoke-by-Clare (1660) ==
- Sir Gervase Elwes, 1st Baronet (1628–1706)
  - Gervase Elwes, junior, (c. 1657–c. 1687), d.s.p.
- Sir Hervey Elwes, 2nd Baronet (1683–1763)
- Sir William Elwes, 3rd Baronet (died 1778), d.s.p.m.l.
- Sir Henry Elwes, 4th Baronet (died 1787) (unconfirmed)
