= Cordell baronets =

Extinct baronetcy in the Baronetage of England

Escutcheon of the Cordell baronets

The Cordell Baronetcy, of Long Melford in the County of Suffolk, was a title in the Baronetage of England. It was created on 22 June 1660 for Robert Cordell, a collateral descendant of William Cordell. He was subsequently Member of Parliament for Sudbury.

The 3rd Baronet represented Sudbury and Suffolk in Parliament while the 3rd Baronet briefly represented Sudbury. The title became extinct on the latter's death in 1704.

== Cordell baronets, of Long Melford (1660) ==
- Sir Robert Cordell, 1st Baronet (c. 1616–c. 1680)
- Sir John Cordell, 2nd Baronet (1646–1690)
- Sir John Cordell, 3rd Baronet (1677–1704)
