= John Cole (antiquary) =

English bookseller (1792–1848)

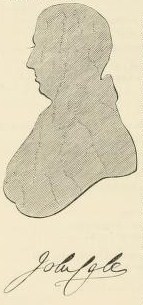
John Cole

John Cole (1792–1848) was an English bookseller, publisher and antiquary, of Northampton, Lincoln and Scarborough, North Yorkshire. He was born on 3 Oct. 1792 at Weston Favell in Northamptonshire. He is remarkable as having compiled over 100 publications but whether as bookseller, lecturer, 'general factor,' or school-master, Cole was invariably unsuccessful. As self-trained and industrious antiquary, he appears to have been utterly unsuited for the cares of a business life and he was constantly on the move and died in poverty. Cole generally printed only few copies of his books which make them rare. As his books contain much out-of-the-way information, they are sought after by collectors. He was in the habit of binding up extra plates and additional manuscript matter in his private copies. A silhouette portrait of Cole and facsimile of his handwriting are given in the Yorkshire Library

== Early career ==
He was apprenticed to Mr. W. Birdsall, a bookseller and noted bookbinder of Northampton. He began his literary career with a History of Northampton and its Vicinity in 1815. In 1817 he married Susanna daughter of James Marshall of Northampton. In the same in 1817 he paid £1,000 for the stock and goodwill of Mr Johnston, a bookseller at Lincoln. His shop was in the High Street, close to the Stonebow. He described himself as Bookseller Stationer and Binder, top of the High Street, deals in OLD BOOKS, and fancy articles, Handscreens and handles, Medallions, Morocco and Copper Plate, Paper, Etc. He printed his first Catalogue of Old Books at Lincoln in that year. However, this book was largely based on information included in Adam Stark's ‘The History of Lincoln of 1810, together with information taken from Edward James Willson's The History of Lincoln; containing an account of the Antiquities, Edifices, Trade, which had been published in 1816.

== Hull and Scarborough ==
Following this he moved to Hull and afterwards to Scarborough. In 1821 publishing An Ænigmatical Catalogue of Books of Merit, on an entirely new plan. In the next ten years he issued most of his antiquarian and biographical works, many of which relate to Scarborough. He added to his small income by giving lectures on natural philosophy and related subjects. A Mr. Bean records I have known Mr. John Cole and have attended many of his lectures on astronomy, the anatomy of costume, architecture, and natural history. These several subjects [were] discussed in a scientific, pleasing, and popular manner. Failing to make a success at Scarborough, Cole returned to Northampton and opened a shop in the market square some time after 1830.

== Attempted Career as a Schoolmaster ==
He was forced into bankruptcy by his creditors at Northampton, and went to live at Wellingborough about 1835. There Cole opened a small school, and placed geological specimens, &c. [as well as such incongruous wares as apples, bacon, and ham] in his window for sale. He was a quiet man and regarded as very eccentric because he and his sons would go out all day, and return laden with wild plants, &c. . . . His industrious curiosity was never appreciated in Northamptonshire, where he dragged out a miserable existence. From Wellingborough he removed to Ringstead, or some village in its vicinity, where he ransacked every nook for relics of antiquity and natural curiosities He moved to Rushden as a schoolmaster in 1837, and successively lived at Polebrook, Huntingdon, and Woodford (near Thrapston), where he died in greatly reduced circumstances on 12 April 1848, aged 56.

== Works ==
Cole's works include:

- History of Northampton and its Vicinity, Northampton, 1815; 2nd edition, 1821; 3rd edition, 1831.
- History of Lincoln, Lincoln, 1818.
- Histrionic Topography, London, 1818, 13 plates. Published by Cole, engravings by James Storer and Henry Sargant Storer, descriptions by James Norris Brewer.
- A Catalogue of Standard Books, made out on an entirely new plan, (titles are drawn up in enigmas). Second edition as An Ænigmatical Catalogue of Books of Merit, on an entirely new plan, Scarborough, 1821.
- A Key to Cole's Ænigmatical Catalogue of Books, Scarborough, 1821.
- Questions on Cooke's Topography of the County of York, 1821, 1834. Based on the work of George Alexander Cooke.
- Herveiana; or graphic and literary Sketches illustrative of the Life and Writings of the Rev. James Hervey, Scarborough, 1822-3-6, 3 pts. (pt. ii. includes some unpublished letters of James Hervey).
- Graphic and Historical Sketches of Scarborough, Scarborough, 1822, (with wood engravings by A. J. Mason). Second edition as Picture of Scarborough for the year 1823, Scarborough, 1823, (reprinted in 1824, 1825, 1829, and 1832 as the Scarborough Guide, ed. by Christopher Robert Todd, 1836 and 1841).
- A Biographical Sketch of the late Robert North, Esq., the founder of the Amicable Society, Scarborough, Scarborough, 1823.
- Bibliographical and Descriptive Tour from Scarborough to the Library of a Philobiblist, Scarborough, 1824. Reference is to Francis Wrangham.
- Sketch of the History of Scarborough, Scarborough, 1824.
- The Scarborough Repository and Mirror of the Season, consisting of historical, biographical, and topographical subjects, &c., Scarborough, 1824, vol. i. (8 Nos.), all published.
- Scarborough, Yorkshire [Letters] to the Editor of the Port-Folio, Scarborough [1824].
- A Descriptive Catalogue of a select portion of the Stock of John Cole, Scarborough, 1825.
- The Scarborough Album of History and Poetry, Scarborough, 1825.
- The History and Antiquities of Ecton, county of Northampton, Scarborough, 1825.
- A Series of Cabinet Views of Scarborough, Scarborough, 1825.
- Extracts of Sermon on death of Thomas Hinderwell, Scarborough, 1825.
- Scarborough Worthies, Scarborough, 1826, (mostly a life of Thomas Hinderwell).
- Memoirs of the Life, Writings, and Character of the late Thomas Hinderwell, Esq., Scarborough, 1826.
- Le petit Visiteur; containing a Sketch of the History of Scarborough, Scarborough, 1826.
- A Tour round Scarborough, historically and bibliographically unfolded, Scarborough, 1826.
- Bookselling Spiritualised: Books and Articles of Stationery rendered Monitors of Religion, Scarborough, 1826.
- The Antiquarian Trio, Scarborough, 1826. Subtitle Consisting of Views and Description of I. Duke of Buckingham's House; II. Rudston Church and Obelisk; III. Effigy in the Town Hall, with Some Original Observations on the Latter by the Rev. J. L. Sisson, M.A.; to which is Added … a Brief Description of Hunmanby.
- The Fugitive Pieces of Thomas Hinderwell, Scarborough, 1826.
- The Casket of Poetry, Scarborough, 1827.
- Tribute to the Memory of Mr. Wm. Abbott, Scarborough, 1827.
- An [sic] Unique Bibliomaniac Displayed in a Biographical Account of Mr. Wm. Abbott, Scarborough, 1827, (with Catalogue of Books).
- Dialogues in the Shades respecting the Cliff Bridge, Scarborough, Scarborough., 1827.
- The History and Antiquities of Weston Favell in the county of Northampton, Scarborough, 1827.
- The Scarborough Souvenir, Scarborough, 1827.
- The Scarborough Collector and Journal of the Olden Time, Scarborough, 1828 (plates).
- A pleasant and profitable Journey to London, Scarborough, 1828.
- The History and Antiquities of Filey in the county of York, Scarborough, 1828.
- The Oldfieldian Cookery Book, Scarborough, 1828, (from the recipes of J. Oldfield).
- Journal of the Entrance upon their Journey of Life of the Young Travellers, John [born 3 October 1792] and Susanna [born 3 August 1796] Cole, Scarborough.
- Select Remains of the Rev. John Mason, M. A., Scarborough, 1828.
- Letter to John Tindal relating to the remains of an ancient village near Cloughton, Scarborough, 1828.
- Historical Sketches of Scalby, Burniston, and Cloughton, with Descriptive Notices of Hayburn Wyke and Stainton Dale in the county of York, Scarborough, 1829.
- The Antiquarian Bijou, Scarborough, 1829.
- The Antiquarian Casket, Scarborough, 1829.
- Bibliotheca Coleiana: a Catalogue of the Collection of Books the private property of John Cole, Scarborough, printed for Cole for friends, 1829.
- Original Letters of the Rev. James Hervey, Scarborough, 1829.
- The Curiosities of Scarborough described in Verse, Scarborough, 1829.
- A Month's Excursion, Scarborough, 1829.
- Scarborough Graphic Gems, Scarborough, 1829.
- Biographical Account of Master Herbert, Scarborough, 1830.
- A Critique on the performance of Master Herbert, the youthful Roscius, Scarborough, 1830.
- Scarborough Tales, Scarborough, 1830.
- Critique on the performance of Juliana by Miss Hilton, Scarborough, 1831.
- Biographical Account of the late Rev. S. Bottomley, Scarborough, 1831.
- Critique on the performance of Othello by F. W. Keene Aldridge, the African Roscius, Scarborough, 1831.
- An Account of the Proceedings at the Commemoration in Honour of Hervey at Weston Favell, 18 June 1833, Northampton, for private distribution, 1833.
- Reminiscences tributary to the Memory of Thomas Allen, Northampton, private distribution, 1833. For Thomas Allen.
- Cole's Graphic Cabinet, Northampton, 1833.
- Fifty original Hymns by James Edmeston, Northampton, 1833. James Edmeston was a well-known London architect and hymn-writer.
- Ten Minutes' Advice on Shaving, London, 1834.
- Historical Notices of Wellingborough, Wellingborough, 1834.
- History and Antiquities of Wellingborough, Wellingborough, 1837, and Northampton, 1865.
- Conundrums conceived and arranged by John Cole during his residence at Wellingborough, Wellingborough, 1837.
- History and Antiquities of Higham Ferrers, Wellingborough, 1838.
- Annals of Rushden, Irthlingborough, and Knuston, Wellingborough, 1838.
- Memoirs of Mrs. Chapone, London, 1839.
- Popular Biography of Northamptonshire, Wellingborough, 1839.
- Buds of Poesy [by W. L. Cole], London, 1839.
- The Calendar of everyday Reference for the County of Huntingdon, Huntingdon, 1845, 2 (or more) parts.
- The Real Romance of the Tombs at Great Addington, Wellingborough, 1847.
- Northampton pictorially Illustrated, Northampton, 1847.

Undated works:

- The Talents of Edmund Kean delineated.
- Scarborough Natural Historians.
- Catalogue of Books on Sale by John Cole, Market Square, Northampton.

== Notes ==
Attribution

This article incorporates text from a publication now in the public domain: Stephen, Leslie, ed. (1887). "Cole, John". Dictionary of National Biography. Vol. 11. London: Smith, Elder & Co.
