= Smith baronets of Stratford Place (1897) =

Escutcheon of the Smith baronets of Stratford Place

The Smith baronetcy of Stratford Place in London was created on 6 September 1897 in the Baronetage of the United Kingdom for the surgeon Thomas Smith, on the occasion of the Diamond Jubilee of Queen Victoria, to whom he was surgeon extraordinary.

== Smith baronets of Stratford Place, London (1897) ==
- Sir Thomas Smith, 1st Baronet (1833–1909)
- Sir Thomas Rudolph Hampden Smith, 2nd Baronet (1869–1958)
- Sir Thomas Turner Smith, 3rd Baronet (1903–1961)
- Sir Thomas Gilbert Smith, 4th Baronet (1937–2003)
- Sir Andrew Thomas Smith, 5th Baronet (born 1965)

The heir apparent is the present holder's son Samuel James Thomas Smith, born 2009.

== Notes ==
Baronetage of the United Kingdom
Preceded by Ripley baronets	Smith baronets of Stratford Place; 6 September 1897	Succeeded by Quilter baronets
