= Sir John Cordell, 2nd Baronet =

English politician

Sir John Cordell, 2nd Baronet (1646–1690) of Long Melford, Sudbury, Suffolk, was an English Tory politician who sat in the House of Commons between 1685 and 1690.

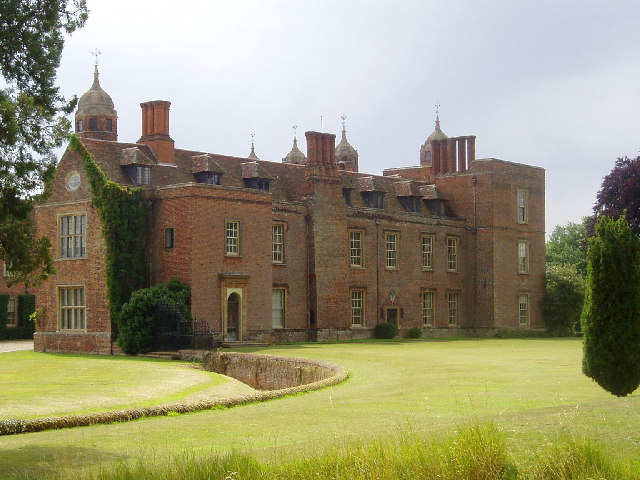
Melford Hall

Cordell was the eldest son of Sir Robert Cordell, 1st Baronet. He was educated at Bury St. Edmunds Grammar School in 1656 and travelled abroad from 1663 to 1666. By 1674, he married Elizabeth Waldegrave, daughter of Thomas Waldegrave of Smallbridge, Suffolk.

In 1685 he served a one-year term as High Sheriff of Suffolk. Cordell was returned as a Member of Parliament for Sudbury in 1685 and for Suffolk in 1689.

Cordell was buried on 9 September 1690 at Long Melford leaving a son and two daughters. The baronetcy passed to his eldest son John, who was returned for Sudbury in 1701 but who died by a fall from his horse in 1704. The estates then passed to his two sisters, of whom Margaret married Sir Charles Firebrace, 2nd Baronet.

Parliament of England
Preceded by Gervase Elwes; Sir Gervase Elwes, Bt	Member of Parliament for Sudbury; 1685–1687; With: Sir George Wenyeve	Succeeded by John Poley; Philip Gurdon
Preceded by Sir Robert Broke, Bt; Sir Henry North, Bt	Member of Parliament for Suffolk; 1689–1690; With: Sir John Rous, Bt	Succeeded by Sir Gervase Elwes, Bt; Sir Samuel Barnardiston, Bt
Baronetage of England
Preceded by Robert Cordell	Baronet (of Long Melford); 1680–1690	Succeeded by John Cordell
