= Frederick Loverseed =

British Liberal politician (1881–1928)

Member of Parliament for Sudbury
- In office 6 December 1923 – 9 October 1924
- Preceded by: Herbert Mercer
- Succeeded by: Henry Burton

Personal details
- Born: 22 December 1881
- Died: 14 August 1928 (aged 46)
- Party: Liberal

John Frederick Loverseed (22 December 1881 – 14 August 1928) was a British Liberal politician.

== Family and Education ==
Loverseed was the son of a Nottinghamshire builder and contractor. He was educated at Southwell Grammar School and Gosberton Hall. In 1910 he married Katherine Thurman of Grantham, Lincolnshire. They had one son. In religion he was a Methodist and in 1924 he was a Member of the Wesleyan Methodist Conference.

== Career ==
From 1899 to 1905 Loverseed was engaged in farming. In 1914 he entered the services becoming a captain and adjutant in the 5th Battalion, Suffolk Officer Training Corps and in 1916 was military representative for tribunals in West Suffolk.

== Politics ==
From 1908 to 1913 he was Agent to Sir Richard Winfrey, Coalition Liberal MP for South West Norfolk from 1906 to 1923 and later for Gainsborough 1923–24. In 1922 he was Agent to Major S G Howard, the Coalition Liberal MP for Sudbury from 1918 to 1922. Loverseed was also active in local politics in Suffolk, being a County Councillor and a Town Councillor in Sudbury from 1919 and serving as Mayor of Sudbury for two terms from 1921 to 1923. At the 1923 general election Loverseed was elected Liberal MP for Sudbury, beating the sitting Unionist Colonel Herbert Mercer. Mercer had beaten Loverseed's old chief Stephen Howard at the 1922 general election with a majority of 1,888 votes but Loverseed turned this into a Liberal majority of 665. However Loverseed only held the seat for a year, losing to Conservative Henry Walter Burton at the 1924 general election.

== Other public service ==
Loverseed took a great interest in local education in his region. He was Chairman of Governors of Sudbury Grammar School, a Governor of East Anglian School, Bury St Edmunds and of King Edward VI's School, Bury St Edmunds as well as being a Governor of the Girls' Secondary School, Sudbury. He served on West Suffolk Education Committee and Standing Joint Committee. He was created a justice of the peace in Suffolk in 1924.

== Son also an MP ==
His son John Eric Loverseed was an RAF Warrant Officer in the Second World War and was elected Common Wealth MP for Eddisbury in Cheshire, from 1943 to 1945. He joined the Labour Party in 1944 and fought Eddisbury again at the 1945 general election this time losing to a National Liberal. In May 1955 he stood against Herbert Morrison unsuccessfully for South Lewisham as an Independent Pacifist.

Parliament of the United Kingdom
Preceded by Herbert Mercer	Member of Parliament for Sudbury; 1923 – 1924	Succeeded by Henry Burton
