= Sir Robert Cordell, 1st Baronet =

English politician

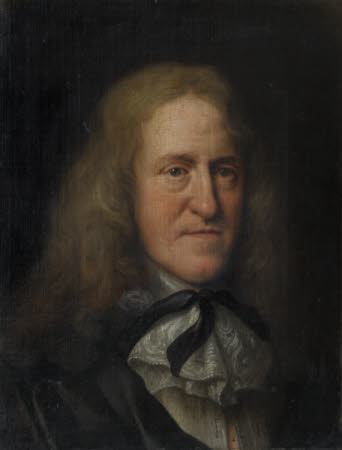
- Sir Robert Cordell, Bt
- Born: Unknown
- Died: 1680
- Buried: St Lawrence Jewry, London
- Father: Sir John Cordell
- Mother: Sarah Bankworth
- Occupation: Politician

Sir Robert Cordell, 1st Baronet (died c.1680), of Long Melford, Suffolk, was an English lawyer, landowner and politician who sat in the House of Commons at various times between 1660 and 1679.

== Early life ==
Cordell was the son of Sir John Cordell, of St Lawrence Old Jewry, London and his wife Sarah, daughter of Robert Bankworth or Barbow of London. He was educated at Exeter College, Oxford, matriculating on 21 June 1633. In 1635, he traveled abroad before entering Gray's Inn to train in law in 1636.

Before 1643, he repurchased the estate of Long Melford from the Savage family, which had formerly belonged to Sir William Cordell; Melford Hall became his main residence.

== Career ==
Cordell was Sheriff of Suffolk from 1653 to 1654. In 1660 he was appointed a justice of the peace and commissioner for assessment in Suffolk.

In April 1660, Cordell was elected Member of Parliament for Sudbury but the election was declared void in May. He was created a baronet on 22 June 1660. He was elected MP for Sudbury in a by-election to the Cavalier Parliament in 1662, in which he was appointed to fifteen committees. He likely supported religious toleration and was excluded from the commission of the peace after the passing of the Conventicles Act 1670.

In 1679 he was re-elected MP for Sudbury in the First Exclusion Parliament. He was listed as a friend of Anthony Ashley-Cooper and voted in favour of exclusion during the Exclusion Crisis. He did not stand for re-election at the October 1679 English general election owing to ill-health.

== Marriage and issue ==
Cordell married in or before 1643 Margaret Wright, daughter of Sir Edmund Wright, of Swakeleys House, Ickenham, Middlesex Lord Mayor of London and his first wife, Martha Baron, daughter of Edward Baron, of London. Cordell was buried on 3 January 1680, at St Lawrence Jewry, London. His wife was buried on 24 March 1681 with her father and husband at St Lawrence Jewry. Their son John succeeded to the baronetcy. Their daughter, Sarah, married the politician Sir William Spring.

Parliament of England
Preceded by Thomas Waldegrave; Isaac Appleton	Member of Parliament for Sudbury; 1662–1679; With: Thomas Waldegrave 1662–1667; Sir Gervase Elwes, Bt 1677–1679; Gervase Elwes 1679	Succeeded by Sir Gervase Elwes, Bt; Gervase Elwes
Baronetage of England
New creation	Baronet (of Long Melford); 1660–1680	Succeeded by John Cordell
