= Wood baronets of The Hermitage (1897) =

The Wood baronetcy, of The Hermitage in Chester-le-Street in the County of Durham, was created in the Baronetage of the United Kingdom on 23 September 1897 for Lindsay Wood, former President of the Institute of Mining Engineers. He was a younger son of Nicholas Wood (1795–1865) the locomotive engineer, and younger brother of Nicholas Wood (1832–1892) the mine owner and politician.

The title became extinct on the death of the 3rd Baronet in 1946.

== Wood baronets, of The Hermitage (1897) ==
- Sir Lindsay Wood, 1st Baronet (1834–1920)
- Sir Arthur Nicholas Lindsay Wood, 2nd Baronet (1875–1939)
- Sir Ian Lindsay Wood, 3rd Baronet (1909–1946)

== Notes ==
Baronetage of the United Kingdom
Preceded by Quilter baronets	Wood baronets of The Hermitage; 23 September 1897	Succeeded by MacCormac baronets
