= George Wenyeve =

English Tory politician (c.1627–1706)

Sir George Wenyeve (c.1627 – 26 May 1706) was an English Tory politician.

Wenyeve was the eldest son of Edward Wenyeve and Anne Plumsted. He was educated at King Edward VI School, Bury St Edmunds and Trinity College, Cambridge.

He was appointed as a justice of the peace for Suffolk in 1662 and was knighted on 8 May 1663. He became a Deputy Lieutenant for the county in 1685. The same year, Wenyeve was elected as a Member of Parliament for Sudbury as a Tory. In Parliament, he was nominated to ten committees, including those set up to consider expiring laws, wool and corn prices, the prevention of clandestine marriages, the improvement of tillage, and the encouragement of shipbuilding. He opposed James II's policy of repealing the Test Acts and penal laws, and was removed from local office in the summer of 1688. He did not stand for re-election in 1689 and he refused to sign the Association of 1696. Wenyeve died in 1706.

Parliament of England
Preceded by Gervase Elwes; Sir Gervase Elwes, Bt	Member of Parliament for Sudbury; 1685–1687; With: Sir John Cordell, Bt	Succeeded by John Poley; Philip Gurdon
