= Sir Gervase Elwes, 1st Baronet =

English politician

Arms of Sir Gervase Elwes, 1st Baronet are Or, a bend gules, surmounted by a fesse azure.

Sir Gervase Elwes, 1st Baronet (bapt. 21 August 1628 – 11 April 1706) was an English Court Whig politician who sat in the House of Commons at various times between 1677 and 1706.

Elwes was the son of Sir Gervase Elwes, of Woodford, Essex and his wife Frances, the daughter of Sir Robert Lee of Billesley, Warwickshire. He was baptised on 21 August 1628, at St Mary's Bothaw, London. He succeeded his father in April 1653, and at the Restoration was created a baronet on 22 June 1660.

In 1677, Elwes was elected Member of Parliament for Sudbury in a by-election to the Cavalier Parliament. He was elected MP for Suffolk in the first election of 1679 and for Sudbury again in the second election in 1679. He was re-elected MP for Sudbury in 1681. In 1690 he was elected MP for Suffolk again. He was elected MP for Sudbury again in 1700 and sat until 1706, and was sometime Lieutenant of the Tower of London.

== Marriage ==
He married Amy Trigge, daughter of physician William Trigge, of Highworth, Wiltshire.

Sir Gervase Elwes died in April 1706 around the age of 77 and was buried at Stoke. (See Elwes baronets and Elwes for his descendants.) His grandson inherited the baronetcy.

Parliament of England
Preceded by Thomas Waldegrave; Sir Robert Cordell, 1st Baronet	Member of Parliament for Sudbury; 1677–1679; With: Sir Robert Cordell, 1st Baronet	Succeeded by Sir Robert Cordell, 1st Baronet; Gervase Elwes
Preceded by Henry Felton; Sir Samuel Barnardiston, 1st Baronet	Member of Parliament for Suffolk; 1679; With: Sir Samuel Barnardiston, 1st Baronet	Succeeded by Sir William Spring, 2nd Baronet; Sir Samuel Barnardiston, 1st Baronet
Preceded by Sir Robert Cordell, 1st Baronet; Gervase Elwes	Member of Parliament for Sudbury; 1679–1685; With: Gervase Elwes	Succeeded by Sir John Cordell, 2nd Baronet; Sir George Wenyeve
Preceded by Sir John Cordell, 2nd Baronet; Sir John Rous, 2nd Baronet	Member of Parliament for Suffolk; 1690–1698; With: Sir Samuel Barnardiston, 1st Baronet	Succeeded by The Earl of Dysart; Sir Samuel Barnardiston, 1st Baronet
Preceded by Samuel Kekewich; John Gurdon	Member of Parliament for Sudbury; 1700–1706; With: John Gurdon 1700–1701; Sir John Cordell, 3rd Baronet 1701; Joseph Haskin Stiles 1701–1703; George Dashwood 1703–1705; Philip Skippon 1705–1706	Succeeded by Sir Hervey Elwes, 2nd Baronet; Philip Skippon
Baronetage of England
New creation	Baronet (of Stoke); 1660–1706	Succeeded by Hervey Elwes
