= Ripley baronets of Acacia (1897) =

Escutcheon of the Ripley baronets of Acacia

The Ripley baronetcy, of "Acacia", Rawdon, in the County of York, was created in the Baronetage of the United Kingdom on 4 September 1897 for Frederick Ripley, head of F. Ripley & Co. of Bradford, the third son of the 1st Baronet of the 1880 creation. The title became extinct on the death of the 3rd Baronet in 1954.

== Ripley baronets, of Acacia (1897) ==
- Sir Frederick Ripley, 1st Baronet (1846–1907)
- Sir Frederick Hugh Ripley, 2nd Baronet (1878–1945)
- Sir Geoffrey Arnold Ripley, 3rd Baronet (1883–1954), left no heir.

== Notes ==
Baronetage of the United Kingdom
| Preceded by Pender baronets | Ripley baronets of Acacia; 4 September 1897 | Succeeded by Smith baronets |
