= Sir John Cordell, 3rd Baronet =

English politician (1677–1704)

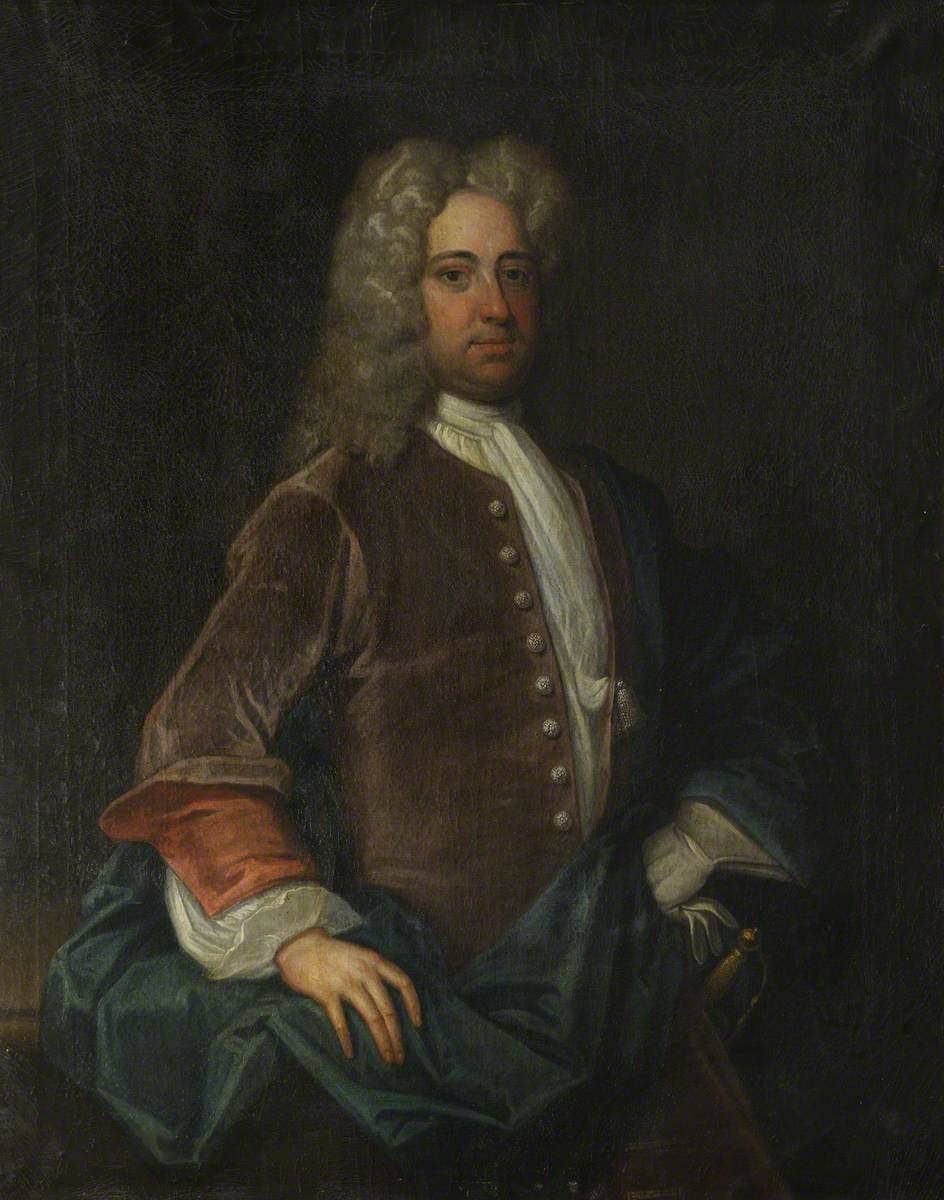
Sir John Cordell, 3rd Baronet

Sir John Cordell, 3rd Baronet (baptized 11 November 1677 – died 8 May 1704) was an English Tory politician who sat in the House of Commons in 1701.

Cordell was only son of Sir John Cordell, 2nd Baronet, to whose baronetcy and estates at Long Melford, Suffolk, he succeeded in 1690 as a child.

Cordell was a member (MP) of the parliament of England for Sudbury February to November 1701. During that period he was one of a number of Members who were blacklisted for opposing preparations for war against France. He stood down in favour of his prospective father-in-law, Joseph Haskins Styles, acting as his agent in the succeeding elections.

Cordell married Eleanor Styles on 24 December (Christmas Eve) in 1701, but had no children. After he was killed in a fall from his horse in 1704 his baronetcy became extinct and his estates were divided between his two sisters. Melford Hall would eventually pass to his nephew, Sir Cordell Firebrace, 3rd Baronet.

Parliament of England
Preceded by Sir Gervase Elwes, Bt; John Gurdon	Member of Parliament for Sudbury; 1701; With: Sir Gervase Elwes, Bt	Succeeded by Sir Gervase Elwes, Bt; Joseph Haskin Stiles
Baronetage of England
Preceded by John Cordell	Baronet (of Long Melford); 1690–1704	Extinct
