= Edward William Barnard =

English divine, poet and scholar

Edward William Barnard (1791–1828), was an English divine, poet and scholar.

== Life ==
Barnard was educated at Harrow School and Trinity College. In 1817 he published anonymously, 'Poems, founded upon the Poems of Meleager,' which were re-edited in 1818 under the title of 'Trifles, imitative of the Chaster Style of Meleager.' The latter volume was dedicated to Thomas Moore, who tells us in his journal that he had the manuscript to look over, and describes the poems as 'done with much elegance.' Barnard was presented to the living of Brantingthorp, Yorkshire, from which is dated his next publication, 'The Protestant Beadsman' (1822), This is described by a writer in Notes and Queries as a "delightful little volume on the saints and martyrs commemorated by the English church, containing biographical notices of them, and hymns upon each of them." Barnard died prematurely on 10 January 1828. He was at that time collecting materials for an elaborate life of the Italian poet Marcantonio Flaminio, born at the end of the fifteenth century, and had got together "numerous extracts, memoranda, and references from a wide range of contemporary and succeeding authors." The life was to accompany a translation of Flaminio's best pieces, but unfortunately the work was only partially completed at the author's death. Such translations as were ready for publication were edited for private circulation, along with some of Barnard's original poems, by Francis Wrangham, the editor of Langhorne's Plutarch. The title of this volume, published in 1829, is Fifty Select Poems of Marc-Antonio Flaminio, imitated by the late Rev. Edw. Will. Barnard, M.A. of Trinity College, Cambridge, and a short memoir by Wrangham is prefixed. Barnard had also projected a History of the English Church, and collected many valuable materials for the work.

He married the daughter of Francis Wrangham, and is said to have made a "most exemplary parish priest".
