= Quilter baronets =

Baronetcy in the Baronetage of the United Kingdom

Escutcheon of the Quilter baronets of Bawdsey Manor

The Quilter baronetcy, of Bawdsey Manor in Bawdsey in the County of Suffolk, is a title in the Baronetage of the United Kingdom. It was created on 13 September 1897 for the businessman and politician William Quilter. He was Member of Parliament for Sudbury from 1885 to 1906.

The 2nd Baronet was also a politician, Member of Parliament for Sudbury from 1910 to 1918.

== Quilter baronets, of Bawdsey Manor (1897) ==
- Sir William Cuthbert Quilter, 1st Baronet (1841–1911)
- Sir (William Eley) Cuthbert Quilter, 2nd Baronet (1873–1952)
- Sir (John) Raymond Cuthbert Quilter, 3rd Baronet (1902–1959). He was an aviation enthusiast and developer of static line parachutes later used by British troops.
- Sir Anthony Raymond Leopold Cuthbert Quilter, 4th Baronet (1937–2014)
- Sir Guy Raymond Cuthbert Quilter, 5th Baronet (born 1967).

The heir apparent to the baronetcy is the 5th Baronet's eldest son, William Raymond Cuthbert Quilter (born 1995).

== Extended family ==
Roger Quilter, third son of the 1st Baronet, was a composer.

== Bawdsey Manor and Sutton Hall ==
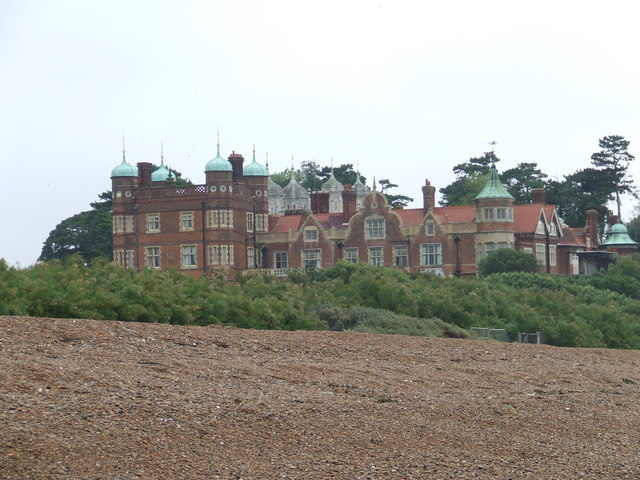
Bawdsey Manor, former seat of the Quilter family

The family seat, Bawdsey Manor, was requisitioned by the Devonshire Regiment during the First World War and returned to the family afterwards. It was later sold to the Air Ministry in 1936 for a research station for the development of radio direction finding. In June 2018 the family seat since the late 19th century, Sutton Hall in Suffolk, was for sale by Sir Guy Quilter for £31.5m with 2,177 acres (881 ha).

Baronetage of the United Kingdom
Preceded by Smith baronets	Quilter baronets of Bawdsey Manor; 13 September 1897	Succeeded by Wood baronets
