= Henry Burton (Conservative politician) =

British politician

Burton in 1926.

Henry Walter Burton (December 1876 – 23 November 1947) was a Conservative Party politician in the United Kingdom.

He was elected at the 1924 general election as Member of Parliament (MP) for the Sudbury constituency in Suffolk, with a majority of 1 over the sitting Liberal MP John Frederick Loverseed.

Burton held the seat until his defeat at the 1945 general election by the Labour party candidate Roland Hamilton.

Parliament of the United Kingdom
Preceded by Frederick Loverseed	Member of Parliament for Sudbury; 1924–1945	Succeeded by Roland Hamilton
