= Herbert Mercer =

British Officer

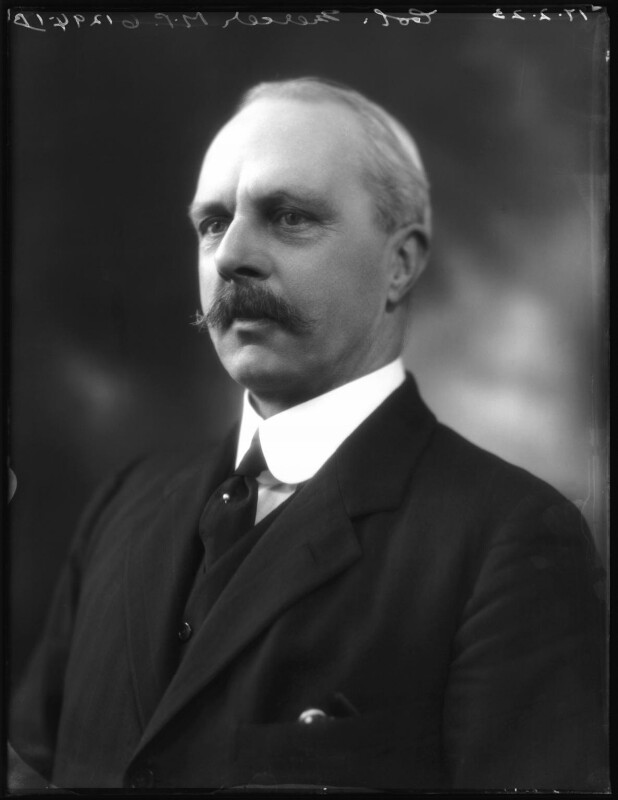
- Mercer in 1923
- Born: 7 January 1862; Boxley, Kent, England
- Died: 8 February 1944 (aged 82); Sussex, England
- Military career
- Allegiance: United Kingdom
- Branch: 3rd Dragoon Guards
- Service years: 1881–1908
- Rank: Colonel
- Conflicts: Second Boer War

Colonel Herbert Mercer (4 January 1862 – 8 February 1944) was a British Army officer and a Conservative politician and member of parliament in the 1920s.

== Early life ==
Mercer was born on 7 January 1862 in Boxley, Kent, the son of Richard Mercer, a banker. He was educated at Harrow School and entered Trinity College, Cambridge in 1880.

== Military career ==
Mercer was commissioned in April 1881 as a second lieutenant in the Duke of Edinburgh's Own Edinburgh militia. In January 1884 he was appointed as a lieutenant in the 3rd Dragoon Guards.

Later as a major he served in the Second Boer War.

On 2 July 1908 he was placed on half-pay after commanding the 3rd Dragoon Guards for several years.

During the First World War he commanded the 3rd Reserve Regiment.

== Parliamentary politics ==
Mercer was returned as the member of parliament for the Sudbury Division of Suffolk for the 1922 general election. He lost the seat in the 1923 election to Liberal politician John Frederick Loverseed.

== Death ==
Mercer died on 8 February 1944 at Rotherfield, and was buried at Stradishall. He had married in 1906 Elizabeth Bower, daughter of Thomas Bower of Stradishall Place, Suffolk.

Parliament of the United Kingdom
Preceded by Stephen Howard	Member of Parliament for Sudbury; 1922–1923	Succeeded by Frederick Loverseed
