= Harry Quilter =

English painter

Harry Quilter (24 January 1851 in London – 10 July 1907 in London), was an English art critic, writer and artist.

== Life ==
He was the youngest of five children of William Quilter (1808–1888), first president of the Institute of Accountants, and a collector of watercolours, and younger brother of William Cuthbert Quilter the politician. His mother, his father's first wife, was Elizabeth Harriet, daughter of Thomas Cuthbert. Born at Lower Norwood, south London, on 24 January 1851, Harry Quilter was educated privately, and entered Trinity College, Cambridge, at Michaelmas 1870; he graduated B.A. in 1874 and proceeded M.A. in 1877. At Cambridge he played billiards and racquets, and read metaphysics, graduating the Moral Sciences Tripos of 1873 in the third class.

Quilter was intended for a business career, but on leaving university travelled abroad, and studied in Italy. A student of the Inner Temple from 3 May 1872, on returning to England he spent six months in studying for the bar, mainly with John Fletcher Moulton; he also attended the Slade School of Art at University College and the Middlesex Hospital. He was called to the bar on 18 November 1878. An attack of confluent smallpox damaged his health.

Quilter subsequently did not settle into a career, but undertook numerous projects. Between 1879 and 1887 he lectured on art and literature in London and the provinces. In 1885 he studied landscape painting at Van Hove's studio at Bruges, and in 1886 was an unsuccessful candidate for the Slade professorship at Cambridge in succession to Sidney Colvin. From 1894 to 1896 he ran boarding schools at Mitcham and Liverpool on a system which he had himself formulated, and on which he wrote an article, "In the Days of her Youth", in the Nineteenth Century (June 1895).

Quilter developed a late friendship with novelist Wilkie Collins, with their correspondence beginning in early 1887. In a letter dated January 1888, Collins wrote to him: “I am proud and happy. Proud to have been the subject of such criticism as yours, and happy—at my age, when death has robbed me of many friends—to have found a friend who fills one of the vacant places in my regard.”

== Feud with Whistler ==
As a critic Quilter roused the anger of J. M. Whistler by his frank criticism of the artist's Venetian etchings. He further angered Whistler by his "vandalism" in re-decorating Whistler's White House, Chelsea, which he purchased on 18 September 1879 and occupied till 1888. Whistler had had to sell the house after winning his libel case against John Ruskin but being awarded only a farthing in damages: his legal costs bankrupted him; Quilter refused then to sell it back. Whistler's antipathy to critics was concentrated upon Quilter, to whom he always referred as "Arry" and whom he lashed unsparingly at his death.

== Last years ==
Until the end of his life Quilter occupied himself with periodical writing, travelling, and collecting works of art. He died at 42 Queen's Gate Gardens, London in 1907, and was buried at Norwood. Most of his collections were sold at Christie's in April 1906, and fetched over £14,000.

His epitaph reads: “I tried to tell the truth. We do what we can.”

== Works ==
From 1876 to 1887 Quilter was an art critic and journalist, writing chiefly for The Spectator. In 1880–81 he was also for a time art critic for The Times in succession to Tom Taylor.

In January 1888 Quilter started an ambitious periodical, the Universal Review. The first number was published on 16 May 1888; it was illustrated, and contained articles by leading British and French writers. George Meredith contributed in 1889 his Jump to Glory Jane. After initial success there were money troubles, and the Review ended with the issue for December 1890.

The Universal Review included essays on women’s education and political reform, as well as contributions from artists associated with the suffrage and Arts and Crafts movements.

In 1902 Quilter published What's What, a miscellany; of the 1182 pages he wrote about a third, containing 350,000 words. His other publications included:

- A volume of light verse, Idle Hours, by "Shingawn" (a name taken from a sensational story in the London Journal of the time), 1872.
- Giotto, 1880; new edit. 1881.
- The Academy: Notice of Pictures exhibited at the R.A. 1872-82, 1883.
- Sententiæ Artis: First Principles of Art, 1886.
- Preferences in Art, Life, and Literature, 1892.
- Opinions on Men, Women and Things, 1909 (a collection of periodical essays made by his widow).

He edited an edition of Meredith's Jump to Glory Jane (1892).

Besides writing, Quilter was a collector and a practising artist. His work was regularly hung at the Institute of Painters in Oil Colours from 1884 to 1893. Quilter exhibited his paintings at the Dudley Gallery in January 1894, and a collection of his works in oils, sketches in wax, watercolours on vellum, chiefly of Cornish scenes, was shown at the New Dudley Gallery in February 1908. He illustrated Robert Browning's Pied Piper of Hamelin (1898).

Quilter also co-edited The Photographic Art Journal with Fred C. Shardlow, contributing to the early art-photography movement.

== Family ==
Quilter married in 1890 Mary Constance Hall, who survived him with two sons and four daughters. Their daughter Gwendolen Harriet married A. P. Herbert.

His nephew Roger Quilter became a notable English art song composer, suggesting an enduring family engagement with the arts.

== Notes ==
Attribution

This article incorporates text from a publication now in the public domain: Stephen, Leslie, ed. (1885). "Quilter, Harry". Dictionary of National Biography. Vol. 3. London: Smith, Elder & Co.
