= Roland Hamilton =

Roland Hamilton (23 November 1886 – 10 February 1953) was a Labour Party politician in the United Kingdom.

In the Labour landslide at the 1945 general election, he was elected as member of parliament (MP) for Sudbury in Suffolk, which had been held by the Conservative Henry Burton since the 1924 election.

The Sudbury constituency was abolished for the 1950 general election, when Hamilton stood in the new Sudbury and Woodbridge constituency. He lost by over 4,500 votes to the Conservative John Hare, who had previously been MP for the also-abolished Woodbridge constituency.

Parliament of the United Kingdom
Preceded by Henry Burton	Member of Parliament for Sudbury; 1945–1950	Constituency abolished
