= Thomas Jermyn (1561–1607) =

English Member of Parliament (1561–1607)

Thomas Jermyn (1561–1607) was an English politician.

Jermyn was the eldest son of John Jermyn and Mary Tollemache, and the nephew of Sir Robert Jermyn. He was educated at Corpus Christi College, Cambridge. In 1576 he married Sarah Harris, by whom he had one son and two daughters.

He was elected as the Member of Parliament for Sudbury in 1588 and assumed his seat in the 7th Parliament of Elizabeth I in early 1589, likely on the interest of Sir Francis Walsingham. He died in 1607.

Parliament of England
Preceded by Henry Blagge; Geoffrey Rusham	Member of Parliament for Sudbury; 1589; With: Thomas Eden	Succeeded by William Fortescue; Dudley Fortescue
