= Francis Wrangham =

Archdeacon of the East Riding (1769–1842)

The Venerable Francis Wrangham
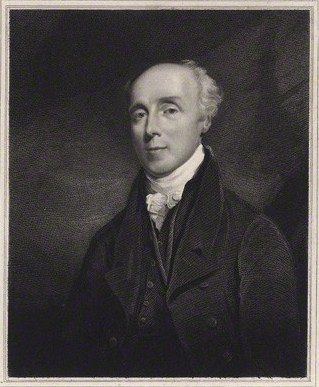
- Born: June 11, 1769; Raysthorpe, Yorkshire, England
- Died: December 27, 1842 (aged 73)
- Resting place: Chester Cathedral
- Education: Hull Grammar School; Magdalene College, Cambridge; Trinity Hall, Cambridge
- Occupations: Archdeacon, author, translator, book collector, abolitionist
- Spouse(s): Agnes Creyke (m. 1799; died 1800); Dorothy Cayley (m. 1801)
- Children: Agnes Frances Everilda Wrangham; George Walter Wrangham; Digby Cayley Wrangham; Lucy Charlotte Wrangham; Philadelphia Frances Esther Wrangham
- Parent(s): George Wrangham and Ann Fallowfield

The Venerable Francis Wrangham (11 June 1769 – 27 December 1842) was the Archdeacon of the East Riding. He was a noted author, translator, book collector and abolitionist.

== Life ==
Wrangham was born on 11 June 1769 at Raysthorpe, near Malton, Yorkshire, the son of George Wrangham (1741–1791), a prosperous farmer, and his wife Ann Fallowfield, who died in childbirth. He attended Hull Grammar School and took honours at Cambridge, studying first at Magdalene College and afterwards at Trinity Hall.

He was not elected to a Fellowship at Trinity Hall in 1793, on account of the electors not considering him to be “a fit and proper person”. Wrangham attempted to overturn this in the Courts, but the Lord Chancellor found that “however worthy and fit for greater and better situations, the whole college have thought [the gentleman] not fit to be elected into their society” and dismissed Wrangham's petition.

Wrangham was ordained in 1793 and instead became rector of Hunmanby in the East Riding. In England at that time, it was common for well-connected or conspicuously talented clerics to accumulate church positions, hiring curates to do the actual work. Wrangham's success resulted from his own talent and from an early position as tutor to the brother of the Duke of Manchester, and the lifelong friendship and patronage of the ducal family. In addition to being vicar of Humanby, Wrangham was vicar of Folkton, 1795–1821; Fellow of the Royal Society, 15 November 1804; examining chaplain to Vernon Harcourt, Archbishop of York, 1814–34; Archdeacon of Cleveland, 1820–28; vicar of Thorpe Bassett, 1821–27; Prebendary of York, 1823; rector of Dodleston, Cheshire, and Prebendary of Chester, 1827–42; and Archdeacon of the East Riding, 1828–41.

Wrangham was a member of the Roxburghe Club. He is buried in the lady chapel of Chester Cathedral, which contains a monument to him by Hardman & Co., dating from 1846.

== Works ==
Wrangham was a well-known and widely read poet, essayist and translator of Greek and Latin literature. He was an advocate for the abolition of slavery, the education of women, Catholic rights, charity schools, free libraries, charity hospitals and other progressive social ideas. His theology was orthodox. He opposed deists, dissenters, and Unitarians, and supported foreign missions, writing one book on methods for converting India to Christianity.

He was the author in 1794 of The Restoration of the Jews, a poem advocating the return of the Jews to the Land of Israel, that won the Cambridge University Seaton poetry prize. The poem includes a strong anti-slavery statement:

157: And thou bethink thee, Albion, ere too late,
158: Queen of the isles and mart of distant worlds,
159: That thou like Tyre (with hands as deep in blood,
160: Warm from the veins of Africa, and wealth
161: By arts more vile and darker guilt acquir'd)
162: Shalt meet an equal doom. The day will rise...

Other Wrangham, prize-winning poems well known at the time, include 'The Holy Land', 'Sufferings of the Primitive Martyrs', 'Joseph Made Known to his Brethren', and 'The Destruction of Babylon.' Wrangham's first book of poems is noteworthy because it contained a translation of one of Wrangham's Latin poems by Coleridge, and one of Wrangham's French poems by Wordsworth. His books of poetry include The Raising of Jaïrus' Daughter (1804); A Poem on the Restoration of Learning in the East (1805); Death of Saul and Jonathan (1813); Poetical Sketches of Scarborough (1813); Poems (1814); and The Quadrupeds' Feast (1830).

Wrangham's published translations from ancient Greek, Latin, French, and Italian include A Few Sonnets Attempted from Petrarch in Early Life (1817); The Lyrics of Horace (1821) a translation of Virgil's Eclogues (1830); and Homerics (1834), translations of Iliad, book 3, and Odyssey, book 5. He published numerous sermons and pamphlets on political topics, and wrote regularly for Blackwood's Magazine, the Gentleman's Magazine, and the Classical Journal.

John Cole included a catalogue of Wrangham's library in A Bibliographical and Descriptive Tour of Scarborough (1824). Two years later Wrangham himself published The English Portion of the Library of the Ven. Francis Wrangham (1826).

== Family ==
Wrangham was twice married. He married at Bridlington, on 7 April 1799, Agnes, fifth daughter of Colonel Ralph Creyke of Marton in Yorkshire. She died in childbed on 9 March 1800, aged 21; but her daughter survived. Wrangham married, secondly, at Brompton, near Scarborough, in 1801, Dorothy, second daughter and coheiress of Rev. Digby Cayley of Yorkshire, who brought him £700 a year. She had issue two sons and three daughters.

Of his daughters:

- Agnes Frances Everilda, daughter of the first marriage, on 16 June 1832 married Robert Isaac Wilberforce, who succeeded her father as archdeacon of the East Riding.
- Lucy Charlotte, eldest daughter of the second marriage, married Henry Raikes, and was mother of Henry Cecil Raikes.
- Philadelphia Frances Esther, third daughter of the second marriage, married Edward William Barnard.

The first son George Walter became vicar of Ampleforth; the second son Digby Cayley Wrangham (1805–1863) was a barrister and Tory politician.

There is a Wrangham family genealogy at http://genealogy.avendano.org/wrangham2.php.
