= William Heaton-Armstrong =

British Liberal Party politician, merchant and banker

Member of Parliament for Sudbury
- In office 12 January 1906 – 15 January 1910
- Preceded by: Sir William Quilter
- Succeeded by: Sir Cuthbert Quilter

Personal details
- Born: 1 September 1853 Gmunden, Austria
- Died: 20 July 1917 (aged 63)
- Party: Liberal
- Relations: Georgie Dansey (descendent)
- Children: 3 (including John)

William Charles Heaton-Armstrong (1 September 1853 – 20 July 1917) was a British Liberal Party politician, merchant and banker.

== Background ==
He was born in Gmunden, Austria. He was a son of John Heaton-Armstrong. He was educated partly in Austria and partly in Ireland. He succeeded on the death of his father to the senior representation of the families of Heaton-Armstrong, Armstrong of Mangerton, Mount Heaton and Farney Castle, Macdonnell of New Hall, and Heaton of Yorkshire. He married in 1885, the Baronesse Bertha Maxmiliana Zois-Edelstein; oldest surviving daughter of 4th Baron Zois-Edelstein, of Austria. They had two sons, Duncan Heaton-Armstrong and John Heaton-Armstrong, and one daughter.

== Career ==
In his youth he joined the British Merchant Navy. In 1876 he joined the Turkish Navy to fight in the Russo-Turkish War. In the 1880s he got involved in the Chilean-Peruvian War assisting Chile. He visited nearly all the Colonies, and travelled very extensively. His first involvement in politics came when he stood as a Conservative candidate contesting Mid Tipperary at the General Election in 1892 against the separation of Ireland from England. He stood as a Loyalist in favour of granting local self-government to the greatest possible extent to Ireland. Thereafter he switched his allegiance to the Liberal Party. He was Liberal MP for the Sudbury Division of Suffolk from 1906 to 1910. He gained Sudbury from the Liberal Unionists at the 1906 General Election. He served just one parliamentary term. He did not defend his seat at the January 1910 General Election and retired from politics. He then went into banking, financing railways in Jersey and British Columbia. Armstrong, British Columbia was named after him. He was a Fellow of the Royal Astronomical Society, Royal Zoological Society, Royal Botanic Society, Royal Statistical Society, and other learned Societies. He had published the 'Calculation of the Sun's Meridian Altitude'. He was Lord of the manor of Roscrea.

== Family ==
His descendent Georgie Dansey is a New Zealand MP.

== Sources ==
- Who Was Who
- British parliamentary election results 1885–1918, Craig, F. W. S.

Parliament of the United Kingdom
Preceded by William Quilter	Member of Parliament for Sudbury; 1906 – January 1910	Succeeded by Cuthbert Quilter
