= Digby Cayley Wrangham =

English barrister and politician

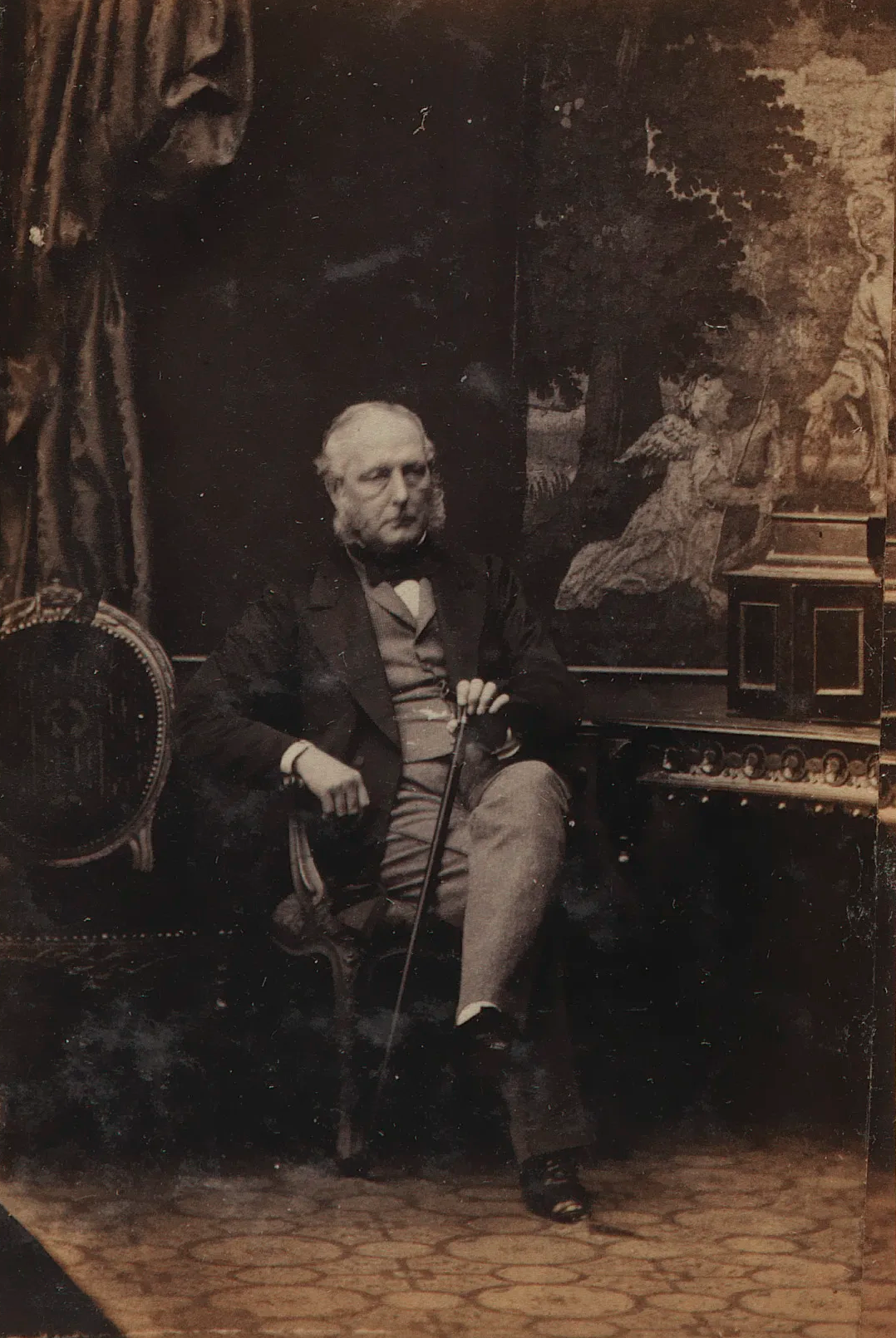
Wrangham in 1862

Digby Cayley Wrangham (16 June 1805 – 10 March 1863) was an English barrister and politician.

== Life ==
He was the second son of Francis Wrangham. He graduated B.A. with a double first-class from Brasenose College, Oxford, in 1826. After leaving Oxford, he was for some years private secretary to Lord Aberdeen in the Foreign Office.

Called to the bar from Gray's Inn in 1831, Wrangham was the same year elected Member of Parliament for Sudbury. He served until 1832, then was created Queen's serjeant in 1847, and became father of the parliamentary bar.

== Family ==
Wrangham married Amelia, daughter of Walter Fawkes. They had two sons and two daughters. Of the sons, Digby Strangeways Wrangham was a clergyman and writer.

== Notes ==
Attribution

This article incorporates text from a publication now in the public domain: Lee, Sidney, ed. (1900). "Wrangham, Francis". Dictionary of National Biography. Vol. 63. London: Smith, Elder & Co.
