= Charles Wyatt (architect) =

English architect and Member of Parliament

Charles Wyatt (1758 – 13 March 1819) was an English architect and Member of Parliament for Sudbury, Suffolk.

== Life ==
Charles Wyatt was the son of William Wyatt (died 1780, steward to Lord Uxbridge in Staffordshire), nephew to the architects James Wyatt and Samuel Wyatt, and cousin to Sir Jeffry Wyattville.

He joined the East India Company in 1780 as a cadet, and sailed for India aboard the ship Mount Stewart on 27 June. However, the ship was captured by the French and Spanish fleets and returned to England. His second attempt to reach India was successful, and he finally arrived in 1782. He joined the Bengal Engineers of the Bengal Army, eventually being promoted to captain in 1800.

His opportunity to design buildings came in 1798 when Viceroy and Governor-General Richard Wellesley arrived in Calcutta and selected Wyatt to design the new Government House. Built from 1799 to 1803, it was based on the design of Kedleston Hall. Wyatt also designed alterations to Wellesley's country residence at Barrackpore. In June 1803 he was made Superintendent of Public Works.

Having made a fortune in India, Wyatt retired in October 1806, buying the country villa called Ealing Grove outside London, not far from Sir John Soane's villa at Pitzhanger Manor. He was elected as Tory MP for Sudbury, Suffolk in two successive parliaments, serving from 1812 to 1818.

He died in 1819 at Foley House, his London home in Portland Place.

He had married Charlotte Drake (née Greentree), widow of George Drake of the Bombay Marines in 1787.

== Gallery of architectural work ==
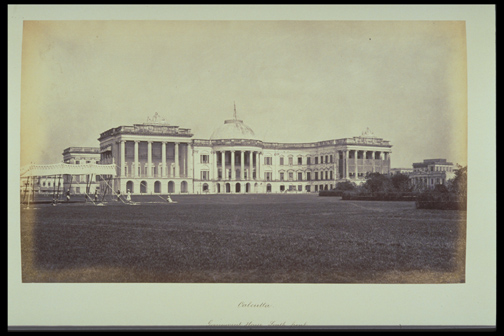
Government House, Calcutta

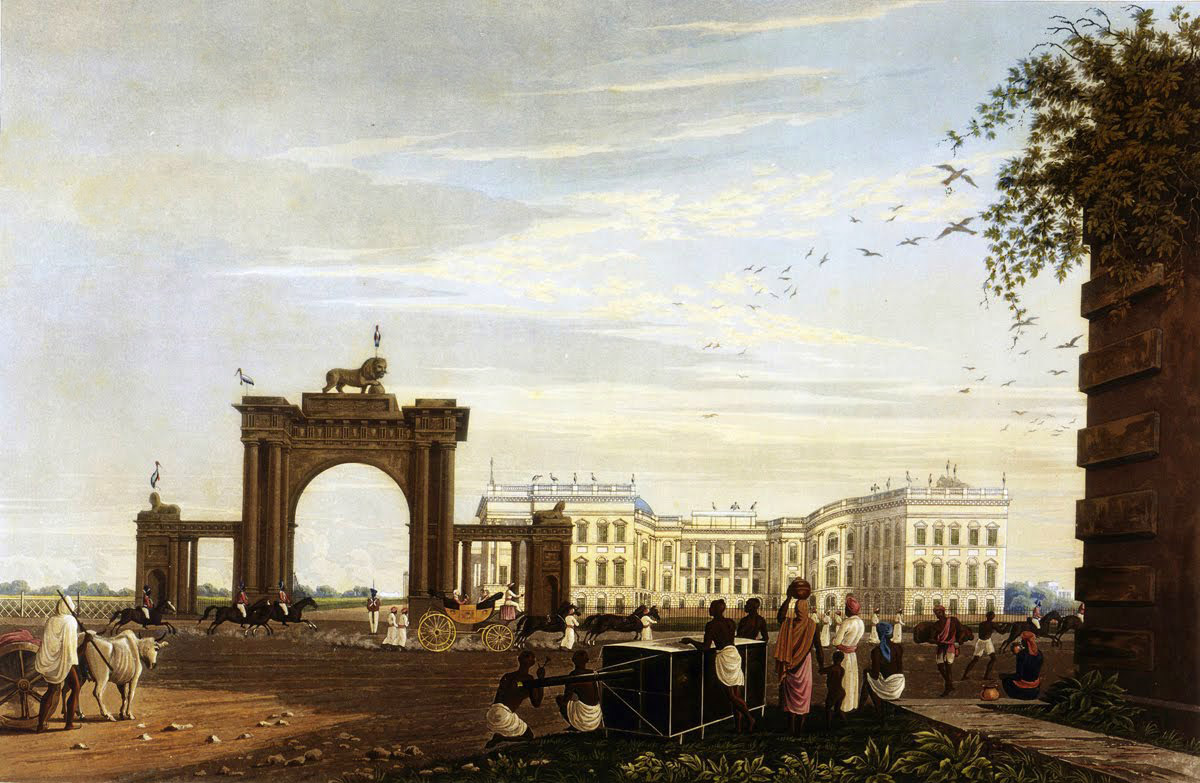
East view of Government House, Calcutta

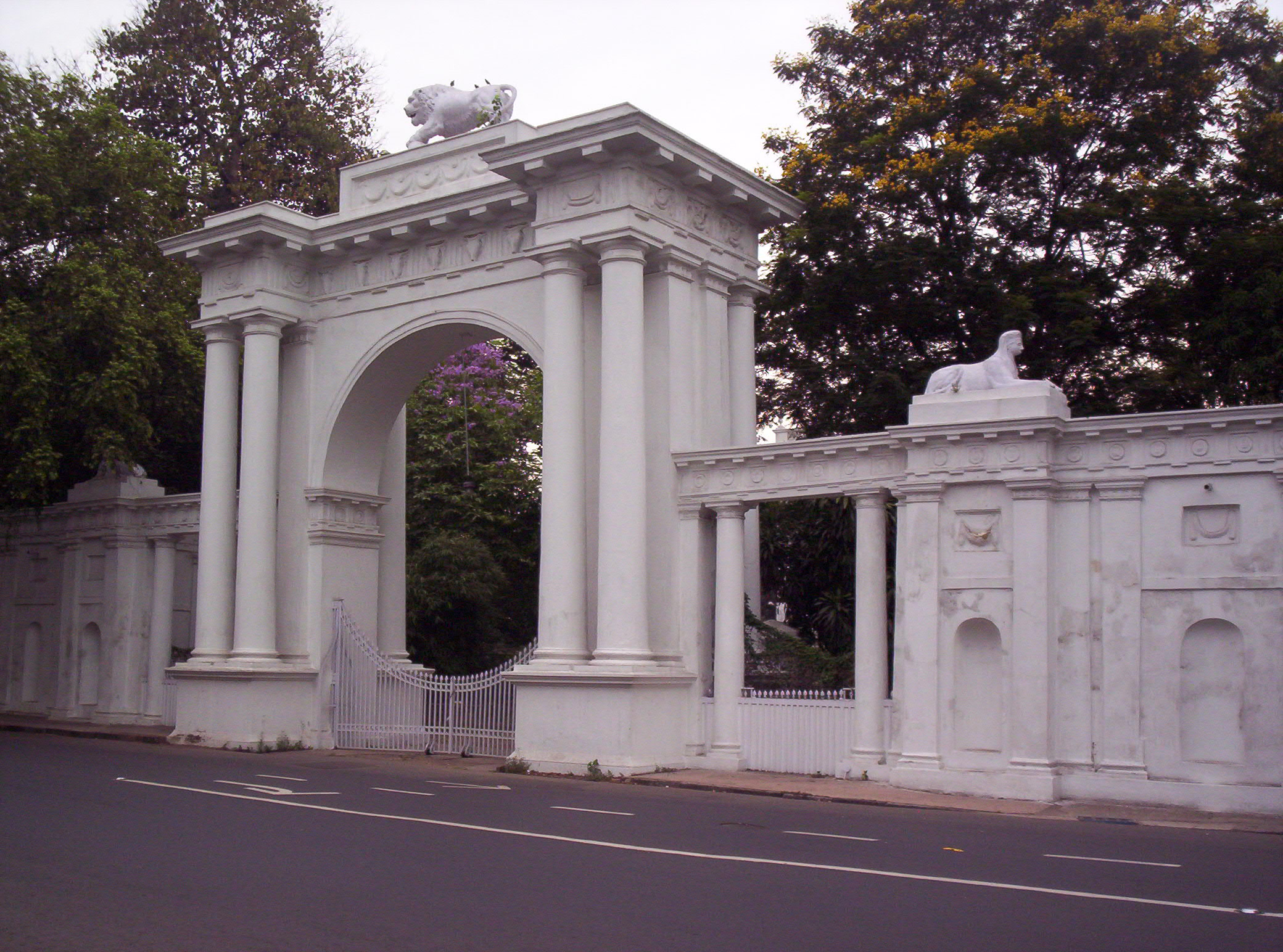
Gate, Government House

== See also ==
- Wyatts, an architectural dynasty
