= Samuel Kekewich (Sudbury MP) =

Samuel Kekewich was Member of Parliament for Sudbury between 1698 and his death in 1700.
