= Sir Cuthbert Quilter, 2nd Baronet =

English Conservative Party politician

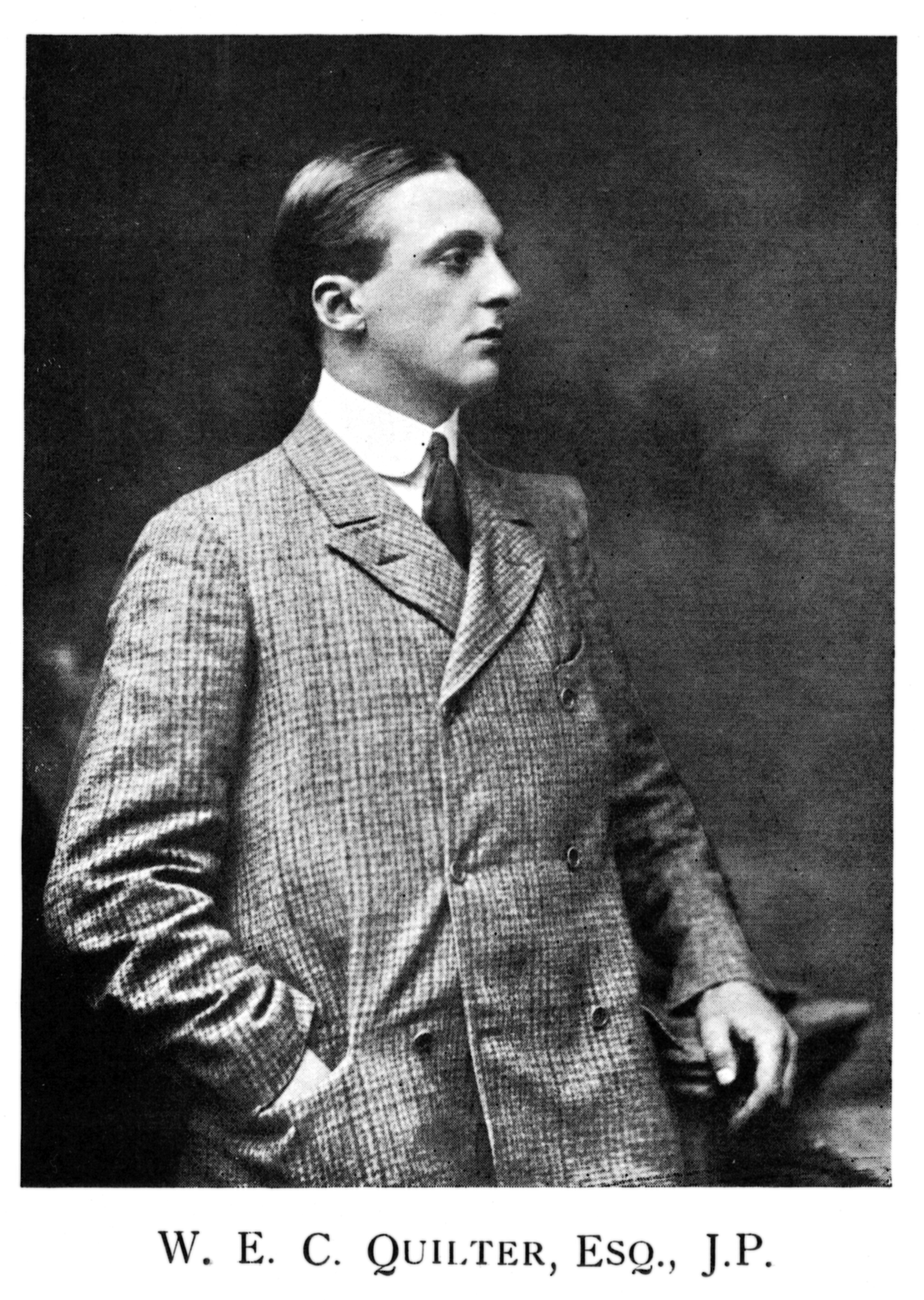
Cuthbert Quilter in 1906 or earlier

Sir William Eley Cuthbert Quilter, 2nd Baronet (17 July 1873 – 18 September 1952) was an English Conservative Party politician.

Quilter was the son of the Liberal politician Sir William Quilter, 1st Baronet (1841–1911). His younger brother was the composer Roger Quilter.

He was commissioned a second-lieutenant of the Suffolk Yeomanry (The Duke of York's Own Loyal Suffolk Hussars) on 26 March 1902.

He commissioned a house designed by Detmar Blow, and built in South Street, Mayfair, London, in 1902–1903. It was later the home of Lord Dunglass, the birthplace of Alec Douglas-Home, and the home of Dame Barbara Cartland.

He was elected at the January 1910 general election as Member of Parliament (MP) for Sudbury in Suffolk, a constituency held by his father until 1906. He held the seat until the 1918 general election, when he did not stand again.

Parliament of the United Kingdom
Preceded by William Heaton-Armstrong	Member of Parliament for Sudbury; January 1910 – 1918	Succeeded by Stephen Howard
Baronetage of the United Kingdom
Preceded by William Quilter	Baronet (of Bawdsey Manor); 1911 – 1952	Succeeded by John Raymond Cuthbert Quilter
