= Sir Cuthbert Quilter, 1st Baronet =

British politician (1841–1911)

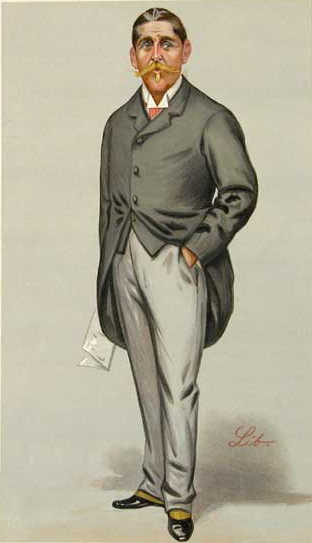
"in Society and a Member of Parliament" Quilter as caricatured by Liborio Prosperi in Vanity Fair, February 1889

Sir William Cuthbert Quilter, 1st Baronet (29 January 1841 – 18 November 1911) was an English stock broker, art collector and Liberal/Liberal Unionist politician who sat in the House of Commons from 1885 to 1906.

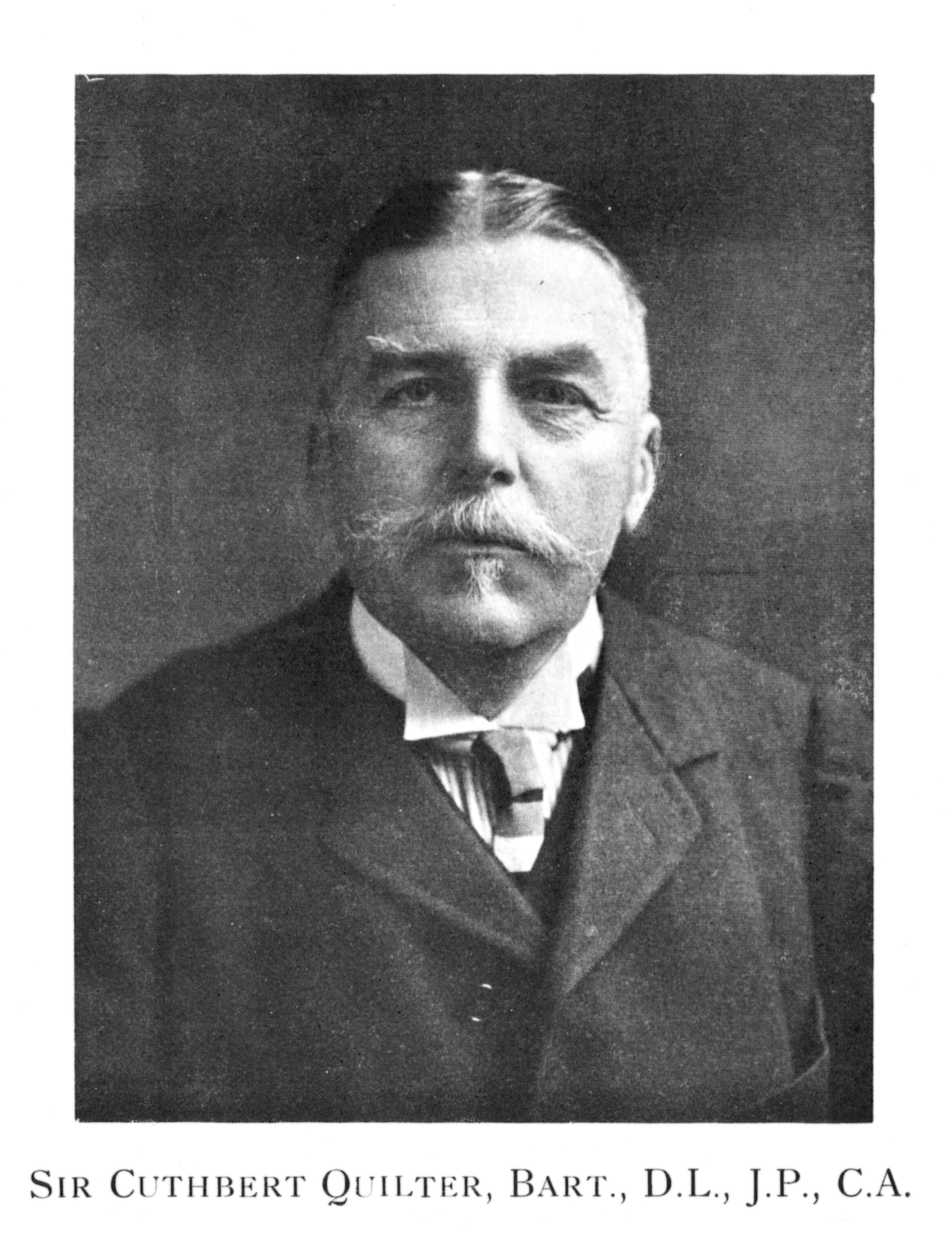
Sir Cuthbert in 1906 or earlier

== Life ==
Quilter was born at Finsbury, the son of William Quilter (1808–1888) and his wife Elizabeth Harriet Cuthbert. His father was a prominent accountant with the firm of Quilter, Ball & Co and was instrumental in the foundation of the Institute of Accountants.

Quilter was educated privately. He became a stockbroker and would eventually head the firm of Quilter Balfour & Co. He was an art collector, and one of the founders of the National Telephone Company. He was commodore of the Royal Harwich Yacht Club and a member of the council of the Yacht Racing Association.

In the 1885 general election, Quilter was elected Member of Parliament for Sudbury as a Liberal, and was returned in 1886 as a Liberal Unionist. In 1886, he introduced a bill 'for better securing the Purity of Beer'. He held the seat until 1906.

Quilter built Bawdsey Manor in 1886 and established a steam powered chain ferry (Bawdsey Ferry) in 1894 to cross the River Deben and provide access to Felixstowe railway station which ran until 1931. He enlarged the manor house in 1895. He also owned Hintlesham Hall. Quilter was created a baronet on 13 September 1897.

Quilter married Mary Ann Bevington in 1867. Their eldest son Cuthbert succeeded to the baronetcy and was also MP for Sudbury. His second son, Lt. Col. John Arnold Cuthbert Quilter served in the Royal Naval Division in World War 1, and was killed at Gallipoli on 6 May 1915. Quilter's battalion had included the poet Rupert Brooke, who had died of illness on 23 April. Another son Roger Quilter was a composer. Quilter's younger brother Harry was an eminent art critic. Quilter died at the age of 70.

Parliament of the United Kingdom
New constituency	Member of Parliament for Sudbury; 1885–1906	Succeeded by William Heaton-Armstrong
Baronetage of the United Kingdom
New creation	Baronet (of Bawdsey Manor); 1897–1911	Succeeded by Cuthbert Quilter
