= Stephen Howard (politician) =

British Liberal politician (1867–1934)

Stephen Goodwin Howard

Stephen Goodwin Howard CBE (1867 – 13 November 1934) was a British Liberal politician.

== Family ==
Howard was the son of Stephen Howard of Kirtling in Cambridgeshire. His family home was at The Moat, Upend. In 1895 he married Mary Maude Hailey. They a son and two daughters. Their son Stephen Gerald Howard QC was Conservative MP for Cambridgeshire from 1950 to 1961.

== Career ==
Howard described his profession as a tenant farmer and is recorded as owning land in Kirtling, very near the border with West Suffolk. He is described as one of the area's principal landowners. Howard also served in the 2nd Volunteer Battalion of the Cambridgeshire Regiment achieving the rank of Major.

== Parliamentary politics ==
Howard was President of East Cambridgeshire Liberal Association and was then selected as the candidate for the Sudbury Division of Suffolk for the 1918 general election. Although he was known to be a supporter of prime minister David Lloyd George he was elected as a Liberal without receiving the coalition coupon. However, once elected, he was one of nine such MPs to accept the Coalition whip in the ensuing Parliament. Another historian says there were only eight such MPs but still includes Howard in the list. Howard was also one of a very few Liberals to win in a previously Conservative seat in 1918, so strong was the coalition government at that election. He defeated Captain R G Proby, who was standing as a Coalition Unionist

Howard also stood in Sudbury at the 1922 general election this time as a Lloyd George National Liberal. However he now faced Tory and Independent Liberal opponents and lost to Herbert Mercer, the Conservative.

== Cambridgeshire politics ==
Howard was a member of Cambridgeshire County Council. He was sometime chairman of the Main Roads Committee and of the Roads and Bridges Committee. He also served on the Joint Committee. He was created an Alderman and became chairman of the County Council in 1921. Howard was appointed a CBE in 1918. He was also appointed a deputy lieutenant of Cambridgeshire and served as a justice of the peace.

Parliament of the United Kingdom
Preceded by Sir Cuthbert Quilter, Bt.	Member of Parliament for Sudbury; 1918–1922	Succeeded by Herbert Mercer
