= Gervase Elwes, junior =

English politician

Gervase Elwes (c. 1657–c. 1687) was an English politician who sat in the House of Commons from 1679 to 1685.

Elwes was the son of Sir Gervase Elwes, 1st Baronet and his wife Amy Trigge, daughter of William Trigge, M.D., of Highworth, Wiltshire. In 1679, he was elected Member of Parliament for Sudbury in the two elections that year. He was commissioner for assessment for Suffolk and Sudbury from 1679 to 1680. He was elected MP for Sudbury again in 1681. In 1682 he became freeman of Preston.

Elwes died sometime between 13 April 1686 when he was mentioned in a codicil to his father's will and September 1688 when James II's electoral agents reported on Sudbury.

Elwes married Isabella Hervey, daughter of Sir Thomas Hervey of Ickworth, Suffolk and had two sons and two daughters.

Parliament of England
Preceded by Sir Robert Cordell, 1st Baronet; Sir Gervase Elwes, 1st Baronet	Member of Parliament for Sudbury; 1679–1685; With: Sir Robert Cordell, 1st Baronet 1679; Sir Gervase Elwes, 1st Baronet 1679–1685	Succeeded by Sir John Cordell, 2nd Baronet; Sir George Wenyeve
