= Sudbury (constituency) =

Parliamentary constituency in the United Kingdom, 1801-1844 & 1885–1950

- Former borough constituency for the House of Commons

1559–1844
- Seats: two

Sudbury
- Former county constituency for the House of Commons

1885–1950
- Seats: one
- Created from: Western Division of Suffolk
- Replaced by: Sudbury and Woodbridge

Sudbury was a parliamentary constituency which was represented in the House of Commons of the Parliament of the United Kingdom.

== History ==
Sudbury Disfranchisement Act 1843
- Act of Parliament
- Parliament of Great Britain
- Long title: An Act to indemnify Witnesses who may give Evidence before the Lords Spiritual and Temporal on a Bill to exclude the Borough of Sudbury from sending Burgesses to serve in Parliament.
- Citation: 6 & 7 Vict. c. 11
- Territorial extent: United Kingdom

Dates
- Royal assent: 11 April 1843
- Commencement: 11 April 1843 (Note: The Acts of Parliament (Commencement) Act 1793.)
- Repealed: 9 August 1874

Other legislation
- Repealed by: Statute Law Revision Act 1874 (No. 2)

Status: Repealed

Text of statute as originally enacted

A parliamentary borough consisting of the town of Sudbury in Suffolk, the constituency elected two Members of Parliament (MPs) by the bloc vote system of election to the House of Commons of England from 1559 to 1707, then to the House of Commons of Great Britain from 1707 to 1800, and to the House of Commons of the United Kingdom from 1801 until it was disenfranchised for corruption in 1844, after which it was absorbed into the Western Division of Suffolk. It was probably enfranchised through lobbying from Ambrose Cave the Chancellor of the Duchy of Lancaster who had interests in the area and could influence the choice of MPs. Sudbury had in the 18th century been seen as a particularly expensive seat but not under the influence of any patron and in the 1761 general election Horace Walpole the cousin of the outgoing MP, Thomas Walpole, had claimed that Sudbury had openly advertised itself for sale with the new MP, John Henniker having to spend £5,500 from the Duke of Newcastle's funds. but not under the influence of any patron The Sudbury election of 1835, which Charles Dickens reported for the Morning Chronicle, is thought by many experts to be the inspiration for the famous Eatanswill election in his novel Pickwick Papers.

The seat was re-established as one of five single-member county divisions of the Parliamentary County of Suffolk by the Redistribution of Seats Act 1885 for the 1885 general election, electing one MP by the first past the post voting system. It was abolished for the 1950 general election.

== Boundaries and boundary changes ==
=== 1885–1918 ===
- The part of the Municipal Borough of Sudbury in the county of Suffolk;
- The Sessional Divisions of Boxford, Cosford, Melford, and Risbridge; and
- Parts of the Sessional Divisions of Newmarket, and Thingoe and Thedwestry.

The county division was formed from part of the abolished Western Division and included the towns of Sudbury, Hadleigh and Haverhill.

=== 1918–1950 ===
- The Municipal Borough of Sudbury;
- The Urban Districts of Glemsford, Hadleigh, and Haverhill;
- The Rural Districts of Clare, Cosford, and Melford; and
- Parts of the Rural Districts of Moulton and Thingoe.

Marginal changes to boundaries.

On abolition, western and northern parts, including Haverhill, transferred to Bury St Edmunds. Central, southern and western parts, including Sudbury and Hadleigh, formed part of the new county constituency of Sudbury and Woodbridge.

== Members of Parliament ==
=== MPs 1559–1640 ===
Parliament	First member	Second member
1559	Clement Throckmorton	Henry Fortescue
1563	John Heigham	Thomas Andrews
1571	John Hunt	John Gurdon
1572	Richard Eden	Martin Cole
1584	Edward Waldegrave	Henry Blagge
1586	Henry Blagge	Geoffrey Rusham
1588	Thomas Eden	Thomas Jermyn
1593	William Fortescue	Dudley Fortescue
1597	George Waldegrave	John Clapham
1601	Philip Gawdy	Edward Glascock
1604–1611	Sir Thomas Beckingham	Thomas Eden, jnr
1614	Robert Crane	Henry Binge
1621	Edward Osborne	Brampton Gurdon
1624	Robert Crane	Sir William Pooley
1625	Sir Nathaniel Barnardiston	Robert Crane
1626	Sir Nathaniel Barnardiston	Thomas Smith
1628	Sir Robert Crane	Sir William Pooley
1629–1640	No Parliaments summoned	

=== MPs 1640–1844 ===
Year	First member	First party	Second member	Second party
April 1640	Sir Robert Crane	Parliamentarian	Richard Pepys	
November 1640	Sir Robert Crane	Parliamentarian	(Sir) Simonds d'Ewes	Parliamentarian
February 1643	Crane died – seat left vacant		(Sir) Simonds d'Ewes	Parliamentarian
1645	Brampton Gurdon	Parliamentarian	(Sir) Simonds d'Ewes	Parliamentarian
December 1648	Brampton Gurdon	Parliamentarian	D'Ewes ceased sitting after Pride's Purge	
1653	Sudbury was unrepresented in the Barebones Parliament			
1654	John Fothergill		Sudbury had only one seat in the First and Second Parliaments of the Protectorate	
1656	John Fothergill		Sudbury had only one seat in the First and Second Parliaments of the Protectorate	
January 1659	John Fothergill		Samuel Hassel	
May 1659	Not represented in the restored Rump			
April 1660	John Gurdon	Parliamentarian	Joseph Brand	
1661	Thomas Waldegrave		Isaac Appleton	
1662	Thomas Waldegrave		Sir Robert Cordell	Whig
1677	Sir Gervase Elwes	Whig	Sir Robert Cordell	Whig
February 1679	Gervase Elwes		Sir Robert Cordell	Whig
September 1679	Gervase Elwes		Sir Gervase Elwes	Whig
1685	Sir John Cordell	Tory	Sir George Wenyeve	Tory
1689	Sir John Poley	Tory	Philip Gurdon	Whig
February 1690	John Robinson	Whig	Philip Gurdon	Whig
October 1690	John Robinson	Whig	Sir Thomas Barnardiston	Whig
1698	Samuel Kekewich		Sir Thomas Barnardiston	Whig
1699	Samuel Kekewich		John Gurdon	Tory
1700	Sir Gervase Elwes	Whig	John Gurdon	Tory
January 1701	Sir Gervase Elwes	Whig	Sir John Cordell	Tory
December 1701	Sir Gervase Elwes	Whig	Joseph Haskin Stiles	Whig
1703	Sir Gervase Elwes	Whig	George Dashwood	Tory
1705	Sir Gervase Elwes	Whig	Philip Skippon	Whig
1706	Sir Hervey Elwes	Whig	Philip Skippon	Whig
1710	John Mead	Tory	Lieutenant-General Robert Echlin	Tory
1713	Sir Hervey Elwes	Whig	Lieutenant-General Robert Echlin	Tory
1715	Sir Hervey Elwes	Whig	Thomas Western	
1722	John Knight	Whig	Colonel William Windham	
1727	John Knight	Whig	Carteret Leathes	
January 1734	Richard Jackson		Carteret Leathes	
April 1734	Richard Price		Edward Stephenson	
1741	Thomas Fonnereau		Carteret Leathes	
1747	Thomas Fonnereau		Richard Rigby	Whig
1754	Thomas Fonnereau		Thomas Walpole	
1761	Thomas Fonnereau		John Henniker	
1768	(Sir) Patrick Blake		(Sir) Walden Hanmer	
1774	Thomas Fonnereau		Philip Champion Crespigny	Whig
1775	Sir Patrick Blake, Bt		Sir Walden Hanmer	
1780	Sir Patrick Blake, Bt		Philip Champion Crespigny	Whig
1781	Sir Patrick Blake, Bt		Sir James Marriott	
1784	William Smith	Whig	John Langston	
1790	John Hippisley	Whig	Thomas Champion Crespigny	
1796	William Smith	Whig	Sir James Marriott	
1802	Sir John Hippisley	Whig	John Pytches	Whig
1807	Sir John Hippisley	Whig	Emanuel Felix Agar	Tory
1812	Sir John Hippisley	Whig	Charles Wyatt	Tory
1818	William Heygate	Tory	John Broadhurst	Whig
1820	William Heygate	Tory	Charles Augustus Tulk	Whig
1826	John Wilks	Whig	Bethel Walrond	Whig
1828	John Norman Macleod	Tory	Bethel Walrond	Whig
1830	Sir John Walsh	Tory	Bethel Walrond	Whig
1831	Sir John Walsh	Tory	Digby Cayley Wrangham	Tory
1832	Sir John Walsh	Tory	Michael Angelo Taylor	Whig
Jul. 1834	Sir John Walsh	Tory	Sir Edward Barnes	Tory
Dec. 1834	Sir John Walsh	Conservative	Sir Edward Barnes	Conservative
1835	John Bagshaw	Whig	Benjamin Smith	Whig
July 1837	Sir James Hamilton	Conservative	Sir Edward Barnes	Conservative
December 1837	Joseph Bailey	Conservative	Sir Edward Barnes	Conservative
1838	Joseph Bailey	Conservative	Sir John Walsh	Conservative
1840	Joseph Bailey	Conservative	George Tomline	Conservative
1841	Frederick Villiers Meynell	Whig	David Ochterlony Dyce Sombre	Whig
29 July 1844	Constituency disfranchised for corruption and incorporated into Western Suffolk			

=== MPs 1885–1950 ===
Election	Member	Party
1885	Sir William Quilter	Liberal
1886	Sir William Quilter	Liberal Unionist
1906	William Heaton-Armstrong	Liberal
1910 (January)	Sir Cuthbert Quilter	Conservative
1918	Stephen Howard	Coalition Liberal
Jan 1922	Stephen Howard	National Liberal
Nov 1922	Herbert Mercer	Conservative
1923	Frederick Loverseed	Liberal
1924	Henry Walter Burton	Conservative
1945	Roland Hamilton	Labour
1950	constituency abolished	

== Elections ==
=== Elections in the 1830s ===
General election 1830: Sudbury
Party	Candidate	Votes	%
Whig	Bethel Walrond	Unopposed	
Tory	John Walsh	Unopposed	
Whig hold			
Tory gain from Whig			

General election 1831: Sudbury
Party	Candidate	Votes	%
Tory	John Walsh	544	46.0
Tory	Digby Cayley Wrangham	400	33.8
Whig	William Windham	239	20.2
Majority		161	13.6
Turnout		656	c. 65.6
Registered electors		c. 1,000	
Tory hold			
Tory gain from Whig			

General election 1832: Sudbury
Party	Candidate	Votes	%	±%
Whig	Michael Angelo Taylor	263	33.0	+22.9
Tory	John Walsh	253	31.8	−14.2
Tory	Digby Cayley Wrangham	234	29.4	−4.4
Whig	John Bagshaw	46	5.8	−4.3
Turnout		474	93.1	c. +27.5
Registered electors		509		
Majority		29	3.6	N/A
Whig gain from Tory		Swing	+16.1	
Majority		19	2.4	−11.2
Tory hold		Swing	−12.8	

Taylor's death caused a by-election.

By-election, 25 July 1834: Sudbury
Party	Candidate	Votes	%	±%
Tory	Edward Barnes	264	50.1	−11.1
Whig	John Bagshaw	263	49.9	+11.1
Majority		1	0.2	−2.2
Turnout		527	96.3	+3.2
Registered electors		547		
Tory gain from Whig		Swing	−11.1	

- Both candidates received the same number of votes, but the mayor's vote was added in favour of Barnes

General election 1835: Sudbury
Party	Candidate	Votes	%	±%
Whig	John Bagshaw	285	28.4	−4.6
Whig	Benjamin Smith	251	25.0	+19.2
Conservative	Edward Barnes	241	24.0	−7.8
Conservative	Stephens Lyne-Stephens	227	22.6	−6.8
Majority		10	1.0	−2.6
Turnout		527	95.1	+2.0
Registered electors		554		
Whig hold		Swing	+1.4	
Whig gain from Conservative		Swing	+13.3	

General election 1837: Sudbury
Party	Candidate	Votes	%	±%
Conservative	Edward Barnes	372	42.1	+18.1
Conservative	Sir James Hamilton, 2nd Baronet, of Woodbrook	342	38.7	+16.1
Whig	William Abel Smith	151	17.1	−11.3
Whig	Sir Thomas Edward Michell Turton, 2nd Baronet	19	2.1	−22.9
Majority		191	21.6	N/A
Turnout		502	83.8	−11.3
Registered electors		599		
Conservative gain from Whig		Swing	+17.6	
Conservative gain from Whig		Swing	+16.6	

Hamilton's resignation caused a by-election.

By-election, 12 December 1837: Sudbury
Party	Candidate	Votes	%	±%
Conservative	Joseph Bailey	303	54.3	−26.5
Whig	James Morrison	255	45.7	+26.5
Majority		48	8.6	−13.0
Turnout		558	92.7	+8.9
Registered electors		602		
Conservative hold		Swing	−26.5	

Barnes' death caused a by-election.

By-election, 27 March 1838: Sudbury
Party	Candidate	Votes	%	±%
Conservative	John Walsh	293	52.4	−28.4
Whig	John Bagshaw	266	47.6	+28.4
Majority		27	4.8	−16.8
Turnout		559	92.9	+9.1
Registered electors		602		
Conservative hold		Swing	−28.4	

=== Elections in the 1840s ===
Walsh resigned by accepting the office of Steward of the Chiltern Hundreds in order to contest a by-election at Radnorshire, which caused a by-election in Sudbury.

By-election, 5 June 1840: Sudbury
Party	Candidate	Votes	%	±%
Conservative	George Tomline	Unopposed		
Conservative hold				

General election 1841: Sudbury
Party	Candidate	Votes	%	±%
Whig	Frederick Villiers Meynell	284	25.5	+8.4
Whig	David Ochterlony Dyce Sombre	281	25.2	+23.1
Conservative	David Jones	274	24.6	−17.5
Conservative	Charles Taylor	274	24.6	−14.1
Majority		7	0.6	N/A
Turnout		557	92.4	+8.6
Registered electors		603		
Whig gain from Conservative		Swing	+12.1	
Whig gain from Conservative		Swing	+19.5	

After an election petition was lodged, a Royal Commission found proof of extensive bribery and the writ was suspended in 1844. The constituency was absorbed into West Suffolk.

=== Elections in the 1880s ===
General election 1885: Sudbury
Party	Candidate	Votes	%	±%
Liberal	Cuthbert Quilter	4,913	58.7	
Conservative	Thomas Weller Poley	3,461	41.3	
Majority		1,452	17.4	
Turnout		8,374	79.6	
Registered electors		10,522		
Liberal win (new seat)				

General election 1886: Sudbury
Party	Candidate	Votes	%	±%
Liberal Unionist	Cuthbert Quilter	Unopposed		
Liberal Unionist gain from Liberal				

=== Elections in the 1890s ===
General election 1892: Sudbury
Party	Candidate	Votes	%	±%
Liberal Unionist	Cuthbert Quilter	5,111	63.8	N/A
Liberal	Arthur Graeme Ogilvie	2,905	36.2	New
Majority		2,206	27.6	N/A
Turnout		8,016	75.4	N/A
Registered electors		10,638		
Liberal Unionist hold		Swing	N/A	

General election 1895: Sudbury
Party	Candidate	Votes	%	±%
Liberal Unionist	Cuthbert Quilter	Unopposed		
Liberal Unionist hold				

=== Elections in the 1900s ===
General election 1900: Sudbury
Party	Candidate	Votes	%	±%
Liberal Unionist	Cuthbert Quilter	Unopposed		
Liberal Unionist hold				

Heaton-Armstrong

General election 1906: Sudbury
Party	Candidate	Votes	%	±%
Liberal	William Heaton-Armstrong	4,201	50.8	New
Liberal Unionist	Cuthbert Quilter	4,065	49.2	N/A
Majority		136	1.6	N/A
Turnout		8,266	81.7	N/A
Registered electors		10,121		
Liberal gain from Liberal Unionist		Swing	N/A	

=== Elections in the 1910s ===
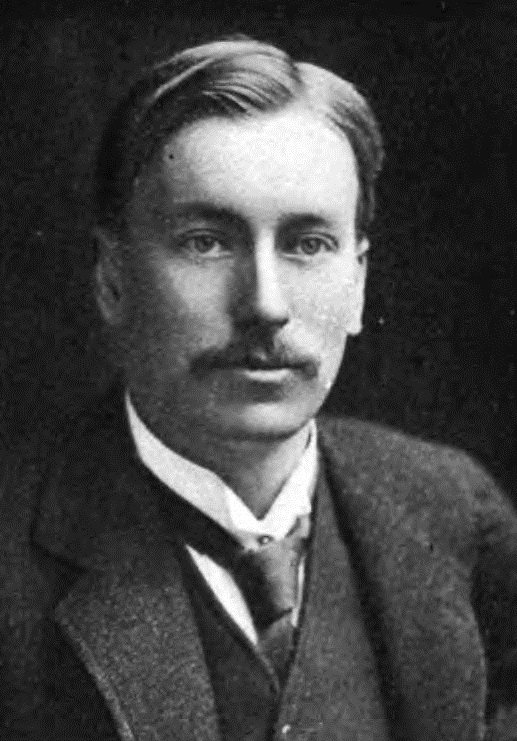
Hirst

General election January 1910: Sudbury
Party	Candidate	Votes	%	±%
Conservative	Cuthbert Quilter	5,026	55.9	+6.7
Liberal	Francis Hirst	3,958	44.1	−6.7
Majority		1,068	11.8	N/A
Turnout		8,984	89.5	+7.8
Registered electors		10,036		
Conservative gain from Liberal		Swing	+6.7	

General election December 1910: Sudbury
Party	Candidate	Votes	%	±%
Conservative	Cuthbert Quilter	Unopposed		
Conservative hold				

General Election 1914–15:

Another General Election was required to take place before the end of 1915. The political parties had been making preparations for an election to take place and by July 1914, the following candidates had been selected;

- Unionist: Cuthbert Quilter
- Liberal: Stephen Howard

Howard

General election 1918: Sudbury
Party		Candidate	Votes	%	±%
	National Liberal	Stephen Howard	6,656	52.1	New
C	Unionist	Richard George Proby	5,746	44.9	N/A
	Labour	Joseph Rouse Hicks*	390	3.0	New
Majority			910	7.2	N/A
Turnout			12,792	48.4	N/A
	National Liberal gain from Unionist		Swing	N/A	
C indicates candidate endorsed by the coalition government.

* some records describe Hicks as an 'Agriculture' candidate

=== Elections in the 1920s ===
General election 1922: Sudbury
Party	Candidate	Votes	%	±%
Unionist	Herbert Mercer	7,298	47.0	+2.1
National Liberal	Stephen Howard	5,410	34.9	−17.2
Liberal	Ernest William Tanner	2,813	18.1	New
Majority		1,888	12.1	N/A
Turnout		15,521	59.3	+10.9
Unionist gain from National Liberal		Swing		

General election 1923: Sudbury
Party	Candidate	Votes	%	±%
Liberal	Frederick Loverseed	8,813	52.0	* −1.0
Unionist	Herbert Mercer	8,148	48.0	+1.0
Majority		665	4.0	N/A
Turnout		16,961	63.8	+4.5
Liberal gain from Unionist		Swing	-1.0	

* compared to combined 1922 Liberal vote.

General election 1924: Sudbury
Party	Candidate	Votes	%	±%
Unionist	Henry Burton	10,579	53.6	+5.6
Liberal	Frederick Loverseed	9,168	46.4	−5.6
Majority		1,411	7.2	N/A
Turnout		19,747	73.3	+9.5
Unionist gain from Liberal		Swing	+5.6	

General election 1929: Sudbury
Party	Candidate	Votes	%	±%
Unionist	Henry Burton	9,715	40.2	−13.4
Liberal	Alan Sainsbury	8,309	34.4	−12.0
Labour	W. Jack Shingfield	6,147	25.4	New
Majority		1,406	5.8	−1.4
Turnout		24,171	75.9	+2.6
Unionist hold		Swing	-0.7	

=== Elections in the 1930s ===
General election 1931: Sudbury
Party	Candidate	Votes	%	±%
Conservative	Henry Burton	13,500	55.3	+15.1
Liberal	Alan Sainsbury	10,929	44.7	+10.3
Majority		2,571	10.6	+4.8
Turnout		24,429	76.7	+0.8
Conservative hold		Swing	+2.4	

General election 1935: Sudbury
Party	Candidate	Votes	%	±%
Conservative	Henry Burton	11,700	49.3	−6.0
Liberal	Alan Sainsbury	8,344	35.2	−9.5
Labour	Horace Denton	3,670	15.5	New
Majority		3,356	14.1	+3.5
Turnout		23,714	74.4	−2.3
Conservative hold		Swing	+1.7	

=== Elections in the 1940s ===
General Election 1939–40:

Another General Election was required to take place before the end of 1940. The political parties had been making preparations for an election to take place from 1939 and by the end of this year, the following candidates had been selected;

- Conservative: Henry Burton
- Liberal: Frederic Sellers
- Labour: Roland Hamilton

General election 1945: Sudbury
Party	Candidate	Votes	%	±%
Labour	Roland Hamilton	9,906	40.3	+24.8
Conservative	Henry Burton	9,659	39.2	−10.1
Liberal	Margaret Hitchcock	5,045	20.5	−14.7
Majority		247	1.1	N/A
Turnout		24,610	69.5	−4.9
Labour gain from Conservative		Swing		
