= Earl of Listowel =

Title in the peerage of Ireland

Earldom of Listowel
- Arms: Gules, two Bars Or, a Chief indented Or. Crest: A Demi-Lion couped Argent, ducally gorged Or. Supporters: On either side a Dragon wings elevated Ermine, armed and langued Gules.
- Creation date: 5 February 1822
- Created by: George IV
- Peerage: Peerage of Ireland
- First holder: William Hare, 1st Viscount Ennismore and Listowel
- Present holder: Francis Hare, 6th Earl of Listowel
- Heir presumptive: The Hon. Timothy Hare
- Subsidiary titles: Viscount Ennismore and Listowel; Baron Ennismore; Baron Hare (UK)
- Former seat: Convamore House
- Motto: ODI PROFANUM (Latin for 'I hate whatever is profane')

Earl of Listowel (pronounced "Lish-toe-ell") is a title in the Peerage of Ireland. It was created in 1822 for William Hare, 1st Viscount Ennismore and Listowel, who had earlier represented Cork City and Athy in the Irish House of Commons.

He had already been created Baron Ennismore, of Ennismore in the County of Kerry, in 1800, and Viscount Ennismore and Listowel, in 1816, also in the Peerage of Ireland. His grandson, the second Earl, represented County Kerry and St Albans in the British House of Commons. He was succeeded by his eldest son, the third Earl. In 1869 he was created Baron Hare, of Convamore in the County of Cork, in the Peerage of the United Kingdom, which gave him an automatic seat in the House of Lords. Lord Listowel later held minor office in the second administration of William Ewart Gladstone. His grandson, the fifth Earl, was a Labour politician and notably served as the last Secretary of State for India and Burma.

As of 2017 the titles are held by the latter's eldest son, the sixth Earl, who succeeded in 1997. Lord Listowel is one of the ninety elected hereditary peers that remain in the House of Lords after the passing of the House of Lords Act 1999, and sits as a cross-bencher.

Another member of the family was the Conservative politician the 1st Viscount Blakenham (1911–1982). He was the third son of the fourth Earl.

Listowel is a town in the north of County Kerry in the south-west of Ireland. The family seat was formerly Convamore House, near Ballyhooly in County Cork.

== Earl of Listowel (1822) ==
- William Hare, 1st Earl of Listowel (1751–1837)
- William Hare, 2nd Earl of Listowel (1801–1856)
- William Hare, 3rd Earl of Listowel (1833–1924)
- Richard Granville Hare, 4th Earl of Listowel (1866–1931)
- William Francis Hare, 5th Earl of Listowel (1906–1997)
- Francis Michael Hare, 6th Earl of Listowel (born 1964)

The heir presumptive is the present holder's brother, Hon. Timothy Patrick Hare (born 1966).

The next in line is the present holder's cousin Caspar John Hare, 3rd Viscount Blakenham (born 1972), a philosophy professor at the Massachusetts Institute of Technology. He has a son, the Hon. Inigo Hare.

== Line of succession ==
- William Hare, 1st Earl of Listowel (1751–1837)
  - Col. Richard Hare, Viscount Ennismore (1773–1827)
    - William Hare, 2nd Earl of Listowel (1801–1856)
      - William Hare, 3rd Earl of Listowel, 1st Baron Hare (1833–1924)
        - Richard Granville Hare, 4th Earl of Listowel (1866–1931)
          - William Francis Hare, 5th Earl of Listowel (1906–1997)
            - Francis Michael Hare, 6th Earl of Listowel (born 1964) Elected to remain in 1999.
            - (1) Hon. Timothy Patrick Hare (born 1966)
          - John Hugh Hare, 1st Viscount Blakenham (1911–1982)
            - Michael John Hare, 2nd Viscount Blakenham (1938–2018)
              - (2) Caspar John Hare, 3rd Viscount Blakenham (born 1972)
                - (3) Hon. Inigo Hare
          - Maj. Hon. Alan Victor Hare (1919–1995)
            - (4) Alan Simon Mercury Hare (born 1948)
    - Hon. Robert Hare (1808–1865)
      - Robert Dillon Hare (1842–1936)
        - Brig.Gen. Robert William Hare (1872–1953)
          - Lt Col. Robert Gerald Dillon Hare (1910–1997)
            - (5) Anthony Gerald Hare (born 1956)

== See also ==
- Viscount Blakenham
