= William Hare, 3rd Earl of Listowel =

Anglo-Irish peer and Liberal politician

The Right Honourable The Earl of Listowel KP

Lord-in-Waiting
- In office 10 May 1880 – 14 September 1880
- Prime Minister: William Ewart Gladstone
- Preceded by: The Earl of Onslow
- Succeeded by: The Earl of Dalhousie

Member of the House of Lords Lord Temporal
- In office 8 December 1869 – 5 June 1924; Hereditary Peerage
- Preceded by: peerage created as Baron Hare
- Succeeded by: The 4th Earl of Listowel

Personal details
- Born: 29 May 1833
- Died: 5 June 1924 (aged 91)
- Party: Liberal
- Spouse: Lady Ernestine Brudenell-Bruce (m. 1865)
- Children: 4, including Richard
- Parent(s): William Hare, 2nd Earl of Listowel; Maria Wyndham

William Hare, 3rd Earl of Listowel, KP, JP (29 May 1833 – 5 June 1924), styled Viscount Ennismore from 1837 to 1856, was an Irish peer and Liberal politician.

== Background ==
Listowel was the eldest son of William Hare, 2nd Earl of Listowel of Convamore House, Ballyhooly, County Cork, and Maria Augusta, widow of George Wyndham of Cromer Hall, Norfolk, and second daughter of Vice-Admiral William Lukin Windham of Felbrigg Hall. He was educated at Eton before gaining a commission as a lieutenant in the Scots Fusiliers Guards in 1852.

Listowel owned 35,000 acres, with 30,000 in County Kerry and 5,000 in County Cork.

== Military career ==
Listowel served with his regiment during the Crimean War (1854–1856). On 30 September 1854 at the Battle of Alma he was wounded and was invalided out to England by ship.

== Political career ==
In the 1855 general election he stood for the Liberal party in County Cork. He succeeded his father in the earldom in 1856 but as this was an Irish peerage it did not entitle him to a seat in the House of Lords. On 8 December 1869 he was created Baron Hare, of Convamore in the County of Cork, in the Peerage of the United Kingdom, which gave him the immediate right to sit in the House of Lords. In 1873 he was appointed Knight of the Order of St Patrick.

Lord Listowel later served as a Lord-in-waiting (government whip in the House of Lords) from May to September 1880, this was at the beginning of the second Liberal administration of William Ewart Gladstone, but was informed that the royal household was not an hereditary sinecure. However he was appointed to the largely ceremonial post of Vice-admiral of Munster.

== Family ==
Lord Listowel married Lady Ernestine Mary, younger daughter of Ernest Brudenell-Bruce, 3rd Marquess of Ailesbury, in 1865. He died in June 1924, aged 91, and was succeeded in his titles by his eldest son Richard. Two of his grandsons, William Hare, 5th Earl of Listowel, and John Hare, 1st Viscount Blakenham, both became government ministers. Lady Listowel died in 1936.

- Richard Granville Hare, 4th Earl of Listowel
- Hon. Charles Ambrose Hare (1875–1885)
- Lady Margaret Ernestine Augusta Hare (d.1951), married Reginald Loder, son of Sir Robert Loder, 1st Baronet.
- Lady Beatrice Mary Hare (d.1960), married Hon. Edward O'Brien, youngest son of 14th Baron Inchiquin

Political offices
Preceded by The Lord de Ros	Lord-in-waiting; 1880	Succeeded by The Lord Sandhurst
Peerage of Ireland
Preceded by William Hare	Earl of Listowel; 1856–1924	Succeeded by Richard Hare
Peerage of the United Kingdom
New creation	Baron Hare; 1869–1924	Succeeded by Richard Hare
