= Blakenham =

Blakenham may refer to:

== People ==
- Viscount Blakenham, peerage in the United Kingdom

== Places ==
- Great Blakenham, Suffolk, England
- Little Blakenham, Suffolk, England
