= Richard Gilbert Hare =

Connoisseur of Russian art and literature (1907–1966)

The Honourable Richard Gilbert Hare
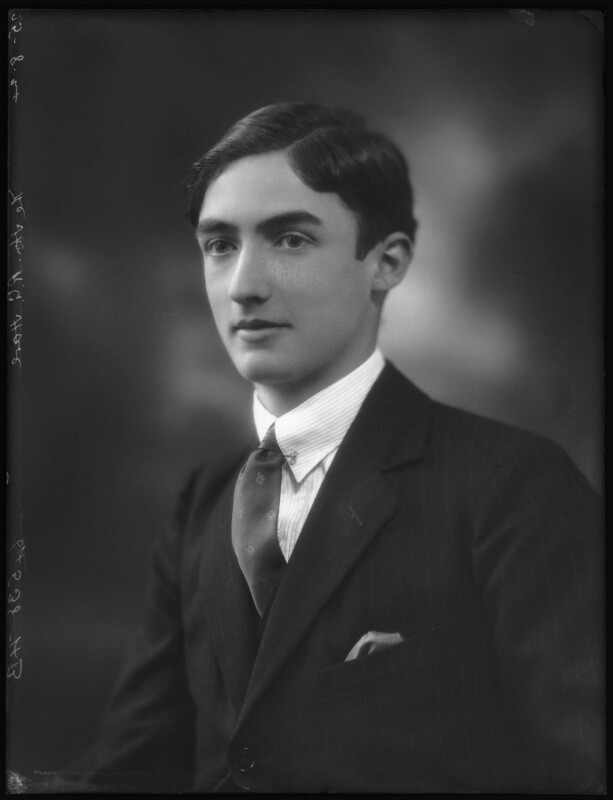
- Portrait by Alexander Bassano, 1924
- Born: Richard Gilbert Hare; 5 September 1907; London, England
- Died: 14 September 1966 (aged 59); Kingston Vale, Surrey, England
- Known for: Russian art collection The Art and Artists of Russia
- Spouse: Dora Gordine (m. 1936)

Academic background
- Education: Rugby School
- Alma mater: Balliol College, Oxford
- Influences: William Wyamar Vaughan

Academic work
- Discipline: Russian studies
- Institutions: Foreign Office; Ministry of Information; Stanford University; School of Slavonic and East European Studies

Richard Gilbert Hare (5 September 1907 – 14 September 1966) was a British diplomat who later became the first Professor of Russian Literature at London University. His interests encompassed Russian art, literature and politics which he taught at the School of Slavonic and East European Studies. In 1936 he set up a studio with the Russian sculptor and painter, Dora Gordine in Kingston upon Thames which is now the Dorich House Museum curated by Kingston University. His obituary in The Times said of him: "Though of a rather reserved nature he was charming as a companion and was always a most courteous and considerate colleague and teacher."

== Early life and education ==
Richard Gilbert Hare was born in London on 5 September 1907, the second son of Richard Hare, 4th Earl of Listowel, Viscount Ennismore, and his wife, Freda Vanden-Bempde-Johnstone (1885–1968) the youngest daughter of the 2nd Baron Derwent. Although from an Anglo-Irish aristocratic family with estates in County Cork and Devon, he was brought up in Marylebone, London. The family seat at Convamore, Ballyhooly in Cork was burned to a ruin in 1921 during the Irish War of Independence. In a family of high achievers, all his brothers had careers in public life. William Francis Hare (1906-1997), who also went to Balliol, was the last Secretary of State for India, as well as the last Governor-General of Ghana. John Hugh Hare (1911–1982) became chairman of the Conservative Party. Alan Victor Hare (1919–1995) became chairman of the Financial Times as well as a Director of The Economist and the English National Opera.

Richard, the namesake of his father, was sent as a boarder to Rugby School differentiating him from his three brothers who all went to Eton College. A shy and sensitive child who loved art, Hare was encouraged in an academic direction by its headmaster William Wyamar Vaughan. Vaughan's wife, Margaret, had been a close friend of Virginia Woolf who was a frequent visitor to the Vaughan household and through whom Hare met the younger members of the Bloomsbury Set in London in the late 1920s.

Hare went up to Balliol College, Oxford in 1925 where he studied philosophy, politics and economics obtaining a first class degree. He met Dora Gordine in 1926, who was already a successful artist based in Paris with her own self-designed studio. She cut an impossibly glamorous figure from Russia although she never revealed her origins or age. She had a commission to paint murals for the interior of the British pavilion for the Exposition Internationale des Arts Décoratifs et Industriels Modernes. In the summer of 1926, she was invited to exhibit at the Salon des Tuileries, where she achieved critical acclaim. Hare became an important early supporter of her career.

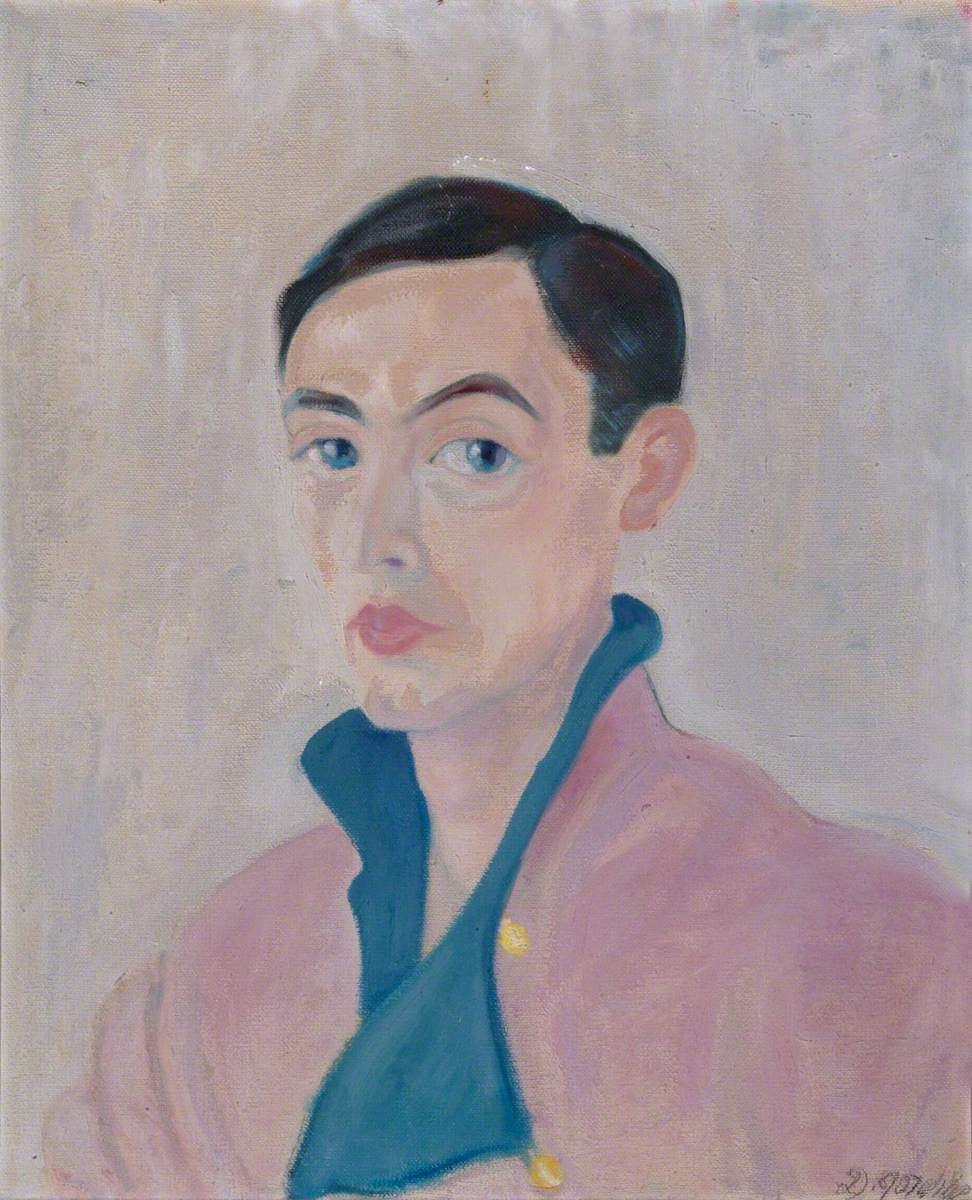
The honourable Richard Gilbert Hare

He had been introduced to Dora by Janet Vaughan (later Principal of Somerville College, Oxford), the daughter of his former headmaster. He subsequently studied at the Sorbonne and at Berlin before becoming a Laming Travelling Fellow in 1929 at Queen's College, Oxford.

Dora painted the portrait of Richard Hare as a Young Man in around 1929, the year in which they parted. Gordine left for Paris and was soon commissioned by the Singapore city authorities to decorate the Town Hall with models representing people of six different ethnic backgrounds living in the Malay Peninsula. In 1930, Dora married George H. Garlick, an art collector and physician to the Sultan of Johore, Ibrahim of Johor who was considered "fabulously wealthy".

== Early career, love and marriage ==
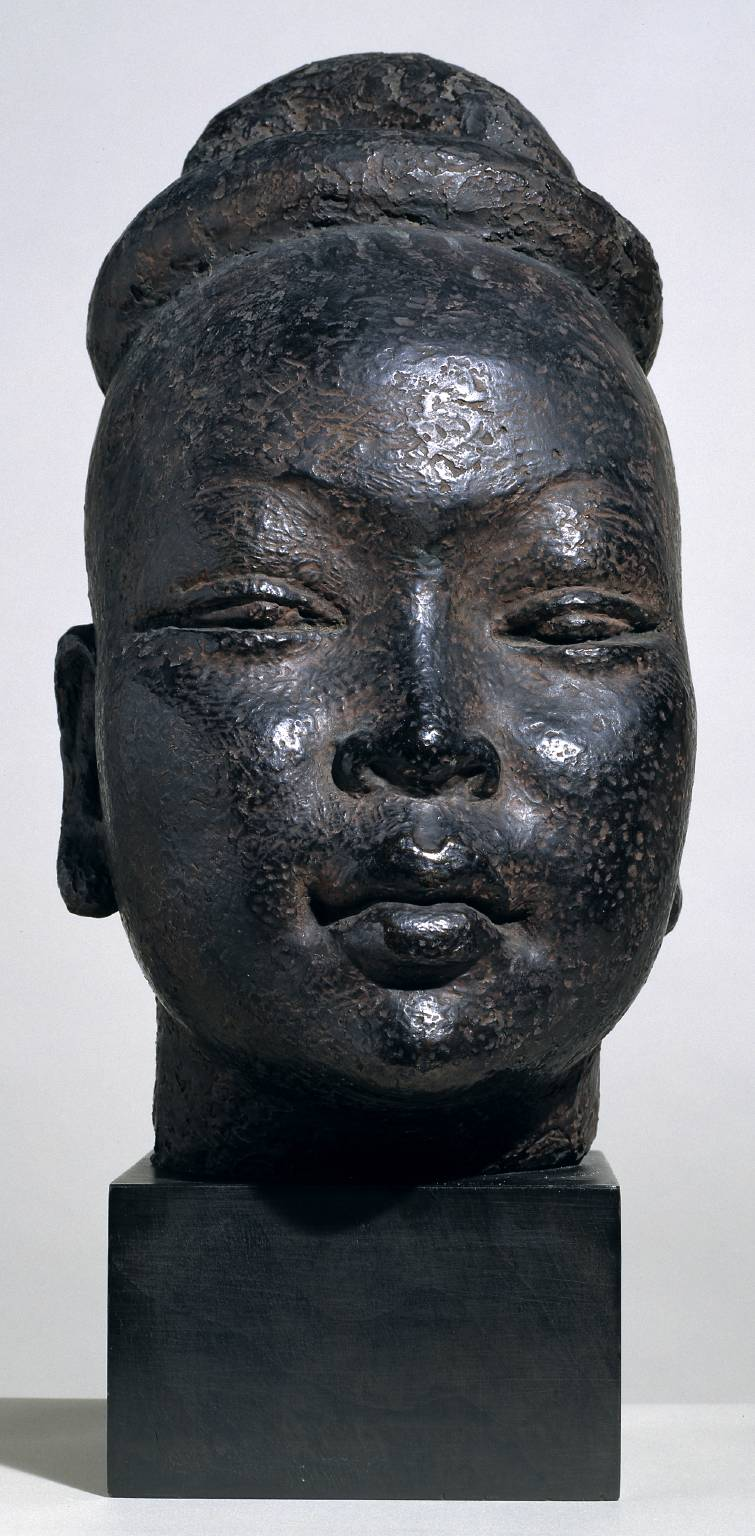
Javanese Head

Hare joined the Diplomatic Service in 1930 as Third Secretary in the Paris Embassy before working at the Foreign Office. Hare stayed in touch with Gordine, twelve years his senior. She went on a tour of the Malay Peninsular to find subjects for portraits. She modelled the sculpture Javanese Head in Singapore and had it cast in Paris in 1931.

Hare's father died in 1931 leaving him a sufficient sum to live independently. In 1933, he resigned his post at the Foreign Office and purchased a cast of Javanese Head from the Leicester Galleries. In 1934, he sailed to Southeast Asia where he visited Gordine and her husband in Malaya. Gordine's marriage failed and she returned to England. Following the annulment of her marriage, Dora and Richard married at Chelsea Registry Office in November 1936, shortly before moving into Dorich House, named after "Dora" and "Richard".

== Second World War ==
Hare's Russian was excellent which led to wartime service in the Foreign Publicity (i.e. propaganda) department of the Anglo-Soviet relations division of the Ministry of Information, becoming director of the division in 1944. His colleague Berthe Malnick later wrote that Hare was convinced that "the English public needed insight into Russia as much as Russians needed knowledge of Britain".

The creation of propaganda at the Ministry was thought to have influenced George Orwell whose wife worked in the Censorship Section whilst he worked at the BBC producing Ministry-approved broadcasts The Ministry published a booklet to counter ideological fears of Bolshevism, including claims that the Red Terror was a figment of Nazi imagination. This inspired George Orwell to leave the BBC and write Animal Farm, which was suppressed by the Ministry until the end of the war.

Around this time, Hare started collecting Imperial Russian art. In the years following the Second World War, he and Dora made regular trips to Europe to hunt for new pieces.

== Academic career ==
After the war, Hare was invited to return to the Foreign Office but he devoted himself to an academic life centred on Russian literature, art and culture. He was a Rockefeller Foundation fellow at the Hoover Institute from 1947–8 where he researched the Russian literary archives at Stanford University. The couple spent time in California in 1947/8. In the following year, he joined the School of Slavonic and East European Studies of the University of London, going on to hold a visiting Professorship at the University of Indiana in 1959, and to become holder of the first chair in Russian literature at the School of Slavonic and Eastern European Studies at the University of London in 1962. He was Professor of Slavonic Studies in 1964. Hare wrote books and articles on Russian art, literature, people and politics. His lectures on Tolstoy were notable.

== Dorich House ==
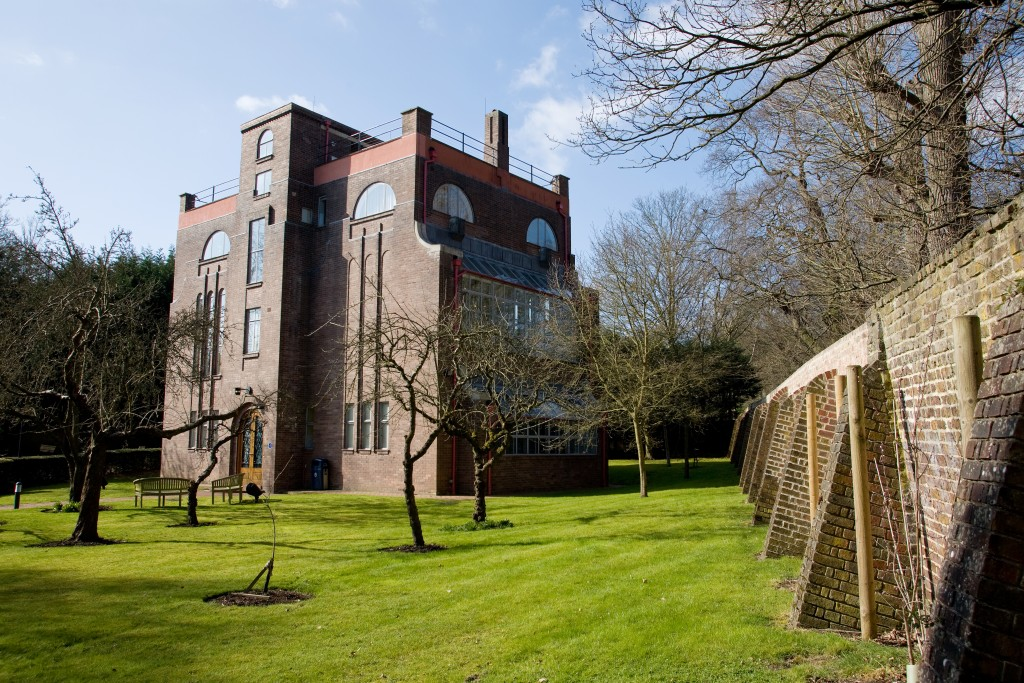
Dorich House exterior

Dorich House was designed by Gordine and its construction was funded and project-managed by Hare, without an architect. The house, on the edge of Richmond Park, is spread across three floors; the ground and first floors devoted to the production and display of Gordine's work, with the upper floor forming the couple's private apartment. Dora was a lifelong companion whose artistic energy balanced his quiet personality.

Kingston’s leafy suburbs proved an ideal location for Gordine and Hare, giving easy access to the cultural life of London and the tranquility and open outlook that Gordine favoured for her work. Dora's artistic career flourished at Dorich House. She specialised in portrait sculptures attracting international admirers from the political, social, artistic, literary and theatrical worlds. Her constant and enthusiastic support nurtured and deepened his appreciation of the arts.

Richard described his main hobby as gardening, an interest shared with his brother John. Country Life magazine explained that the setting on Kingston Vale was crucial to the conception of Dorich House:

‘In the first place, the site was a matter of infinite importance; and the one eventually found, with its lovely view over the noble trees of Richmond Park, could hardly be bettered. Having found a nearly perfect situation, the very most has been made of its advantages. From the flat roof the whole panorama of the Park and the distant tree-clad hills unfolds around one: it enables Dora Gordine to work on a figure intended for a garden ornament actually in its intended setting, under the sky…’

— M. Barron, Country Life, 5 November 1938

== Death and legacy ==
Richard died of a heart attack on 14 September 1966 at Dorich House. Gordine lived on alone until her death in 1991, having survived him by nearly 25 years. After her death, Dorich House was purchased by Kingston University which renovated it and converted it into a museum. The Dorich House Museum displays Gordine’s sculpture, painting and drawing. There are also items from Hare's Imperial Russian art collection including icons, paintings, ceramics, glassware, metalwork, folk art and furniture dating from the early 18th century to the early 20th century. His wish was that their collection should be used for the enjoyment of the British nation. Dora said that their children were the artworks.

== Publications ==
- Russian Literature from Pushkin to the Present Day, 1947 - introducing the British public to the literature of their wartime ally.
- Pioneers of Russian Social Thought, 1951
- Portraits of Russian Personalities between Reform and Revolution, 1959
- Maxim Gorky: Romantic Realist and Conservative Revolutionary, 1962
- The Art and Artists of Russia, 1965, an illustrated survey of art in Russia before the Revolution - drawing on examples from his own collection at Dorich House.
- Translations of selected novels and stories of Ivan Turgenev (1947) and Ivan Bunin (1949).

Hare was also a contributor to Encyclopædia Britannica, Collier's Encyclopedia, the Slavonic Review (where he was on the editorial board), the Russian Review, History Today, the Slavic Review, The Connoisseur and the Times Literary Supplement.
