= Francis Brinkley =

Anglo-Irish newspaper owner, editor, and scholar

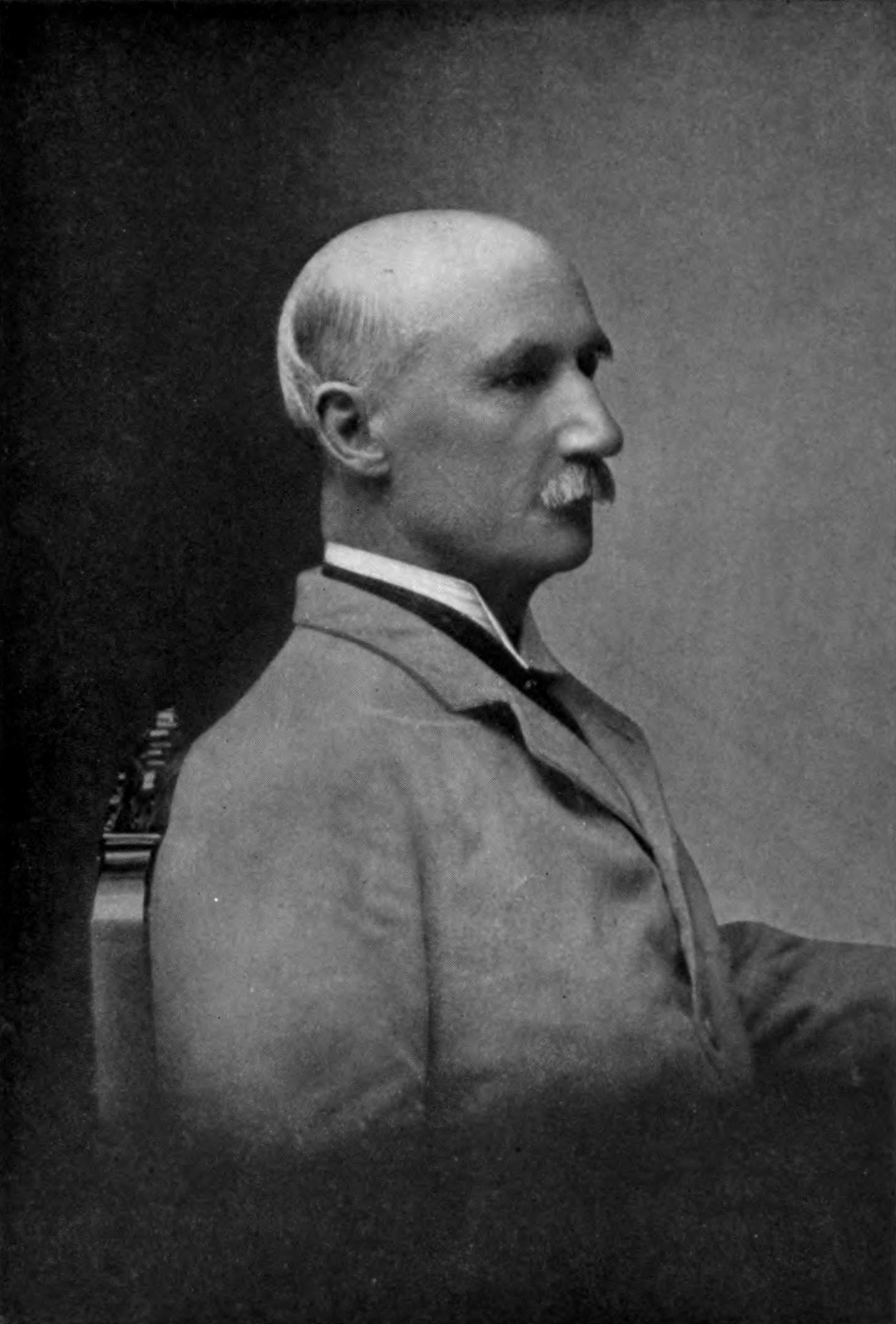
- Born: 30 December 1841; Leinster, Ireland
- Died: 12 October 1912 (aged 70); Tokyo, Japan
- Other names: Frank Brinkley; Captain Francis Brinkley
- Occupations: Military advisor, journalist

Francis Brinkley (30 December 1841 – 12 October 1912) was an Anglo-Irish newspaper owner, editor and scholar who resided in Meiji period Japan for over 40 years, where he was the author of numerous books on Japanese culture, art and architecture and an English-Japanese Dictionary. He was the great-uncle of Cyril Connolly.

== Early life ==
Frank Brinkley was born at Parsonstown House, County Meath in 1841. He was the thirteenth and youngest child of Richard Brinkley J.P., of Parsonstown and his wife Harriet Graves. John Brinkley, the last Bishop of Cloyne and the first Royal Astronomer of Ireland, was his paternal grandfather. Richard Graves, a Senior Fellow of Trinity College and the Dean of Ardagh, was his maternal grandfather. One of Brinkley's sisters, Jane (Brinkley) Vernon of Clontarf Castle, was the grandmother of Cyril Connolly. Another sister, Anna, became the Dowager Countess of Kingston after the death of her first husband, James King, 5th Earl of Kingston and was the last person to live at Mitchelstown Castle. Richard Francis Burton, a distinguished linguist who shared Brinkley's passion for foreign cultures, was related to him through the latter's maternal family.

Brinkley went to Royal School Dungannon before entering Trinity College, where he received the highest records in mathematics and classics. After graduating, he chose a military career and was subsequently accepted at the Royal Military Academy, Woolwich, becoming an artillery officer. In this capacity, his cousin, Sir Richard Graves MacDonnell the 6th Governor of Hong Kong (1866–1872), invited him out to the east to serve as his Aide-de-camp and Adjutant.

In 1866, Brinkley visited Nagasaki on his way to Hong Kong. During the visit, he witnessed a duel between two samurai warriors. The victor covered the opponent he had slain with haori, and "knelt down with hands clasped in prayer". Reportedly, Brinkley was impressed by the warriors' conduct, which enticed him to live in Japan permanently.

== Life in Japan ==
In 1867, Brinkley returned to Yokohama, Japan, never again to return home. Attached to the British-Japanese Legation and still an officer in the Royal Artillery, he was assistant military attache to the Japanese Embassy. He resigned his commission in 1871 to take up the post of foreign advisor to the new Meiji government and taught artillery techniques to the Imperial Japanese Navy at the Naval Gunnery School. He mastered the Japanese language soon after his arrival, and both spoke and wrote it well. In 1878, Brinkley was invited to teach mathematics at the Imperial College of Engineering, which later became part of Tokyo Imperial University, remaining in this post for two and a half years.

In 1878, media in Japan reported that Brinkley was married to Yasuko Tanaka, a daughter of a former samurai from the Mito clan. The Japanese government approved the marriage in March 1886. Interracial marriages could be registered under Japanese law from 1873. It was the first official English-Japanese cross-culturally married couple in Japan. The British Legation, however, rejected Brinkley's marriage due to concerns about Tanaka's nationality issue arising from the marriage. Brinkley fought the rejection and eventually succeeded by appealing to the British judiciary in February 1890. They were the parents of two sons and a daughter. One of his sons was named Jack Ronald Brinkley.

In 1881, Brinkley purchased The Japan Weekly Mail (also known as the Japan Mail). Since then and before his death, he was the newspaper's owner and editor-in-chief. Japan Mail merged with the Japan Times afterwards. The Japanese government financially supports the Japan Mail. In exchange, the newspaper aligned with the Japanese government. While the Japan Mail was the most widely read English newspaper in the Far East, many people criticised the newspaper's government support: Robert Young, owner of Japan Chronicle, described the newspaper as "paid advocacy"; while some of them even criticised the newspaper as nothing more than a "government propaganda organ".

After the First Sino-Japanese War, Brinkley succeeded Henry Spencer Palmer and became the Tokyo-based correspondent for The Times of London. He gained fame for his dispatches during the Russo-Japanese War of 1904–1905. Brinkley was awarded the Order of the Sacred Treasure by Emperor Meiji for his contributions to better Anglo-Japanese relations. He was also an adviser to the Nippon Yusen Kaisha, Japan's largest shipping line. F.A. MacKenzie, a prominent English journalist, wrote:

Captain Brinkley's great knowledge of Japanese life and language is admitted and admired by all. His independence of judgment is, however, weakened by his close official connection with the Japanese Government and by his personal interest in Japanese industry. His journal is regarded generally as a government mouth-piece, and he has succeeded in making himself a more vigorous advocate of the Japanese claims than even the Japanese themselves. It can safely be forecasted that whenever a dispute arises between Japanese and British interests, Captain Brinkley and his journal will play the part, through thick and thin, of defenders of the Japanese.

Brinkley's last dispatch to The Times was written from his deathbed in 1912, reporting on a seppuku: Emperor Meiji had recently died and to show fealty to the deceased emperor, General Nogi Maresuke together with his wife committed hara-kiri.

== Private life ==
Frank Brinkley had many hobbies, which included gardening, collecting Japanese art and pottery, cricket, tennis, horse riding and hunting. Part of his significant collection of art and pottery was donated to various museums around the world, but most of it was reduced to rubble and ash after the Great Tokyo earthquake and World War II.

He wrote books for English beginners interested in the Japanese language, and his grammar books and English-Japanese Dictionary (compiled with Fumio Nanjo and Yukichika Iwasaki) were regarded as the definitive books on the subject for those studying English in the latter half of the Meiji period.

He wrote much on Japanese history and Japanese art. His book A History of Japanese People: from the Earliest Times to the End of the Meiji Era, which was published after his death by The Times in 1915, covered Japanese history, fine arts and literature from the origins of the Japanese race up until the latter half of the Meiji period.

== Death ==
In 1912, at the age of 71 and one month after General Nogi's death, Francis Brinkley died. At his funeral, the mourners included the Speaker of the House of Peers, Tokugawa Iesato, the Minister of the Navy Saitō Makoto, and the Foreign Minister Uchida Kosai. He is buried in the foreign section of the Aoyama Reien cemetery in central Tokyo.

After his death Ernest Satow wrote of Brinkley to Frederick Victor Dickins on 21 November 1912: "I have not seen any fuller memoir of Brinkley than what appeared in "The Times". As you perhaps know I did not trust him. Who wrote "The Times" notice I cannot imagine. As you say, it was the work of an ignorant person."

Before his death, Frank Brinkley had told his son, Jack, of an episode that occurred during the Russo-Japanese War. After the Japanese had defeated the Russians at the Battle of Mukden, the Chief of the General Staff, Kodama Gentarō, rushed home in secret to urge the Japanese Government to conclude a treaty with Russia. At the time it was a hugely consequential secret and yet he confided this national secret to Brinkley, the foreign correspondent of The Times, demonstrating the utmost confidence in which the Chief of the General Staff held Brinkley.

== Publications ==
- 《英国銃隊練法 : 1870年式》 By Frank Brinkley. 服部本之助, 玉置正造. 津: 整暇堂, 1872
- 《語学独案内》 By Frank Brinkley.
  - Tokyo: 日就社, 1876
  - With 門野久太郎. Tokyo: 文学社, 1887-11
  - Tokyo: 岩森錠太郎等. 1888
  - Tokyo: 集山堂, 1896.4
- The Kyoto Industrial Exhibition of 1895: held in celebration of the eleven hundredth anniversary of the city's existence By Frank Brinkley. Kyoto: The Kyoto City Government, 1895
- 《和英大辞典》 By Frank Brinkley. Tokyo: 三省堂, 1897.10
- Japan: described and illustrated by the Japanese By Frank Brinkley. Boston: J. B. Millet Company, 1897-1898.
  - Translated by 岡倉覚三. London: The Folio Society, 2012.
- Japan, its history, arts and literature By Frank Brinkley. Tokyo: J.B. Millet, 1901-1902
- Oriental series: Japan and China / by F. Brinkley. By Frank Brinkley. Boston: J. B. Millet, 1901-1902.
- The art of Japan / by Captain F. Brinkley. By Frank Brinkley. Boston: J. B. Millet, 1901.
- China; its history, arts and literature, by Captain F. Brinkley. By Frank Brinkley. Boston: J. B. Millet, 1902
- An unabridged Japanese-English dictionary By Frank Brinkley, 南条文雄, 岩崎行親, 1855-1928 Tokyo: Sanseidō, 1907.7
- 《新語学独案内》 By Frank Brinkley. Tokyo: 三省堂, 1910.6
- The world's English readers By Brinkley, Frank, 斎藤 秀三郎, 1866-1929 Tokyo: Nichi-Eisha, 1911
- A history of the Japanese people: from the earliest times to the end of the Meiji era / by Capt. F. Brinkley, with the collaboration of Baron Kikuchi. By Frank Brinkley. 菊池大麓. New York: The Encyclopædia Britannica Co., 1914-1915
- Brinkley's Japanese-English dictionary By Frank Brinkley. Cambridge: W.Heffer and sons, 1963

== See also ==
- Jinzō Matsumura

== Sources ==
- Ito, Chiharu (1 July 2024). "Francis Brinkley and the Two Wars: 1894-1905" (PDF). 津田塾大学言語文化研究所報. 39. Tsuda University.
- James, Hoare (1999). Britain & Japan: biographical portraits. Richmond: Japan library. ISBN 978-1-873410-89-9.
- Johnson, Dan (May 2015). "Exporting Exoticism: Captain Brinkley's Japan Described and IllustratedIllustrated". Bridgewater Review. 34 (1).
- Mustatea, Alexandra (2023). "The Portrait of a Forgotten Meiji - Period Japanologist: Captain Francis Brinkley (1841-1912)" (PDF). 神田外語大学日本研究所紀要. 15. Kanda University of International Studies.
- Nagamori, Kiyoshi (1 March 2020). "Francis Brinkley: A Japanophile Englishman in Meiji Era" (PDF). 東京都立産業技術高等専門学校研究紀要. 14. Tokyo Metropolitan College of Industrial Technology.
- Satow, Ernest Mason; Ruxton, Ian C. (2008). Sir Ernest Satow's private letters to W.G. Aston and F.V. Dickins: the correspondence of a pioneer Japanologist from 1870 to 1918. Morrisville, N.C: Lulu Press. ISBN 978-1435710009.
- Sawaki, Chieko (1 February 2017). "日本語新聞の死亡記事にみるF・ブリンクリーの業績と評価" [The Evaluation and Achievements of Francis Brinkley by Viewing the Obituaries of Japanese Newspapers] (PDF). 教養デザイン研究論集 [Studies in humanities] (in Japanese). 11. 明治大学大学院教養デザイン研究科.
- (Unknown) (1914). Who's who 1914 (1 ed.). London: Adam & Charles Black.
