= Little Blakenham Pit =

Protected area in Suffolk, England

Coordinates: 52.1°N 1.076°E

- Site of Special Scientific Interest
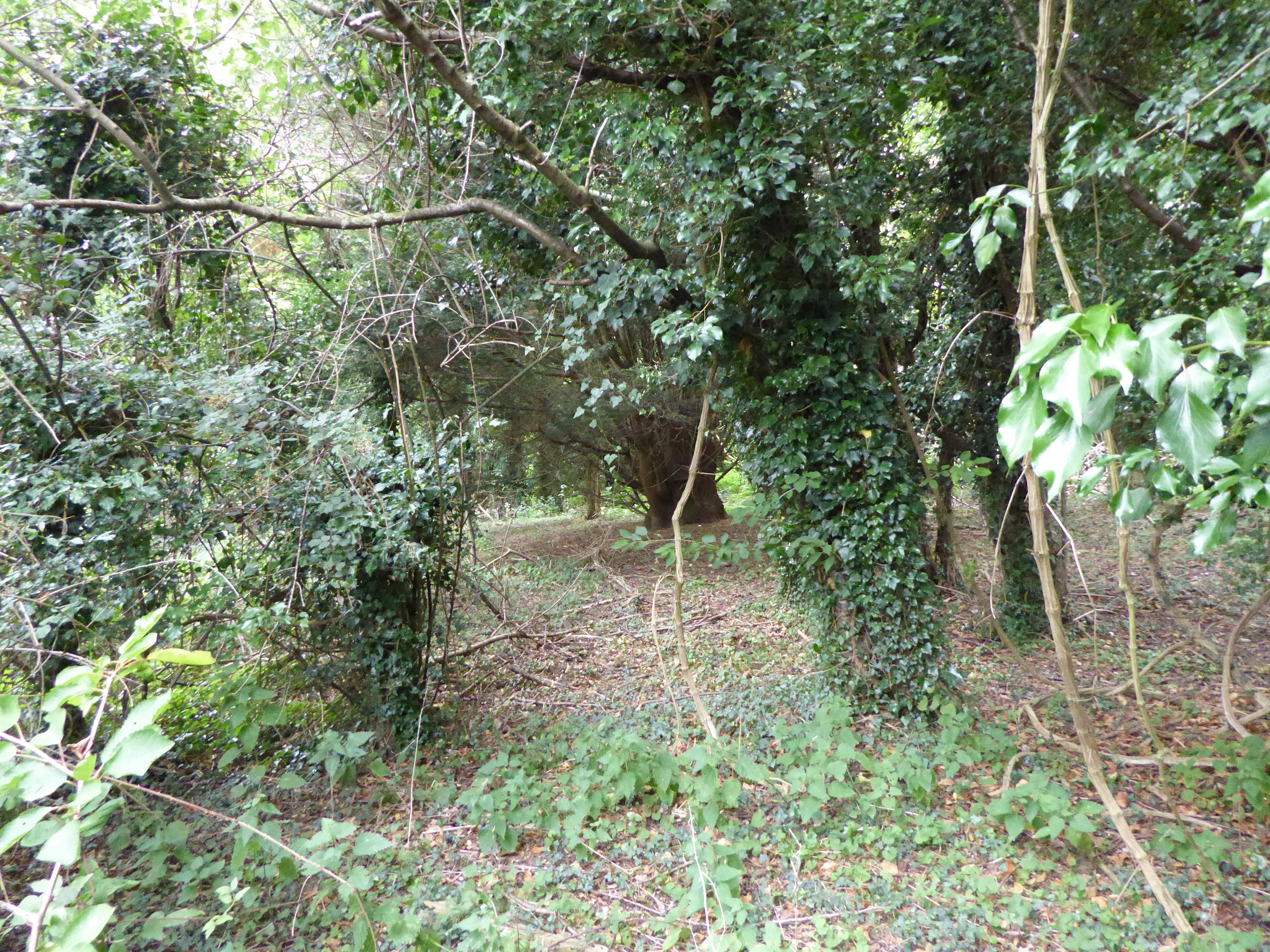
- Location of Little Blakenham Pit.
- Area of search: Suffolk
- Grid reference: TM 108 491
- Interest: Biological
- Area: 3.4 hectares
- Notification date: 1987
- Location map: Magic Map

Little Blakenham Pit is a 3.4-hectare (8.4-acre) biological Site of Special Scientific Interest in Little Blakenham in Suffolk.

A 127 metre long tunnel from one of these chalk pits is used by hibernating bats, and it is one of the largest underground roosts known in Britain. Around 450 bats use the tunnel, mainly Daubenton's. Bats also share a lime kiln with a badger sett. The site also has chalk grassland.

The site is private land with no public access.
