= Judith Hare, Countess of Listowel =

Hungarian journalist and writer (1903–2003)

Judith, Countess of Listowel
- Born: Judith de Márffy-Mantuano; 12 July 1903, Kaposvár, Hungary
- Died: 15 July 2003 (aged 100)
- Spouse: William Hare, 5th Earl of Listowel (m. 1933; div. 1945)
- Issue: Lady Deirdre Hare

Judith, Countess of Listowel (12 July 1903 – 15 July 2003) was a Hungarian-born journalist and anti-Communist writer who was married to William Hare, 5th Earl of Listowel from 1933 to 1945.

== Biography ==
She was born Judit Márffy-Mantuano de Versegh et Leno on the family estate in Kaposvár, Hungary, on 12 July 1903. She was the daughter of Rodolfo Mantuano (1869–1940), an economic adviser in the Italian Ministry of Foreign Affairs, who acquired the title and estates of the Hungarian Márffy family in 1902 and was later known as Rezső (Raoul) de Márffy-Mantuano; and the sister of Tamás Márffy. In 1926, she won a scholarship to study economic history at the London School of Economics (graduating in 1929), where she met "Billy" Hare, a lieutenant in the Intelligence Corps, from 1931 the 5th Earl of Listowel and a Labour Party peer, whom she married in Budapest in 1933. The couple were ill-fitted due to differences in worldview: she was a conservative Catholic, while his convictions were socialist and atheist. They separated in 1938 and the Countess never re-married. She is said to have benefitted from her husband's political network.

In the 1920s, she wrote a volume of short stories about Hungarian society. After her graduation in 1929, she worked as a journalist in England for the Hungarian newspapers Nemzeti Újság and Pester Lloyd until 1940. In 1932, she interviewed Hitler's early American patron and a Nazi Party chief, Ernst Hanfstaengl, on economic matters, before he fell from favour in 1933. In 1934, she returned to Germany with her husband and attempted to investigate the Nazi concentration camps, which resulted in their names being put on the Sonderfahndungsliste G.B..

After World War II was declared, Lady Listowel urged both Galeazzo Ciano, Benito Mussolini's son-in-law, and her own brother's in-law, the Hungarian prime minister Pál Teleki, not to side with Adolf Hitler. From 1939 to 1941, she was a lecturer for the British Ministry of Information and Ministry of Defence, and from 1942 to 1944 a civilian lecturer in the British Armed Forces. On 19 December 1940, she addressed the Royal Institute of International Affairs at Chatham House with a talk entitled Why Hungary Had to Do It.

She and her husband, then Under-Secretary of State for India, divorced in 1945, the year he was appointed Postmaster General of the United Kingdom in the Labour government of Clement Attlee. They had one daughter, Deirdre, later Baroness Grantley (born 1935).

From October 1944 to September 1954, she published the weekly news bulletin East Europe as a joint effort with the two wartime commanders of the Second Department of Polish General Staff (military intelligence and counterintelligence) in exile, Jan Kowalewski and Jerzy Niezbrzycki. It appeared as East Europe. Bulletin of Seven East European Countries (S.E.E.C. Bulletin) between 1944–50, as East Europe and Soviet Russia between 1950–53, and as Soviet Orbit during 1954. In total, 493 issues of the title were produced over the ten years of existence. Due to the bulletin's anti-Soviet and anti-Communist propaganda, she was banned from entering Hungary until 1964. She travelled to Austria and crossed the border illegally on 4 November 1956 to cover the events of the Hungarian uprising, but returned after a few days and eventually produced her report by interviewing refugees.

By the late 1940s, she was part of C. A. Smith's anti-Communist network of aristocrats and industrialists which, along with the Association of Catholic Trade Unionists and former members of the Freedom and Democracy Trust, helped launch the British chapter of Natalie Paine's American anti-Communist action group Common Cause in November 1951. She also worked with the Foreign Office's secret anti-Communist propaganda arm, the Information Research Department, where her contact person in December 1951 was Mollie Hamilton.

By the 1960s, she took an active interest in the decolonisation process within the British-ruled territories in Africa, which is said to have stemmed from her ex-husband's involvement in colonial governance. The publication of her first book on the subject, The Making of Tanganyika (1965), written on request as a semi-official history of the country, coincided with the shift to one-party state in Tanzania under President Julius Nyerere in 1965, and with the white government of Rhodesia's Unilateral Declaration of Independence also in 1965. Listowel followed the activities of Oscar Kambona as the emergent leader of the opposition to Nyerere and the TANU Party in Tanzania dating to 1968–71. She travelled to Rhodesia and held conversations with oppositionists Bishop Abel Muzorewa, the founder of the African National Council (1971), and Pat Bashford, the founder of the Centre Party between 1974–75. Her papers preserved at the Borthwick Institute for Archives include material on the Pearce Commission of 1971, the Rhodesian Constitution, and the Catholic Church in Rhodesia. In 1973, she produced an Irish University Press-commissioned book on the rise of Idi Amin to power in Uganda and lost the resulting lawsuit for defamation to Milton Obote.

She was a regular contributor to The Listener, The Tablet, and The Statist.

During the 1980s, her interests shifted to the disintegration of the Eastern Bloc and she made several visits to Poland. She returned to Hungary after 1990 and received compensation from the state.

She died 3 days after her 100th birthday in July 2003, possibly in England.

== Works ==
- This I Have Seen (1943; second edition 1945) – an account of her travels with her husband
- Crusader in the Secret War (1952) – on the activities of the Polish intelligence officer Jan Kowalewski during World War II
- The Golden Tree: The Story of Peter, Tomi, and Their Family Typifies the Enduring Spirit of Hungary (1958)
- Manual of Modern Manners: A Practical Up-to-date Guide for All Occasions (1959)
- The Modern Hostess: Entertaining with Ease and Economy on All Occasions (1961)
- The Making of Tanganyika (1965; second edition 1968)
- Dusk on the Danube (1969)
- “Kenya Today” (1969) – a 12-page article in Progress: the Unilever quarterly, vol. 2, with a preface by Jomo Kenyatta)
- Amin (1973)
- The Other Livingstone (1974)
- A Habsburg Tragedy: Crown Prince Rudolf (1978)

== Bibliography ==
- Barta, Róbert (2021), A magyarság vonzásában. Válogatás Carlile Aylmer Macartney írásaiból és beszédeiből (PDF), Debrecen: Debreceni Egyetem Történelmi Intézete
- Biernaczky, Szilárd (2009), "Listowel Judit (1903–2003)", in Biernaczky, Szilárd; Búr, Gábor (eds.), Afrikakutatás. Az ELTE Afrikai Kutatási és Kiadási Program évkönyve 2005–2008 (PDF), Budapest: Mundus, pp. 22–24
- Jackowska, Anna Maria (2014), "Polacy z emigracji i z kraju w propagandowej "zimnej wojnie" (proces Wiktora Krawczenki i tzw. sprawa "międzynarodówki zdrajców")" (PDF), Polska 1944/45–1989. Studia i Materiały, 12: 33
- Wilford, Hugh (2003), The CIA, the British Left and the Cold War: Calling the Tune?, London: Frank Cass, ISBN 9780714683560
