= Frederick Ernest James =

British politician and businessman (1891-1971)

Sir Frederick Ernest James OBE (10 September 1891 – 18 January 1971) was a British colonial administrator, businessman and Liberal Party politician.

== Background ==
James was born in Nottingham, Nottinghamshire, the son of Rev. George Howard James of Letchworth, and his wife, Agnes Mary Blomfield. In 1919, he married Eleanor May Thackrah CBE. They had no children. He was awarded the Chevalier of the Order of Léopold I and the OBE in 1919 and was knighted in 1941.

== Career ==
James served in the European War from 1914–18. He was General Secretary of the YMCA in Calcutta India from 1920–28. He was a member of the Bengal Legislative Council from 1924–28. From 1928–41 he was political adviser to British interests in South India. He was a member of the All India Legislative Assembly from 1932–45. He was Liberal candidate for the new Sudbury & Woodbridge division of Suffolk at the 1950 General Election and came third;

General Election 1950: Sudbury and Woodbridge
Party	Candidate	Votes	%	±%
Conservative	Hon. John Hugh Hare	23,599	48.3	N/A
Labour	Roland Hamilton	19,062	39.0	N/A
Liberal	Sir Frederick Ernest James	6,219	12.7	N/A
Majority		4,537	9.3	N/A
Turnout			84.5	N/A
Conservative win				

He did not stand for parliament again.
