= Claydon F.C. =

Association football club in England

- Full name: Claydon Football Club
- Nickname(s): The Blues
- Founded: 1954; 71 years ago
- Ground: The Blue Circle, Great Blakenham
- Chairman: Tim Carr
- Manager: Ethan Wade
- League: Suffolk and Ipswich Football League
- 2021/22: Suffolk and Ipswich Football League, 2nd of 16
- Website: https://claydon-fc.co.uk/

Claydon F.C. is an English football club based in Great Blakenham, Suffolk. They play at the Blue Circle.
