= Edward King, Viscount Kingsborough =

Irish antiquarian (1795–1837)

Member of Parliament for County Cork
- In office 1818–1826 Serving with Richard Hare, Viscount Ennismore
- Preceded by: Richard Hare, Viscount Ennismore; James Bernard, Viscount Bernard
- Succeeded by: Richard Hare, Viscount Ennismore; Hon. Robert King

Personal details
- Born: 16 November 1795
- Died: 27 February 1837 (aged 41)
- Education: George King, 3rd Earl of Kingston (father); Lady Helena Moore (mother)

Edward King, Viscount Kingsborough (16 November 1795 – 27 February 1837) was an Irish antiquarian who sought to prove that the indigenous peoples of the Americas were a Lost Tribe of Israel. His principal contribution was in making available facsimiles of ancient documents and some of the earliest explorers' reports on pre-Columbian ruins and Maya civilisation.

He was the eldest son of George King, 3rd Earl of Kingston, Lord Kingsborough, the latter a Tory, of Mitchelstown Castle, County Cork. He represented County Cork in parliament between 1818 and 1826 as a Whig.

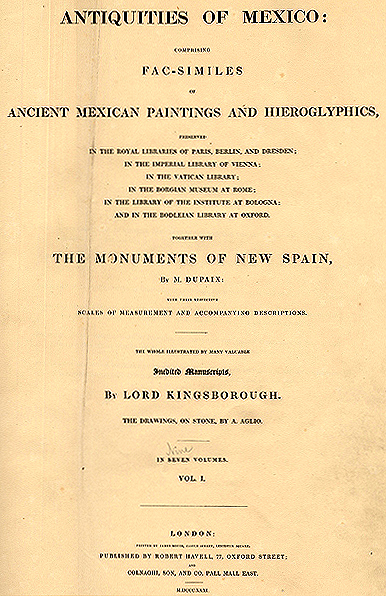
The title page of Antiquities of Mexico, volume 1

In 1831, Lord Kingsborough published the first volume of Antiquities of Mexico, a collection of copies of various Mesoamerican codices, including the first complete publication of the Dresden Codex. The exorbitant cost of the reproductions, which were often hand-painted, landed him in debtors' prison. These lavish publications represented some of the earliest published documentation of the ancient cultures of Mesoamerica, inspiring further exploration and research by John Lloyd Stephens and Charles Étienne Brasseur de Bourbourg in the early 19th century. They were the product of early theories about non-indigenous origins for Native American civilisations that are also represented in the Book of Mormon (1830) and myths about mound builders of Old World ancestry in North America.

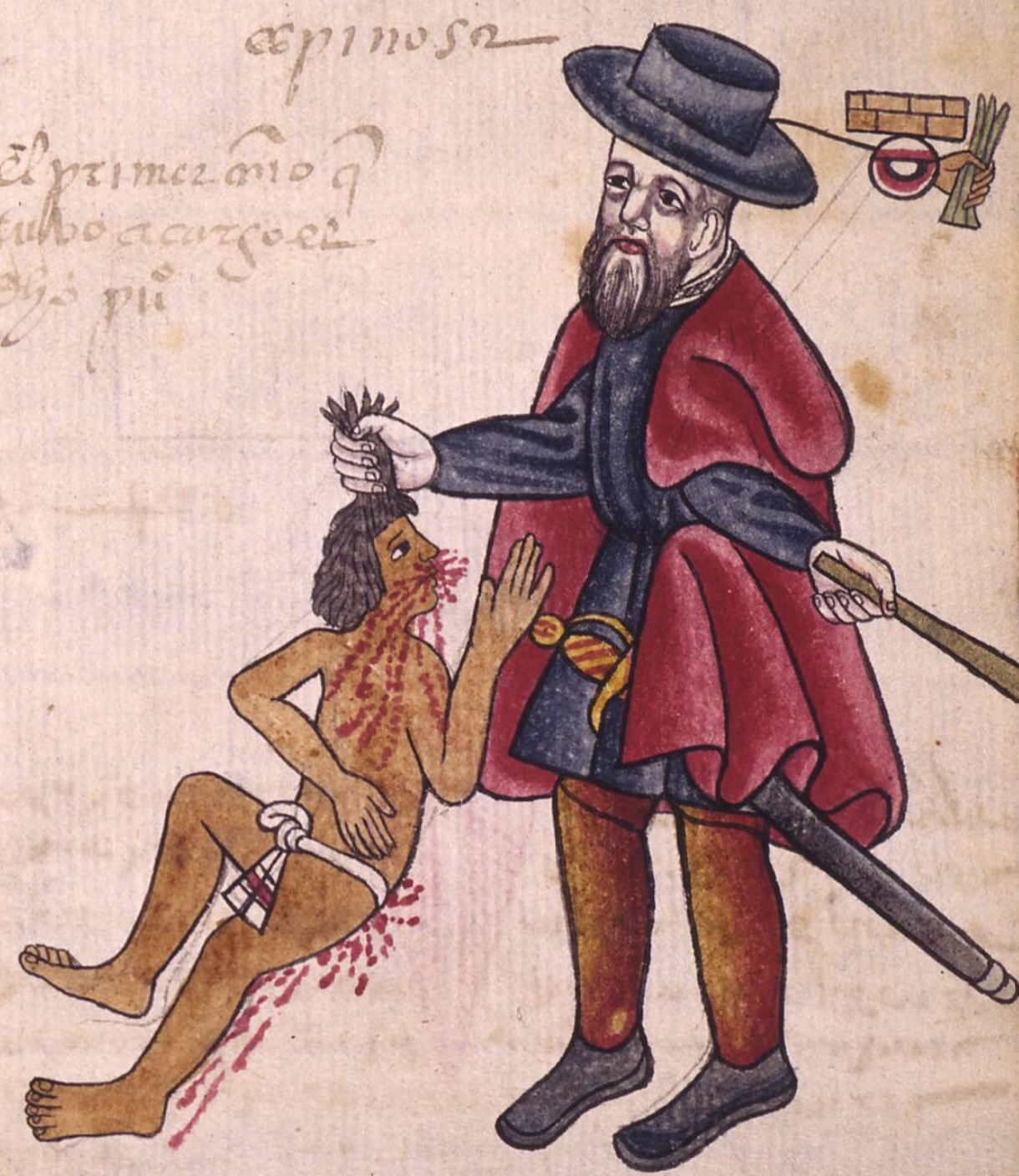
Codex Kingsborough

In 1837, Lord Kingsborough was imprisoned at the Sheriff's Prison in Dublin because he was unable to pay a small debt owed to a printer. He contracted typhus while in prison following which he was released and died three weeks later on 27 February 1837, aged 41, less than two years before he would have succeeded to his title and estates, his father having been declared insane in 1830. The last two volumes of Antiquities of Mexico were published posthumously.

The Codex Kingsborough is named after him.

== Works ==
- Kingsborough, Edward King (1831–1848). Antiquities of Mexico (9 vol.). London: Robert Havell and Colnaghi, Son, and Co. OCLC 5852094.

Parliament of the United Kingdom
| Preceded by Viscount Bernard; Viscount Ennismore | Member of Parliament for County Cork; 1818–1826; With: Viscount Ennismore | Succeeded by Viscount Ennismore; Hon. Robert King |
