= Keith Stainton =

British politician (1921–2001)

Keith Monin Stainton (8 November 1921 – 3 November 2001) was a British Conservative politician and decorated World War II veteran.

== Life and career ==
Stainton was born in Kendal, Westmorland on 8 November 1921, the son of a Kendal butcher father and a Belgian refugee mother who met during the First World War. He left school at 14 and worked as an insurance clerk from 1936 until military service.

In early 1940 he volunteered for the Navy and was commissioned into the Royal Naval Volunteer Reserve, into submarines and served on the famous French submarine Casabianca. Part French himself, he was awarded the Légion d'honneur, the Croix de Guerre avec Palme and a citation à l'ordre de L'Armée for his spy landings and torpedo actions in the Mediterranean.

After the war he read economics at Manchester University where he was founder chairman of the Manchester University Conservative Association. From 1949 to 1952, he was a leader writer for the Financial Times. He was also a founder member of the Bow Group and first chairman of Croydon East Conservative Association.

After working as a management consultant, he joined a major food manufacturing and distribution company and became managing director and chairman. He was a Lloyd's underwriter specialising in maritime and aviation reinsurance.

Stainton was Member of Parliament for Sudbury and Woodbridge from a 1963 by-election until the 1983 general election, when the seat was abolished by boundary changes; he failed to win selection in either of its successor seats, South Suffolk and Suffolk Coastal. Edward Heath made him opposition spokesman on aviation in 1965.

=== Family ===
Stainton married twice, and had six children by his first wife Vanessa Ann Heald (marriage dissolved). She was the daughter of the famous horsewoman Clare Heald, and the niece of Sir Lionel Heald.

He married Frances Easton in 1980.

== Sources ==
- Times Guide to the House of Commons 1966
- Times Guide to the House of Commons 1979
- Leigh Rayment's Historical List of MPs
- Obituary, The Independent, November 2001 (written by Tam Dalyell)
- Obituary, The Times, November 2001
- General Register Office birth/marriage/death entries

Parliament of the United Kingdom
Preceded by John Hare	Member of Parliament for Sudbury and Woodbridge; 1963–1983	Constituency abolished
