= Sudbury and Woodbridge =

Parliamentary constituency in the United Kingdom, 1950–1983

- Former county constituency for the House of Commons
- County: Suffolk
- Major settlements: Sudbury and Woodbridge

1950–1983
- Seats: One
- Created from: Woodbridge and Sudbury
- Replaced by: Suffolk Coastal and South Suffolk

Sudbury and Woodbridge was a county constituency centred on the towns of Sudbury and Woodbridge in Suffolk. It returned one Member of Parliament (MP) to the House of Commons of the Parliament of the United Kingdom.

== History ==
The constituency was created by the Representation of the People Act 1948 for the 1950 general election, replacing the majority of both of the abolished county divisions of Sudbury and Woodbridge. It included the towns of Sudbury and Hadleigh, previously in the Sudbury constituency, and Woodbridge and Felixstowe, previously in the Woodbridge constituency.

It was abolished for the 1983 general election, and split between the new county constituencies of Suffolk Coastal (Woodbridge and Felixstowe) and South Suffolk (Sudbury and Hadleigh).

== Boundaries ==
- The Borough of Sudbury;
- The Urban Districts of Felixstowe, Hadleigh, and Woodbridge;
- The Rural Districts of Cosford, Melford, and Samford; and
- Part of the Rural District of Deben.

== Members of Parliament ==
| Election | Member | Party | Notes |
|---|---|---|---|
| 1950 | John Hare | Conservative | Raised to the peerage November 1963 |
| 1963 by-election | Keith Stainton | Conservative | |
| 1983 | constituency abolished | | |

== Elections ==
=== Elections in the 1950s ===
General election 1950: Sudbury and Woodbridge
| Party | Candidate | Votes | % | ±% |
|---|---|---|---|---|
| Conservative | John Hare | 23,599 | 48.3 | |
| Labour | Roland Hamilton | 19,062 | 39.0 | |
| Liberal | Frederick James | 6,219 | 12.7 | |
| Majority | | 4,537 | 9.3 | |
| Turnout | | 48,880 | 84.5 | |
| Conservative win (new seat) | | | | |

General election 1951: Sudbury and Woodbridge
| Party | Candidate | Votes | % | ±% |
|---|---|---|---|---|
| Conservative | John Hare | 27,262 | 56.1 | +7.8 |
| Labour Co-op | Dick Lewis | 21,310 | 43.9 | +4.9 |
| Majority | | 5,952 | 12.2 | +2.9 |
| Turnout | | 48,572 | 82.1 | −2.4 |
| Conservative hold | | Swing | | |

General election 1955: Sudbury and Woodbridge
| Party | Candidate | Votes | % | ±% |
|---|---|---|---|---|
| Conservative | John Hare | 25,185 | 53.7 | −2.4 |
| Labour Co-op | Dick Lewis | 17,995 | 38.3 | −5.6 |
| Liberal | Agnes H Scott | 3,760 | 8.0 | New |
| Majority | | 7,190 | 15.4 | +3.2 |
| Turnout | | 46,940 | 79.7 | −2.4 |
| Conservative hold | | Swing | | |

General election 1959: Sudbury and Woodbridge
| Party | Candidate | Votes | % | ±% |
|---|---|---|---|---|
| Conservative | John Hare | 26,130 | 53.0 | −0.7 |
| Labour | Robert B. Stirling | 16,248 | 33.0 | −5.3 |
| Liberal | Aubrey Herbert | 6,914 | 14.0 | +6.0 |
| Majority | | 9,882 | 20.0 | +4.6 |
| Turnout | | 49,292 | 81.1 | +1.4 |
| Conservative hold | | Swing | | |

=== Elections in the 1960s ===
1963 Sudbury and Woodbridge by-election
| Party | Candidate | Votes | % | ±% |
|---|---|---|---|---|
| Conservative | Keith Stainton | 22,005 | 49.6 | −3.4 |
| Labour | Frank E Woodbridge | 16,416 | 37.0 | +4.0 |
| Liberal | Aubrey Herbert | 5,935 | 13.4 | −0.6 |
| Majority | | 5,589 | 12.6 | −7.4 |
| Turnout | | 44,356 | 70.5 | −10.6 |
| Conservative hold | | Swing | | |

General election 1964: Sudbury and Woodbridge
| Party | Candidate | Votes | % | ±% |
|---|---|---|---|---|
| Conservative | Keith Stainton | 26,370 | 50.5 | −2.5 |
| Labour | Frank E Woodbridge | 17,778 | 34.1 | +1.1 |
| Liberal | Edwin Michael Wheeler | 8,044 | 15.4 | +1.4 |
| Majority | | 8,592 | 16.4 | −3.6 |
| Turnout | | 52,192 | | |
| Conservative hold | | Swing | | |

General election 1966: Sudbury and Woodbridge
| Party | Candidate | Votes | % | ±% |
|---|---|---|---|---|
| Conservative | Keith Stainton | 26,689 | 50.2 | −0.3 |
| Labour | Max Madden | 19,680 | 37.0 | +2.9 |
| Liberal | Edwin Michael Wheeler | 6,839 | 12.9 | −2.5 |
| Majority | | 7,009 | 13.2 | −2.2 |
| Turnout | | 53,208 | 80.2 | |
| Conservative hold | | Swing | | |

=== Elections in the 1970s ===
General election 1970: Sudbury and Woodbridge
| Party | Candidate | Votes | % | ±% |
|---|---|---|---|---|
| Conservative | Keith Stainton | 32,393 | 54.6 | +4.4 |
| Labour | Brian Orriss | 19,829 | 33.4 | −3.6 |
| Liberal | Edward Michael Wheeler | 7,136 | 12.0 | −0.9 |
| Majority | | 12,564 | 21.2 | +8.0 |
| Turnout | | 59,358 | 75.9 | −4.3 |
| Conservative hold | | Swing | | |

General election February 1974: Sudbury and Woodbridge
| Party | Candidate | Votes | % | ±% |
|---|---|---|---|---|
| Conservative | Keith Stainton | 31,987 | 46.7 | −7.9 |
| Liberal | Neville S Lewis | 18,286 | 26.7 | +14.7 |
| Labour | Brian Orriss | 18,228 | 26.6 | −6.8 |
| Majority | | 13,701 | 20.0 | −1.2 |
| Turnout | | 68,501 | 81.9 | +6.0 |
| Conservative hold | | Swing | | |

General election October 1974: Sudbury and Woodbridge
| Party | Candidate | Votes | % | ±% |
|---|---|---|---|---|
| Conservative | Keith Stainton | 30,049 | 47.5 | +0.8 |
| Labour | RE Russel | 17,986 | 28.4 | +1.8 |
| Liberal | Neville S Lewis | 15,206 | 24.0 | −2.7 |
| Majority | | 12,063 | 19.1 | −0.9 |
| Turnout | | 63,241 | 75.0 | −5.1 |
| Conservative hold | | Swing | | |

General election 1979: Sudbury and Woodbridge
| Party | Candidate | Votes | % | ±% |
|---|---|---|---|---|
| Conservative | Keith Stainton | 39,544 | 55.0 | +7.5 |
| Labour | JB Hills | 18,972 | 26.4 | −2.0 |
| Liberal | J Roderic C Beale | 13,435 | 18.7 | −5.3 |
| Majority | | 20,572 | 28.6 | +9.5 |
| Turnout | | 71,951 | 78.7 | +3.7 |
| Conservative hold | | Swing | | |
