= Natalie Grant Wraga =

External videos
- Natalie Grant and the Critical Importance of Understanding Disinformation
- Crafting of Natalie Grant’s Book, Disinformation: Soviet Political Warfare

Natalie Grant Wraga (February 24, 1901, Revel, Russian Empire – November 12, 2002, Lovettsville, Virginia, U.S.A.), née Natalya Konstantinovna Mark (Russian: Наталия Константиновна Марк) was a Russian-born American Sovietologist.

== Early life ==
Grant was born in Revel (today Tallinn, Estonia) in the family of a Tsarist Circuit Court judge. In 1917, when Grant was 16, her family fled the Russian Revolution, moving to the United States. In the early 1920s she acquired American citizenship after marrying American citizen Malcolm Grant, although the couple divorced shortly thereafter.

== Career ==
She worked for the American Relief Administration in 1923, moving later to Riga, Latvia, to work at the American legation there as a translator and analyst, where he stayed from 1928 to 1939. Throughout the 1950s she was employed as a Sovietologist for the U.S. Department of State. where Grant became "an expert in unmasking Soviet deception methods". In 1959 Grant married former Polish intelligence chief Jerzy Niezbrzycki (also known under the pseudonym Ryszard/Richard Wraga), with whom she collaborated in her work. During the 1960s Grant moved to Menlo Park, California, and worked for the Hoover Institution at Stanford University. During her life Grant was considered an authority on one of the most important Soviet deception operations of the interwar period, Operation Trust, a phony opposition group established by the GPU in the 1920s which fed false information to Russian émigrés and foreign opponents of the new Soviet régime. Grant's work has, however, been criticised more recently, with Stanford professor Lazar Fleishman describing her articles on Trust as "teeming with false claims" and some of her conclusions "extravagant".

== Disinformation studies ==
Grant and her husband studied cases of Soviet deception operations for decades, calling attention to what is now referred as information warfare or fake news, but which can be considered a practice dating back to well before the emergence of the Soviet Union. Grant's book Disinformation: Soviet Political Warfare, 1917-1992 was published in 2020.

== Essays and other works ==
- Grant, N. (2020). Disinformation: soviet political warfare, 1917-1992. Leopolis Press. ISBN 978-1733523813
- Grant, N. (1998). "Green Cross: Gorbachev and Global Enviro-Communism". The Register, Vol. IV, No. 3 1998 Spring, pp. 58-62
- Grant, N. (1987). Deception: a Tool of Soviet Foreign Policy. Washington, DC: Nathan Hale Institute. ISBN 978-0-935067-12-5
- Grant, N. (1986). Deception on a Grand Scale. International Journal of Intelligence and Counterintelligence 1, no. 4 (1986): 51 77
- Grant, N. (1978). "The Russian Section, A Window on the Soviet Union." Diplomatic History, 2(1), 107–115.
- Grant, N. (1974). "Disinformation". Stanford, CA: The Hoover Institution on War, Revolution, and Peace.
- Grant, N. (1970). "Forgery in International Affairs." Foreign Service Journal, 47(5), 31.
- Grant, N. (1964). "The Value of a Forgery." Stanford, CA: Hoover Institute on War, Revolution, and Peace.
- Grant, N. (1963). "A Thermidorian Amalgam". The Russian Review, Vol. 22, No. 3 (Jul., 1963), pp. 253-273.
- Grant, N. (1961). "Communist Psychological Offensive: Distortions in the Translation of Official Documents." Washington, DC: Research Institute of the Sine-Soviet Bloc.
- Grant, N. (1960). "Disinformation." In "Bear and Dragon: What is the Relation Between Moscow and Peking?" Supplement to National Review, (November 5, 1960).
