= 1963 Sudbury and Woodbridge by-election =

UK Parliamentary by-election

The 1963 Sudbury and Woodbridge by-election was held in 1963 after the previous Conservative MP, John Hare was elevated to the House of Lords. The seat was held by the Conservative Party.

Sudbury and Woodbridge by-election, 1963
Party	Candidate	Votes	%	±%
Conservative	Keith Stainton	22,005	49.6	−3.4
Labour	Frank E Woodbridge	16,416	37.0	+4.0
Liberal	Aubrey Herbert	5,935	13.4	−0.6
Majority		5,589	12.6	−7.4
Turnout		44,356	70.5	−10.6
Conservative hold		Swing		
