= Richard Graves (theologian) =

Irish theological scholar and priest

Richard Graves (1763–1829) was a Church of Ireland cleric, theological scholar and author of Graves on the Pentateuch. He was a Doctor of Divinity, one of the seven Senior Fellows of Trinity College, Dublin; a member of the Royal Irish Academy; Regius Professor of Greek (Dublin); and Dean of Ardagh. He was the younger brother of Thomas Ryder Graves, Dean of Ardfert and Connor.

== Clerical and scholarly background ==
Richard Graves was born at his father's rectory in Kilfannan, near Kilmallock, County Limerick, 1 October 1763, the youngest son of Rev. James Graves (1710–1783), "an accurate and well-read scholar and to a mind imbued with classical tastes and acquirements... a conversation enlivened by a natural vivacity and a pointed but inoffensive wit (who) added so much Christian affability and kindness as to render him a general favourite in his own rank of life, and (procuring) him the esteem and affection of his parishioners of every denomination (and whose) society was much prized and proportionately sought for". James Graves had one brother, Richard, High Sheriff of Counties Limerick and Waterford; and one sister, Abigail, who married firstly Edward Southwell (1703–1736), son William Southwell; and, after his death a grandson of Sir William Scroggs.

Richard Graves' mother, Jane Ryder (1719–1810), was the daughter of Rev. Thomas Ryder (1683–1747), of Mitchelstown Rectory, County Cork, nephew and heir of the Rt. Rev. Henry Ryder (died 1695), Bishop of Killaloe, Treasurer of Cork and grandson of Bishop John Ryder. Mrs Graves' mother, Martha Badham, was a first cousin of Sir Standish Hartstonge and Sir Matthew Deane. Richard Graves's father was the rector of seven parishes at once. Five of his seven parishes, including Kilfannan, were given to him by his friend, fellow scholar, and kinsman of his both him and wife, John Boyle, 5th Earl of Cork. Mrs Graves' uncle, Brettridge Badham, had married a sister of Henry Boyle, 1st Earl of Shannon, first cousins of the 5th Earl's father, Lord Orrey.

The Graves' of County Limerick were a remarkably talented family. Originally from Yorkshire, they came to Ireland with Oliver Cromwell, when their ancestor, Colonel William Graves (who became a Cavalier after being placed in charge of Charles I of England) commanded a Regiment of Horse and was granted land there in 1647. The Colonel's descendants held various public offices in the county (Richard Graves' grandfather, John, and uncle, Richard, both served as High Sheriff of County Limerick), but the family is particularly noted for its scholars – John Greaves and Thomas Greaves; clergymen – Charles Graves, Robert Perceval Graves, etc.; But most of all writers – Richard Graves, Alfred Perceval Graves, Clotilde Graves, Philip Graves, Robert Graves and Charles Patrick Graves. Another branch of the Colonel's descendants were elevated to the peerage and became notable for the number of them (seven) who served as Admirals in the Royal Navy. Richard Graves' grandfather was a first cousin of Rear-Admiral Sir Thomas Graves, the cousin of Admiral Thomas Graves, 1st Baron Graves, nephew of Admiral Samuel Graves.

== Career ==
At a young age his father sent him to live and study in Dublin with his eldest brother, Thomas Graves. In 1780, he entered Trinity College, Dublin, under the tutorship of the Rev. William Day. Two years later, he was elected a scholar, and was said to be 'distinguished' throughout his undergraduate course as well as an active member of the College Historical Society. He graduated B.A. (1784), M.A. (1787), B.D. (1794), and D.D. (1799). In 1786, he was a successful candidate for fellowship on his first trial, becoming one of the most popular tutors at college. The following year – the same year as his marriage – he was admitted to deacon's and priest's orders.

In 1797, and again in 1801, he was elected Donnellan Lecturer, his subject being The Divine Origin of the Jewish Religion, proved from the internal evidence of the last four Books of the Pentateuch. His lectures, Graves on the Pentateuch, for which he is best remembered, were first published in London in 1807, in two octavo volumes, while he was serving as chaplain to the Duke of Richmond, Lord Lieutenant of Ireland. The work was widely acclaimed and was for many years studied by divinity students at English, Irish and American universities, and the university of Calcutta too. Nearly forty years later, and ten years after his death, the Church of England Quarterly Review wrote of his work on the Pentateuch which was still in publication:

If a strong mind, large attainments, sincere piety and a most kind and Christian deportment, be qualities that entitle their possessor to fame, then may the late Dean of Ardagh be well denominated famous; but a stronger claim to celebrity than even these could give, may be made in favour of Richard Graves. He has written on many subjects, and on all well. His work on the Pentateuch is used in the English universities as well as in Dublin. And we may safely say, that it never has been perused without great benefit. Nor are his other works indicative of less ability, though their subjects have not brought them so prominently before the religious world... The writings have taken their place among the standard productions of English Literature.

In July 1799 he was co-opted to become one of the seven senior fellows of Trinity College. Academics there led an affluent life: According to Thomas D'Arcy McGee in his book 'A Popular History of Ireland: from the Earliest Period to the Emancipation of the Catholics',

The Established Church continued, of course, to monopolise University honours, and to enjoy its princely revenues and all political advantages. Trinity College continued annually to farm its 200,000 acres (810 km^{2}) at a rental averaging 100,000 pounds sterling. Its wealth, and the uses to which it is put, are thus described by a recent writer: "Some of Trinity's senior fellows enjoy higher incomes than Cabinet ministers; many of her tutors have revenues above those of cardinals; and junior fellows, of a few days' standing, frequently decline some of her thirty-one church livings with benefices which would shame the poverty of scores of continental, not to say Irish, Catholic archbishops. Even eminent judges hold her professorships; some of her chairs are vacated for the Episcopal bench only; and majors and field officers would acquire increased pay by being promoted to the rank of head porter, first menial, in Trinity College. Apart from her princely fellowships and professorships, her seventy Foundation, and sixteen non-Foundation Scholarships, her thirty Sizarships, and her fourteen valuable Studentships, she has at her disposal an aggregate, by bequests, benefactions, and various endowments, of 117 permanent exhibitions, amounting to upwards of 2,000 pounds per annum

Graves, a member of the Royal Irish Academy, was chosen as Archbishop King's lecturer in 1799, and again in 1805. Also in 1799, he was made Professor of Oratory, in 1809 Regius Professor of Laws; in 1810 Regius Professor of Greek; and in 1806 and 1807 he held the office of University librarian. In 1814, he was appointed deputy professor of divinity, and in 1819 he succeeded his father-in-law as professor of divinity, a position he held until his death. In 1808, he had moved the college to include scripture as mandatory for all students as part of their academic instruction, and he succeeded in effecting some considerable improvements in the divinity school over which he presided from 1819.

In 1801, Graves was presented by the Dean and Chapter of Christ Church Cathedral, Dublin, to the Prebend of St. Michael's Church, Dublin, where he laboured 'assiduously and devotedly, especially amongst the poor'. He soon became widely known as a popular preacher. In 1803, the Dean and Chapter of Christ Church elected him to the prebend of St. John's, Dublin, but he declined it, as it was not tenable with his fellowship. In 1809 he was elected by the same patrons to the prebend of St. Michan's Church, but his election was set aside as informal, and the presentation for that turn lapsed to the Crown. In the same year, he was presented by the Crown to the rectory of Raheny, and in 1813 he also received from the Crown the offer of the deanery of Ardagh, which he hesitated to accept, as the appointment would have involved the resignation of his fellowship; but on being appointed deputy professor of divinity, he resigned his fellowship in 1814, and was instituted Dean of Ardagh. In 1823, he resigned the Prebend of St. Michael's, and was presented by the Dean and Chapter to the rectory of St. Mary's Church, Dublin, which benefice he held until his death.

He was a conscientious parochial minister. The Rev. Richard Sinclair Brooke wrote that Richard Graves "was a learned but rather ponderous preacher"; "A man of considerable learning and earnest piety", was how Charles Abbey described him. After the death of his wife on 22 March 1827, Graves was much shaken, and during a tour of the Lake District he was struck with paralysis. His friend, the poet Robert Southey, took him into his home at Greta Hall where he remained until he was well enough to return home. Not long afterwards he died from a repeated attack of paralysis at his country living, Raheny Rectory, 29 March 1829.

Graves was a man of sound judgment, well trained intellect, and fertile imagination; his eloquence was copious; his manner was earnest, affectionate, and awakening; he was as noted for his simplicity as for his learning, for his benevolence as for his pastoral piety

His portrait still hangs in Trinity College, Dublin, and in 1866 a memorial window of stained glass was placed in memory of him in the Chapel of Trinity College – the subjects selected were illustrations of the Pentateuch, in allusion to his work. One of his sons, Richard Hastings Graves (1791–1877), collected all his writings together and published them in four volumes in 1840. He had left a generous will, and was interred with many other members of his immediate family at a plot in Donnybrook Cemetery, where there is a plaque to his memory. He, and two of his sons (Richard and Robert) are written up in the Dictionary of National Biography.

== Family ==
On 1 August 1787, he married Eliza Mary (1767–1827), the eldest daughter of the Rev. James Drought (1738–1820) D.D., senior fellow and professor of divinity at Trinity College, Dublin, and "a member of one of the principal families of the King's County". His wife's mother, Elizabeth Maria Campbell (1750–1797), was the daughter of the Rev. John Campbell (1724–1772) LL.D., of Newgarden House; Vicar General of Tuam, a cousin of Elizabeth Gunning and Maria Gunning, by his wife Catherine Younge. Mrs Graves was the granddaughter of Sarah (Wilder) Drought, sister of the eccentric Theaker Wilder. She was also a first cousin of Henry Pearce Driscoll and Lt.-Col. Joseph Netterville Burton, the father of Sir Richard Francis Burton and Lady Stisted. In Dublin, the Graves lived on Harcourt Street, and he was provided with a country living at the Rectory house in Raheny, where he died.

The Graves were the parents of nine children. Some of their descendants include Robert James Graves (1796–1853); Sir William Collis Meredith (1812–1894); Sir Richard Graves MacDonnell (1814–1881); Edmund Allen Meredith (1817–1899); Anna Brinkley, Dowager Countess of Kingston (died 1909); John Dawson Mayne (1828–1917); Major-General Arthur Robert MacDonnell (1835–1900); Francis Brinkley (1841–1912); Frederick Edmund Meredith (1862–1941); William Gibson, 2nd Baron Ashbourne (1868–1942); Judge James Creed Meredith (1875–1942); the unfortunate Violet Gibson (1876–1956); Dean Ralph Creed Meredith (1887–1970); Cyril Connolly (1903–1974); Escott Reid (1905–1999); Hilda van Stockum (1908–2006); Willem Jacob van Stockum (1910–1944); Olivia Durdin-Robertson (b. 1917); Rowan Gillespie (b. 1953); and Anna Meredith (b. 1978).

== Published works ==
- An Essay on the Character of the Apostles and Evangelists London, 1798; 2nd edition, improved, Dublin, 1820.
- Hints on a Plan for Advancing Religious Education
- Lectures on the Four Last Books of the Pentateuch preached in the chapel of Trinity College, Dublin, 2 vols., London, 1807; 2nd edition, with large additions, 1815.
- The First Prælection delivered as Professor of Divinity by Richard Graves 1815; 2nd edition, with additions, 1820.
- Select Scriptural Proofs of the Trinity, in four Discourses, with Notes and Illustrations London, 1819.
- Calvinistic Predestination Repugnant to the General Tenor of Scripture; in a series of discourses London, 1825; 2nd edition, 1829.
- Sermons on Practical Subjects London, 1830.
