= Valley Ridge (Winter sports resort) =

Coordinates: 52.10926°N 1.06822°E

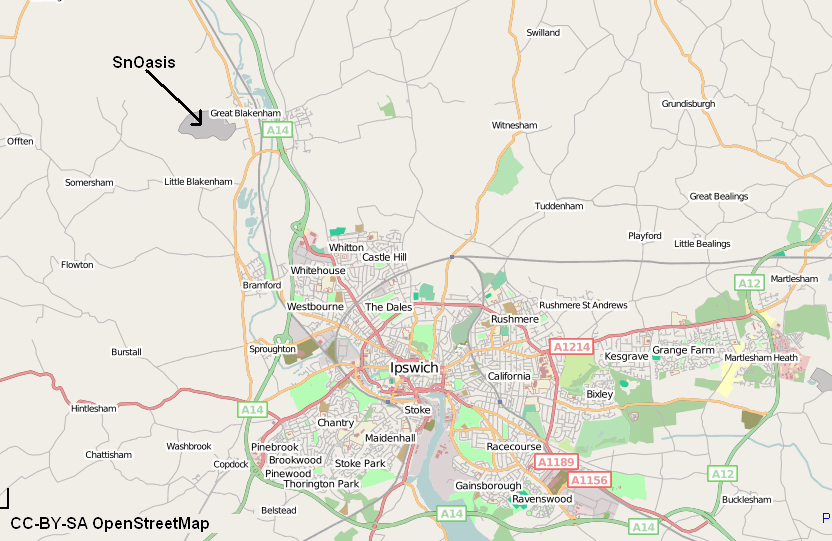
- Location of Valley Ridge (marked as SnOasis)
- Location: Great Blakenham
- Proposer: Valley Ridge Holdings
- Cost estimate: £500m

Valley Ridge (formerly known as SnOasis) was a proposed ski and sports resort in Great Blakenham near Ipswich, Suffolk, England. In March 2021, the plan was for a £500 million investment based around a 180-metre ski slope and a water park.

Plans submitted in 2004 were approved in 2008, and after no work had started were renewed in April 2020, but substantially altered plans were released less than a year later. The approved plans include a 415 metre long slope which would have become the largest real snow indoor ski slope in the world, along with a casino and nightclub, and were opposed by local groups.

The plans were abandoned because of a conflicting plan for extension of a nearby landfill site.

== History ==
The site's history as a proposed ski centre goes back to 2001, when it was acquired by Onslow Suffolk Ltd, and planning permission was applied for in 2004. Local planning permission for the project was granted on 21 April 2006 and public inquiry was announced on 26 July 2006 which upheld the decision, subject to conditions. Final government approval was granted by Hazel Blears on 6 November 2008 concluding that all the conditions had been met. After a lengthy process, in April 2020 Mid Suffolk District Council approved the Snoasis development to proceed.

Later that year, the project was relaunched under new management with the name Valley Ridge, and in March 2021, they launched a major consultation exercise with new plans, reconfigured as a holiday park orientated towards family groups, with self-catering accommodation, a 450-bed hotel, indoor winter sports facilities, outdoor pursuits and retail and catering outlets.

Some 975,000 visitors were expected per year, of which 428,000 would have been overnight visitors. 2500 parking spaces were proposed, with around 1500-1600 of those spaces for the overnight visitors.

The developers estimated that the scheme would have created 1800 direct jobs.

In August 2021, the developers threatened to withdraw their plans if a neighbouring landfill site were to be successful in extending its licence from 2022 until 2035. Because that decision rests with the county council, with the holiday village being a decision within the remit of the district council, the district council asked the Ministry of Housing, Communities and Local Government to intervene.

Suffolk County Council, in October 2022, extended the landfill site's licence to December 2030, with two further years to restore the site. Although the County Council cabinet member responsible for Economic Development, Transport Strategy and Waste expressed the hope that this earlier date meant the Valley Ridge development might be delivered, plans were dropped some six months later.

== Opposition ==
=== Traffic ===
Concern was expressed by some local residents over potential traffic congestion. They stated that the traffic modelling at the Copdock Roundabout was unrealistic and was based on only 737,000 visitors in first year and 825,000 in the second without sufficient sensitivity testing for higher traffic levels. They also expressed concern about the potential for traffic from the south to 'rat run' through Sproughton saying this had not been considered. The developers offered in 2010 to pay for improvements to the Copdock intersection of the A12 and A14.

=== Biodiversity ===
Part of the site is in a Special Landscape Area designated a County Wildlife Site by Suffolk Wildlife Trust and protected great crested newts and badgers would have had to be moved as part of the planning agreement. The Suffolk Wildlife Trust objected on the basis that there would be a "significant loss to biodiversity". Natural England objected from the start saying that insufficient measures to protect great crested newts on the site.

=== Damage to the rural nature of the area ===
It was stated that the huge development would be out of character with the rural location with increased noise, air and light pollution with a negative effect on tranquillity in the area although they are adding 140,000 trees in 40 acres (160,000 m^{2}).

=== Climate change ===
sNOasis Concern estimated that the previous plan would be likely to generate at least 34,000 tons of CO_{2} per annum exacerbating climate change and that the proposed 40 acres (160,000 m^{2}) of woodland would only cover 10% of the emissions. The former developers claimed that 75% of their energy will come from renewable sources including a large-scale woodchip burner and a proposed "energy from waste" incinerator on land adjacent to the site was also proposed and they also plan to plant 130,000 trees to act as a carbon sink.
