= Richard Hare, Viscount Ennismore =

Anglo-Irish politician (1773–1827)

Colonel Richard Lysaght Hare, Viscount Ennismore (20 March 1773 – 24 September 1827) was an Anglo-Irish politician.

Ennismore was the son of William Hare, 1st Earl of Listowel, and Mary, the only daughter of Henry Wrixon of Ballygiblin. He sat in the Irish House of Commons as the Member of Parliament for Athy alongside his father from 1798 until the seat's disenfranchisement under the Acts of Union 1800. He subsequently represented County Cork in the UK Parliament as a Tory from 1812 to 1827.

He married Hon. Catherine Dillon, eldest daughter of Robert Dillon, 1st Baron Clonbrock, on 10 June 1797, and together they had seven children. Styled The Honourable from 1800, he assumed the courtesy title Viscount Ennismore when his father was made Earl of Listowel in 1822. Ennismore predeceased his father, dying in 1827, meaning his father's titles were inherited by his eldest son, William Hare, 2nd Earl of Listowel.

Parliament of Ireland
Preceded by Frederick Falkiner; Arthur Ormsby	Member of Parliament for Athy; 1798–1800; With: William Hare	Succeeded by Constituency disenfranchised
Parliament of the United Kingdom
Preceded by Viscount Bernard; Hon. George Ponsonby	Member of Parliament for County Cork; 1812–1827; With: Viscount Bernard (1812–1818); Viscount Kingsborough (1818–1826); Robert King (1826–1827)	Succeeded by Robert King; John Boyle
