= Richard Hare, 4th Earl of Listowel =

Irish peer and British Army officer

The Right Honourable The Earl of Listowel

Member of the House of Lords Lord Temporal
- In office 5 June 1924 – 16 November 1931; Hereditary Peerage
- Preceded by: The 3rd Earl of Listowel
- Succeeded by: The 5th Earl of Listowel

Personal details
- Born: 12 September 1866
- Died: 16 November 1931 (aged 65)
- Spouse: Hon. Freda Vanden-Bempde-Johnstone (m. 1904)
- Children: 6, including William and John
- Parent(s): William Hare, 3rd Earl of Listowel; Lady Ernestine Brudenell-Bruce

Richard Granville Hare, 4th Earl of Listowel (12 September 1866 – 16 November 1931), styled Viscount Ennismore from 1866 to 1924, was an Irish peer and British Army officer.

== Background ==
Lord Ennismore was the eldest son of William Hare, 3rd Earl of Listowel and Lady Ernestine Brudenell-Bruce, daughter of the 3rd Marquess of Ailesbury and Hon. Louise Horsley Beresford ( daughter of the 2nd Baron Decies). He was educated at Eton and at Christ Church, Oxford. Commissioned as a lieutenant into the Grenadier Guards in 1890, he later transferred to the 4th (Militia) Battalion of the Royal Munster Fusiliers.

== Career ==
Following the outbreak of the Second Boer War in late 1899, Lord Ennismore was seconded for active service with the Imperial Yeomanry, and on 3 February 1900 appointed a lieutenant of the 45th (Dublin) Company, attached to the 13th Battalion, Imperial Yeomanry. The company left for South Africa in the middle of March 1900.

He was then subsequently on the Western Front for the Great War, where he was promoted to Major as a volunteer for the County of London regiment, before being transferred back to the Royal Munster Fusiliers. It was not until 5 June 1924 that he came into his inheritance as Viscount and Earl of Listowel, and Baron Hare of Convamore, as well as Baron Ennismore.

== Personal life ==
He married Hon. Freda Vanden-Bempde-Johnstone, daughter of Francis Vanden-Bempde-Johnstone, 2nd Baron Derwent, by Ethel Strickland-Constable, and they had six children:

- William Francis Hare, 5th Earl of Listowel (28 September 1906 – 12 March 1997)
- Hon. Richard Gilbert Hare (5 September 1907 – 14 September 1966)
- John Hugh Hare, 1st Viscount Blakenham (22 January 1911 – 7 March 1982)
- Lady Ethel Patricia Hare (29 October 1912 – 24 October 2005)
- Lady Elizabeth Cecilia Hare (8 May 1914 – 1990), married Arthur Guinness, Viscount Elveden (son and heir to Rupert Guinness, 2nd Earl of Iveagh)
- Major Hon. Alan Victor Hare (14 March 1919 – 10 April 1995)

Peerage of Ireland
Preceded by William Hare	Earl of Listowel; 1924–1931	Succeeded by William Hare
