= Viscount Blakenham =

Viscountcy in the Peerage of the United Kingdom

Viscountcy Blakenham
- Blazon Escutcheon: Arms of Hare: Gules, two Bars and a Chief indented Or. Crest: A Demi-Lion Argent, ducally gorged Or. Supporters: Dexter: a Dragon Ermine, armed and langued Gules. Sinister: a Guernsey Cow proper.
- Creation date: 8 November 1963
- Created by: Queen Elizabeth II
- Peerage: Peerage of the United Kingdom
- First holder: John Hugh Hare
- Present holder: Caspar Hare, 3rd Viscount
- Heir apparent: Inigo Hare
- Remainder to: the 1st Viscount's heirs male of the body lawfully begotten.
- Motto: ODI PROFANUM (I hate whatever is profane)

Viscount Blakenham, of Little Blakenham in the County of Suffolk, is a title in the Peerage of the United Kingdom. It was created in 1963 for the Conservative politician and former Secretary of State for War, John Hare. He was the third son of Richard Hare, 4th Earl of Listowel (see Earl of Listowel for earlier history of the family). As of 2018 the title is held by his grandson, the third Viscount, a professor at the Massachusetts Institute of Technology who succeeded his father, a former chairman of Pearson PLC, in that year. As a great-grandson of the fourth Earl of Listowel, he is also in remainder (as of 2018 second in line) to this peerage and its subsidiary titles.

== Viscounts Blakenham (1963) ==
- John Hugh Hare, 1st Viscount Blakenham (1911–1982)
- Michael John Hare, 2nd Viscount Blakenham (1938–2018)
- Caspar John Hare, 3rd Viscount Blakenham (born 1972)

The heir apparent is the present holder's son, Hon. Inigo Hare.

== See also ==
- Earl of Listowel
