= Robert King, 4th Earl of Kingston =

Irish Earl

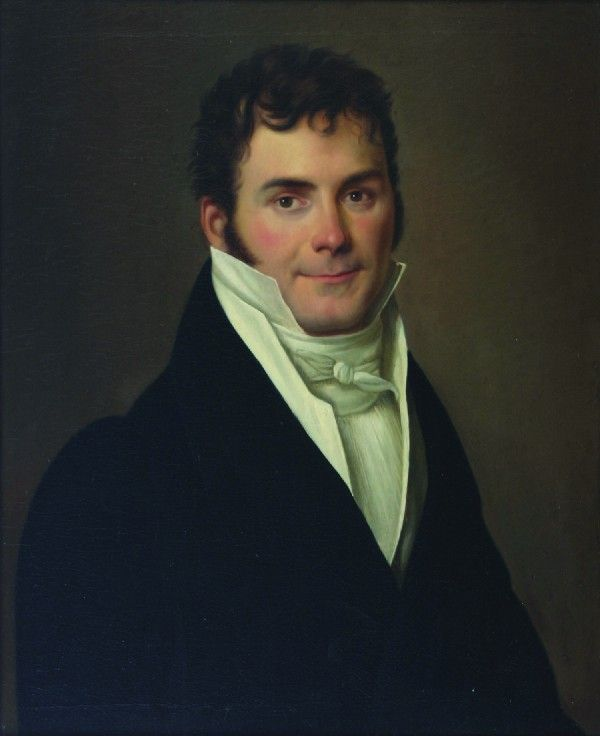
Lord Kingston

Robert Henry King, 4th Earl of Kingston (4 October 1796 – 21 January 1867), styled The Honourable Robert King until 1837 and Viscount Kingsborough between 1837 and 1839, was an Irish peer, soldier and Whig politician.

== Background and education ==
Kingston was the second but eldest surviving son of George King, 3rd Earl of Kingston, and Lady Helena, daughter of Stephen Moore, 1st Earl of Mount Cashell. He was educated at Exeter College, Oxford.

== Military career ==
Kingston served in the British army in occupied France after the fall of the Emperor Napoleon.

== Political career ==
Kingston was returned to Parliament for County Cork in 1826 (succeeding his elder brother Lord Kingsborough), a seat he held until 1832. In 1836, he was High Sheriff of County Cork. He gained the courtesy title Viscount Kingsborough when he became heir apparent to the earldom on the death of his elder brother in 1837. He succeeded to the earldom on the death of his father in 1839.

== Personal life ==
Lord Kingston was arrested on 30 March 1848 for "having indecently assaulted a young man named Cull, with intent to commit an unnatural offence" with a 20-year-old man he met on Oxford Street in London. When Cull resisted his advances, Kingston gave him money to buy a glass of ale at a nearby public house, and left quickly. Instead of buying the ale, Cull went to find a policeman, who followed and arrested Kingston. He was taken to Marylebone police station and held overnight. The next morning he appeared before a magistrate and was charged with indecent assault on the younger man—a misdemeanour at that time—and was required to post bail in the astronomical amount of £10,000 (equivalent to £1,270,000 in 2023). The case was referred to a grand jury at the Central Criminal Court the following week, but the grand jury "ignored" the charge.

Lord Kingston died unmarried in January 1867, aged 70. He was succeeded in the earldom by his younger brother, James.

Parliament of the United Kingdom
Preceded by Viscount Ennismore; Viscount Kingsborough	Member of Parliament for County Cork; 1826–1832; With: Viscount Ennismore 1826–1827; John Boyle 1827–1830; Viscount Boyle 1830–1832	Succeeded by Feargus Edward O'Connor; Garrett Standish Barry
Peerage of Ireland
Preceded by George King	Earl of Kingston; 1839–1867	Succeeded by James King
