= William Hare, 1st Earl of Listowel =

Irish peer and Member of Parliament

William Hare, 1st Earl of Listowel (September 1751 – 13 July 1837), known as Lord Ennismore from 1800 to 1816 and as the Viscount Ennismore and Listowel from 1816 to 1822, was an Irish peer and politician.

== Life ==
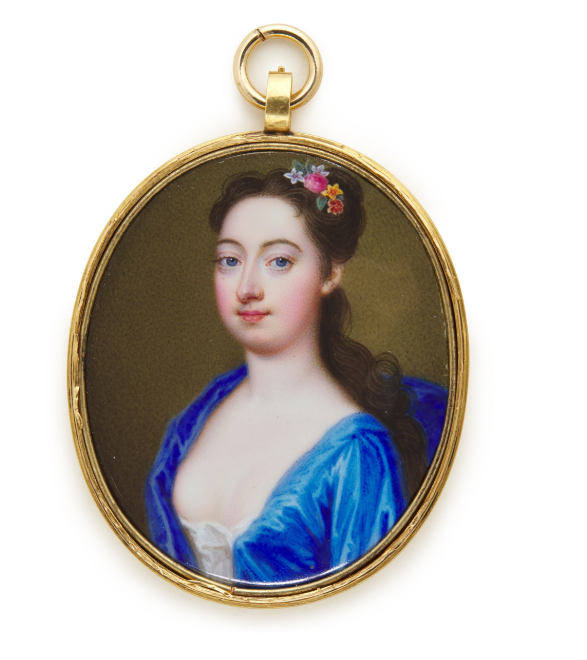
An unknown lady previously identified as Lady Ennismore (c. 1720) by Christian Friedrich Zincke

He was the second son of Richard Hare of Ennismore, County Kerry, and Catherine (also known as Margaret) daughter of Samuel Maylor. An older brother, John, died unmarried in 1774.

In 1796, Hare was elected to the Irish House of Commons for Cork City, a seat he held only until 1797, and then represented Athy from 1798 until the Act of Union in 1801. The latter year he was raised to the Peerage of Ireland as on 31 July 1800 Baron Ennismore, in the County of Kerry. In January 1816 he was created Viscount Ennismore and Listowel and on 5 February 1822 he was even further honoured when he was elevated to Earl of Listowel in County Kerry in the Peerage of Ireland.

Lord Listowel married, firstly, Mary, only daughter of Henry Wrixon of Ballygiblin, County Cork, in 1772. After her death in 1810 he married, secondly, in 1812 or on 2 March 1815, Anne, second daughter of John Latham of Meldrum, County Tipperary. By his first wife he had:

- Richard Lysaght, Viscount Ennismore (1773–1827) married Hon. Catherine Dillon, eldest daughter of Robert Dillon, 1st Baron Clonbrock
- William Henry (1782–1848) married on 17 July 1806 Charlotte, only daughter of Isaac Baugh, leaving issue.
- Margaret Anne (died 1835) married in 1799, Richard White, 1st Earl of Bantry
- Mary (died 1841) married in 1803 Charles Morley Balders of Barsham, Norfolk
- Louisa (died 1855) married in 1817 John Bushe, eldest son of Chief Justice Charles Kendal Bushe
- Catherine (died 1864) married in 1808 Richard Maunsell (died 1819).

He died on 13 July 1837, aged 85, and was succeeded in his titles by his grandson William, his son Richard Hare, Viscount Ennismore, having predeceased him. Lady Listowel died in 1859.

== Notes ==
Parliament of Ireland
| Preceded by Hon. John Hely-Hutchinson; Richard Longfield | Member of Parliament for Cork City; 1796–1797; With: Hon. John Hely-Hutchinson | Succeeded by Hon. John Hely-Hutchinson; Mountifort Longfield |
| Preceded by Arthur Ormsby; Frederick Falkiner | Member of Parliament for Athy; 1798–1801; With: Richard Hare | Succeeded by Parliament of the United Kingdom |
Peerage of Ireland
| New creation | Earl of Listowel; 1822–1837 | Succeeded by William Hare |
| New creation | Viscount Ennismore and Listowel; 1816–1837 | Succeeded by William Hare |
| New creation | Baron Ennismore; 1800–1837 | Succeeded by William Hare |
