= William Hare, 2nd Earl of Listowel =

Anglo-Irish politician

William Hare, 2nd Earl of Listowel, KP (22 September 1801 – 4 February 1856), known as Viscount Ennismore from 1827 to 1837, was an Irish peer and politician.

== Life ==
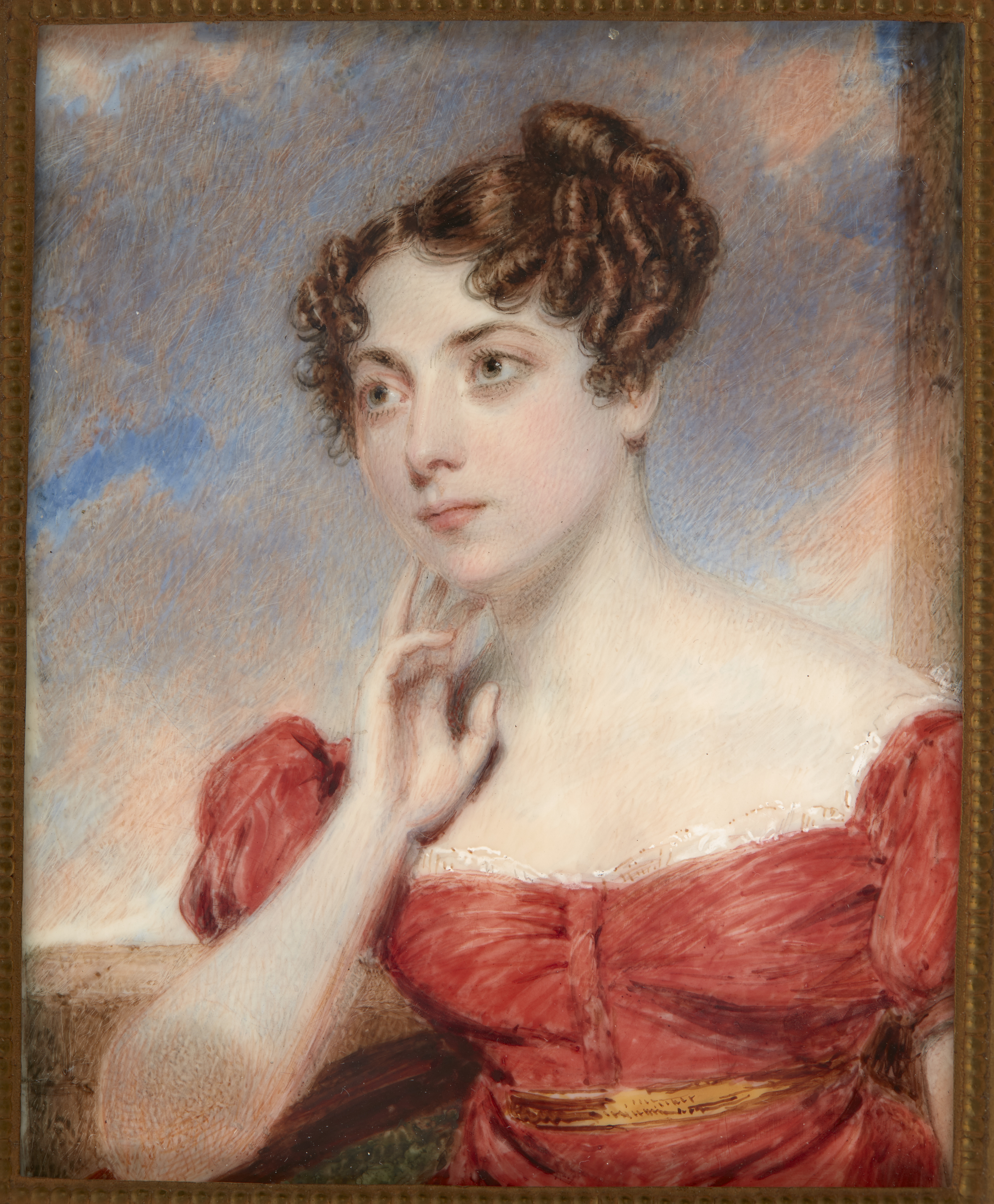
Maria Augusta Windham, Lord Listowel's wife (1824), painting by George Clint, collection of the National Museum in Kraków

Listowel was the eldest son of Richard Hare, Viscount Ennismore, and Catherine Bridget Dillon. William Hare, 1st Earl of Listowel, was his grandfather. He was elected Whig MP for County Kerry in 1826, a seat he held until 1830. He was appointed High Sheriff of County Cork in 1834. In 1837 he succeeded his grandfather in the earldom but as this was an Irish peerage it did not entitle him to a seat in the House of Lords. During Melbourne's Whig ministry, he served as Vice-Admiral of Munster and was made a Knight of the Order of St Patrick in 1839. Listowel instead returned to the House of Commons in 1841 when he was elected Whig MP for St Albans, a constituency he represented until 1846. In the latter part of his career, he served the Whig government of Lord John Russell in the House of Lords as a Lord-in-Waiting to Queen Victoria, in which office he continued under Peelite Lord Aberdeen.

Lord Listowel married Maria Augusta Windham, daughter of Vice-Admiral William Lukin Windham, on 23 July 1831. He died in February 1856, aged 54, and was succeeded in his titles by his eldest son William Hare, 3rd Earl of Listowel. Lady Listowel died in 1871.

- Augusta Maria (1832–1881) married 4th Earl of Carysfort
- William, 3rd Earl of Listowel (1833–1924)
- Emily Catherine (1834–1916) married Sir John Wrixon-Becher
- Sophia Eliza (1835–1912)
- Richard, Rear-Admiral (1836–1903)
- Ralph, Major RHA (1838–1879)
- Hugh Henry, Lt Bengal SC (1839–1927) married Georgiana Caroline, third daughter of Colonel Birnie Browne, Bengal Artillery.
- Victoria Alexandrina (1840–1927) married 3rd Earl of Yarborough, and secondly, John Maunsell Richardson of Edmundthorpe Hall.
- Edward Charles (1842)
- Adela Maria (1845–1912), twin of Eleanor Cecilia, married Colonel Cuthbert Larking (d.1910) of 15th Hussars
- Eleanor Cecilia (1845–1924), twin of Adela Maria, married 1st Baron Heneage, PC (d.1922)

== Notes ==
Bibliography

- Kidd, Charles, Williamson, David (eds.) Debrett's Peerage and Baronetage London and New York: St Martin's Press, 1990.
- Charles Mosley, Burke's Peerage and Baronetage, (106th edition, 1999), vol.1, p. 1735
- Charles Mosley, Burke's Peerage and Baronetage, (107th edition, 2003), vol.2, p. 2365

Parliament of the United Kingdom
Preceded by James Crosbie; Maurice Fitzgerald	Member of Parliament for County Kerry; 1826–1830; With: Maurice Fitzgerald	Succeeded by William Browne; Maurice Fitzgerald
Preceded by Edward Grimston; George Muskett	Member of Parliament for St Albans; 1841–1846; With: George Muskett 1841; George Repton 1841–46	Succeeded by George Repton; Benjamin Bond Cabbell
Peerage of Ireland
Preceded by William Hare	Earl of Listowel; 1837–1856	Succeeded by William Hare
