= Jerzy Niezbrzycki =

Polish military officer (1902–1968)

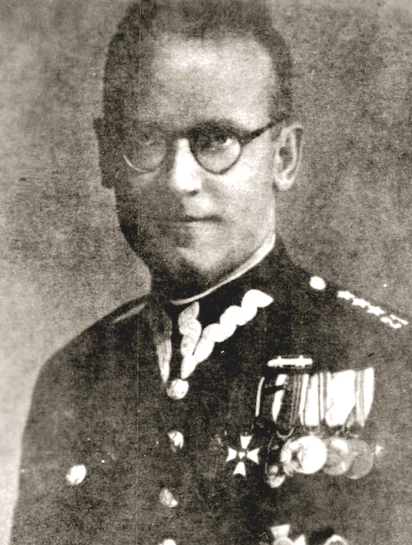
Jerzy Niezbrzycki

Jerzy Niezbrzycki (a.k.a. Ryszard Wraga; 1902 – 1968), was a captain of the Polish Army, an officer of the Polish intelligence service, whose main field of interest was the Soviet Union. He also was the director of the Department "East" of the Second Bureau of the Headquarters of the Polish Army

== Early life ==
Niezbrzycki was born on 27 July 1902 in Vinnitsa, in a well-educated family. His father traveled across imperial Russia, helping with the construction of several factories. His mother died when Jerzy was only two, so he was brought up mostly by older sister Emilia and by an uncle, who raised the boy in a Catholic and patriotic way. Young Niezbrzycki loved books of Henryk Sienkiewicz, and at the age of 15, he joined the paramilitary organization Polska Organizacja Wojskowa (POW).

== Military service ==
In December 1918 he became the leader of a scouts sabotage unit, which attacked the Soviets stationed in Ukraine. During one of the raids, at Koziatyn rail station, he was arrested, but managed to escape from jail. Later, during the Polish-Soviet War, he carried out several missions behind the Soviet front line. As an 18-year-old boy, he was twice sentenced to death by the Soviets, but always escaped. In September 1920 he joined the Ukrainian Army of Simon Petlura, serving there until 1922.

After the war Niezbrzycki, who took education both in Polish and Russian, was introduced to Józef Piłsudski, who offered him a job in the Headquarters of the Polish Army. His task was to work in Polish-Soviet border districts, simultaneously, he studied law and politics at the Warsaw University, his main interest was the Soviet Union and its politics. Also, he promoted the Polish-Ukrainian union, seen by him as a counterbalance to Russia and its might.

== Government agent ==
In 1928, Niezbrzycki was sent to the Polish consulate in Kharkiv. Officially, he was a diplomat, but unofficially, he was the intelligence agent. Regarded as one of the best agents, he was a top expert on the Soviet Union and his task was to gather information about the Red Army. In the mid-1930s he witnessed the Ukrainian Famine, about which he wrote shocking articles, published in Polish magazines.

== Political writings ==
Also, using the pseudonym Ryszard Wraga, Niezbrzycki wrote several articles about the Soviet Union. He predicted that the Soviets would attack Poland, in 1935 he wrote: "We are located between two strongest imperialist powers in the world. There is no doubt that sooner or later these powers will shake their hands over our heads. The only thing we have to know is when it will happen". In 1938 he was a candidate for the post of director of the Polish Radio, his radio programs about the Soviet Union, in which he described the grim reality of everyday life in that country, were very popular. However, he became editor in chief of the army's Polska Zbrojna magazine.

== Escape to Romania ==
After 17 September 1939 (see: Polish September Campaign), Niezbrzycki escaped to Romania, where he continued his intelligence activities. From the beginning, he predicted the defeat of Nazi Germany and the victory of the Soviets, and Communism still was his main interest. Later, he moved to the West, but regarded as a pro-Piłsudski activist, he was not favored by the government of General Władysław Sikorski. For a while, Niezbrzycki taught at a school of Polish intelligence officers, but was sidelined and temporarily interned at a camp in Rothesay.

== Later life ==
After the war, Niezbrzycki found job in the Information Department of Polish Government in Exile in London. In 1949 he moved to Paris, then to the United States, where took up a job at the Library of Congress, then at the Hoover Institute, where he taught Soviet affairs. He always argued that the Soviet Union was the biggest threat to the West, and wrote that "East knows West too well, but West knows nothing about the East".

== Death ==
In the 1960s he got cancer and died on 30 January 1968. He was buried in Leesburg, Virginia. His wife Natalie Wraga, born Natalie Konstantinovna Mark, died on 12 November 2002 at the age of 101 years.
