= Michael Hare, 2nd Viscount Blakenham =

British noble (1938–2018)

Michael Hare
- Viscount Blakenham
- Tenure: 1982–2018
- Predecessor: John Hugh Hare
- Successor: Caspar John Hare
- Born: 25 January 1938
- Died: 8 January 2018 (aged 79)
- Spouse: Marcia Persephone Hare (m. 1965)
- Issue: 3, including Cressida Cowell
- Father: John Hare, 1st Viscount Blakenham
- Mother: Beryl Nancy Pearson
- Occupation: Environmentalist

Michael John Hare, 2nd Viscount Blakenham (25 January 1938 – 8 January 2018), was a British hereditary peer and environmentalist.

Blankenham was the son of Conservative politician and government minister John Hare, 1st Viscount Blakenham and Hon. Beryl Nancy Pearson, daughter of Harold Pearson, 2nd Viscount Cowdray.

After some time working for partly or wholly owned subsidiaries, he joined the senior management of Pearson plc (founded by his mother's ancestors) in 1977, and was managing director from 1978 to 1983, chief executive from 1978 to 1993, and chairman from 1983 to 1997. He also was Chief Executive (1983–93) and Chairman (1984–93) of the Financial Times, then a Pearson subsidiary.

A lifelong environmentalist, Blakenham was chairman of the Royal Botanical Gardens at Kew Gardens as well as Council Chairman of the Royal Society for the Protection of Birds between 1982 and 1986 and president of Suffolk Wildlife Trust from between 1983 and 1987. He continued to develop the Blakenham Woodland Garden, which was created by his father. He also owned the island of Little Colonsay in the Inner Hebrides.

Blakenham lived in Suffolk and led the local political party Suffolk Together. He represented the party as a member of Mid Suffolk District Council from 2007 to 2015 under the name Michael Blakenham. During the 2014 European Parliament election he endorsed Rupert Read, lead candidate on the Green list in the East of England constituency.

Through his sister, Joanna Freda Hare, he was a brother-in-law of Stephen Breyer, who served as a Justice of the United States Supreme Court from 1994 to 2022.

== Family ==
In January 1965 Blakenham married his 18-year-old first cousin, Marcia Persephone Hare (her father, his father's brother the Hon Alan Hare (1919–1995), preceded him as head of the Financial Times). Lord and Lady Blakenham had a son and two daughters:

- His son and successor, Caspar John Hare, 3rd Viscount Blakenham (born 1972), a philosophy professor at the Massachusetts Institute of Technology. married Melissa Mohr and has two children:
  - Thomasina
  - Inigo
- author Cressida Cowell (born 1966), married Simon John Cowell and has 3 children:
  - Maisie
  - Clementine
  - Alexander
- artist Emily Faccini (born 1967), married Ben Faccini and has 3 children:
  - Francesco
  - Delfina
  - Bay

He died in January 2018 at the age of 79.

Peerage of the United Kingdom
Preceded by John Hugh Hare	Viscount Blakenham; 1982–2018	Succeeded by Caspar John Hare
