= James King, 5th Earl of Kingston =

Irish Earl

James King, 5th Earl of Kingston (8 April 1800 - 8 September 1869), styled The Honourable James King between 1839 and 1867, was an Irish peer.

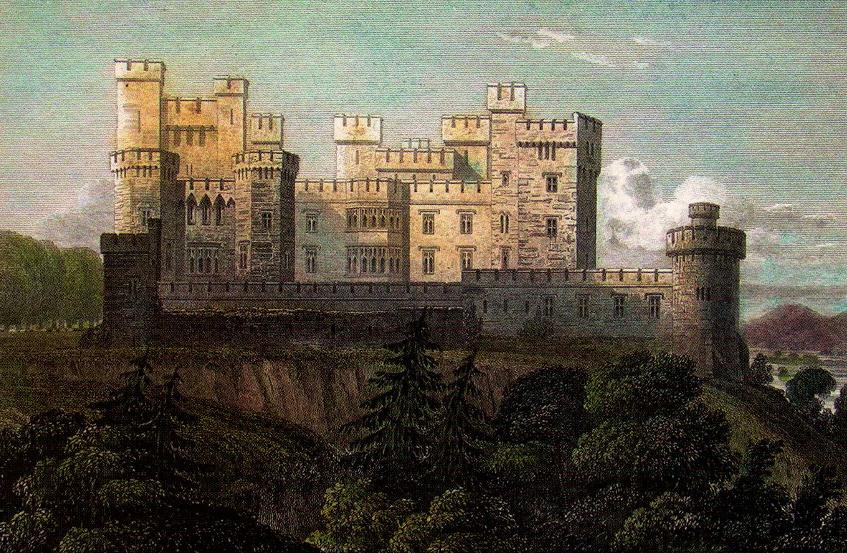
Early 19th century painting of the new Mitchelston Castle, now demolished

King was the youngest child of George King, 3rd Earl of Kingston and Lady Helena Moore, daughter of Stephen Moore, 1st Earl Mount Cashell. Educated at Trinity College, Dublin, he was admitted to King's Inn, Dublin, becoming a barrister in 1825. He was admitted to Lincoln's Inn in 1827. After the death of his troublesome elder brother Robert in 1867, King succeeded to his family's titles and their seat at Mitchelstown Castle in the north of County Cork.

Lord Kingston died at Mitchelstown Castle in September 1869, aged 69. He had married Anna Brinkley (died 1909) of Parsonstown, County Meath, granddaughter of John Brinkley and Richard Graves, in 1860. He left no children and his junior title of Baron Kingston died with him. He was succeeded in the remaining titles by his kinsman Robert King, 2nd Viscount Lorton, who became the 6th Earl.

Kingston's wife and sole heir to his estate, now styled the Dowager Countess of Kingston, continued to live at and manage the crumbling affairs of Mitchelstown, aided from 1873 by her second husband, William Downes Webber, of Kellyville, Queen's County. After her death, Webber continued to live there with his family until it was taken over, plundered and finally burned to the ground by the Irish Republican Army in 1922 during the Irish War of Independence.

Peerage of Ireland
Preceded by Robert Henry King	Earl of Kingston; 1867–1869	Succeeded by Robert King
Peerage of the United Kingdom
Preceded by Robert Henry King	Baron Kingston; 1867–1869	Extinct
