= William Hare, 5th Earl of Listowel =

British Labour politician (1906–1997)

The Right Honourable The Earl of Listowel GCMG PC
- Listowel in 1962, by Walter Bird

Governor-General of Ghana
- In office 13 November 1957 – 1 July 1960
- Monarch: Elizabeth II
- Prime Minister: Kwame Nkrumah
- Preceded by: Kobina Arku Korsah
- Succeeded by: Office abolished
Other ministerial offices
Parliamentary Secretary to the Ministry of Agriculture and Fisheries
In office 22 November 1950 – 26 October 1951 Serving with George-Brown
Monarch	George VI
Prime Minister	Clement Attlee
Preceded by	The Earl of Huntingdon; Percy Collick
Succeeded by	The Lord Carrington; Richard Nugent
Minister of State for the Colonies
In office 4 January 1948 – 28 February 1950
Monarch	George VI
Prime Minister	Clement Attlee
Preceded by	New office
Succeeded by	John Dugdale
Secretary of State for Burma
In office 14 August 1947 – 4 January 1948
Monarch	George VI
Prime Minister	Clement Attlee
Preceded by	New office
Succeeded by	Office abolished
Secretary of State for India and Burma
In office 17 April 1947 – 14 August 1947
Monarch	George VI
Prime Minister	Clement Attlee
Preceded by	The Lord Pethick-Lawrence
Succeeded by	Office abolished,Jawaharlal Nehru as Prime Minister of India and Liaquat Ali Khan as Prime Minister of Pakistan; Himself (Burma)
Minister of Information
In office 26 February 1946 – 31 March 1946
Monarch	George VI
Prime Minister	Clement Attlee
Preceded by	Edward Williams
Succeeded by	Office abolished
Postmaster General
In office 19 October 1945 – 17 April 1947
Monarch	George VI
Prime Minister	Clement Attlee
Preceded by	Harry Crookshank
Succeeded by	Wilfred Paling
Parliamentary Under-Secretary of State for India and Burma Deputy Leader of the House of Lords
In office 31 October 1944 – 23 May 1945
Monarch	George VI
Prime Minister	Winston Churchill
Preceded by	The Earl of Munster
Succeeded by	The Earl of Scarbrough

Member of the House of Lords Lord Temporal
- In office 16 November 1931 – 12 March 1997; Hereditary Peerage
- Preceded by: The 4th Earl of Listowel
- Succeeded by: The 6th Earl of Listowel

Personal details
- Born: 28 September 1906
- Died: 12 March 1997 (aged 90)
- Party: Labour
- Spouse(s): Judith de Marffy-Mantuana (m. 1933; div. 1945) Stephanie Wise (m. 1958; div. 1963) Pamela Day (m. 1963)
- Children: 5, including Francis
- Parent: Richard Hare, 4th Earl of Listowel (father)
- Education: Balliol College, Oxford; Magdalene College, Cambridge; King's College London (PhD)

William Francis Hare, 5th Earl of Listowel, GCMG, PC (28 September 1906 – 12 March 1997), styled Viscount Ennismore between 1924 and 1931, was an Anglo-Irish peer and Labour politician. He was the last Secretary of State for India, as well as the last Governor-General of Ghana.

== Background and education ==
Lord Listowel was the eldest son of Richard Hare, 4th Earl of Listowel, and Freda, daughter of Francis Vanden-Bempde-Johnstone, 2nd Baron Derwent. His brothers included Professor Richard Gilbert Hare, an expert on Russian art and literature, and John Hare, 1st Viscount Blakenham, a Conservative Cabinet minister, was his younger brother. He was educated at Eton College, Balliol College, Oxford, Magdalene College, Cambridge (BA, 1929) and King's College London (PhD, 1932).

== Political career ==
Listowel served as a lieutenant in the Intelligence Corps. He entered the House of Lords on the death of his father in November 1931, by right of the United Kingdom peerage of Baron Hare, and made his maiden speech in March of the following year. He was a Labour Party whip in the Lords from 1941 to 1944, and Deputy Leader of the House of Lords and Under-Secretary of State for India and Burma from 1944 to 1945.

When Labour came to power in 1945 under Clement Attlee, Listowel was appointed Postmaster General, a post he held until April 1947, and was briefly Minister of Information between February and March 1946, when the office was abolished.

In April 1947 he entered the cabinet as Secretary of State for India and Burma. Prime Minister Clement Attlee, however, made all the government's major decisions regarding India. After India gained independence in August 1947, his cabinet title became Secretary of State for Burma, working from the Burma Office, but in January 1948 this too was abolished, when Burma also gained independence, and Listowel then left the cabinet. He continued to serve under Attlee as Minister of State for Colonial Affairs from 1948 to 1950 and as Joint Parliamentary Secretary to the Ministry of Agriculture and Fisheries from 1950 to 1951. In 1957, he was appointed Governor-General of Ghana, a post he held until 1960, when Ghana became a Republic. He was later Chairman of Committees in the House of Lords between 1965 and 1976. He remained an active member of the House of Lords, speaking for the last time in July 1995, aged 88.

Apart from his career in national politics, Lord Listowel was a member of the London County Council for East Lewisham between 1937 and 1946, and for Battersea North between 1952 and 1957. He was appointed a Privy Counsellor in 1946 and a GCMG in 1957.

== Animal welfare ==
Listowel was an opponent of blood sports and was President of the League Against Cruel Sports from 1963 to 1967 when he resigned following his appointment as Chairman of Committees in the House of Lords. He was succeeded by Donald Soper.

== Family ==
Lord Listowel married three times. Firstly he married Judith, daughter of Raoul de Marffy-Mantuana, on 24 July 1933. They had one daughter:

- Lady Deirdre Elisabeth Mary Freda Hare (born 13 February 1935), married firstly John Norton, 7th Baron Grantley and then, after his death, Ian Curteis.

Lord and Lady Listowel were divorced in 1945. He married secondly Stephanie Sandra Yvonne Wise on 1 July 1958. They also had one daughter:

- Lady Fiona Eve Akua Hare (born 24 February 1960)

They were divorced in 1963 and on 4 October 1963 Lord Listowel married thirdly Pamela Mollie Day. They had two sons and one daughter:

- Francis Michael Hare, 6th Earl of Listowel (born 28 June 1964)
- Lady Diana France Hare (born 7 December 1965)
- Hon Timothy Patrick Hare (born 1966)

Pamela, Countess Listowel, lives in Hampstead.

== Death ==
Lord Listowel died in March 1997, aged 90, and was succeeded by his elder son from his third marriage, Francis.

Political offices
Preceded by The Earl of Munster	Under-Secretary of State for India and Burma; 1944–1945	Succeeded by The Earl of Scarbrough
Preceded by Harry Crookshank	Postmaster General; 1945–1947	Succeeded by Wilfred Paling
Preceded by Edward Williams	Minister of Information; 1946	Succeeded by Office abolished
Preceded by The Lord Pethick-Lawrence	Secretary of State for India and Burma; April–August 1947	Succeeded by Office abolished
Preceded by New office	Secretary of State for Burma; August 1947 – January 1948	Succeeded by Office abolished
Preceded by New office	Minister of State for Colonial Affairs; 1948–1950	Succeeded by John Dugdale
Preceded by George Brown	Joint Parliamentary Secretary to the Ministry of Agriculture and Fisheries; 1950–1951	Succeeded by Arthur Champion
Government offices
Preceded by Charles Noble Arden-Clarke	Governor-General of Ghana; 1957–1960	Succeeded by Office abolished and replaced by the President of Ghana
Honorary titles
Preceded by The Lord Balfour of Inchrye	Senior Privy Counsellor; 1988–1997; With: The Lord Shawcross	Succeeded by The Lord Shawcross
Peerage of Ireland
Preceded by Richard Hare	Earl of Listowel; 1931–1997	Succeeded by Francis Michael Hare
