= Ballyhooly =

Village in County Cork, Ireland

Ballyhooly Baile Átha hÚlla
- Village
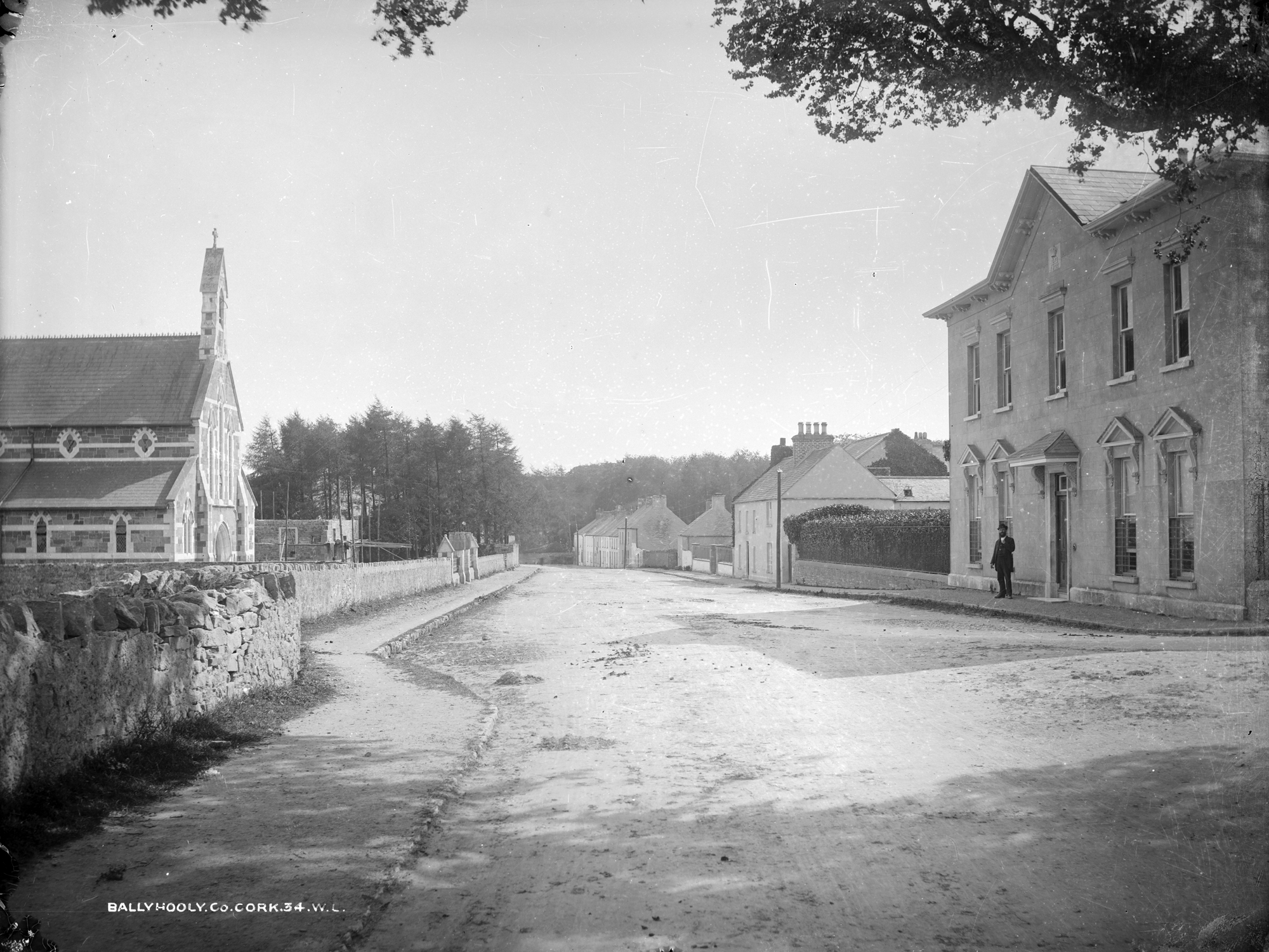
- Ballyhooly village c.1880
- Nickname: fort of the apples
- Location in Ireland
- Coordinates: 52°09′N 8°24′W
- Country: Ireland
- Province: Munster
- County: County Cork

Population (2016)
  - Total: 475
- Time zone: UTC+0 (WET)
  - Summer (DST): UTC-1 (IST (WEST))

Ballyhooly (Irish: Baile Átha hÚlla, meaning 'town of the ford of the apples') is a small village and civil parish in north County Cork, Ireland. It is situated along the N72 between Castletownroche and Fermoy. Ballyhooly is home to two pubs, a church, a community centre and a petrol station with a shop. During the Celtic tiger, several housing estates were attached to the village. Ballyhooly is part of the Cork East Dáil constituency.

== History ==
Castle Ballyhooly, a 17th-century manor house outside of the town, was the site of a well-known skirmish during the Irish Civil War, known as the "Ballyhooly Massacre", despite the fact that only one person was killed. Ballyhooly is also the subject of the novel The Ghost of Ballyhooly by Betty Cavanna, which relates the story of a local girl who disappeared from the castle in the 1890s and was never found. Other books include The Ford of the Apples, which tells the story of the village.
