= John Hare, 1st Viscount Blakenham =

British politician (1911–1982)

The Right Honourable The Viscount Blakenham OBE PC DL
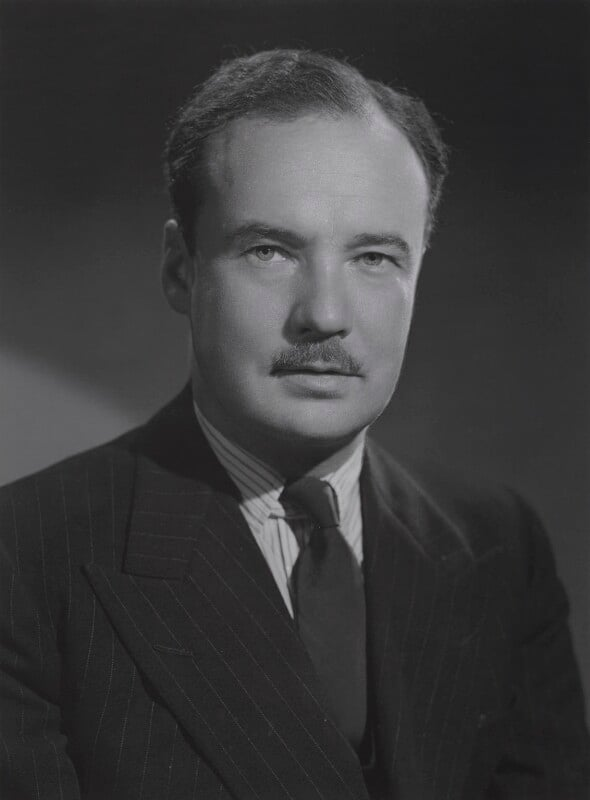
- Hare in 1949

Chairman of the Conservative Party
- In office 20 October 1963 – 28 July 1965
- Leader: Alec Douglas-Home
- Preceded by: Iain Macleod
- Succeeded by: Edward du Cann

Deputy Leader of the House of Lords
- In office October 1963 – October 1964
- Monarch: Elizabeth II
- Prime Minister: Alec Douglas-Home
- Leader: The Lord Carrington
- Succeeded by: The Lord Champion

Chancellor of the Duchy of Lancaster
- In office 20 October 1963 – 18 October 1964
- Monarch: Elizabeth II
- Prime Minister: Alec Douglas-Home
- Preceded by: Iain Macleod
- Succeeded by: Douglas Houghton

Minister of Labour
- In office 27 July 1960 – 20 October 1963
- Monarch: Elizabeth II
- Prime Minister: Harold Macmillan
- Preceded by: Edward Heath
- Succeeded by: Joseph Godber

Minister of Agriculture, Fisheries and Food
- In office 6 January 1958 – 27 July 1960
- Monarch: Elizabeth II
- Prime Minister: Harold Macmillan
- Preceded by: Derick Heathcoat-Amory
- Succeeded by: Christopher Soames

Secretary of State for War
- In office 18 October 1956 – 6 January 1958
- Monarch: Elizabeth II
- Prime Minister: Anthony Eden; Harold Macmillan
- Preceded by: Antony Head
- Succeeded by: Christopher Soames

Member of Parliament for Sudbury and Woodbridge Woodbridge (1945–1950)
- In office 5 July 1945 – 5 December 1963
- Preceded by: Walter Ross-Taylor
- Succeeded by: Keith Stainton

Personal details
- Born: John Hugh Hare; 22 January 1911 London, England
- Died: 7 March 1982 (aged 71) London, England
- Party: Conservative
- Spouse: Nancy Pearson (m. 1934)
- Children: 3, including Michael
- Parent: Richard Hare, 4th Earl of Listowel (father)

John Hugh Hare, 1st Viscount Blakenham (22 January 1911 – 7 March 1982) was a British Conservative politician.

== Background and education ==
Blakenham was born in London, the third son of The Rt. Hon. Richard Hare, 4th Earl of Listowel, an Anglo-Irish aristocrat, and The Hon. Freda Vanden-Bampde-Johnstone. His elder brother, The 5th Earl of Listowel, was a prominent Labour politician. He was educated at Eton.

== Political career ==
Blakenham was an Alderman of London County Council between 1937 and 1952 and fought in the Second World War with the Suffolk Yeomanry in Italy and was awarded the Legion of Honour and appointed an OBE. He sat as Member of Parliament for Woodbridge between 1945 and 1950 and for Sudbury and Woodbridge between 1950 and 1963 and was vice-chairman of the Conservative Party between 1952 and 1955. He served under Sir Anthony Eden as Minister of State for the Colonies between 1955 and 1956 and under Eden and his successor, Harold Macmillan, as Secretary of State for War from 1956 to 1958.

He later held office under Macmillan as Minister of Agriculture, Fisheries and Food from 1958 to 1960 and Minister of Labour between 1960 and 1963. He was admitted to the Privy Council in 1955 and in 1963 he was elevated to the peerage as Viscount Blakenham, of Little Blakenham in the County of Suffolk. Blakenham then served under Alec Douglas-Home as Chancellor of the Duchy of Lancaster and Deputy Leader of the House of Lords from 1963 to 1964 and was chairman of the Conservative Party between 1963 and 1965.

== Family ==
Lord Blakenham married the Hon. Nancy Pearson, daughter of Weetman Pearson, 2nd Viscount Cowdray, on 31 January 1934. They had three children:

- Hon. Mary Anne Hare (b. 9 April 1936)
- Michael John Hare, 2nd Viscount Blakenham (25 January 1938 – 8 January 2018)
- Hon. Joanna Freda Hare (b. 27 July 1942)

In 1967, Joanna married American attorney and Harvard Law School professor Stephen Breyer; Breyer would be appointed a Circuit Judge on the United States Court of Appeals for the First Circuit in 1980 and a Justice of the Supreme Court of the United States in 1994.

Lord Blakenham died in London on 7 March 1982, aged 71, and was succeeded in the viscountcy by his only son, Michael. Lady Blakenham died in November 1994, aged 86.

== Horticultural interests ==
In 1951 he purchased a wood close to his home, to make a woodland garden. Over the following years he created glades and paths through the bluebells and planted many rare plants, and became known as the Blakenham Woodland Garden.

Hare received the Victoria Medal of Honour from the Royal Horticultural Society in 1974. In 1982 he became treasurer of the Society.

The Blakenham Woodland Garden was inherited by his son and is open to the public. On his death the wood was made into a charitable trust. His son, Michael Blakenham, a lifelong environmentalist has increased the stock of unusual specimens and has bought many rare including unnamed trees and shrubs from auctions at Royal Botanic Gardens, Kew.

Parliament of the United Kingdom
Preceded by Walter Ross-Taylor	Member of Parliament for Woodbridge; 1945–1950	Constituency abolished
New constituency	Member of Parliament for Sudbury and Woodbridge; 1950–1963	Succeeded by Keith Stainton
Political offices
Preceded by Antony Head	Secretary of State for War; 1956–1958	Succeeded by Christopher Soames
Preceded by Derick Heathcoat Amory	Minister of Agriculture, Fisheries and Food; 1958–1960	Succeeded by Christopher Soames
Preceded by Edward Heath	Minister of Labour; 1960–1963	Succeeded by Joseph Godber
Preceded by Iain Macleod	Chancellor of the Duchy of Lancaster; 1963–1964	Succeeded by Douglas Houghton
Unknown	Deputy Leader of the House of Lords; 1963–1964	Succeeded by The Lord Champion
Party political offices
Preceded by Iain Macleod	Chairman of the Conservative Party; 1963–1965	Succeeded by Edward du Cann
Peerage of the United Kingdom
New creation	Viscount Blakenham; 1963–1982	Succeeded by Michael Hare
