= Little Blakenham =

Village in Suffolk, England

Coordinates: 52.09633°N 1.07630°E

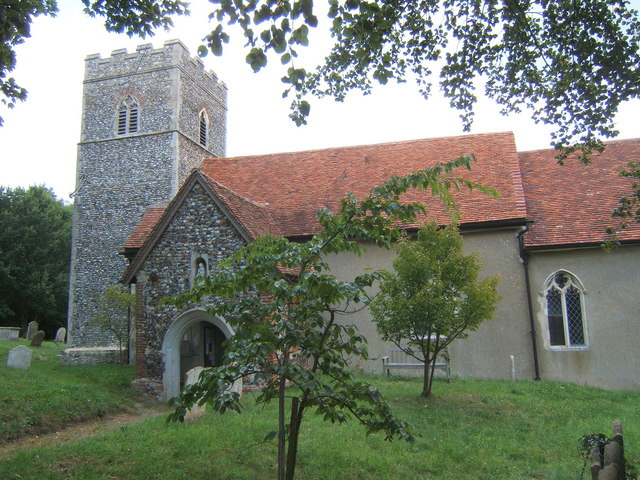
- Church of St Mary

- Location within Suffolk
- Population: 310 (2005); 295 (2011)
- District: Mid Suffolk
- Shire county: Suffolk
- Region: East
- Country: England
- Sovereign state: United Kingdom
- Post town: Ipswich
- Postcode district: IP8
- Police: Suffolk
- Fire: Suffolk
- Ambulance: East of England

Little Blakenham is a village and civil parish in the Mid Suffolk district of Suffolk in eastern England. Located around two miles north-west of Ipswich and a mile south-west of its larger sister village Great Blakenham, in 2005 its population was 310. The parish also contains the hamlets of Inghams and The Common.

The tiny village nestles at the base of gentle hillside. The church tower is visible for some distance, rising out of the trees. The parish is long and narrow, stretching some three miles from its south-western limit, not far from Flowton Church, to its north-eastern extremity, beside the River Gipping near Claydon. The Grade I listed church of St Mary The Virgin is set upon a grassy chalky bank beside a narrow lane, a little above the houses of its village and beside the former Rectory - a house with Dutch gables which stands at a considerably lower level. The east window of the church is a rare example in Suffolk of a stepped triple-lancet window of the late Early English period (c.1250-80). The congregation is supported from Bramford.

The village has its own version of an old carol, surviving the days when the churches standardised onto a common hymnal. Pete Jennings of BBC Radio Suffolk, and also Chairman of the Suffolk Pagan Society, found the words in a notebook started in 1891 by a folklorist called Charles Partridge. He was quoting Revd John Jackson of Little Blakenham, who had taken down the words from an aged parishioner. This had been published in "Suffolk Notes & Queries" No 121. Pete could not locate a version of the work locally, so researched at Cecil Sharp House in London, the headquarters of the English Folk Song And Song Society. The only thing Pete could find related to it was an Irish hymnal, which provided some similar verses and a tune, under the title "The Sinner's Redemption". Pete eventually offered the material to folk trio Artisan from Yorkshire. Enquiries by a former church organist uncovered the fact that a very similar version of the carol can easily be found in the New Oxford Book of Carols.
