= Great Blakenham =

Village in Suffolk, England

Coordinates: 52.114314°N 1.093623°E

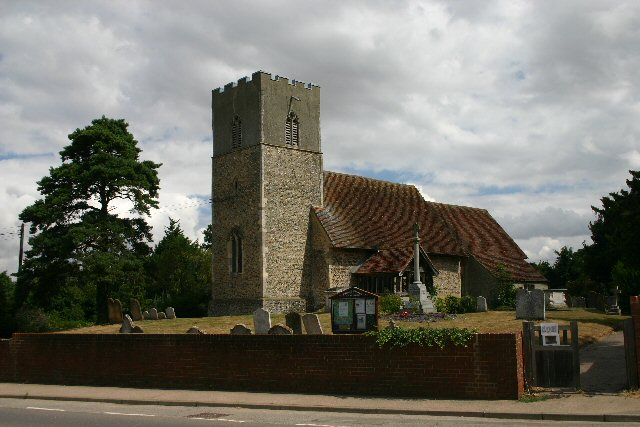
- Church of St Mary

- Location within Suffolk
- District: Mid Suffolk
- Shire county: Suffolk
- Region: East
- Country: England
- Sovereign state: United Kingdom
- Post town: Ipswich
- Postcode district: IP6
- Dialling code: 01473
- UK Parliament: Central Suffolk and North Ipswich

Great Blakenham is a village and civil parish in the Mid Suffolk district of Suffolk in eastern England located near the town of Ipswich.

An energy from waste Centre built by SITA UK was opened in December 2014 on the former site of the Highway Agency's Depot. All refuse from residential properties in Mid Suffolk and Babergh is sent here, No refuse goes to Landfill. .

A holiday centre, Valley Ridge, is planned to be built near Great Blakenham, following a series of plans initiated in 2004. As of 2021, new plans have been submitted and completion of the project is intended in 2024.
