= Evelyn Hill (cricketer) =

English cricketer (1907–1953)

Personal information
- Full name: Evelyn Vernon Llewellyn Hill
- Born: 18 April 1907; Cyntwell, Cardiff, Wales
- Died: 25 October 1953 (aged 46); Weston-super-Mare, Somerset, England
- Batting: Right-handed
- Bowling: Right-arm fast
- Role: Bowler
- Relatives: Father Vernon, brother Mervyn

Domestic team information
- Years: Team
- 1926–1929: Somerset
- First-class debut: 8 May 1926 Somerset v Worcestershire
- Last First-class: 26 July 1929 Somerset v Nottinghamshire

Career statistics
| Competition | First-class |
|---|---|
| Matches | 13 |
| Runs scored | 134 |
| Batting average | 16.75 |
| 100s/50s | –/– |
| Top score | 32 |
| Balls bowled | 1830 |
| Wickets | 33 |
| Bowling average | 32.03 |
| 5 wickets in innings | 2 |
| 10 wickets in match | – |
| Best bowling | 5/36 |
| Catches/stumpings | 9/– |
- Source: CricketArchive, 25 January 2011

Evelyn Vernon Llewellyn Hill (18 April 1907 – 25 October 1953) played first-class cricket for Somerset from 1926 to 1929. He was born at Cyntwell, Cardiff, Wales and died at Weston-super-Mare, Somerset.

== Family and background ==
Evelyn Hill's father was the Somerset and Oxford University cricketer Vernon Hill, who had moved back to south Wales to practise as a lawyer in the late 1890s. Vernon Hill's own father, Sir Edward Stock Hill, had a career that similarly straddled the Severn Estuary, with business interests and his home in Cardiff, but acting as Member of Parliament for Bristol South from 1886 to 1900. Evelyn's older brother, Mervyn Hill, played cricket for Somerset, Glamorgan and Cambridge University between 1921 and 1932.

== Cricket career ==
Hill was a lower-order right-handed batsman and a right-arm fast bowler. He was educated at Eton College where in 1925 he took seven Winchester College first-innings wickets for 53 runs and was, according to Wisden Cricketers' Almanack, the team's "greatest potential match-winner", though he was rated as inconsistent: "He does bowl fast and he does make the ball bounce, though as yet he lacks strength and stamina," it wrote, recommending that Oxford University take an interest in him when he went there after his school career was over. It is not clear whether Hill ever did go to Oxford: at the start of the 1926 cricket season, he was in the Somerset side for two matches, with a third in mid-June. In these matches he was more successful as a batsman than as a bowler. Against Middlesex at Lord's he made 32 of a last-wicket partnership of 59 with George Hunt and this was to be his highest first-class score. And in the June game he almost matched this by hitting an unbeaten 30 against Hampshire.

Early in 1927, Hill joined the Territorial Army, where his induction record as a second lieutenant mentions his previous service only in terms of his membership of the officer training corps at Eton, suggesting he had not gone to Oxford University. In the 1927 cricket season, Hill played three further matches for Somerset and in the second of these, against Derbyshire at Taunton he finally made an impression as a bowler, taking four wickets for 98 runs in Derbyshire's first innings. He then improved on this in 1928, his best season, by taking five Worcestershire wickets for 36 in the match at Stourbridge, the best return of his career. In his next Somerset match, against Surrey at Taunton, Hill took five for 85 in Surrey's first innings. But just a week later he broke down in the match against Sussex at Hove. He returned for one final first-class match in 1929 but was not successful.

== Military career ==
Hill joined the Territorial Army's Somerset Light Infantry unit and was promoted from second lieutenant to full lieutenant in February 1930. He resigned his commission in 1933. He returned to his rank as a lieutenant on the outbreak of the Second World War in September 1939. By the time he next relinquished his commission in September 1952, he had reached the rank of Major (Honorary Lieutenant-Colonel) and was allowed to keep the rank of lieutenant-colonel in retirement.
