= Minister of State for Health (Secondary Care) =

UK minister

United Kingdom Minister of State for Health (Secondary Care)
- Royal Arms of His Majesty's Government

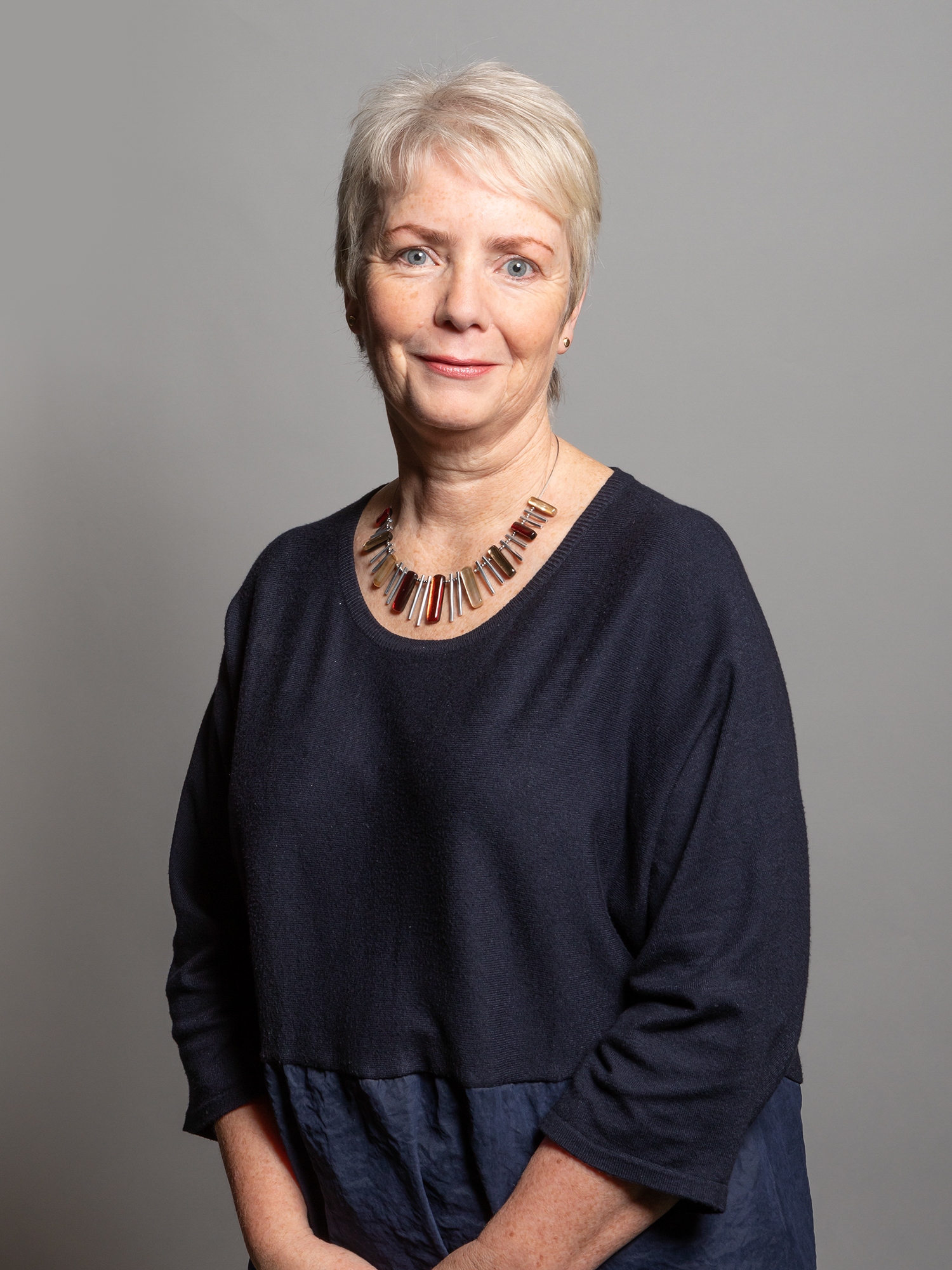
- Incumbent; Karin Smyth since 8 July 2024
- Department of Health and Social Care
- Style: Minister
- Nominator: Prime Minister of the United Kingdom
- Appointer: The Monarch; on advice of the Prime Minister
- Term length: At His Majesty's pleasure
- Formation: 1970
- First holder: Morys Bruce, 4th Baron Aberdare
- Website: www.gov.uk/government/ministers/minister-of-state--237

The Minister of State for Health (Secondary Care) is a mid-level position in the Department of Health and Social Care in the British government. The position is currently held by Karin Smyth MP since 8 July 2024. The minister often deputises for the Secretary of State for Health and Social Care alongside the Minister of State for Social Care.

The role was part of the Department for Health and Social Security under the Secretary of State for Social Services until 1988.

== Responsibilities ==
The minister is responsible for the following:

- COVID-19:
  - NHS resilience (acute capacity)
  - supply (ventilators)
- NHS operational performance
- Long Term Plan Bill
- finance, efficiency and commercial
- NHS capital, land and estates
- transformation
- NHS England mandate
- devolved administrations, Crown Dependencies and Overseas Territories
- secondary legislation
- departmental management
- EU future relationship and trade
- sponsorship of:
  - NHSE
  - NHSI

== List of ministers of state for health ==
Name	Portrait	Took office	Left office	Political party	Prime Minister
Role created out of the Department of Health and Social Security
Minister of State for Health and Social Security
Morys Bruce; 4th Baron Aberdare		23 June 1970	8 January 1974	Conservative	Edward Heath (I)
Brian O'Malley MP for Rotherham		8 March 1974	6 April 1976	Labour	Harold Wilson (III) + (IV)
David Owen MP for Plymouth Devonport		26 July 1974	10 September 1976	Labour	Harold Wilson (III) + (IV)
Stan Orme MP for Salford West		8 April 1976	4 May 1979	Labour	James Callaghan (I)
Roland Moyle MP for Lewisham East		10 September 1976	4 May 1979	Labour	James Callaghan (I)
Minister of State for Health
Gerard Vaughan MP for Reading South		7 May 1979	5 March 1982	Conservative	Margaret Thatcher (I)
Kenneth Clarke MP for Rushcliffe, Nottinghamshire		5 March 1982	2 September 1985	Conservative	Margaret Thatcher (I) + (II)
Barney Hayhoe MP for Brentford and Isleworth		2 September 1985	10 September 1986	Conservative	Margaret Thatcher (II)
Tony Newton MP for Braintree		10 September 1986	25 July 1988	Conservative	Margaret Thatcher (II) + (III)
David Mellor MP for Putney		25 July 1988	27 October 1989	Conservative	Margaret Thatcher (III)
Anthony Trafford; Baron Trafford		29 July 1989	16 September 1989	Conservative	Margaret Thatcher (III)
Virginia Bottomley MP for South West Surrey		28 October 1989	10 April 1992	Conservative	Margaret Thatcher (III) John Major (I)
Brian Mawhinney MP for Peterborough		14 April 1992	20 July 1994	Conservative	John Major (II)
Gerry Malone MP for Winchester		20 July 1994	May 1997	Conservative	John Major (II)
Minister of State for Health Services
Alan Milburn MP for Darlington		May 1997	30 December 1998	Labour	Tony Blair (I)
John Denham MP for Southampton Itchen		30 December 1998	11 June 2001	Labour	Tony Blair (I)
Jacqui Smith MP for Redditch		June 2001	June 2003	Labour	Tony Blair (II)
Rosie Winterton MP for Doncaster Central		June 2003	May 2005	Labour	Tony Blair (II)
John Hutton MP for Barrow and Furness		June 2003	May 2005	Labour	Tony Blair (II)
Minister of State for Quality and Patient Safety
Jane Kennedy MP for Liverpool Wavertree		10 May 2005	8 May 2006	Labour	Tony Blair (III)
Minister of State for Delivery and Reform
Andy Burnham MP for Leigh		8 May 2006	28 June 2007	Labour	Tony Blair (III)
Minister of State for Health Services
Ben Bradshaw MP for Exeter		28 June 2007	5 June 2009	Labour	Gordon Brown (I)
Mike O'Brien MP for North Warwickshire		8 June 2009	11 May 2010	Labour	Gordon Brown (I)
Simon Burns MP for Chelmsford		12 May 2010	4 September 2012	Conservative	David Cameron (Coalition)
Parliamentary Under-Secretary of State for Health Services
Dan Poulter MP for Central Suffolk and North Ipswich		4 September 2012	12 May 2015	Conservative	David Cameron (Coalition)
Ben Gummer MP for Ipswich		12 May 2015	14 July 2016	Conservative	David Cameron (II)
Minister of State for Health
Philip Dunne MP for Ludlow		15 July 2016	9 January 2018	Conservative	Theresa May (I) + (II)
Steve Barclay MP for North East Cambridgeshire		9 January 2018	16 November 2018	Conservative	Theresa May (II)
Stephen Hammond MP for Wimbledon		16 November 2018	25 July 2019	Conservative	Theresa May (II) Boris Johnson (I)
Chris Skidmore MP for Kingswood		24 July 2019	10 September 2019	Conservative	Boris Johnson (I)
Edward Argar MP for Charnwood		10 September 2019	6 July 2022	Conservative	Boris Johnson (I) + (II)
Maria Caulfield MP for Lewes		7 July 2022	7 September 2022	Conservative	Boris Johnson (II)
Will Quince MP for Colchester		8 September 2022	26 October 2022	Conservative	Liz Truss (I)
Minister of State for Health and Secondary Care
Will Quince MP for Colchester		26 October 2022	13 November 2023	Conservative	Rishi Sunak (I)
Andrew Stephenson MP for Pendle		13 November 2023	5 July 2024	Conservative	Rishi Sunak (I)
Karin Smyth MP for Bristol South		8 July 2024	Incumbent	Labour	Keir Starmer (I) Andy Burnham (I)

== See also ==
- Health minister
