= Mervyn Hill =

British cricketer (1902–1948)

Personal information
- Full name: Mervyn Llewellyn Hill
- Born: 23 June 1902; Llandaff, Glamorgan, Wales
- Died: 27 February 1948 (aged 45); Westminster, London, England
- Batting: Right-handed
- Role: Wicketkeeper
- Relatives: Father Vernon, brother Evelyn

Domestic team information
- Years: Team
- 1921–32: Somerset
- 1923–24: Cambridge University
- 1923: Glamorgan
- First-class debut: 21 August 1920 Gentlemen of England v Combined Services
- Last First-class: 12 August 1932 Somerset v Indians

Career statistics
Competition	First-class
Matches	64
Runs scored	864
Batting average	13.09
100s/50s	–/3
Top score	60
Balls bowled	–
Wickets	–
Bowling average	–
5 wickets in innings	–
10 wickets in match	–
Best bowling	–
Catches/stumpings	57/32
- Source: CricketArchive, 2 September 2010

Mervyn Llewellyn Hill (23 June 1902 – 27 February 1948) was a Welsh first-class cricket wicketkeeper and batsman for Somerset between 1921 and 1932, and also appeared in matches for Glamorgan and Cambridge University. He was also a member of the Marylebone Cricket Club (MCC) team that toured India in 1926–27 and helped lay the foundation for India's entry into Test cricket.

Hill was born at Llandaff, Cardiff, Wales and died in Westminster, London.

== Family and background ==
Mervyn Hill's father was the Somerset and Oxford University cricketer Vernon Hill, who had moved back to south Wales to practise as a lawyer in the late 1890s. Vernon Hill's own father, Sir Edward Stock Hill, had a career that similarly straddled the Severn Estuary, with business interests and his home in Cardiff, but acting as Member of Parliament for Bristol South from 1886 to 1900. Mervyn's brother, Evelyn Hill, played cricket for Somerset in 13 matches between 1926 and 1929.

== Cricket career ==
Hill was educated at Eton College and played in the 1920 and 1921 Eton v Harrow cricket matches at Lord's as a lower-order right-handed batsman and wicketkeeper. In August 1920 he made his first-class cricket debut playing for a side called the "Gentlemen of England" against the Combined Services also at Lord's: he was not out 0 at the end of the first innings having batted at No 11 and out for 0 when he batted at No 1 in the second innings. He made his county debut for Somerset in a single match against Sussex in August 1921, scoring 1 and 0, and played another single match for Somerset in 1922, making 0 in his only innings against Leicestershire. By this stage, in five first-class innings he had made only one run.

Lack of batting prowess was evident in his cricket career at Cambridge too: he went up to Cambridge University in the autumn of 1921, studying at Pembroke College, and played in the Freshmen's trial match at the start of the 1922 cricket season, but made just one run in two innings. In 1923, he played in two trial matches and failed to score in all four innings (one of them not out). But he was given a single first-class match by Cambridge in 1923 and, after scoring his customary 0 (not out) in the first innings against Lancashire, he proceeded to unprecedented heights in the second innings by making 2. In the middle of the 1923 season, he turned out in three matches for Glamorgan and though he continued to bat at No 10 or No 11, he made runs: against Nottinghamshire he made 35, including 30 runs off two overs of bowling by fast bowler Frank Matthews. In 1924, he played in four matches for Cambridge University without success, and also returned for two games to Somerset.

Hill played fairly regular first-class cricket for Somerset in only two seasons, 1925 and 1926. In 1925, he played in 18 matches for the county and was also picked for the Gentlemen v Players game at The Oval, sharing a last-wicket partnership of 48 with Gubby Allen after Allen and Nigel Haig had put on 193 for the ninth wicket. For much of the 1925 season, Hill batted at No 11 for Somerset, but elevation to No 10 in the match against Cambridge University at Bath brought him a personal best score of 46 and a share in a ninth wicket partnership of 103 that more than doubled Somerset's total.

Hill was the wicketkeeper for the match between Somerset and Surrey in August 1925 when Jack Hobbs first equalled and then beat W. G. Grace's record of 126 first-class centuries. An article on the website www.cricinfo.com in 2008 says that Hill had the opportunity to stump Hobbs when the Surrey batsman had reached 97 in pursuit of his second century of the match: "He danced down the pitch, missed the ball but Mervyn Hill failed – or chose not to – complete the stumping."

The 1926 season was Hill's best with the bat and against Gloucestershire at Taunton, batting at No 10, he hit 60 in "just over half an hour", with two sixes and 10 fours and including 18 off a single over from Charles Parker. In the next match, against Hampshire at Portsmouth, he did it again, making exactly 50 from the exalted position of No 9. And later in the 1926 season, though Hill had by then resumed his usual position at the end of the Somerset batting line-up, there was a third score of more than 50 – an innings of 53 that formed the bulk of a last-wicket partnership of 76 with George Hunt in the match against Derbyshire at Bath. The three 50s in 1926 were the only innings of more than 50 in Hill's career.

== MCC tour of India ==
Apart from the single Gentlemen v Players appearance, Hill's only taste of representative cricket came on an arduous tour of India made by the Marylebone Cricket Club from October 1926 to February 1927. The tour was billed as a visit to India and Ceylon (Sri Lanka), but matches were also played in the territories now inside the borders of Pakistan, Bangladesh and Myanmar (Burma). The team was led by the former England captain Arthur Gilligan and contained a mixture of Test and county standard players, both amateur and professional. Hill was one of two wicketkeepers: the other was George Brown of Hampshire. Both wicketkeepers fell ill on the tour, and Hill played no matches for six weeks in the middle of the tour. Arthur Dolphin of Yorkshire who was coaching in India for the Maharaja of Patiala, was co-opted for some matches when neither Hill nor Brown was fit (as was Maurice Leyland, also working for the Maharaja, to cover other illnesses). Hill played in little more than a third of the 26 first-class matches on the tour – some of them were of only two-days duration but only the single-innings games were not considered first-class – but stayed for the whole tour, which was rated a success by the MCC and was a factor that led to the entry of India into Test cricket.

== Later cricket career ==
The Indian tour marked virtually the end of Hill's cricket career. For the 1927 season, Somerset gave a full-time contract to the professional wicketkeeper, Wally Luckes, and Hill appeared in only three further first-class matches, one each in 1927, 1928 and 1932.
