= Howell Davies (politician) =

Welsh leather merchant and politician (1851–1932)

Howell Davies

Sir William Howell Davies (13 December 1851 – 26 October 1932) was a Welsh-born leather merchant and Liberal Party politician.

== Family ==
Davies was born in Narberth in Pembrokeshire, the son of Thomas Davies. He was educated privately. In 1882 he married Ada Mary Hosegood, the daughter of a Bristol Justice of the Peace. Lady Davies died in 1948 at the age of 91. They had one son and three daughters. Their son was Lt-Col. Owen Stanley Davies DSO who died in 1926 of wounds he received in the Great War, having undergone many operations. Their great-grandson is the writer Antony Woodward. By religion Davies was a Wesleyan Methodist.

== Business ==
Davies moved to Bristol and established himself in the leather trade, eventually becoming a highly successful tannery owner and leather merchant employing a large workforce. He also acquired directorships and was a Director of the UK Temperance and General Provident Institution.

== Local politics ==
Like many successful Victorian and Edwardian businessmen, Davies was eager to serve his community through municipal politics and at the same time provide himself a stepping-stone to further advancement. He first joined Bristol City Council in 1884 and was made an Alderman in 1889. He was elected Mayor of Bristol in 1896. He served for a time as Leader of the Liberal Party on Bristol City Council and was sometime President of the Chamber of Commerce. During his time on the Council Davies acquired extensive Municipal experience being Chairman of Bristol Docks Committee between 1899 and 1908 and was Chairman during the construction of, and at the time of the opening of the Royal Edward Dock which was formally opened by King Edward VII in July 1908. Davies was also Chairman of Bristol Finance Committee, 1902–29. For more than 46 years Davies took a leading role in political life of the city of Bristol and in 1908 he was knighted for municipal services in the King's birthday honours list.

== Parliamentary politics ==
Davies first stood for Parliament at the general election of 1900, the so-called Khaki election. He had been adopted as the Liberal candidate for Bristol South before the sitting MP (Sir Edward Stock Hill) had decided to retire. His Conservative opponent was Walter Hume Long.

Long won that election and even though the political tide had turned decisively against them by the time of the 1906 general election the Conservatives believed they would hold Bristol South, evenly if only narrowly. However Bristol South was one of many unexpected gains for the Liberals in their 1906 general election landslide victory. The Liberals took three of the four Bristol seats at the election and as late as 14 January, Liberal Chief Whip, Herbert Gladstone had confidently expected Walter Long to hold on in Bristol South. However Davies beat Long with a majority of 2,692 votes. He held the seat at the next election in January 1910 albeit by the narrow margin of 271 votes. As a consequence, Davies expected a hard-fought contest at the December 1910 election. Divisions in the Bristol Unionist ranks may have helped divert Tory attentions from the real fight. H Chatterton who had stood for the Conservatives in January 1910 was dropped by the Tories in favour of a different candidate and decided to put himself forward as an Independent Unionist, only withdrawing from the election at the last moment. In the end Davies was able to hold his seat over the new Conservative candidate J T Francombe with a majority of 138.

Davies never held ministerial office but he was appointed to the important Parliamentary Select committee on National Expenditure in 1920.

At the 1918 general election Davies was the representative of the Coalition government and was opposed only by Labour candidate Thomas Lewis, over whom he had a majority of 7,352 votes. He stood down from Parliament at the 1922 general election but continued to play a part in Liberal politics, representing the South West on the National Liberal Council.

== Death ==
Davies died at Bristol on 26 October 1932, aged 80.

Parliament of the United Kingdom
Preceded by Walter Long	Member of Parliament for Bristol South; 1906 – 1922	Succeeded by Beddoe Rees
