= Bristol Trades Council =

The Bristol Trades Council is a trades council representing workers in Bristol in England.

== History ==
The first attempt to form a trades council in Bristol was in 1868, when the Council of Amalgamated Trades was created. However, by the following year, this had become part of the Board of Trades Delegates, a group focused on encouraging workers to vote for the Liberal Party, and even this had dissolved by 1871.

By 1873, most large cities in the UK had a trades council, and in January, John Cawsey assembled a group of trade unionists at the Cock and Bottle pub on Castle Green, where they founded the Bristol Trades Council. Initially, fifteen craft unions were affiliated, but their total membership was less than 3,000, and this figure changed little until 1890. The focus on craft exclusiveness excluded unskilled workers. Despite this, and its early insistence on remain neutral between the Liberal and Conservative parties, it began featuring in the city's public life, for example, by nominating a member to a committee to investigate the position of the poor people in the city. In 1885, it founded a local Labour League, to support trade unionists standing for public office. This was immediately successful, as John Fox of the Bristol, West of England and South Wales Operatives Trade and Provident Society was elected to the School Board, while in 1887, R. G. Tovey was elected to Bristol City Council.

The new unionism of the 1890s was supported by the trades council, and many new unions affiliated during the 1890s, taking total membership to around 10,000. During this period, it supported a wide variety of industrial action, and convinced the city council to pay its workers at union rates. It affiliated to the Labour Representation Committee, and became the body organising Labour Party activity in Bristol until 1918. It suffered divisions during World War I, with Walter Ayles leading opposition to the war, while Frank Sheppard and William Whitefield led support for it. After extended debates, it decided to oppose conscription.

Although the Labour Party had split its political activity from trades councils in 1918, the following year, the trades council agreed to merge with the new Bristol Borough Labour Party, forming the Bristol Trades and Labour Council, with a full-time secretary for the first time. In 1921, it created the Bristol Unemployed Association to direct the existing movement of unemployed workers away from militant activity and towards joint campaigns with trades unions. Several other trades councils were inspired to create similar organisations, and in 1932 the Trades Union Congress took over responsibility as part of a national scheme modeled on the Bristol example.

The council co-ordinated local activity during the UK general strike, and although it had made no advance plans, its round-the-clock sessions and system of cycle messengers were deemed a success.

== Secretaries ==
as of 1878: George Fowler Jones
as of 1887: R. G. Tovey
1890: John Curle
to 1917: Thomas Lewis
1918:
1919: Edwin Parker
1942: E. V. Rees

== Presidents ==
1873: John Cawsey
1893: Frank Sheppard
as of 1931: A. W. Burgess
1944: G. Bullock
1946:
1949: G. Bullock
1951:
1952: Jessie Stephen
