= Central Suffolk =

UK Parliament constituency (1983–1997)

- Former county constituency for the House of Commons
- County: Suffolk

1983–1997
- Seats: One
- Created from: Eye, Ipswich and Bury St Edmunds
- Replaced by: Central Suffolk & North Ipswich, Bury St Edmunds

Central Suffolk was a county constituency in the county of Suffolk. It returned one Member of Parliament (MP) to the House of Commons of the Parliament of the United Kingdom.

== History ==
The constituency was created for the 1983 general election, primarily from the abolished county constituency of Eye, including the town of Stowmarket. It also included four wards from the north-western part of the Borough of Ipswich, transferred from the borough constituency thereof, and a small rural area to the west, equivalent to the former Rural District of Thedwastre, transferred from Bury St Edmunds.

It was in turn replaced by the Central Suffolk and North Ipswich constituency for the 1997 general election with a substantial area of the constituency, including Stowmarket, joining a reconfigured Bury St Edmunds constituency.

== Boundaries ==
- The District of Mid Suffolk; and
- The Borough of Ipswich wards of Broom Hill, Castle Hill, Whitehouse, and Whitton.

== Members of Parliament ==
Election	Member	Party
1983	Michael Lord	Conservative
1997	constituency abolished: see Central Suffolk and North Ipswich and Bury St Edmunds	

== Elections ==
=== Elections in the 1980s ===
General election 1983: Suffolk Central
Party	Candidate	Votes	%	±%
Conservative	Michael Lord	30,096	53.5	
Liberal	Nicholas Baldwin	15,365	27.3	
Labour	Diana Sierakowski	10,828	19.2	
Majority		14,731	26.2	
Turnout		56,289	74.4	
Conservative win (new seat)				

General election 1987: Suffolk Central
Party	Candidate	Votes	%	±%
Conservative	Michael Lord	32,422	53.7	+0.2
Liberal	Thomas Dale	16,132	26.7	−0.6
Labour	Mark Walker	11,817	19.6	+0.4
Majority		16,290	27.0	+0.8
Turnout		60,371	76.2	+1.8
Conservative hold		Swing	+0.4	

=== Elections in the 1990s ===
General election 1992: Suffolk Central
Party	Candidate	Votes	%	±%
Conservative	Michael Lord	32,917	49.6	−4.1
Liberal Democrats	Lesley Henniker-Major	16,886	25.4	−1.3
Labour	John Harris	15,615	23.5	+3.9
Green	John Matthissen	800	1.2	New
Natural Law	Julie Wilmot	190	0.3	New
Majority		16,031	24.1	−2.9
Turnout		66,408	80.3	+4.1
Conservative hold		Swing	−1.4	
