= Noel Lindsay =

British politician

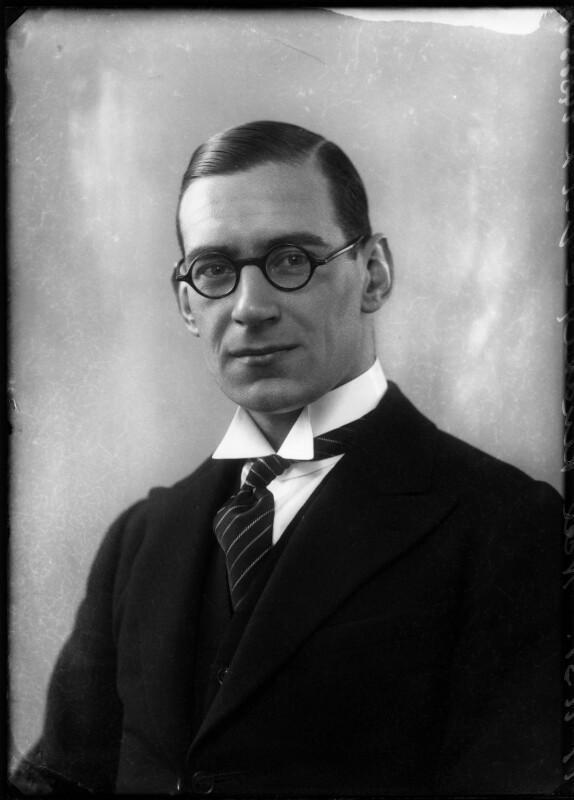
Lindsay in 1931

Noel Ker Lindsay (25 December 1904 – c. 1966) was a British barrister and Conservative Party politician.

Lindsay attended St Peter's School, York followed by Brasenose College, Oxford and became a member of the Bar (Gray's Inn).

He was elected as the member of parliament (MP) for Bristol South in the Conservative landslide at the 1931 general election. On 20 November 1934 he proposed the Queen's Speech in the House of Commons. He served until 1935 general election when the seat was taken by Labour. Since then, Bristol South has not elected a Conservative MP.

Lindsay served as an Army officer in the Royal Army Service Corps during the Second World War, and following the war, was appointed as Director of the British Non-Ferrous Metals Association at a salary of £5,000. In 1952, now living in Birmingham, he filed for bankruptcy, claiming that his financial affairs had been hopelessly complicated by what he agreed was an "extravagance of living". He had been advanced several thousand pounds in loans by foreign delegates at conferences, much of which had been sent to his wife, from whom he was separated. He was unable to pay his tax and surtax liabilities and owed £1,460 to his employers. In total, the claims against him came to over £3,700.

Following his bankruptcy, he disappeared from the public eye. He appears to have remained in London in reduced circumstances until at least 1957, but his life after that is unknown. He was discharged from his bankruptcy on 11 September 1966.

His name last appeared in the 1965 edition of Who's Who, but has not been included in any subsequent editions or in any edition of Who Was Who. His entry in "Who's Who of British MPs" by Stenton and Lees does not include the customary asterisk against all living former MPs, all of which implies that he died in around 1966.

Parliament of the United Kingdom
Preceded by Alexander Walkden	Member of Parliament for Bristol South; 1931–1935	Succeeded by Alexander Walkden
