= Beddoe Rees =

British politician and architect (1877–1931)

Beddoe Rees

Sir William Beddoe Rees (1877 – 12 May 1931), usually known simply as Beddoe Rees, was a Welsh architect, industrialist and Liberal politician.

== Family and education ==
Rees was born in Maesteg, Glamorganshire, the son of John Rees, also of Maesteg. Rees was the brother of Liberal politician and Judge Tudor Rees and the soldier, and Military Cross recipient Sir Frederick Tavinor Rees. He was educated privately and at the University of Wales. Rees was trained as an architect and published one of the few manuals on chapel architecture: 'Chapel building: hints and suggestions'. In 1925, he married Elizabeth, daughter of the late Robert Jones-Griffith, of Dolgellau in Merionethshire. They had one daughter, Rosemary, in May 1927 (died, Bath, Somerset 15 September 2009). In religion, Rees was a nonconformist eventually becoming Joint Treasurer of the National Free Church Council of England and sometime President of the National Free Church Council of Wales. The National Free Church Council has been described as the 'political arm' of nonconformity.

== Business ==
As an architect Rees designed many Welsh chapels before giving up his practice about the beginning of the First World War to become managing director of Welsh Garden Cities Ltd, the organisation which built garden villages in several of industrial valleys in South Wales. Rees built up extensive business interests becoming the chairman of a number of companies, mostly in the coal mining and related industries. These included Ashburnham Collieries, Ltd, Ashburnham Steamship and Coal Co. Ltd and North Amman Collieries. He was also a Director of Amalgamated Anthracite Collieries and Welsh Anthracite Collieries, Ltd.

== Knighthood ==
Rees was knighted in June 1917 for his work as chairman of Welsh Garden Cities Ltd, a commercial body, the most striking legacy of which in co-operation with other housing and town planning organisations, was the suburb of Rhiwbina in the north of Cardiff.

== Liberal candidate in Cannock ==
Rees first stood for Parliament as a Liberal at the 1918 general election in Cannock, Staffordshire. His opponent was a sitting MP and former Chief Whip of the Labour Party in the wartime coalition government, James Parker. Despite Labour having withdrawn from the Coalition to fight the election as an independent party, Parker announced that he was to remain at his post and would fight the election as Coalition candidate. Parker was one of a handful of Labour Party MPs to support the Coalition in the election and in some reports was described as a Liberal, although it is not completely clear if he received the government Coupon. After the election however he retained his job as a government whip being appointed one of the Lords Commissioners of the Treasury.

== MP for Bristol South ==
After the disappointment of Cannock, Rees found a political home in Bristol. Despite being opposed by a coalition candidate in Cannock, Rees was a natural supporter of the Lloyd George coalition. He was typical of the backbench Coalition Liberals of the period, many of whom were wealthy industrialists. On the backbenches the party was strongest in terms of bank balances rather than political expertise. His wealth, his position in industry, his fierce anti-socialism, all commended him to Conservatives as his nonconformity, his interest in Welsh national movements and his support for free trade made him attractive to Liberals. Bristol was a coalition stronghold, all five seats in the city being represented at the 1918 general election by parties and candidates supporting the coalition. The sitting Liberal MP for Bristol South, Sir William Howell Davies, who had represented the constituency since 1906, was retiring and Rees was selected to replace him. Despite the fall of the Lloyd George coalition following the vote of the Conservative Party at the Carlton Club, the Tories were reluctant to break the electoral arrangements in Bristol which ensured straight fights in all the seats against Labour to the benefit of their candidates and the Conservatives did not oppose Rees in his contest with D J Vaughan, the Labour man. Thus Rees was elected to Parliament at the 1922 general election with a majority of 3,459 votes.

Rees waited some months before making his maiden speech and chose a debate about miners' wages in which to make his first contribution. According to The Times newspaper it was an 'excellent maiden speech'. In the speech Rees opposed the Bill designed to establish a minimum wage for coal miners, arguing that its real outcome would be to create a great combine of mineworkers with an organisation capable of holding the country to ransom.

== The 1923 General Election ==
Rees, despite his public support for the traditional Liberal policy of Free Trade was not an ideological free-trader. He voted in Parliament for the Safeguarding of Industries Act and was in favour of some measure of protection for home markets, an attitude typical of the Bristol merchant class. Despite this, Rees took his stand as a free-trader again at the 1923 general election, presumably to enable him to benefit from the Liberal campaign nationally in support of free trade following Stanley Baldwin's calling of the election to gain a mandate for imposing tariffs. This approach allowed the Liberals to gain the votes of free-trade Conservatives while retaining their traditional support in rural seats. In Bristol South, Rees again had the full support of the local Conservative Association as well as the Liberals in his fight against the Labour candidate D J Vaughan on an avowedly anti-socialist ticket. It was a noisy and unpleasant campaign with meetings descending into violence. However Rees beat Vaughan by 15,235 to 13,701 – a majority of 1,534.

== Liberal divisions ==
As a Coalition Liberal, Rees was associated with support for Lloyd George. However, according to the historian Michael Bentley, by 1924 Rees was part of 'a small group of Liberal Imperialists' numbering about 12 MPs who were presumably beginning to be wary of some of Lloyd George's policy positions and his place on the political spectrum in relation to the emerging force of the Labour Party. Rees did later back Lloyd George however. His name was on a list of MPs sent to Lloyd George by Freddie Guest on 1 June 1926 with a promise of support for his leadership, as long as he would give an assurance that he would not enter into an alliance with Labour or support nationalisation of industry. Lloyd George's carefully worded reply was successful in ensuring the support of enough MPs for his continued leadership of the party. In the end Rees did not actually vote for Lloyd George as he was absent from the critical meeting of Parliamentary Liberal Party on 1 February 1926.

Nevertheless, Rees' association with the Conservatives brought him into conflict with his own party over the issue of support for the formation of a Labour government after the 1923 election. He was unable to support H. H. Asquith's position of allowing Labour to take office, although he told his electors in Bristol that there was no Liberal principle involved it was merely a matter of being true to the position on which he had fought the last election. He was one of ten Liberals to support Baldwin's attempt to remain in office. He then voted with the Conservatives on numerous occasions during the rest of the Parliament although he was rarely the only Liberal MP to defy the party line. The party was embarrassed by these divisions in their Parliamentary ranks but they were reaping the harvest of the Asquith–Lloyd George split and the problems which developed during Lloyd George's coalition with the Conservatives. Liberal unity did not really improve until after Asquith's death in 1928 and the need for the Liberal Party to reunify in the face of the 1929 general election. Rees' position was not always appreciated by the local Liberals either. At the end of July 1927 a deputation from the Western Liberal Federation went to see the Chief Whip at Liberal Party headquarters. They complained about the political conduct of Freddie Guest, the member for Bristol North and Beddoe Rees, because of the number of occasions they had voted with the Government against the rest of the members of the party. They requested that the whip should be withdrawn from them.

== 1924–1929 ==
By the time of the 1924 general election, Labour had become much more optimistic about doing well in Bristol and thought they would win against Rees. Rees against faced his usual Labour opponent D J Vaughan and the continuing local "pact" with the Unionists meant another straight fight. Despite Labour hopes, Rees held the seat by 16,722 votes to Vaughan's 15,702 – a reduced majority of 1,020.

The local arrangement with the Conservatives survived for the 1929 general election and again Rees had no Tory opponent. Again the result was expected to be close but in the end it was a comfortable win for the new Labour candidate Alexander Walkden who had a majority of 5,397. Vaughan had finally abandoned Bristol South and had accepted the offer to stand in the Labour seat of Forest of Dean where he was also elected.

== Bankruptcy and death ==
At the end of his life, Rees suffered a complete reversal of financial fortune with the failure of his financial affairs, and he was adjudged bankrupt on 24 July 1930, the debt involving many thousands of pounds. After two adjournments for illness Rees finally appeared for examination on 9 December 1930. He lodged accounts showing total liabilities of £415,951 against assets of £528. However, in March 1931 his debts were discharged, despite the objection of the Official Receiver that he had engaged in rash and hazardous speculation and unjustifiable extravagance in living. The Registrar of the Bankruptcy Court accepted that the depression in the Welsh coal industry had been out of Rees' control and that the state of the stock market meant other share dealings financed on borrowed monies provided no income in dividend. He also seemed to accept that Rees had been punished personally, in business and socially by the fact of his bankruptcy. Beddoe Rees died soon after these proceedings in May 1931.

== See also ==
- List of Liberal Party (UK) MPs

Parliament of the United Kingdom
Preceded by Howell Davies	Member of Parliament for Bristol South; 1922 – 1929	Succeeded by Alexander Walkden
