= Michael Lord =

British politician (born 1938)

The Right Honourable The Lord Framlingham
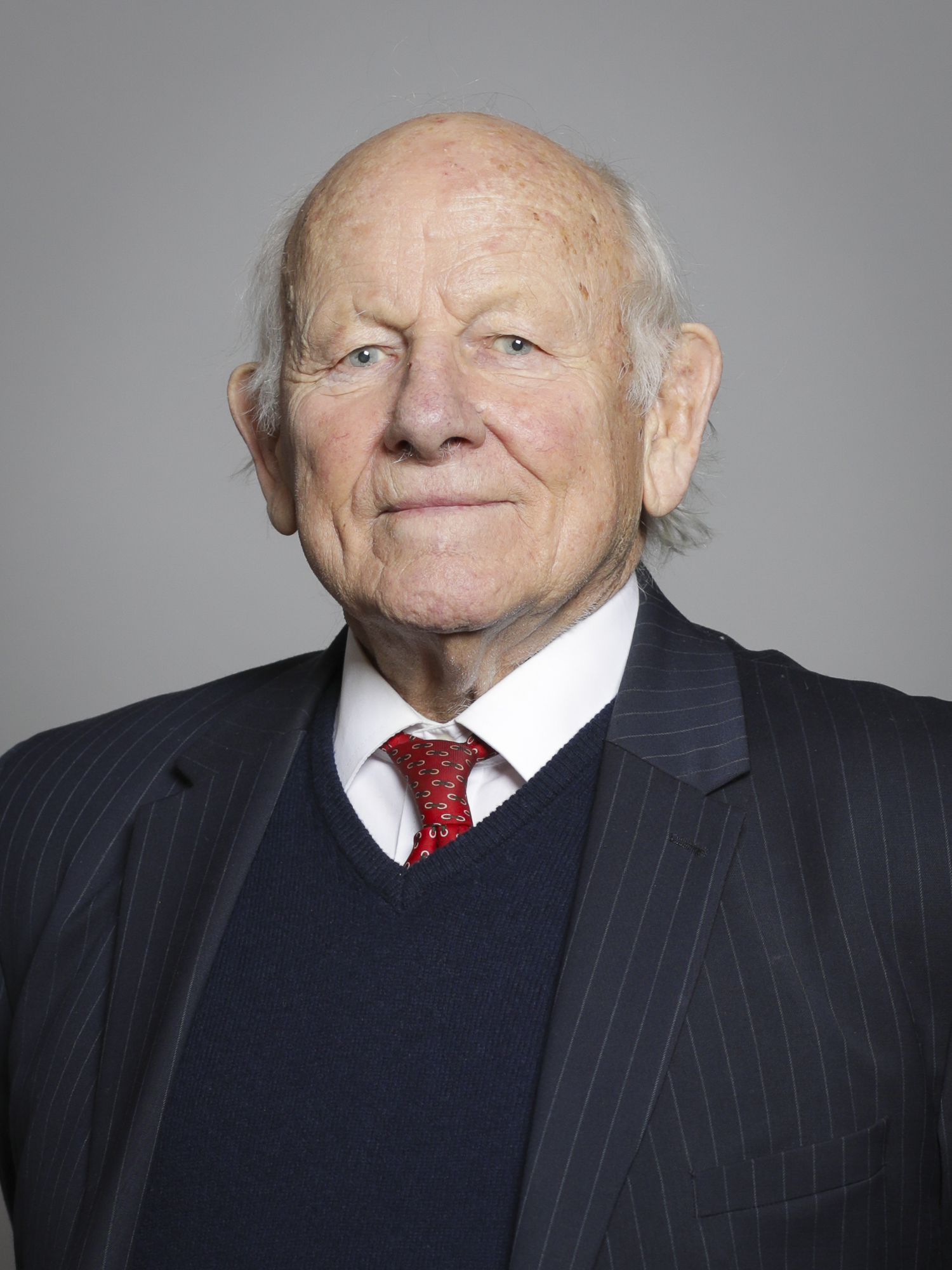
- Official portrait, 2019

Deputy Speaker of the House of Commons Second Deputy Chairman of Ways and Means
- In office 14 May 1997 – 8 June 2010
- Speaker: Betty Boothroyd; Michael Martin; John Bercow
- Preceded by: Dame Janet Fookes
- Succeeded by: Dawn Primarolo

Member of the House of Lords
- Lord Temporal
- Life peerage 14 January 2011

Member of Parliament Central Suffolk and North Ipswich Suffolk Central (1983–1997)
- In office 9 June 1983 – 12 April 2010
- Preceded by: new constituency
- Succeeded by: Dan Poulter

Personal details
- Born: Michael Nicholson Lord; 17 October 1938 (age 87) Manchester, England
- Party: Conservative
- Spouse: Jennifer Margaret Childs (m. 1965)
- Children: 2 (including Tim)
- Education: Christ's College, Cambridge

Michael Nicholson Lord, Baron Framlingham (born 17 October 1938) is a British politician, and was a Conservative Member of Parliament for Central Suffolk and North Ipswich between 1997 and 2010. He was first elected for the predecessor seat of Central Suffolk in 1983.

He was the Second Deputy Chairman of Ways and Means, one of the Deputy Speakers of the House of Commons, from 1997 to 2010.

== Early life ==
He attended Christ's College, Cambridge, where he gained an MA in agriculture in 1962 and a blue for rugby union as a centre. He also played club rugby for Bedford. He is a former president of the Arboricultural Association.

== Parliamentary career ==
He contested Manchester Gorton in 1979 and was first elected as an MP for Central Suffolk in 1983.

He was a Deputy Speaker of the House of Commons from 1997, and therefore did not take political stances or vote in the Chamber. Before his position, he was a eurosceptic who was one of the Maastricht Rebels. He was knighted in the 2001 Birthday Honours.

Lord did not seek re-election at the 2010 general election. On 19 November 2010, it was announced that he would be created a life peer and sit as a Conservative in the House of Lords. Created on 14 January 2011 and introduced into the House of Lords on 18 January 2011, he took the title Baron Framlingham, of Eye in the County of Suffolk. Though life peers usually use their surname in their title, Framlingham was advised he could not become "Lord Lord"; though this nickname has since been used occasionally in jest.

== Personal life ==
He married Jennifer Margaret Childs in 1965 and they have a son, Tim Lord, and a daughter.

Parliament of the United Kingdom
New constituency	Member of Parliament for Central Suffolk; 1983–1997	Constituency abolished
New constituency	Member of Parliament for Central Suffolk and North Ipswich; 1997–2010	Succeeded by Dan Poulter
Preceded by Dame Janet Fookes	Second Deputy Chairman of Ways and Means; 1997–2010	Succeeded by Dawn Primarolo
Orders of precedence in the United Kingdom
Preceded by The Lord Edmiston	Gentlemen; Baron Framlingham	Followed by The Lord Wood of Anfield
