= Michael Cocks =

British politician (1929-2001)

The Right Honourable The Lord Cocks of Hartcliffe

Shadow Chief Whip of the House of Commons
- In office 4 May 1979 – 23 October 1985
- Leader: James Callaghan; Michael Foot; Neil Kinnock
- Preceded by: Humphrey Atkins
- Succeeded by: Derek Foster

Chief Whip of the House of Commons Parliamentary Secretary to the Treasury
- In office 8 April 1976 – 4 May 1979
- Prime Minister: James Callaghan
- Preceded by: Bob Mellish
- Succeeded by: Michael Jopling

Member of Parliament for Bristol South
- In office 18 June 1970 – 18 May 1987
- Preceded by: William Wilkins
- Succeeded by: Dawn Primarolo

Member of the House of Lords
- Lord Temporal
- Life peerage 6 October 1987 – 26 March 2001

Personal details
- Born: Michael Francis Lovell Cocks; 19 August 1929 Leeds, England
- Died: 26 March 2001 (aged 71) Bristol, England
- Party: Labour
- Spouses: Janet Macfarlane (m. 1954; div. 1979); Valerie Davis (m. 1979)
- Children: 4
- Education: University of Bristol

Michael Francis Lovell Cocks, Baron Cocks of Hartcliffe, PC (19 August 1929 – 26 March 2001) was a British Labour Party politician. He was the member of parliament for Bristol South from 1970 to 1987, and was the Labour Party's chief whip from 1976 to 1985.

== Early life ==
Cocks was born in Leeds, and was educated at George Watson's College, Edinburgh, and Silcoates School, Wakefield. After obtaining a BSc at Bristol University he became a geography teacher and later lectured at Bristol Polytechnic.

== Political career ==
Cocks contested Bristol West in 1959 and South Gloucestershire in 1964 and 1966. He was Member of Parliament for Bristol South from 1970 until 1987, after being deselected as a candidate in 1986 and replaced by Dawn Primarolo, in a challenge from the left.

During his time in the House of Commons, Cocks served as a Labour whip in government and in opposition, being Chief Whip from 1976 to 1985.

Cocks was created a life peer on 6 October 1987, becoming Baron Cocks of Hartcliffe, of Chinnor in the County of Oxfordshire and served as vice-chairman of the BBC 1993–98.

He also served as Deputy Chairman of the London Docklands Development Corporation. As Government Chief Whip from 1976 to 1979 he had the task of ensuring Government majorities for a minority government.

== Personal life and legacy ==
Cocks married Janet Macfarlane, a nurse, in 1954. The couple had four children, Andrew, Helen, Sarah and David, before separating in 1977 and divorcing in 1979. He was married to Valerie Davis from 1979 until his death from a heart attack at Southmead Hospital in Bristol on 26 March 2001, at the age of 71.

Cocks is a major character in the play This House by James Graham. The play was first staged at the National Theatre in 2011, with Cocks played by Vincent Franklin.

== See also ==
- Deselection of Labour MPs

== Sources ==
- The Times Guide to the House of Commons, Times Newspapers Ltd, 1966, 1983 & 1987
- Leigh Rayment's Historical List of MPs
- "Obituary: Lord Cocks of Hartcliffe", The Guardian, 27 March 2001

Parliament of the United Kingdom
Preceded by William Wilkins	Member of Parliament for Bristol South; 1970–1987	Succeeded by Dawn Primarolo
Political offices
Preceded by Bob Mellish	Chief Whip of the Labour Party; 1976–1985	Succeeded by Derek Foster
Preceded by Bob Mellish	Parliamentary Secretary to the Treasury; 1976–1979	Succeeded by Michael Jopling
