= William Wilkins (British politician) =

British Politician

William Albert Wilkins CBE (17 January 1899 – 6 May 1987) was a British Labour Party politician.

Wilkins was a linotype operator for a Bristol newspaper and was President of the Bristol branch of the Typographical Association. He joined the Labour Party in 1922 and became a member of Bristol City Council in 1936, serving for ten years. During World War II, Wilkins served as a stoker in the Royal Navy (in which he had served 1917–19) on the Q-ships of the Irish coast.

Wilkins was elected Member of Parliament (MP) for Bristol South in 1945, serving until 1970. He became an assistant whip in 1947 and in 1950 a Lord Commissioner of the Treasury. He was appointed CBE in the 1965 New Year Honours.

Parliament of the United Kingdom
Preceded by Alexander Walkden	Member of Parliament for Bristol South; 1945 – 1970	Succeeded by Michael Cocks
