= Dawn Primarolo =

British Labour politician and life peer

The Right Honourable The Baroness Primarolo DBE PC
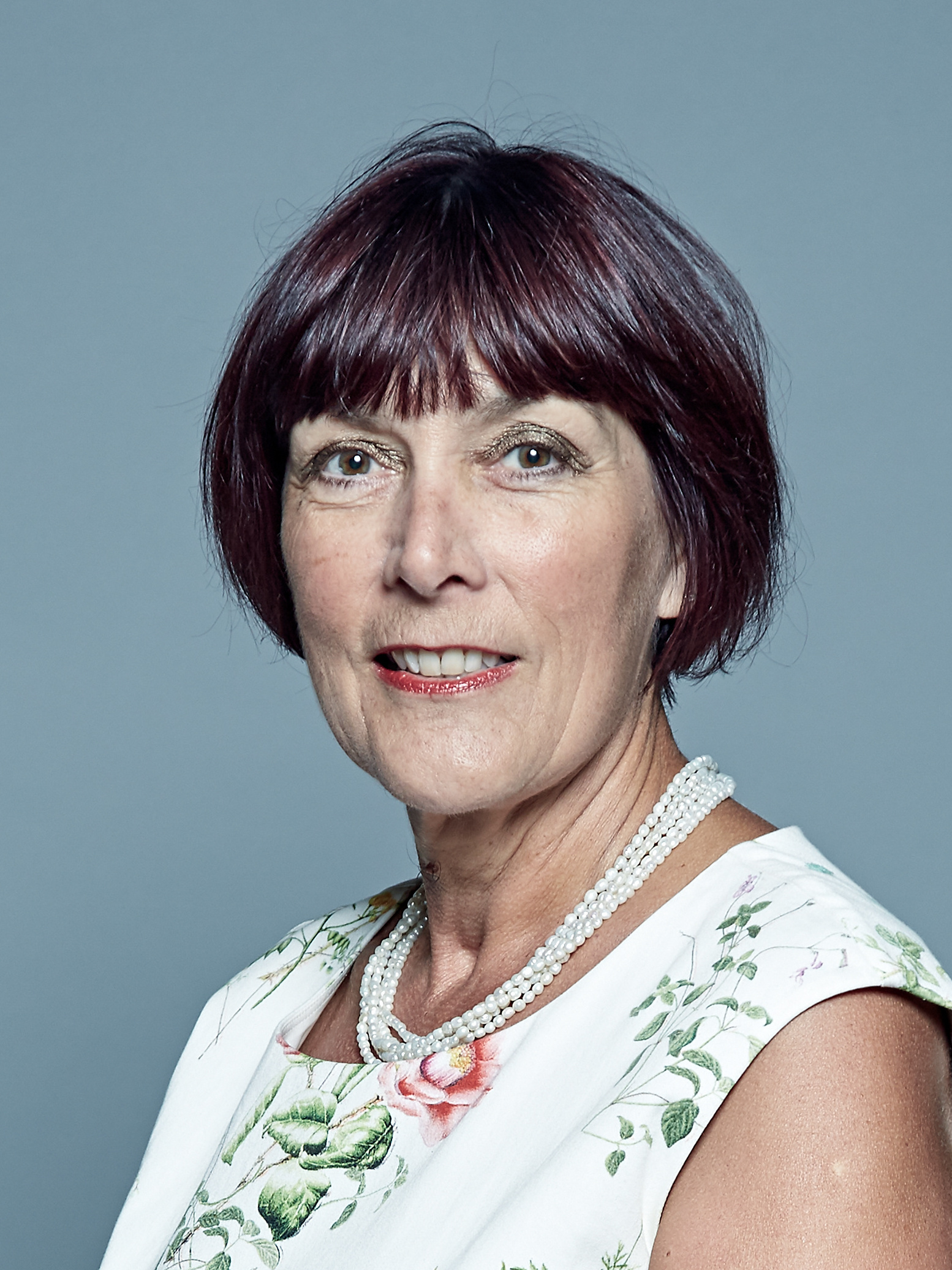
- Official portrait, 2018

Deputy Speaker of the House of Commons Second Deputy Chair of Ways and Means
- In office 9 June 2010 – 8 May 2015
- Speaker: John Bercow
- Preceded by: Michael Lord
- Succeeded by: Natascha Engel

Minister of State for Children, Young People and Families
- In office 5 June 2009 – 11 May 2010
- Prime Minister: Gordon Brown
- Preceded by: Beverley Hughes
- Succeeded by: Sarah Teather

Minister of State for Public Health
- In office 29 June 2007 – 5 June 2009
- Prime Minister: Gordon Brown
- Preceded by: Caroline Flint
- Succeeded by: Gillian Merron

Paymaster General
- In office 4 January 1999 – 28 June 2007
- Prime Minister: Tony Blair
- Preceded by: Geoffrey Robinson
- Succeeded by: Tessa Jowell

Financial Secretary to the Treasury
- In office 2 May 1997 – 4 January 1999
- Prime Minister: Tony Blair
- Preceded by: Michael Jack
- Succeeded by: Barbara Roche
Parliamentary offices
Member of the House of Lords
Lord Temporal
Life peerage 26 October 2015
Member of Parliament for Bristol South
In office 11 June 1987 – 30 March 2015
| Preceded by | Michael Cocks |
| Succeeded by | Karin Smyth |

Personal details
- Born: 2 May 1954 (age 72) London, England
- Party: Labour
- Spouse: Ian Ducat
- Education: Bristol Polytechnic; University of Bristol (did not graduate)

Dawn Primarolo, Baroness Primarolo, DBE, PC (born 2 May 1954) is a British Labour Party politician who was the Member of Parliament for Bristol South from 1987 until 2015, when she stood down. She was Minister of State for Children, Young People and Families at the Department for Children, Schools and Families from June 2009 to May 2010 and a Deputy Speaker of the House of Commons from 2010 to 2015. She was appointed Dame Commander of the Order of the British Empire (DBE) in the 2014 Birthday Honours for political service. She was nominated for a life peerage in the 2015 Dissolution Honours.

== Early life and career ==
Born in London, Primarolo was raised in Crawley, West Sussex, where she attended Thomas Bennett comprehensive school. She then studied at Bristol Polytechnic as a bookkeeper and legal secretary. Returning to London, in 1973 she joined the Labour Party whilst employed as a legal secretary in an east London Law Centre.

After marrying, she moved back to Bristol to raise her son. She then studied for a social science degree at Bristol Polytechnic, where she gained a BA (Hons). Whilst working, she then continued her studies at the University of Bristol, where she registered for a PhD research into women and housing. She did not finish the PhD, but was awarded an honorary doctorate by the university in 2016.

Becoming involved in her local community, Primarolo belonged to various women's groups and was active in the Campaign for Nuclear Disarmament, a founder member of Windmill Hill City Farm, and a school governor.

Active in her local Labour Party, in 1985 she was elected to Avon County Council, where she acted as vice chair of the Equal Opportunities Committee.

== Parliamentary career ==
Primarolo was first elected to Parliament at the 1987 general election, after the constituency party de-selected Michael Cocks, the sitting MP. She gained national attention in January 1989 by asking Margaret Thatcher at Prime Minister's Question Time if the only hope for low-paid women was "to follow her example and find themselves a wealthy husband". She was reading out a question on behalf of Ann Clwyd, who at the time had "lost her voice". Thatcher dismissed the question as 'cheap'. She served as opposition spokesperson for health from 1992 to 1994 and the Treasury from 1994 to 1997.

At the time she was first elected, Primarolo was considered to be on the hard left, but later became a New Labour loyalist, leading Andrew Roth of The Guardian to say she has "changed from 'Red Dawn' to 'Rosy Pink'"; As part of this change, she shifted from support for the Campaign for Nuclear Disarmament (CND), the rise of which originally led her into politics, to voting for the renewal of Britain's Trident nuclear deterrent.

Despite campaigning against the first Gulf War in 1991, she voted in favour of the Iraq War in 2003, and against any investigation into the invasion after it had taken place. On other 'key issues' (as described by TheyWorkForYou), she has voted in favour of ID cards and increased university tuition fees.

Primarolo served as Financial Secretary to the Treasury from 1997 to 1999 and as Paymaster General from 1999 to 2007. As Paymaster General, Primarolo was responsible for the administration of the working tax credit system, which was a system that contributed to raising millions of children out of poverty. However, the administration of this system received some criticism, including allegations that some families were left less well off as a result. In 2003, a Treasury select committee member accused her of "losing control of [her] department" after it became known that Inland Revenue buildings under Primarolo's purview had been sold to tax-haven companies. This came shortly after she had "insisted ... the Child tax credit scheme was a 'success'", despite Inland Revenue staff walking out in protest against the pressure under which they were placed. She was also responsible for introducing the controversial IR35 tax rules which were designed to tax "disguised employment" at a rate similar to employment. The measure was controversial as it was seen by some as unfair. Primarolo was also the longest serving Paymaster General in the office's 200-year history. Primarolo was named Chairman of the Code of Conduct Group upon its establishment by ECOFIN in March 1998.

In 2005, PM Tony Blair was forced to apologise after a report by the Parliamentary Ombudsman that Primarolo had failed to give Parliament accurate information. Primarolo admitted at the same time that she had been fully aware "about the extent of the problems".

As Minister of State for Public Health from 2007 to 2009, Primarolo was responsible for health improvement and health protection issues including such areas as tobacco, obesity, drugs and sexual health, as well as international business, pharmacy and research and development.

On 5 June 2009 Primarolo was moved, this time succeeding Beverley Hughes as Minister of State for Children, Young People and Families at the Department for Children, Schools and Families. This gave her the right to attend cabinet when her responsibilities were on the agenda.

Primarolo's abilities as a minister have been questioned, with former Prime Minister Tony Blair revealing in his autobiography A Journey that he did not think she was "right for government" but had to give her a job because she was one of Gordon Brown's key allies; and political commentator Danny Finkelstein arguing that she was "contender no. 1" for title of "Labour's worst Minister". Jonathan Powell, Blair's Chief of Staff, is reported as saying "We fired Dawn Primarolo about ten times. And each time Gordon (Brown) insisted we put her back."

=== Deputy Speaker ===
Primarolo joined the Shadow Cabinet as Shadow Minister for Children when Labour entered opposition in May 2010. In June 2010 she became a Deputy Speaker of the House of Commons. In November 2011 she announced her intention to stand down from Parliament at the next general election.

Primarolo was created a life peer taking the title Baroness Primarolo, of Windmill Hill in the City of Bristol on 26 October 2015.

=== 2022 Infected Blood Inquiry ===
In July 2022 Primarolo provided written evidence to the Infected Blood Inquiry. In September 2022 she provided spoken evidence.

== Personal life ==
Primarolo married UNISON regional secretary Ian Ducat in Bristol in 1990.

Parliament of the United Kingdom
| Preceded by Michael Cocks | Member of Parliament for Bristol South; 1987–2015 | Succeeded by Karin Smyth |
| Preceded by Michael Lord | Second Deputy Chair of Ways and Means; 2010–2015 | Succeeded by Natascha Engel |
Political offices
| Preceded by Michael Jack | Financial Secretary to the Treasury; 1997–1999 | Succeeded by Barbara Roche |
| Preceded by Geoffrey Robinson | Paymaster General; 1999–2007 | Succeeded by Tessa Jowell |
| Preceded by Caroline Flint | Minister of State for Public Health; 2007–2009 | Succeeded by Gillian Merron |
| Preceded by Beverley Hughes | Minister of State for Children, Young People and Families; 2009–2010 | Succeeded by Sarah Teather |
