= Frank Sheppard (trade unionist) =

British trade unionist and politician

Frank Sheppard CBE JP (29 December 1861 – 13 July 1956) was a British trade unionist and politician.

Probably born in Weston-super-Mare, Sheppard became an orphan when he was nine, and was fostered in Langford, undertaking an apprenticeship as a bootmaker. Once qualified, he moved to Bristol to find work, and became active in the National Union of Operative Boot and Shoe Riveters and Finishers. By 1884, he became the union's Bristol representative, and in 1893, he was elected as president of Bristol Trades Council.

In 1887, Sheppard joined the Social Democratic Federation, and he also served as honorary secretary of the Bristol Socialist Society. In 1893, he was elected to Bristol City Council as an independent labour representative for St Pauls, and was re-elected in 1904, serving until his death. He subsequently left the SDF and became prominent in the local Labour Party, standing unsuccessfully for Bristol East at the January 1910 general election. He supported British involvement in World War I, and worked with Ben Tillett to encourage trade unionist to enlist in the British Army.

Sheppard stood down from his trade union posts in 1913 and 1914, became the first Labour Lord Mayor of Bristol in 1917, and then spent much of his time as secretary of the Shirehampton Housing Utility Company, which constructed cheap but high-quality housing for workers. He was selected to stand as a Coalition Labour candidate in Bristol Central at the 1918 general election, but Ernest Bevin led a campaign to remove him, as Labour's official policy was not to participate in the coalition, and Bevin instead stood.

Sheppard was awarded the OBE in 1918 and CBE in the 1930 New Year Honours. He remained a Labour Party councillor and reconciled with Bevin; despite his earlier support for a coalition, he did not join the National Labour Organisation split. He served on the tribunal for conscientious objectors during World War II and remained politically active until shortly before his death, age of 94.

Civic offices
Preceded by Barclay Josiah Baron	Lord Mayor of Bristol; 1917	Succeeded by Henry William Twigs
