= Dan Poulter =

British politician (born 1978)

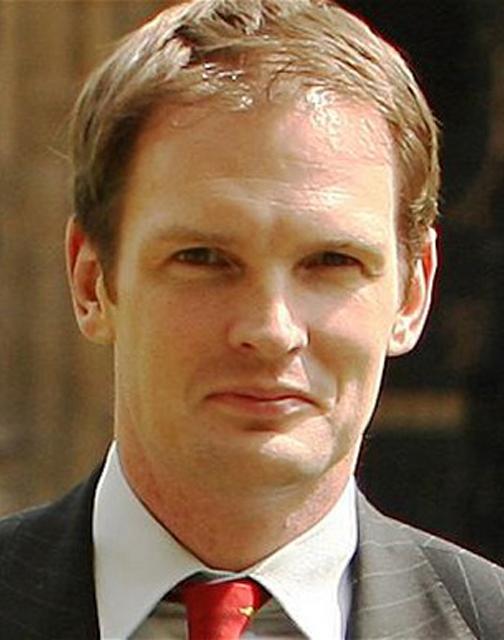
- Poulter in 2013

Parliamentary Under-Secretary of State for Health Services
- In office 4 September 2012 – 12 May 2015
- Prime Minister: David Cameron
- Preceded by: Simon Burns
- Succeeded by: Ben Gummer

Member of Parliament for Central Suffolk and North Ipswich
- In office 6 May 2010 – 30 May 2024
- Preceded by: Michael Lord
- Succeeded by: Patrick Spencer

Personal details
- Born: Daniel Leonard James Poulter; 30 October 1978 (age 47) Beckenham, London, England
- Party: Labour (since 2024)
- Other political affiliations: Conservative (until 2024)
- Education: University of Bristol (LLB); King's College London (MBBS)
- Website: www.drdanielpoulter.com

Daniel Leonard James Poulter (born 30 October 1978) is a British politician who served as the Member of Parliament (MP) for Central Suffolk and North Ipswich from 2010 to 2024. Poulter is a psychiatrist, and served as a Parliamentary Under-Secretary of State in the Department of Health between September 2012 and May 2015. Initially elected as a Conservative, he defected to Labour in April 2024.

== Early life and career ==
Daniel Poulter was born on 30 October 1978 in Beckenham, London. He was privately educated at Vinehall School and Battle Abbey School before attending the University of Bristol, graduating with a law degree, before qualifying as a medical doctor at King's College London.

Poulter was elected as a Conservative member of Hastings Borough Council in 2006, serving until 2007. He was the deputy leader of Reigate and Banstead Council between 2008 and 2010. Poulter worked as a junior doctor training in obstetrics and gynaecological medicine and has published articles in the area of women's health. At the time of meeting David Cameron in 2006, who inspired him to enter politics, he was working in mental health.

During the 2011 parliamentary summer recesses, Poulter worked at the James Paget University Hospital in Gorleston in Norfolk, in the Accident and Emergency department. In 2018, Poulter became a Member of the Royal College of Psychiatrists and continues to work as an NHS mental health doctor. In June 2021, Poulter became a non-executive director for Kanabo Group Plc, a medical cannabis company based in London.

== Parliamentary career ==
Poulter was elected as Member of Parliament (MP) for Central Suffolk and North Ipswich at the 2010 UK general election with 50.8% of the vote and a majority of 13,786.

In 2011, he was credited with a "lifesaving" intervention in Parliament when he persuaded fellow Conservative MP Guy Opperman to seek urgent medical treatment. Opperman subsequently had a brain tumour removed. Poulter resigned from the British Medical Association in 2012, following an announced doctors' strike. He said he did not believe "striking as a doctor could ever be justified". In September 2012, Poulter became the Parliamentary Under Secretary of State at the Department of Health. His primary responsibilities as a Health Minister were for workforce issues, NHS estates and IT systems.

At the 2015 UK general election, Poulter was re-elected as MP for Central Suffolk and North Ipswich, with an increased vote share of 56.1% and an increased majority of 20,144.

After the election, Poulter returned to the back benches, and restarted work part-time as a doctor. In October 2015, Poulter expressed his support for protests by doctors and others against the Conservative government's proposed changes to the junior doctors' contract.

In April 2016, Poulter widened his criticism of the Conservative government, in a Guardian article. Poulter was opposed to Brexit prior to the 2016 EU membership referendum. He later voted along party lines concerning leaving the EU.

At the snap 2017 UK general election, Poulter was again re-elected, with an increased vote share of 60.1% and a decreased majority of 17,185. He was re-elected at the 2019 UK general election, with an increased vote share of 62.7%, and an increased majority of 23,391.

In a March 2022 article penned by Poulter for the East Anglian Daily Times, he said "studies of healthy omnivores eating a diet rich in plant foods have failed to find consistent evidence that red meat is unhealthy". In December 2022, he wrote an article in The Guardian advocating for increasing nurses' pay during the 2022 National Health Service strikes.

On 27 April 2024, Poulter defected to the Labour Party, the second Conservative MP to defect to Labour during that parliament after Christian Wakeford crossed the floor in 2022. Poulter also declared that he would not be seeking re-election at the 2024 general election.

=== Sunday Times libel case ===
In February 2019, The Sunday Times apologised in open court to Dan Poulter for falsely alleging he had sexually assaulted three female MPs. The newspaper admitted the claims were defamatory and baseless, removed the articles from its website, and agreed not to republish them. It also paid substantial damages and covered Poulter's legal costs.

The allegations had appeared in two articles published in November 2017, based on claims by Andrew Bridgen MP. A Conservative Party investigation exonerated Poulter, finding no complaints had ever been made against him and dismissing the claims as lacking "reliable evidence."

Parliament of the United Kingdom
Preceded by Michael Lord	Central Suffolk and North Ipswich; 2010–2024	Succeeded by Patrick Spencer
