= Karin Smyth =

British politician (born 1964)

Karin Smyth MP
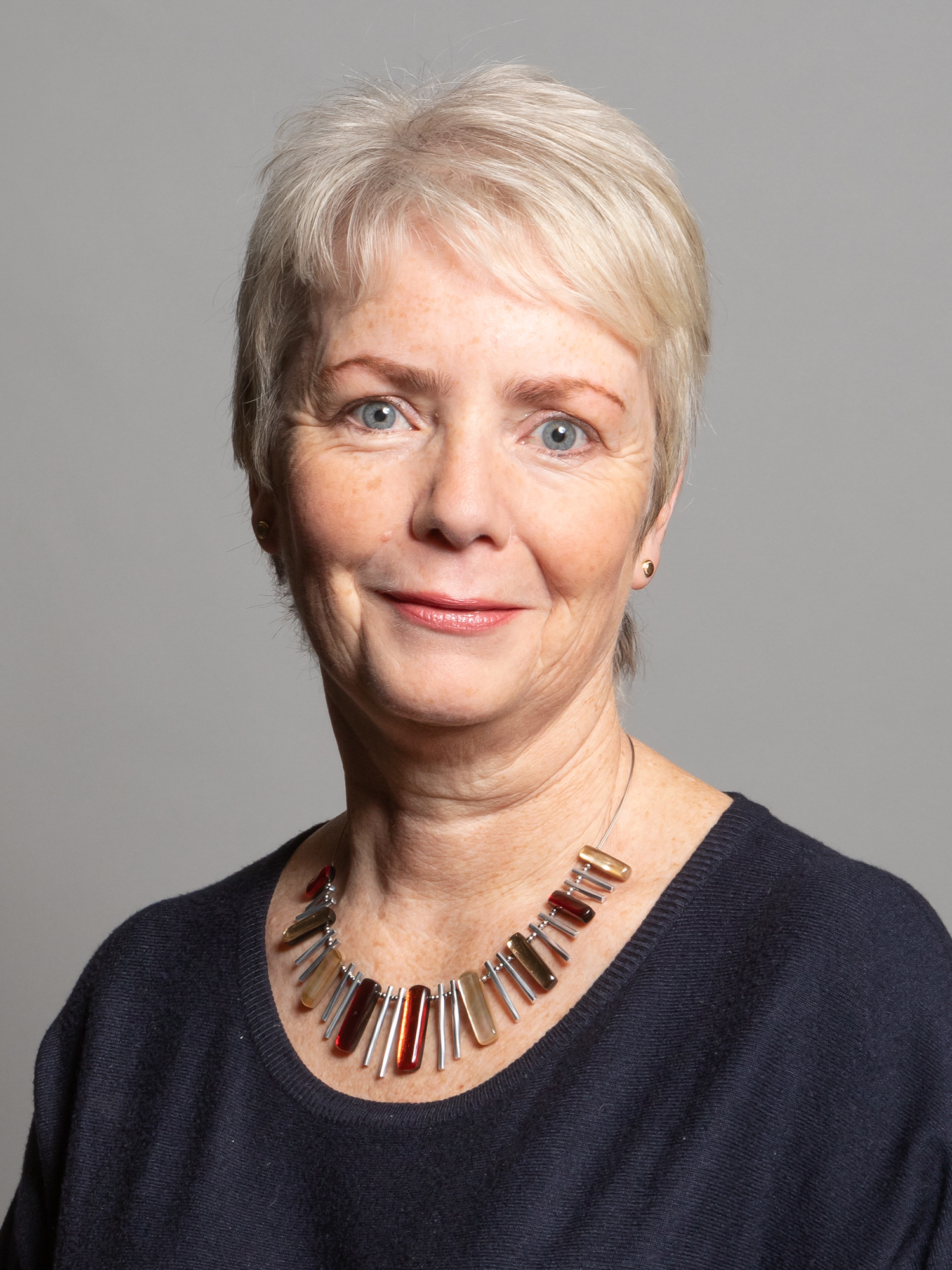
- Official portrait, 2020

Minister of State for Health (Secondary Care) (Note: Health until July 2026)
- Incumbent
- Assumed office 8 July 2024
- Prime Minister: Keir Starmer; Andy Burnham
- Preceded by: Andrew Stephenson

Member of Parliament for Bristol South
- Incumbent
- Assumed office 7 May 2015
- Preceded by: Dawn Primarolo
- Majority: 7,666 (17.7%)
Shadow portfolios
2023–2024	Health
2021–2022	Social Care
2018–2021	Northern Ireland
2017–2020	Deputy Commons Leader

Personal details
- Born: 8 September 1964 (age 61) London, England
- Party: Labour
- Education: University of East Anglia (BA); University of Bath (MBA)
- Website: karinsmyth.com

Karin Marguerite Smyth (born 8 September 1964) is a British Labour Party politician serving as Member of Parliament (MP) for Bristol South since 2015. She has served as Minister of State for Health (Secondary Care) since July 2024.

== Early life and career ==
Karin Marguerite Smyth was born on 8 September 1964 in London. Her parents had emigrated from Ireland to England in the 1950s. Smyth has three children.

Smyth was educated at Bishopshalt School, Uxbridge College, the University of East Anglia (BA, 1988) where she was President of the Union of UEA Students, and the University of Bath (MBA, 1995). Smyth worked as an office manager for Bristol West MP Valerie Davey from 1997.

Smyth worked as an NHS manager at Bristol Clinical Commissioning Group. She was a non-executive director of Bristol North PCT from 2002 to 2006.

== Parliamentary career ==
After becoming an MP at the 2015 general election, Smyth became a member of the Public Accounts Committee in July 2015.

On 27 June 2016, she gave support to a series of shadow cabinet resignations aimed at ousting the Labour Leader, Jeremy Corbyn MP, in an open letter to constituents. She supported Owen Smith in the 2016 Labour leadership election.

From October 2016 to July 2017, Smyth was Parliamentary Private Secretary to Keir Starmer, Shadow Secretary of State for Exiting the European Union. From July 2017 to December 2018, she served as Shadow Deputy Leader of the House of Commons and on 30 July 2018 was appointed as a Shadow Minister in Labour's Northern Ireland team.

She attacked the wave of NHS trusts establishing wholly owned companies in 2018, saying that this led to further fragmentation of the NHS and was done purely for tax advantages.

On 28 June 2017, Matthew Niblett was jailed for 14 weeks for threatening to kill Smyth over what he felt was her failure to investigate his case.

Karin Smyth is a Co-Chair of the All-Party Parliamentary Group for Choice at the End of Life.

In the September 2023 British shadow cabinet reshuffle, she was appointed Shadow Minister for Health.

In the 2024 United Kingdom general election, she was appointed as Minister of State at the Department of Health and Social Care following the election of a Labour Government. She was appointed to the Starmer ministry as health minister. Appearing on BBC Breakfast in April 2025 she said the Conservative Party should 'apologise' for their pro-trans stance under Theresa May.

In July 2026, she was reappointed to the new government as Minister of State at the Department of Health and Social Care by Andy Burnham.

== Notes ==
Parliament of the United Kingdom
Preceded by Dawn Primarolo	Member of Parliament for Bristol South; 2015–present	Incumbent
