= John Stopford Challener =

British trade union leader

John Ernest Stopford Challener (11 August 1875 – 12 March 1906) was a British trade union leader.

== History ==
=== Early years ===
Born in Islington, Challener's parents died when he was young, and he was brought up by a relative who worked for the Great Northern Railway.

=== Career ===
He moved with his relative to Doncaster, and there began working for the railway company as a clerk. He was an early member of the National Association of Railway Clerks (RCA), being a founder member of its Doncaster branch, later in 1897.

Challener devoted much of his time to the union, attending each of its conferences, and in May 1899 taking the lead on a national campaign to increase clerks' salaries. The union's general secretary, John Hereford, resigned late in 1898 due to poor health, and Challener was the only candidate to replace him, being declared elected at the union's conference in June 1899. From 1900, he also served as the union's treasurer, and from 1902 he became the union's first full-time member of staff. As leader, Challener decided to bring the RCA into the mainstream British trade union movement; he registered it as a trade union in 1900, and arranged for it to affiliate to the Trades Union Congress in 1903. As a result, he was able to increase membership from 537, to 4,500, by 1906.

Challener was also politically active. He was the founding secretary of the Doncaster Labour Representation Committee (LRC), although he decided against advocating that the RCA affiliate to the national LRC. He stood for Doncaster Council in 1903 and 1904, although he was not elected, and he was also prominent on Doncaster Trades Council.

=== Accusations of theft and death ===
By 1905, issues with the RCA's finances had emerged. The union's 1905 conference supported a motion criticising Challener for financial mismanagement, although it also supported a motion of confidence in his overall leadership. However, further investigation revealed that the financial issues were due to theft rather than incompetence - he was ultimately revealed to have stolen £380. His mental health declined, and he travelled to Paris in 1906, where he shot himself.

Trade union offices
| Preceded by F. Parrish | General Secretary of the Railway Clerks' Association; 1899 – 1906 | Succeeded by Alexander Walkden |
