= Antony Woodward =

British writer (born 1963)

Antony Woodward is a British writer (born 1963). He is best known as the author of the 2001 flying memoir Propellerhead, and the 2010 gardening memoir The Garden in the Clouds, an account of moving with his wife and family to a Welsh mountain-top to create an unlikely garden, Tair-Ffynnon, fit to open to the public. Previously, Woodward worked as an advertising copywriter at various London advertising agencies including Collett Dickenson Pearce (CDP).

== Early life ==
Woodward was born in Bristol and grew up in the Mendip Hills in Somerset. His father, Dr Peter Woodward, was an x-ray crystallographer and lecturer in inorganic chemistry at Bristol University. His mother, Dr Elizabeth Davies (granddaughter of Liberal politician Sir William Howell Davies) was a botanical geneticist. Woodward's mother became reliant on a wheelchair following a riding accident in 1968. It was this fact, according to Woodward, along with growing up in a Modernist house, which drove the craving for wildness he describes in The Garden in the Clouds.

== Education ==
Woodward was educated at Eton and Selwyn College, Cambridge (where he was an Exhibitioner). Aged 28 he went to St Peter's College, Oxford as a postgraduate to study History of Art, also attending Florence University on an Italian Institute scholarship, before completing an MA in Architectural History at the Courtauld Institute of Art in 1993.

== Career ==
From 1986 to 1991 Woodward worked as an advertising copywriter at Mavity Gilmore Jaume, Still Price Court Twivy D'Souza and Collett Dickenson Pearce. After two years as a postgraduate, Woodward returned to copywriting from 1994 to 2001 (Ammirati Puris Lintas, Publicis) while writing his first book.

He has also written columns for the Independent on Sunday, Perspectives on Architecture, Tatler and Country Life

== Personal life ==
Woodward had a near-death escape in 1996 when he crashed his microlight aircraft into electricity cables near Lockerbie during the 1996 Round Britain Rally – an event recounted in Propellerhead.

Woodward is married to Verity Williams, a former board director of the advertising agency AMV BBDO. They have three children.

== Publications ==
- 2001 – Propellerhead (HarperCollins) ISBN 0-00-710729-3
- 2007 – The Wrong Kind of Snow: The Complete Daily Companion to the British Weather, with Rob Penn (Hodder & Stoughton. ISBN 978-0-340-93787-7
- 2010 – The Garden in the Clouds (HarperCollins) ISBN 978-0-00-721652-9

Propellerhead is a bildungsroman cataloguing Woodward's serial misadventures as he attempts to achieve pilot status to facilitate his stated aim of seducing women – one woman in particular, known throughout the book as 'Lift Girl'. In the process he inadvertently becomes obsessed with flying.

The Wrong Kind of Snow, co-written with Rob Penn, is a weather almanac doubling as a meteorological history of Britain. 'An idiosyncratic accumulation of strange weather-related factoids, quotes and anecdotes'. 'It is arranged in calendar format, a day to a page, and combines... tales of monster snowfalls... with first-hand accounts and weather-themed quotes from writers and poets.'

The Garden in the Clouds recounts Woodward's attempts to connect with the inner countryman he never found as a rural child. This he sets about by first seeking out his 'ultimate rural hideaway' – a cottage on a bleak mountain top – then trying to create a garden there: his way, he says, to 'consummate' his relationship with his idyll. The narrative touches on various linked themes: the true impulses behind the desire to garden; the meaning of place; the joys of winter; the human search for paradise – in particular the 'garden in our heads' that we all supposedly carry around and which hypnotists like to access to make their subjects relax.

== Critical reception. ==
=== Propellerhead ===
On publication different commentators said the book reminded them of the writings of Redmond O'Hanlon, Roger Deakin, Jonathan Raban and T.H.White. Propellerhead made several best-seller lists and was critically well received. 'What Nick Hornby did for football, Antony Woodward has done for flying ... Wonderful' (Observer). 'Woodward has a gift for storytelling and comic timing and his acute awareness of the absurdities of maleness make this an impossible book not to like' (Independent). 'Hugely engaging ... a true love affair, albeit with clouds and air' (Sunday Telegraph). 'A brilliant evocation of the thrill and romance of the sport' (Sunday Express). Propellerhead has remained continuously in print since publication and on its tenth anniversary, in 2011, was described by Pilot magazine as 'one of the best books ever written about flying'.

=== The Wrong Kind of Snow ===
'Endlessly fascinating, written with flair and a feel for the drama of the moment' said the Financial Times.

=== The Garden in the Clouds ===
'You start to see where all gardeners get their pleasures and compulsions' – The Times. 'I set out determined to dislike the book, and I completely failed to do so. There can be no higher praise than that.' – The Spectator. The Garden in the Clouds was a winner of the National Trust and Hay Festival Outdoors Books of the Year 2011, was a Book of the Year in The Spectator, The Times and The Tablet and was shortlisted for the Banff Mountain Book Prize.

== Garden (Tair-Ffynnon)(The Garden in the Clouds) ==
In 2007, Tair-Ffynnon, the six-acre smallholding in the Brecon Beacons which became the subject of The Garden in the Clouds, was accepted into The Yellow Book of gardens opening under the National Gardens Scheme for charity. At just over 1,200 feet, Woodward has claimed the garden is the highest in the UK, although this has been disputed.

Woodward has cited the influence of Derek Jarman's garden in Dungeness, for its simplicity, sense of place and limited range of local, often wild, plants, herbs and flowers. He has claimed that Tair-Ffynnon is, in his phrase, a 'not garden', because conventional garden features such as lawns, beds, shrubs, even plants, deliberately have no place in it. 'Tair-Ffynnon already was a garden – at least to me. It needed no embellishment. Our "garden" would consist merely of the existing idioms of the hill: the spring, walls, gates, wildflower meadows, stone piles, rusting farm implements. The views and clouds could do the rest.' The garden's few 'features' are site-specific, hill-top ones: an 'infinity vegetable patch'; clipped box balls 'rolling' down through a wild flower meadow; part of the Anglo-Welsh poet Edward Thomas's 'The Lofty Sky' painted onto the wall of a barn facing a take-off point for hang gliders and paragliders. Some commentators have declared the garden 'non-existent'.

In 2011 Tair-Ffynnon featured on ITV's Countrywise (ITV 14 June 2011) and in 2013 the garden was included in the book The Gardens of England: Treasures of the National Gardens Scheme (2013).

== Television ==
In 2011 Woodward was followed for the BBC 'Wonderland' documentary 'The Real Magnificent Men and Their Flying Machines'. The programme featured three competing teams as they prepared for and entered the British Microlight Aircraft Association's Round Britain Rally. The event was significant because it was the same rally in which Woodward had crashed so disastrously 15 years earlier and also because it marked the centenary of the original Daily Mail Circuit of Britain Air Race in 1911. Explaining his decision to re-enter the race, aged 48, as a 'routine midlife crisis', the film demonstrated Woodward's extreme incompetence in the air.

The film, especially Woodward's definition of a microlight as 'a chainsaw attached to a deckchair', sparked heated debate within the microlighting fraternity between the 'nutters or eccentrics' on one side and the more serious-minded, anxious to demonstrate the credibility of the sport, on the other.
