= Eustace Hill =

Welsh cricketer

Personal information
- Full name: Eustace Tickell Hill
- Born: 13 April 1869; Llandaff, Cardiff, Wales
- Died: 11 January 1933 (aged 63); Ruthin, Denbighshire, Wales
- Batting: Right-handed
- Role: Batsman
- Relatives: VT Hill (brother)

Domestic team information
- Years: Team
- 1890–1901: Somerset
- First-class debut: 26 May 1898 Somerset v Oxford University
- Last First-class: 6 June 1901 Somerset v Oxford University

Career statistics
Competition	First-class
Matches	2
Runs scored	70
Batting average	17.50
100s/50s	0/0
Top score	31
Catches/stumpings	3/–
- Source: CricketArchive, 29 December 2009

Eustace Tickell Hill (1869–1933) was a cricketer who made two first-class appearances for Somerset. The older brother of Vernon Hill, he first appeared for Somerset during their successful 1890 season. In a season in which Somerset remained undefeated against other county sides, Hill scored 20 and 0 batting at number five in a two-run victory over Hampshire. In 1892, he made two appearances against Lord Hawke's XI, playing one match for Madras Presidency and one for Bangalore and District. He made a further appearance for Madras Presidency the following December, playing against Parsees. He was back in England in July 1894, when he played for Somerset Club and Ground against Weston-super-Mare at the County Ground, Taunton, making a duck. His first-class debut came four years later, appearing alongside his brother for Somerset in the University Match against Oxford University., making 31 and 17 batting from number eight. His second, and final, first-class match was a repeat of his debut, playing Oxford University at the University Parks, Oxford in 1901. Coming in at number nine, after his brother had fallen for a duck, Hill also failed to score in the first-innings, but added 22 in the second.
