= Vernon Hill (cricketer, born 1871) =

Welsh cricketer (1871–1932)

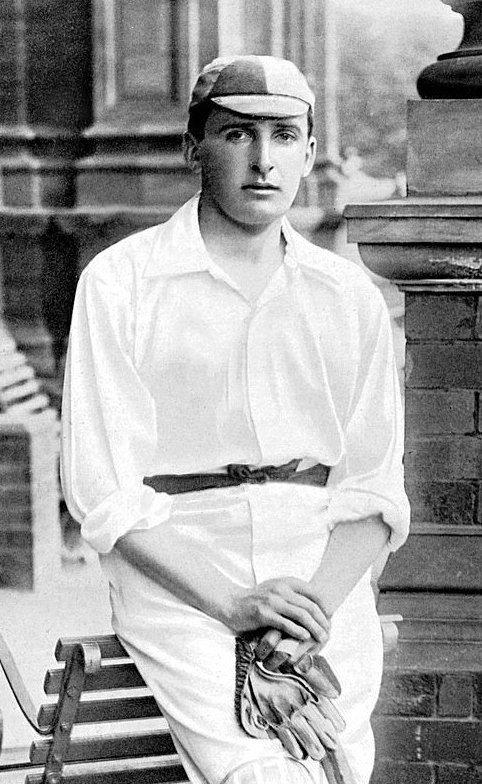

Personal information
- Full name: Vernon Tickell Hill
- Born: 30 January 1871; Llandaff, Cardiff, Wales
- Died: 29 September 1932 (aged 61); Woodspring Priory, Somerset, England
- Batting: Left-handed
- Bowling: Right-arm fast-medium
- Role: Batsman
- Relatives: ET Hill (brother)

Domestic team information
- Years: Team
- 1891–1912: Somerset
- 1892–1893: Oxford University
- First-class debut: 18 May 1891 Somerset v Middlesex
- Last First-class: 9 May 1912 Somerset v Hampshire

Career statistics
Competition	First-class
Matches	140
Runs scored	4560
Batting average	19.65
100s/50s	2/21
Top score	116
Balls bowled	1317
Wickets	31
Bowling average	29.38
5 wickets in innings	0
10 wickets in match	0
Best bowling	4/20
Catches/stumpings	124/–
- Source: CricketArchive, 2 January 2010

Vernon Tickell Hill (1871–1932) was a Welsh cricketer who made 140 first-class appearances for Somerset and Oxford University between 1891 and 1912. He first played for Somerset during their successful 1890 season. He made his top-score of 116 against Kent in 1898, sharing a seventh wicket partnership of 240 with Sammy Woods. He was an infrequent bowler, claiming 31 career first-class wickets with his right-arm fast-medium bowling, but never taking more than six wickets in a season. Hill twice toured the United States of America, first as a member of F Mitchell's XI, and then as a member of PF Warner's XI.

== Career ==
=== Family ===
Vernon was the son of Sir Edward Stock Hill. His elder brother Eustace also played for Somerset while his younger brother Percy played minor counties cricket for Glamorgan. Vernon's sons Mervyn and Evelyn played for Somerset. Mervyn also played first-class cricket for Glamorgan.

=== Early life ===
Vernon Hill initially attended Rev. J Cornish's School at Clevedon where he was a contemporary of Lionel Palairet. He went to Winchester College in 1884, was in the second eleven in 1886 and the first eleven from 1887 to 1889. At Winchester he was mainly known as a bowler. In these years he made appearances for the College against Eton. He went up to Oriel College, Oxford, in 1889. He played four games for Somerset in their undefeated summer of 1890, aged just 19, helping them regain first-class status. In the following 1891 County Championship, he appeared in nine of the county's twelve matches, also playing one match for Oxford University against Oxfordshire. He played nine times in first-class university matches for Oxford in 1892, under the captaincy of his friend and Somerset teammate Lionel Palairet. It was while playing for Oxford in the Varsity match that Hill hit his first century, a 100-minute 114, adding 178 in a sixth wicket stand with Malcolm Jardine. Hill played for Somerset again through the summer, scoring 224 runs in his 13 innings for the county. In 1893, Hill played four more times for the University without making a notable impression on the scorecard.

=== Somerset (1893–1902) ===
In addition to his four matches for the University in 1893, Hill made seven appearances for Somerset that summer, but his poor form with the bat was replicated for both sides. He failed to make a first-class half-century all season, the 47 scored in Somerset's innings and 170 run victory over Gloucestershire being his top-score. His attacking style lent itself to quick scoring, but not always to making big totals. Of his 114 in the Varsity match, Wisden says that he hit with "a power which was absolutely amazing". In From Sammy to Jimmy: The Official History of Somerset County Cricket Club, Peter Roebuck describes his intent "to hit every ball as far as he could". During his time at Winchester, Hill had been used as a bowler, but was rarely used at Somerset. In 1894 against Nottinghamshire, he was brought on as the seventh change bowler, only wicket-keeper Leslie Gay and fellow opener Richard Palairet unused. In his 1.4 overs, Hill claimed three wickets for the expense of only a single run.

=== Return to Wales (1903–1907) ===
Just after the turn of the century, Hill returned to his native Wales and took over the captaincy of Cardiff Cricket Club. He also took on a large role off the field, organising fund-raising fixtures at Cardiff Arms Park, including an annual Gentlemen v Players match. Glamorgan benefited greatly both socially and financially from these fixtures, and it is likely that without Hill's work, Glamorgan would not have been able to achieve first-class status as early as 1921. During this time he was a partner in the firm W R Corfield and Co, ship managers and ship brokers. The partnership was formally dissolved on 1 June 1908, with William Reginald Corfield continuing the business on his own.

=== Somerset (1908–1912) ===
In 1908, Hill moved back to the South West and nineteen further games for Somerset. After a number of games in both the 1908 and 1909 seasons, his appearances were limited in each of the following three years, and his last match was played in May 1912. In 1925, Hill was one of five partners in Woodspring & Sand Bay Dairies in Weston-super-Mare; the other partners were Gwynnedd Blanche Hill, Eric Sanderson Armstrong and Ernest Carter and Jack Robson Carter. The partnership was dissolved on 1 October 1925, with Hill and Gwynnedd Blanche Hill continuing the business.

He owned Woodspring Priory and farmed the surrounding land.

=== Military service ===
Despite being 43 when the First World War began, Hill joined the British Army, being commissioned as a temporary captain in 12th Battalion, King's Royal Rifle Corps on 7 December 1914. This was one of the so-called Service Battalions, raised as part of Kitchener's Army. At the time he was commissioned, the battalion was based at Blackdown Camp and moved to Hindhead in February 1915, and Larkhill in April, before landing at Boulogne on 21 July 1915. The battalion was part of 60 Infantry Brigade in 20th (Light) Division. Hill served in France, and by the time he relinquished his commission on 12 May 1919 on demobilisation, had been promoted to temporary major and appears to have transferred to the General List.

== Bibliography ==
- Foot, David. Sunshine, Sixes and Cider: The History of Somerset Cricket (1986 ed.). Newton Abbot, Devon: David & Charles. ISBN 0-7153-8890-8.
