= Rob Penn =

British writer, photographer and broadcaster

Robert Penn (born 1967) is a British writer, photographer and broadcaster. He is a frequent columnist in UK national newspapers and has written widely on such subjects as cycling, travel, British woodlands and life in the Brecon Beacons, Wales.

Penn was born in Birmingham to an English father and Manx mother and grew up in the Isle of Man. Penn studied history at the University of Bristol.

He has cycled around the world and across Wales in the dark.

His latest book, Slow Rise: A Bread-Making Adventure was published by Particular Books/Penguin in February 2021. His book, The Man Who Made Things Out of Trees was BBC Radio Four 'Book of the Week' in December 2015. His other books include The Wrong Kind of Snow – a survey of the British obsession with the weather, co-authored with Antony Woodward – and It's All About the Bike, which documents his worldwide search for the perfect custom bike, while narrating the social history of the bicycle. It's All About the Bike was a Sunday Times bestseller in the UK; it has been translated into thirteen languages.

== Television ==
In 2010, he wrote and presented the television documentary Ride of my Life: the Story of the Bicycle, based on his book It's All About the Bike, which was broadcast on BBC4 and BBC2. In 2012, he presented the six-part series Tales from the Wild Wood for BBC4, about British woodlands.

In 2013, he cycled 1,200 km through the heart of the Amazon rainforest with former England cricket captain Andrew Flintoff for the two-part Sky1 documentary Flintoff's Road to Nowhere.

In 2014, he travelled round Britain in a fish and chip van with Flintoff, making a six-part series for Sky1. "Lord of the Fries" was broadcast in February and March 2015. The second series, Flintoff Fries Again was broadcast on Sky 1 in February and March 2016.

== Publications ==
- 2021 - Slow Rise: A Bread-Making Adventure (Particular Books. ISBN 978-0241352083)
- 2015 - The Man Who Made Things Out of Trees (Particular Books. ISBN 978-1846148422)
- 2010 – It's All About the Bike: The Pursuit of Happiness on Two Wheels (Particular Books. ISBN 978-1-84614-262-8)
- 2008 – The Celtic Trail: The Official Guide to National Cycle Network Routes 4 and 47 from Fishguard to Chepstow (Pocket Mountains Ltd. ISBN 978-0-9554548-6-8)
- 2007 – The Wrong Kind of Snow: The Complete Daily Companion to the British Weather, with Antony Woodward (Hodder & Stoughton. ISBN 978-0-340-93787-7)
- 2005 – A Place to Cycle: Amazing Rides from Around the World (Conran Octopus. ISBN 978-1-84091-391-0)
- 2004 – The Sky is Falling on Our Heads: A Journey to the Bottom of the Celtic Fringe (Sceptre. ISBN 978-0-340-82752-9)
