= Alexander Walkden, 1st Baron Walkden =

British trade union leader and Labour politician

Walkden (on right) as part of a Trades Union Congress delegation to Downing Street in 1925

Alexander George Walkden, 1st Baron Walkden (11 May 1873 – 25 April 1951) was a British trade union leader and Labour politician.

== Trade unionism ==
In 1906 Walkden was appointed the fourth General Secretary of the Railway Clerks' Association (the modern Transport Salaried Staffs' Association) at a particularly important point in its history. His immediate predecessor, John Stopford Challener, had absconded with most of the union's money—a crime which was only discovered after he committed suicide in Paris. Walkden was an extremely able administrator and socialist, who in his thirty years as general secretary built up the impoverished union into a respected organisation which was influential in both the Labour Party and the trade union movement. In his period of office he was also influential in the creation of the International Transport Workers' Federation (ITF). At thirty years (1906–1936) he is the longest-serving general secretary in the history of the RCA/TSSA, his nearest rival being the fifteen years served by Richard Rosser between 1989 and 2004. When the union built its new headquarters building adjacent to London's Euston railway station in the 1960s, it was named Walkden House in his honour.

== Political career ==
Walkden unsuccessfully stood for Parliament as the Labour candidate in Wolverhampton West at the 1918 general election, at a by-election in 1922 and at the 1922 general election. He was unsuccessful again in Heywood and Radcliffe in 1924, but was elected at the 1929 general election as Member of Parliament (MP) for Bristol South. Although seriously ill for much of the 1929–1931 Parliament, Walkden was active in pressing for legislation to create London Transport, a long-time policy of the union. The Labour government fell before the London Passenger Transport Act could be passed, and he lost his seat in the 1931 general election but as a union leader, he pressed the subsequent National Government to reintroduce the bill, which it did in 1932, and it came into effect in 1933. Walkden was re-elected for Bristol South at the 1935 general election, serving until he retired from the House of Commons at the 1945 general election. on 9 July 1945 he was elevated to the peerage as Baron Walkden, of Great Bookham in the County of Surrey. He then served under Clement Attlee as Captain of the Yeomen of the Guard (Deputy Chief Whip in the House of Lords) from 1945 until 1949.

== Personal life ==
Lord Walkden died in April 1951, aged 77, when the barony became extinct.

Parliament of the United Kingdom
Preceded by Beddoe Rees	Member of Parliament for Bristol South; 1929–1931	Succeeded by Noel Ker Lindsay
Preceded by Noel Ker Lindsay	Member of Parliament for Bristol South; 1935–1945	Succeeded by William Wilkins
Trade union offices
Preceded by John Stopford Challener	General Secretary of the Railway Clerks' Association; 1906 – 1936	Succeeded by William Stott
Preceded by John Bromley	President of the Trades Union Congress; 1933	Succeeded by Andrew Conley
Preceded by Joe Hall and Jimmy Rowan	Trades Union Congress representative to the American Federation of Labour; 1934; With: John Stokes	Succeeded by Andrew Conley and Andrew Naesmith
Political offices
Preceded by The Lord Templemore	Captain of the Yeomen of the Guard; 1945–1949	Succeeded by The Lord Shepherd
Peerage of the United Kingdom
New creation	Baron Walkden; 1945–1951	Extinct
