= Tim Lord =

English barrister (born 1966)

The Honourable Timothy Lord KC
- Born: Timothy Michael Lord; 10 February 1966 (age 60)
- Education: Bedford Modern School; Christ's College, Cambridge
- Occupation: Barrister
- Known for: King's Counsel; Cambridge University cricketer Cambridge University R.U.F.C. player

The Honourable Timothy Michael Lord KC (born 10 February 1966) is an English barrister, King's Counsel and Bencher of the Inner Temple, who successfully acted for Guardian Care Homes against Barclays as part of the Libor fixing scandal.

== Life ==
Lord was born on 10 February 1966, the son of Michael Lord, Baron Framlingham. He was educated at Bedford Modern School and Christ's College, Cambridge, where he earned a blue for rugby.

Lord qualified as a solicitor in 1991 with Slaughter & May but was subsequently called to the Bar at the Inner Temple in 1992, practising at Brick Court Chambers. He was made Queen's Counsel in 2008, and elected a Bencher of the Inner Temple in 2013.

At the Chambers Bar Awards 2013, Lord was awarded "Commercial Litigation Silk of the Year". At the same awards in 2014, Lord was awarded "Banking and Finance Silk of the Year". Lord was featured in The Lawyer as one of their Hot 100 Barristers in 2013 and appeared in two of The Lawyer's Top 20 Cases of 2013 and was in three of their Top 20 Cases in 2014.

In 2001, Lord married Amanda Jane Green. He played first-class Cricket for Cambridge University and is a playing member of the MCC.
