= Central Suffolk and North Ipswich =

UK Parliament constituency (since 1997)

Coordinates: 52.2°N 1.15°E

- County constituency for the House of Commons
- Interactive map of boundaries since 2024
- Location within the East of England
- County: Suffolk
- Population: 98,935 (2011 census)
- Electorate: 71,020 (March 2020)
- Major settlements: Needham Market, Kesgrave and Framlingham

Current constituency
- Created: 1997
- Member of Parliament: Patrick Spencer (Conservative)
- Seats: One
- Created from: Central Suffolk

Central Suffolk and North Ipswich is a constituency (Note: A county constituency (for the purposes of election expenses and type of returning officer)) represented in the House of Commons of the UK Parliament since 2024 by Patrick Spencer of the Conservative Party.

== Constituency profile ==
Central Suffolk and North Ipswich is a large rural constituency located in Suffolk. It contains some northern suburbs of the large town of Ipswich (Castle Hill and Whitehouse) and the rural area to its north. The constituency's largest town is Kesgrave with a population of around 15,000. Other settlements in the constituency include the small towns of Needham Market and Framlingham, the villages of Debenham and Bramford and many smaller villages. Kesgrave is affluent and suburban in character, and Needham Market and Framlingham are historic market towns. The constituency is predominantly agricultural.

Compared to nationwide averages, residents of the constituency are older, wealthier and have average levels of education and professional employment. White people make up 93% of the population. Most of the constituency is represented by Green Party councillors at the district council level, whilst Kesgrave elected Conservatives and the Ipswich suburbs elected Labour Party representatives. A majority of voters in the constituency supported leaving the European Union in the 2016 referendum, with an estimated 56% voting in favour of Brexit.

== History ==
The county constituency was formed for the 1997 general election, largely from eastern parts of the abolished constituency of Central Suffolk, including the north-western wards of the Borough of Ipswich. It also included western fringes of Suffolk Coastal.

Michael Lord, knighted in 2001, who had held the predecessor seat of Central Suffolk, was the first MP who served the seat, from 1997 until 2010. The 2010 general election saw the fourth win for a Conservative with the election of Dan Poulter, who retained the seat at the three subsequent elections. Dan Poulter announced his defection to Labour in April 2024, and did not seek re-election.

the 2024 election, Patrick Spencer was elected for the Conservative Party, but sat as an independent following his suspension from the party in May 2025 as a result of being charged with two counts of sexual assault. The whip was restored in July 2026 after his acquittal at Southwark Crown Court.

== Boundaries and boundary changes ==
=== Historic ===
==== 1997–2010 ====
- The District of Mid Suffolk wards of Barham, Barking, Bramford, Claydon, Creeting, Debenham, Eye, Fressingfield, Helmingham, Hoxne, Mendlesham, Palgrave, Stonham, Stradbroke, Wetheringsett, Weybread, and Worlingworth;
- The District of Suffolk Coastal wards of Bealings, Dennington, Earl Soham, Framlingham, Glemham, Grundisburgh and Witnesham, Hasketon, Kesgrave, Otley, Rushmere, and Wickham Market; and
- The Borough of Ipswich wards of Broom Hill, Castle Hill, Whitehouse, and Whitton.

Map of boundaries 2010–2024

==== 2010–2024 ====
- The District of Mid Suffolk wards of Barking and Somersham, Bramford and Blakenham, Claydon and Barham, Debenham, Eye, Fressingfield, Helmingham and Coddenham, Hoxne, Mendlesham, Palgrave, Stradbroke and Laxfield, The Stonhams, Wetheringsett, and Worlingworth;
- The District of Suffolk Coastal wards of Earl Soham, Framlingham, Grundisburgh, Hacheston, Kesgrave East, Kesgrave West, Otley, Rushmere St Andrew, Wickham Market, and Witnesham; and
- The Borough of Ipswich wards of Castle Hill, Whitehouse, and Whitton.

Lost the Borough of Ipswich ward of Broom Hill which had been abolished by a revision of the borough wards; area covered by the ward now included in Ipswich. Other marginal changes due to revision of local authority wards.

=== Current ===
Following the 2023 review of Westminster constituencies, which came into effect for the 2024 general election, the composition of the constituency is as follows:

- The District of East Suffolk wards of: Carlford & Fynn Valley; Framlingham; Kesgrave; Rushmere St. Andrew; Wickham Market.
- The Borough of Ipswich wards of: Castle Hill; Whitehouse; Whitton.
- The District of Mid Suffolk wards of: Battisford & Ringshall; Blakenham; Bramford; Claydon & Barham; Debenham; Needham Market; Stonham.

Northern areas, including Eye, now form part of the newly created constituency of Waveney Valley, with transfers in from Bury St Edmunds of the town of Needham Market and surrounding areas, and a small area from Suffolk Coastal.

== Members of Parliament ==
Central Suffolk prior to 1997

Election	Member	Party
1997	Michael Lord	Conservative
2010	Dan Poulter	Conservative
April 2024	Dan Poulter	Labour
2024	Patrick Spencer	Conservative
2025	Patrick Spencer	Independent
2026	Patrick Spencer	Conservative

== Elections ==
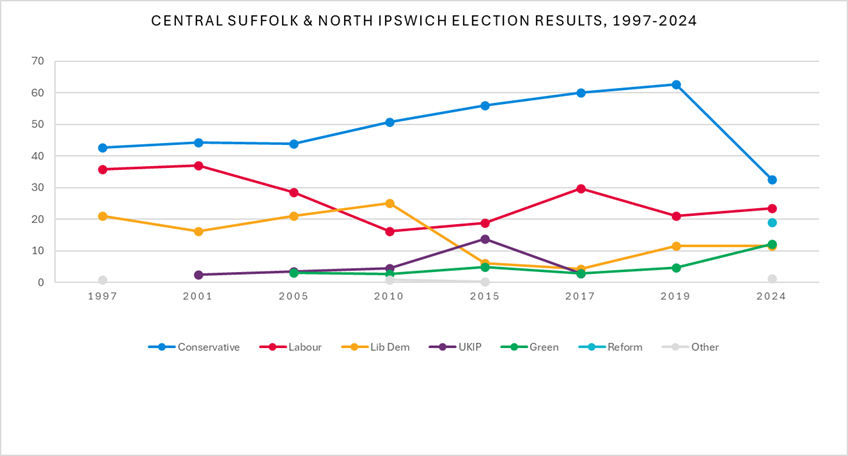
Central Suffolk and North Ipswich election results 1997–2024

=== Elections in the 2020s ===
General election 2024: Central Suffolk and North Ipswich
Party	Candidate	Votes	%	±%
Conservative	Patrick Spencer	15,144	32.6	−29.3
Labour	Kevin Craig (Note: After nominations for the 2024 general election closed, the Labour Party withdrew support for Kevin Craig on 25 June due to placing a bet on the outcome of the election in the seat. Kevin Craig was subsequently cleared of any wrongdoing and reinstated as a member of the Labour Party.)	10,854	23.4	+1.6
Reform	Tony Gould	8,806	19.0	N/A
Green	Daniel Pratt	5,652	12.2	+6.6
Liberal Democrats	Brett Mickelburgh	5,407	11.6	+1.0
Independent	Charlie Caiger	366	0.8	N/A
Independent	Mike Hallatt	194	0.4	N/A
Majority		4,290	9.2	−30.9
Turnout		46,423	64.5	−6.5
Registered electors		71,975		
Conservative hold		Swing	−15.5	

=== Elections in the 2010s ===
2019 notional result
Party	Vote	%
Conservative	31,222	61.9
Labour	11,009	21.8
Liberal Democrats	5,365	10.6
Green	2,816	5.6
Turnout	50,412	71.0
Electorate	71,020	

General election 2019: Central Suffolk and North Ipswich
Party	Candidate	Votes	%	±%
Conservative	Dan Poulter	35,253	62.7	+2.6
Labour	Emma Bonner-Morgan	11,862	21.1	−8.6
Liberal Democrats	James Sandbach	6,485	11.5	+7.2
Green	Daniel Pratt	2,650	4.7	+1.8
Majority		23,391	41.6	+11.2
Turnout		56,250	73.8	+1.4
Conservative hold		Swing	+5.6	

General election 2017: Central Suffolk and North Ipswich
Party	Candidate	Votes	%	±%
Conservative	Dan Poulter	33,992	60.1	+4.0
Labour	Elizabeth Hughes	16,807	29.7	+10.9
Liberal Democrats	Aidan Van de Weyer	2,431	4.3	−1.8
Green	Regan Scott	1,659	2.9	−2.0
UKIP	Stephen Searle	1,635	2.9	−10.9
Majority		17,185	30.4	−6.9
Turnout		56,524	72.4	+1.7
Conservative hold		Swing	−3.4	

General election 2015: Central Suffolk and North Ipswich
Party	Candidate	Votes	%	±%
Conservative	Dan Poulter	30,317	56.1	+5.3
Labour	Jack Abbott	10,173	18.8	+2.6
UKIP	Mark Cole	7,459	13.8	+9.4
Liberal Democrats	Jon Neal	3,314	6.1	−18.9
Green	Rhodri Griffiths	2,664	4.9	+2.2
English Democrat	Tony Holyoak	162	0.3	N/A
Majority		20,144	37.3	+11.5
Turnout		54,089	68.7	−1.7
Conservative hold		Swing	+1.4	

General election 2010: Central Suffolk and North Ipswich
Party	Candidate	Votes	%	±%
Conservative	Dan Poulter	27,125	50.8	+6.2
Liberal Democrats	Andrew Aalders-Dunthorne	13,339	25.0	+4.7
Labour	Bhavna Joshi	8,636	16.2	−12.3
UKIP	Roy Philpott	2,361	4.4	+0.9
Green	Andrew Stringer	1,452	2.7	−0.6
Independent	Mark Trevitt	389	0.7	N/A
New Party	Richard Vass	118	0.2	N/A
Majority		13,786	25.8	+10.4
Turnout		53,420	70.4	+3.4
Conservative hold		Swing	+0.8	

=== Elections in the 2000s ===
General election 2005: Central Suffolk and North Ipswich
Party	Candidate	Votes	%	±%
Conservative	Michael Lord	22,333	43.9	−0.5
Labour	Neil Macdonald	14,477	28.5	−8.6
Liberal Democrats	Andrew Houseley	10,709	21.1	+5.0
UKIP	John West	1,754	3.4	+1.0
Green	Martin Wolfe	1,593	3.1	N/A
Majority		7,856	15.4	+8.1
Turnout		50,866	66.7	+3.2
Conservative hold		Swing	+4.1	

General election 2001: Central Suffolk and North Ipswich
Party	Candidate	Votes	%	±%
Conservative	Michael Lord	20,924	44.4	+1.8
Labour	Carole Jones	17,455	37.1	+1.2
Liberal Democrats	Ann Elvin	7,593	16.1	−4.5
UKIP	Jonathan Wright	1,132	2.4	N/A
Majority		3,469	7.3	+0.6
Turnout		47,104	63.5	−11.5
Conservative hold		Swing	+0.3	

=== Elections in the 1990s ===
General election 1997: Central Suffolk and North Ipswich
Party	Candidate	Votes	%	±%
Conservative	Michael Lord	22,493	42.6	−7.0
Labour	Carole Jones	18,955	35.9	+12.4
Liberal Democrats	Minone Goldspink	10,709	21.1	−5.4
Ind. Conservative	Stephanie A. Bennell	489	0.9	+0.9
Majority		3,538	6.7	
Turnout		52,823	75.0	
Conservative win (new seat)				

== See also ==
- parliamentary constituencies in Suffolk
