= Bristol, West of England and South Wales Operatives Trade and Provident Society =

Former trade union of the United Kingdom

Operatives Trade and Provident Society
- Bristol, West of England and South Wales Operatives Trade and Provident Society
- Founded: 1873
- Dissolved: c.1937
- Headquarters: Dorset House, North Street, Bedminster
- Location: United Kingdom
- Members: 49,301 (1910)
- Key people: John Fox
- Affiliations: TUC (until 1900)

The Bristol, West of England and South Wales Operatives Trade and Provident Society was a trade union representing labourers in parts of England and Wales.

The union was founded in 1873 by T. M. Kelly and within a year claimed 10,000 members. However, this figure was disputed, with the Board of Trade claiming that it had little more than 1,000 members at this time. Either way, it saw growth as by the end of the century it had 25,450 members and 247 branches, making it the second largest union for labourers in the UK, after the National Union of Gas Workers and General Labourers. The small Amalgamated Corporation Employees Union (Bristol) merged in at this time.

The union's membership peaked at 49,301 in 1910, and it then slowly declined, with most of the dock workers in the union transferring to the National Union of Dock, Riverside and General Workers in Great Britain and Ireland. In 1935, it still had 35,104 members, but it appears to have collapsed around 1937.

== General Secretaries ==
1873: T. M. Kelly
1874: John Fox
