= Edward Stock Hill =

British shipowner and Conservative Party politician

Hill in 1895.

Colonel Sir Edward Stock Hill KCB VD JP (13 January 1834 – 17 December 1902) was a British shipowner and Conservative Party politician in the United Kingdom who served as Member of Parliament (MP) for Bristol South from 1886 to 1900.

== Career ==
Hill was born in Bedminster, Bristol in 1834, the youngest son of Charles Hill and Mary Arthur, both from Bristol. He was educated at Bishop's College, Bristol, and abroad.

In 1855 he became partner in his father's firm, renamed Messrs. Charles Hill and sons, shipbuilders and shipowners, of Albion Dockyard, Bristol, and of Cardiff. The firm started a steamship line between Bristol and New York in 1880. Hill was president of the Chamber of Shipping in 1881, and a member of the council of the Associated Chambers of Commerce (and its president 1888-1891).

He unsuccessfully contested the newly created Bristol South constituency at the 1885 general election, and won the seat in 1886. He was re-elected in 1892 and 1895, and retired from politics at the 1900 general election. According to his obituary, it was "in a great measure due to the persistency of Sir Edward that the Government were induced to provide telegraphic communication between the lighthouses and lightships around the coast and the shore."

Hill was Lieutenant-Colonel Commandant of the 1st Glamorganshire Artillery Volunteers from 1864. He was High Sheriff of Glamorganshire in 1885, and a Justice of the peace for that county, and for Cardiff. He was made a Companion of the Order of the Bath (CB) in the 1881 Birthday Honours, and a Knight Commander of the Order of the Bath (KCB) on 10 May 1892. He was also a Knight of the Swedish Order of Vasa.

He served as president of Waverley Football Club in Bristol from 1889, and was a Provincial Grand Master for South Wales in the Masonic United Grand Lodge of England.

He died at the Bath Hotel, Dover street, in London on 17 December 1902, and was buried at Llandaff Cathedral Cemetery three days later.

== Family ==
He married on 26 April 1866 Fanny Ellen Tickell, daughter of Lieut.-General Richard Tickell, CB, of Ravensworth, Gloucestershire. They had four sons and three daughters: The family had a large house, Rookwood in the Cardiff suburb of Llandaff.

- Eustace Tickell Hill (b.1869), an officer in the 19th Hussars
- Vernon Tickell Hill (1871–1932)
- Rodrick Rickell Hill (b.1875)
- Percy Montgomery Tickell Hill (b.1877)
- Mabel Frances Hill
- Constance Gertrude Hill
- Gladys Claire Hill

Sir Edward's son was the Oxford University and Somerset cricketer Vernon Hill and his grandson Mervyn Hill represented Somerset, Glamorgan, Cambridge University and MCC.

Parliament of the United Kingdom
Preceded by Sir Joseph Dodge Weston	Member of Parliament for Bristol South; 1886 – 1900	Succeeded by Walter Long
