= Thomas Lewis (Bristol politician) =

Thomas Charles Lewis (born 12 December 1871) was a British trade unionist and politician.

Born in Worcester, Lewis attended elementary school before becoming a bricklayer. He moved to Bristol in about 1896, when he became involved in the trade union movement and joined the Bristol Socialist Society. In 1904, he was elected as treasurer of the local branch of the Operative Bricklayers' Society (OBS). He also became active in the Labour Party, for which he was elected to Bristol City Council in 1910, serving until 1920. At the 1918 United Kingdom general election, he stood as the party's candidate in Bristol South, taking second place with 31.8% of the vote.

In 1911, Lewis became president of the Bristol OBS, but resigned from the union in 1914. Instead, he joined the Dock, Wharf, Riverside and General Labourers' Union, which was growing rapidly in the city, becoming its full-time Bristol District Organiser. Until 1917, he also served as the secretary of Bristol Trades Council. This was a difficult period for the council, which was divided on its approach to World War I, ultimately deciding to oppose conscription but otherwise take a neutral position. In 1922, the Dockers' Union became part of the new Transport and General Workers' Union, Lewis becoming the financial secretary of its number 3 area.
