= George E. Hunt =

English cricketer

George Hunt
Personal information
- Full name: George Edward Hunt
- Born: 30 September 1894; Pill, Somerset, England
- Died: 22 January 1959 (aged 62); Bristol, Somerset, England
- Batting: Right-handed
- Bowling: Right-arm medium
- Role: Bowling all-rounder

Domestic team information
- Years: Team
- 1921–1931: Somerset

Career statistics
Competition	First-class
Matches	233
Runs scored	4,952
Batting average	15.42
100s/50s	1/18
Top score	101
Balls bowled	30,576
Wickets	386
Bowling average	32.87
5 wickets in innings	11
10 wickets in match	1
Best bowling	7/61
Catches/stumpings	197/–
- Source: CricInfo, 1 January 2009

George Edward Hunt (30 September 1894 – 22 January 1959) was an English cricketer who played over 200 matches for Somerset County Cricket Club as a bowling all-rounder. He scored nearly 5,000 first-class runs including one century and fifteen half-centuries, and took 386 wickets at a bowling average of 32.87 through a ten-year career from 1921 to 1931.

Hunt was a lower-order right-handed batsman and a right-arm medium-pace bowler often used as first-change. He was also a regular close-to-the-wicket fielder. His youngest brother Hubert, a history teacher, also played part-time for Somerset in 1936
