= Bristol South =

Parliamentary constituency in the United Kingdom, 1885 onwards

Coordinates: 51.42808°N 2.58587°W

- Borough constituency for the House of Commons
- Interactive map of boundaries from 2024
- Boundary of Bristol South in South West England
- County: City of Bristol
- Population: 107,365 (2011 census)
- Electorate: 74,696 (2023)
- Major settlements: Bedminster

Current constituency
- Created: 1885
- Member of Parliament: Karin Smyth (Labour)
- Seats: One
- Created from: Bristol

Bristol South is a constituency (Note: A borough constituency (for the purposes of election expenses and type of returning officer)) represented in the House of Commons of the UK Parliament since 2015 by Karin Smyth of the Labour Party. (Note: As with all constituencies, the constituency elects one Member of Parliament (MP) by the first past the post system of election at least every five years.) The constituency has been held by Labour since 1935.

== Constituency profile ==
The Bristol South constituency is located in the city of Bristol in South West England. It covers the areas to the south of the city centre, including the inner-city districts of Southville and Bedminster and the suburban neighbourhoods of Bishopsworth, Hartcliffe, Knowle West and Hengrove. Bristol is a major port city and has a long history of trade, including the slave trade. The areas of Bishopsworth, Hartcliffe and Knowle West contain a large proportion of social housing and are amongst the 10% most deprived parts of the country, while the areas closer to the city centre are wealthier.

Compared to national averages, residents of Bristol South are young, irreligious and have average levels of wealth, education and professional employment. White people make up 90% of the population. At the city council, areas close to the city centre are represented by Green Party councillors like much of the rest of Bristol. Suburban areas of the constituency elected a mixture of Labour Party, Conservative and Liberal Democrat councillors. Voters in Bristol South were estimated to have been marginally in favour of remaining in the European Union in the 2016 referendum, with the option receiving 51% of the vote compared to 48% nationally.

== Boundaries ==
Map of boundaries 1997–2024

The constituency covers the south-west of Bristol, bounded by the Avon New Cut to the north, the A37 Wells Road to the east, and the city boundaries to the south and west.

1885–1918: The Borough of Bristol wards of Bedminster East, Bedminster West, Bristol, and Redcliffe, and part of the civil parish of Bedminster.

1918–1950: The County Borough of Bristol wards of Bedminster East, Bedminster West, and Southville, and part of Somerset ward.

1950–1955: The County Borough of Bristol wards of Bedminster, Somerset, Southville, and Windmill Hill.

1955–1983: The County Borough of Bristol wards of Bedminster, Bishopsworth, Hengrove, Somerset, and Southville.

1983–1997: The City of Bristol wards of Bedminster, Bishopsworth, Filwood, Hartcliffe, Knowle, Southville, Whitchurch Park, and Windmill Hill.

1997–2024: The City of Bristol wards of Bedminster, Bishopsworth, Filwood, Hartcliffe, Hengrove, Knowle, Southville, Whitchurch Park, and Windmill Hill.

2024–present: The City of Bristol wards of Bedminster; Bishopsworth; Filwood; Hartcliffe & Withywood; Hengrove & Whitchurch Park; Southville; and Windmill Hill.

To bring the electorate within the permitted range, the Knowle ward was moved to Bristol East.

== History ==
The seat has elected Labour MPs at every election since 1935, the only seat in the south of England outside Greater London with such a record. The current MP, first elected in 2015, is Karin Smyth. The incumbent prior to Smyth was Dawn Primarolo, who held the seat for 28 years. She was a Minister of the Crown in the Blair ministry, and throughout the Cameron–Clegg coalition was a Deputy Speaker of the House of Commons.

The closest result, giving a marginal majority, was at the 1987 election, in which Dawn Primarolo (in her first contest) won by 2.7% of the vote. At that election the Social Democratic Party, a 'moderate' breakaway party from the Labour Party, (Note: See also spoiler effect) won 19.6% of the vote.

== Members of Parliament ==
Election	Member	Party
1885	Sir Joseph Dodge Weston	Liberal
1886	Sir Edward Stock Hill	Conservative
1900	Walter Long	Conservative
1906	Sir Howell Davies	Liberal
1916	Sir Howell Davies	Coalition Liberal
Jan 1922	Sir Howell Davies	National Liberal
1922	Sir Beddoe Rees	National Liberal
1923	Sir Beddoe Rees	Liberal
1929	Alexander Walkden	Labour
1931	Noel Ker Lindsay	Conservative
1935	Alexander Walkden	Labour
1945	William Wilkins	Labour
1970	Michael Cocks	Labour
1987	Dawn Primarolo	Labour
2015	Karin Smyth	Labour

== Elections ==
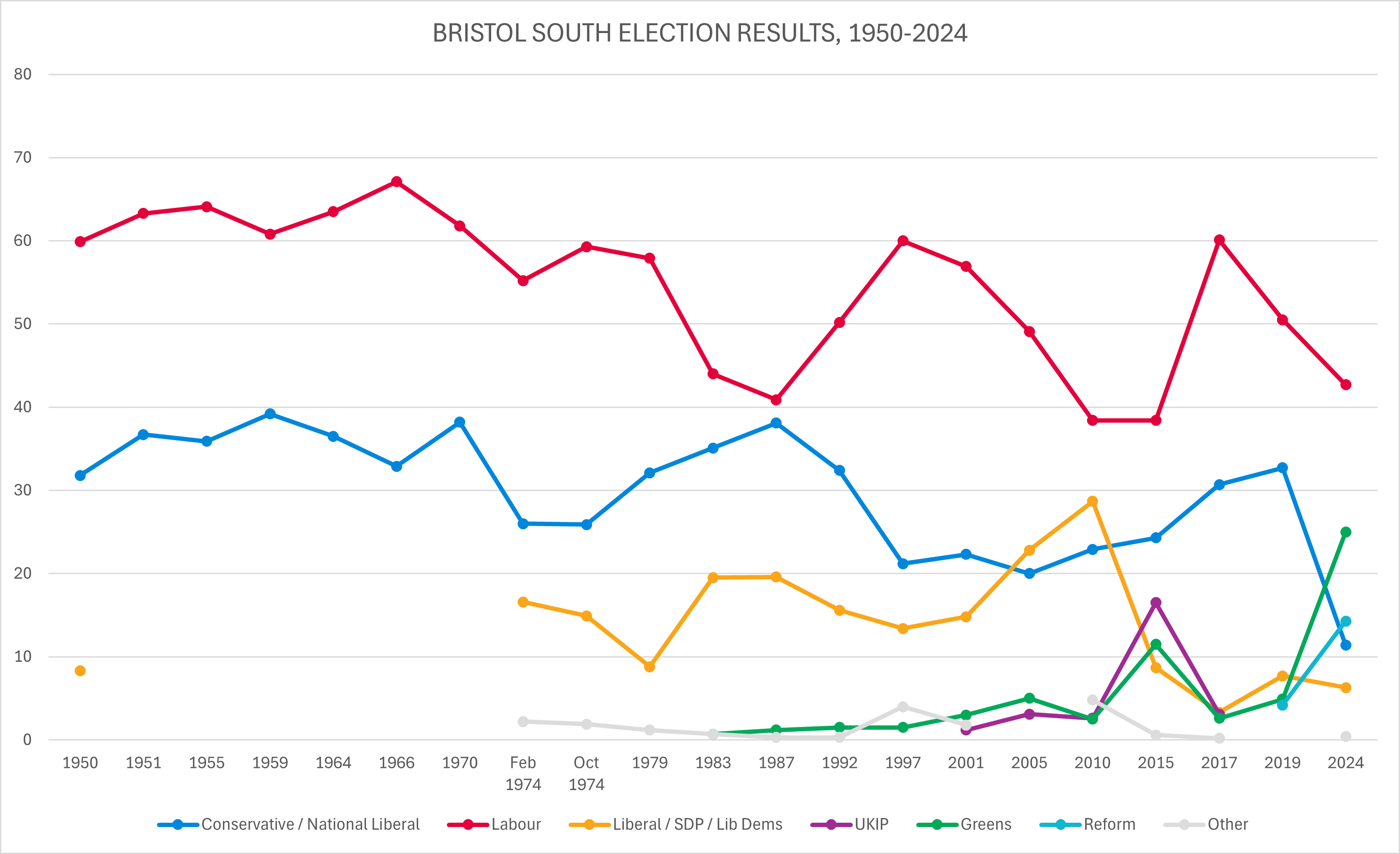
Election results 1950–2024

=== Elections in the 2020s ===
General election 2024: Bristol South
Party	Candidate	Votes	%	±%
Labour	Karin Smyth	18,521	42.7	−8.9
Green	Jai Breitnauer	10,855	25.0	+19.9
Reform	Richard Visick	6,195	14.3	+10.0
Conservative	Liz Brennan	4,947	11.4	−21.4
Liberal Democrats	Andrew Brown	2,721	6.3	+0.1
SDP	Neil Norton	164	0.4	N/A
Majority		7,666	17.7	−1.1
Turnout		43,403	57.5	−7.1
Registered electors		75,533		
Labour hold		Swing	−14.4	

=== Elections in the 2010s ===
2019 notional result
Party	Vote	%
Labour	24,917	51.6
Conservative	15,840	32.8
Liberal Democrats	3,012	6.2
Green	2,445	5.1
Brexit Party	2,054	4.3
Turnout	48,268	64.6
Electorate	74,696	

General election 2019: Bristol South
Party	Candidate	Votes	%	±%
Labour	Karin Smyth	27,895	50.5	−9.6
Conservative	Richard Morgan	18,036	32.7	+2.0
Liberal Democrats	Andrew Brown	4,227	7.7	+4.4
Green	Tony Dyer	2,713	4.9	+2.3
Brexit Party	Robert de Vito Boutin	2,325	4.2	N/A
Majority		9,859	17.8	−11.6
Turnout		55,196	65.6	+0.1
Labour hold		Swing	−5.8	

General election 2017: Bristol South
Party	Candidate	Votes	%	±%
Labour	Karin Smyth	32,666	60.1	+21.7
Conservative	Mark Weston	16,679	30.7	+6.4
Liberal Democrats	Ben Nutland	1,821	3.3	−5.4
UKIP	Ian Kealey	1,672	3.1	−13.4
Green	Tony Dyer	1,428	2.6	−8.9
Independent	John Langley	116	0.2	N/A
Majority		15,987	29.4	+15.3
Turnout		54,382	65.5	+3.5
Labour hold		Swing	+7.7	

General election 2015: Bristol South
Party	Candidate	Votes	%	±%
Labour	Karin Smyth	19,505	38.4	±0.0
Conservative	Isobel Grant	12,377	24.3	+1.4
UKIP	Steve Wood	8,381	16.5	+13.9
Green	Tony Dyer	5,861	11.5	+9.0
Liberal Democrats	Mark Wright	4,416	8.7	−20.0
TUSC	Tom Baldwin	302	0.6	+0.2
Majority		7,128	14.1	+4.4
Turnout		50,842	62.0	+0.4
Labour hold		Swing	−0.8	

General election 2010: Bristol South
Party	Candidate	Votes	%	±%
Labour	Dawn Primarolo	18,600	38.4	−10.7
Liberal Democrats	Mark Wright	13,866	28.7	+4.9
Conservative	Mark Lloyd Davies	11,086	22.9	+2.9
BNP	Colin Chidsey	1,739	3.6	N/A
UKIP	Colin McNamee	1,264	2.6	−0.5
Green	Charles Bolton	1,216	2.5	−2.5
English Democrat	Craig Clarke	400	0.8	N/A
TUSC	Tom Baldwin	206	0.4	N/A
Majority		4,734	9.7	−16.6
Turnout		48,377	61.6	+1.8
Labour hold		Swing	−7.5	

=== Elections in the 2000s ===
General election 2005: Bristol South
Party	Candidate	Votes	%	±%
Labour	Dawn Primarolo	20,778	49.1	−7.8
Liberal Democrats	Kay Barnard	9,636	22.8	+8.0
Conservative	Graham Hill	8,466	20.0	−2.3
Green	Charlie Bolton	2,127	5.0	+2.0
UKIP	Mark Dent	1,321	3.1	+1.9
Majority		11,142	26.3	−8.3
Turnout		42,328	59.8	+3.3
Labour hold		Swing	−7.9	

General election 2001: Bristol South
Party	Candidate	Votes	%	±%
Labour	Dawn Primarolo	23,299	56.9	−3.1
Conservative	Richard Eddy	9,118	22.3	+1.1
Liberal Democrats	James Main	6,078	14.8	+1.4
Green	Glenn Vowles	1,233	3.0	+1.5
Socialist Alliance	Brian Drummond	496	1.2	N/A
UKIP	Chris Prasad	496	1.2	N/A
Socialist Labour	Giles Shorter	250	0.6	N/A
Majority		14,181	34.6	−4.2
Turnout		40,970	56.5	−12.4
Labour hold		Swing		

=== Elections in the 1990s ===
General election 1997: Bristol South
Party	Candidate	Votes	%	±%
Labour	Dawn Primarolo	29,890	60.0	+9.8
Conservative	Michael Roe	10,562	21.2	−11.2
Liberal Democrats	Stephen Williams	6,691	13.4	−2.2
Referendum	Derek W. Guy	1,486	3.0	N/A
Green	John H. Boxall	722	1.5	0.0
Socialist	Ian P. Marshall	355	0.7	N/A
Glow Bowling Party	Louis P. Taylor	153	0.3	N/A
Majority		19,328	38.8	+21.0
Turnout		49,859	68.9	−8.9
Labour hold		Swing		

General election 1992: Bristol South
Party	Candidate	Votes	%	±%
Labour	Dawn Primarolo	25,164	50.2	+9.3
Conservative	John Bercow	16,245	32.4	−5.7
Liberal Democrats	Paul N. Crossley	7,822	15.6	−4.0
Green	John H. Boxall	756	1.5	+0.3
Natural Law	Neil D. Phillips	136	0.3	N/A
Majority		8,919	17.8	+15.0
Turnout		50,123	77.8	+3.7
Labour hold		Swing	+7.5	

=== Elections in the 1980s ===
General election 1987: Bristol South
Party	Candidate	Votes	%	±%
Labour	Dawn Primarolo	20,798	40.9	−3.1
Conservative	Philip Cutcher	19,394	38.1	+3.0
SDP	Hilary Long	9,952	19.6	+0.1
Green	Glenn Vowles	600	1.2	+0.5
Red Front	Carol Meghji	149	0.3	N/A
Majority		1,404	2.8	−6.1
Turnout		50,893	74.1	+5.3
Labour hold		Swing		

General election 1983: Bristol South
Party	Candidate	Votes	%	±%
Labour	Michael Cocks	21,824	44.0	
Conservative	Alistair B. Gammell	17,405	35.1	
SDP	David M. Stanbury	9,674	19.5	
Ecology	Geoff Collard	352	0.7	N/A
Communist	A. Chester	224	0.5	N/A
Workers Revolutionary	L.J. Byrne	113	0.2	
Majority		4,419	8.9	
Turnout		49,592	68.8	
Labour hold		Swing		

=== Elections in the 1970s ===
General election 1979: Bristol South
Party	Candidate	Votes	%	±%
Labour	Michael Cocks	25,038	57.9	−1.4
Conservative	Terry Dicks	13,855	32.1	+8.2
Liberal	C.J. Bidwell	3,815	8.8	−6.1
National Front	K.G. Elliott	392	0.9	−1.0
Workers Revolutionary	L.J. Cheek	135	0.3	N/A
Majority		11,183	25.8	−9.6
Turnout		43,235	71.9	+2.5
Labour hold		Swing		

General election October 1974: Bristol South
Party	Candidate	Votes	%	±%
Labour	Michael Cocks	25,108	59.3	+4.1
Conservative	R.J. Kellaway	10,124	23.9	−2.1
Liberal	D.R.F. Burrows	6,289	14.9	−1.7
National Front	P.H. Gannaway	798	1.9	−0.3
Majority		14,984	35.4	+6.2
Turnout		42,316	69.4	−5.3
Labour hold		Swing	+3.1	

General election February 1974: Bristol South
Party	Candidate	Votes	%	±%
Labour	Michael Cocks	24,909	55.2	−6.6
Conservative	R.J. Kellaway	11,742	26.0	−12.2
Liberal	H.J. Stevens	7,499	16.6	N/A
National Front	P.H. Gannaway	1,006	2.2	N/A
Majority		13,167	29.2	+5.6
Turnout		45,156	74.7	+9.8
Labour hold		Swing		

General election 1970: Bristol South
Party	Candidate	Votes	%	±%
Labour	Michael Cocks	24,662	61.8	−5.3
Conservative	David Hunt	15,254	38.2	+5.3
Majority		9,428	23.6	−10.6
Turnout		39,916	64.9	−4.6
Labour hold		Swing		

=== Elections in the 1960s ===
General election 1966: Bristol South
Party	Candidate	Votes	%	±%
Labour	William Wilkins	26,552	67.1	+3.6
Conservative	Robert William Wall	12,998	32.9	−3.6
Majority		13,554	34.2	+7.2
Turnout		39,550	69.5	−3.4
Labour hold		Swing		

General election 1964: Bristol South
Party	Candidate	Votes	%	±%
Labour	William Wilkins	26,569	63.5	+2.7
Conservative	Robert William Wall	15,282	36.5	−2.7
Majority		11,287	27.0	+5.4
Turnout		41,851	72.9	−2.8
Labour hold		Swing		

=== Elections in the 1950s ===
General election 1959: Bristol South
Party	Candidate	Votes	%	±%
Labour	William Wilkins	27,010	60.8	−3.3
Conservative	George Edward McWatters	17,428	39.2	+3.3
Majority		9,582	21.6	−6.6
Turnout		44,438	75.7	+1.0
Labour hold		Swing		

General election 1955: Bristol South
Party	Candidate	Votes	%	±%
Labour	William Wilkins	24,954	64.1	
Conservative	George Edward McWatters	13,978	35.9	
Majority		10,976	28.2	
Turnout		38,932	74.7	
Labour hold		Swing		

General election 1951: Bristol South
Party	Candidate	Votes	%	±%
Labour	William Wilkins	24,444	63.3	+3.4
Conservative	Herbert E.P. Buckle	14,161	36.7	+4.9
Majority		10,283	26.6	−1.5
Turnout		38,605	84.5	−0.6
Labour hold		Swing		

General election 1950: Bristol South
Party	Candidate	Votes	%	±%
Labour	William Wilkins	23,456	59.9	
Conservative	Lynch Maydon	12,473	31.8	
Liberal	Harold Tutt Kay	3,259	8.3	
Majority		10,983	28.1	
Turnout		39,188	85.1	
Labour hold		Swing		

=== Elections in the 1940s ===
General election 1945: Bristol South
Party	Candidate	Votes	%	±%
Labour	William Wilkins	24,929	58.8	+8.4
Conservative	Ted Leather	12,379	29.2	−15.8
Liberal	Douglas Arthur Jones	5,083	12.0	+7.3
Majority		12,550	29.6	+24.2
Turnout		42,391	75.5	−1.4
Labour hold		Swing		

=== Elections in the 1930s ===
General election 1935: Bristol South
Party	Candidate	Votes	%	±%
Labour	Alexander Walkden	22,586	50.4	+11.3
Conservative	Noel Lindsay	20,153	45.0	−15.9
Liberal	John Osborne Marshall Skelton	2,090	4.7	N/A
Majority		2,433	5.4	N/A
Turnout		44,829	76.9	−5.4
Labour gain from Conservative		Swing		

General election 1931: Bristol South
Party	Candidate	Votes	%	±%
Conservative	Noel Lindsay	26,694	60.9	N/A
Labour	Alexander Walkden	17,174	39.1	−17.4
Majority		9,520	21.8	N/A
Turnout		43,868	82.3	+1.4
Conservative gain from Labour		Swing		

=== Elections in the 1920s ===
General election 1929: Bristol South
Party	Candidate	Votes	%	±%
Labour	Alexander Walkden	23,591	56.5	+8.1
Liberal	Beddoe Rees	18,194	43.5	−8.1
Majority		5,397	13.0	N/A
Turnout		41,785	80.9	−2.1
Registered electors		51,628		
Labour gain from Liberal		Swing	+8.1	

General election 1924: Bristol South
Party	Candidate	Votes	%	±%
Liberal	Beddoe Rees	16,722	51.6	−1.1
Labour	David Vaughan	15,702	48.4	+1.1
Majority		1,020	3.2	−2.2
Turnout		32,424	83.0	+8.2
Registered electors		39,056		
Liberal hold		Swing	−1.1	

General election 1923: Bristol South
Party	Candidate	Votes	%	±%
Liberal	Beddoe Rees	15,235	52.7	−3.5
Labour	David Vaughan	13,701	47.3	+3.5
Majority		1,534	5.4	−7.0
Turnout		28,936	74.8	−1.1
Registered electors		38,675		
Liberal hold		Swing	−3.5	

General election 1922: Bristol South
Party	Candidate	Votes	%	±%
National Liberal	Beddoe Rees	16,199	56.2	−12.0
Labour	David Vaughan	12,650	43.8	+12.0
Majority		3,549	12.4	N/A
Turnout		28,849	75.9	+19.3
Registered electors		38,030		
National Liberal hold		Swing	−12.0	

=== Elections in the 1910s ===
Davies

General election 1918: Bristol South
Party		Candidate	Votes	%	±%
C	National Liberal	Howell Davies	13,761	68.2	
	Labour	Thomas Lewis	6,409	31.8	N/A
Majority			7,352	36.4	
Turnout			20,170	56.6	
Registered electors			35,663		
	National Liberal hold		Swing		
C indicates candidate endorsed by the coalition government.

General election December 1910: Bristol South
Party	Candidate	Votes	%	±%
Liberal	Howell Davies	6,895	50.5	−0.4
Conservative	J.T. Francombe	6,757	49.5	+0.4
Majority		138	1.0	−0.8
Turnout		13,652	84.4	−4.0
Registered electors		16,171		
Liberal hold		Swing	−0.4	

General election January 1910: Bristol South
Party	Candidate	Votes	%	±%
Liberal	Howell Davies	7,281	50.9	−9.3
Conservative	H.W. Chatterton	7,010	49.1	+9.3
Majority		271	1.8	−18.6
Turnout		14,291	88.4	−0.2
Registered electors		16,171		
Liberal hold		Swing	−9.3	

=== Elections in the 1900s ===
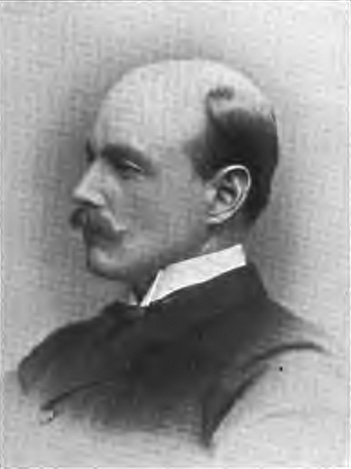
Walter Long

General election 1906: Bristol South
Party	Candidate	Votes	%	±%
Liberal	Howell Davies	7,964	60.2	+13.2
Conservative	Walter Long	5,272	39.8	−13.2
Majority		2,692	20.4	N/A
Turnout		13,236	88.6	+10.4
Registered electors		14,935		
Liberal gain from Conservative		Swing	+13.2	

General election 1900: Bristol South
Party	Candidate	Votes	%	±%
Conservative	Walter Long	5,470	53.0	−0.9
Liberal	Howell Davies	4,859	47.0	+0.9
Majority		611	6.0	−1.8
Turnout		10,329	78.2	−0.1
Registered electors		13,206		
Conservative hold		Swing	−0.9	

=== Elections in the 1890s ===
General election 1895: Bristol South
Party	Candidate	Votes	%	±%
Conservative	Edward Stock Hill	5,190	53.9	+1.0
Liberal	John O'Connor Power	4,431	46.1	−1.0
Majority		759	7.8	+2.0
Turnout		9,621	78.3	−1.0
Registered electors		12,281		
Conservative hold		Swing	+1.0	

General election 1892: Bristol South
Party	Candidate	Votes	%	±%
Conservative	Edward Stock Hill	4,990	52.9	−3.6
Liberal	William Wills	4,442	47.1	+3.6
Majority		548	5.8	−7.2
Turnout		9,432	79.3	+3.5
Registered electors		11,887		
Conservative hold		Swing	−3.6	

=== Elections in the 1880s ===
Hill

General election 1886: Bristol South
Party	Candidate	Votes	%	±%
Conservative	Edward Stock Hill	4,447	56.5	+7.1
Liberal	Joseph Dodge Weston	3,423	43.5	−7.1
Majority		1,024	13.0	N/A
Turnout		7,870	75.8	−4.5
Registered electors		10,384		
Conservative gain from Liberal		Swing	+7.1	

General election 1885: Bristol South
Party	Candidate	Votes	%	±%
Liberal	Joseph Dodge Weston	4,217	50.6	
Conservative	Edward Stock Hill	4,121	49.4	
Majority		96	1.2	
Turnout		8,338	80.3	
Registered electors		10,384		
Liberal win (new seat)				

== See also ==
- List of parliamentary constituencies in Avon
