= Cyberbullying =

Bullying in electronic communications

Cyberbullying (cyberharassment or online bullying/harassment) is a form of bullying or harassment using electronic means. Since the 2000s, it has become increasingly common, especially among teenagers and adolescents, due to young people's increased use of social media. Related issues include online/internet harassment and trolling. In 2015, according to cyberbullying statistics from the i-Safe Foundation, over half of adolescents and teens had been bullied online, and about the same number had engaged in cyberbullying. Both the bully and the victim are negatively affected, and the intensity, duration, and frequency of bullying are three aspects that increase the negative effects on both of them.

== Tactics ==
Harmful bullying behavior can include posting rumors, threats, sexual remarks, a victim's personal information, or hate speech. Bullying or harassment can be identified by repeated behavior and an intent to harm. Tactics can also include creating or posting on fake profiles to create anonymity to spread harmful messages.

== Overview ==
Cyberbullying is in many cases an extension of already existing traditional bullying. Students who are bullied via the Internet have, in most cases, also been bullied in other more traditional ways before (e.g., physically or verbally). There are few students who are bullied exclusively over the Internet; these cyber victims are often physically stronger students, which causes bullies to prefer online confrontations over face-to-face contact at school.

Awareness in the United States has risen in the 2010s, due in part to high-profile cases. Several US states and other countries have passed laws to combat cyberbullying. Some are designed to specifically target teen cyberbullying, while others extend from the scope of physical harassment. In cases of adult cyberharassment, these reports are usually filed beginning with local police. The laws differ by area or state.

Research has demonstrated a number of serious consequences of cyberbullying victimisation. Specific statistics on the negative effects of cyberbullying differ by country and other demographics. Some researchers point out there could be some way to use modern computer techniques to determine and stopping cyberbullying.

Other research has suggested an uptick in cyberbullying during the COVID-19 pandemic when many youth and adults were quarantined at home and, as a consequence, online more often than before the pandemic. For example, a study of adults published in the Journal of Social Psychology identified statistically significant increases in pro-cyberbullying attitudes as well as in cyberbullying offending behavior. However, another study involving over 6,500 Canadian youth in grades 4–12 did not find higher rates of cyberbullying involvement. The authors speculated that this might be a result of closer monitoring and involvement of online activities by parents while their children were at home.

Internet trolling is a common form of bullying that takes place in an online community (such as online gaming or social media) in order to elicit a reaction or disruption, or simply just for someone's own personal amusement. Cyberstalking is another form of bullying or harassment that uses electronic communications to stalk a victim; this may pose a credible threat to the victim.

Not all negative interaction online or on social media can be attributed to cyberbullying. Research suggests that there are also interactions online that result in peer pressure, which can have a negative, positive, or neutral impact on those involved.

== Definitions ==
A frequently used definition of cyberbullying is "an aggressive, intentional act or behavior that is carried out by a group or an individual, using electronic forms of contact, repeatedly and over time against a victim who cannot easily defend him or herself." It is to be distinguished from normal conflicts between people of comparable power or status that often also occur online.

There are many variations of the definition, such as the National Crime Prevention Council's more specific definition: "the process of using the Internet, cell phones or other devices to send or post text or images intended to hurt or embarrass another person." Cyberbullying is often similar to traditional bullying, with some notable distinctions. Victims of cyberbullying may not know the identity of their bully, or why the bully is targeting them, based on the online nature of the interaction. The harassment can have wide-reaching effects on the victim, as the content used to harass the victim can be spread and shared easily among many people and often remains accessible long after the initial incident.

The terms "cyberharassment" and "cyberbullying" are sometimes used synonymously, though some people use the latter to refer specifically to harassment among minors or in a school setting.

=== Cyberstalking ===
Cyberstalking is a form of online harassment in which the perpetrator uses electronic communications to stalk a victim. This is considered more dangerous than other forms of cyberbullying because it generally involves a credible threat to the victim's safety. Cyberstalkers may send repeated messages intended to threaten or harass, and they may encourage others to do the same, either explicitly or by impersonating their victim and asking others to contact them.

This can be a combination of most of the other methods in order to stalk someone using electronic means. This can include finding the victims location, harassing them with spam, or using sextortion. An example of this situation occurring is when Paris Deshaunte Evitt, a 30-year old from Tulsa cyberstalked one of his former partners. A news article on it states, "Between October 2018 and continuing until October 2020, Evitt used email, Facebook, and text messages to control and threaten the victim. However, his abuse of the victim had started years before. Between 2012 and 2019, Evitt was convicted on 5 different occasions for physically abusing the victim including strangulation, assault, and interfering with reporting. Evitt was also on state supervision at the time of the current offenses.""(The unidentified victim) explained that Evitt had destroyed her sense of security and became emotional when she discussed Evitt's statement that he would rather see her dead than happy. She also stated, 'the longer he is away from my children and I, the more time we have to try and heal and move on with our lives, if that is even possible.'"

=== Trolling ===
Internet trolls intentionally try to provoke or offend others in order to elicit a reaction. Trolls and cyberbullies do not always have the same goals: while some trolls engage in cyberbullying, others may be engaged in comparatively harmless mischief. A troll may be disruptive either for their own amusement or because they are genuinely a combative person. Trolling can include insults, false news, or, terrorist threats.

=== Hate raids ===
On Twitch and other livestreaming services, hate raids are situations where a stream is "raided" by many viewers who flood the chat with harassment and other hateful messages. This prevents the streamer from executing their stream. These viewers are typically automated bots, making it difficult to moderate and block.

=== Spam ===
Spamming is the act of creating multiple accounts and sending messages to a target en masse. A common situation where spam can occur is after a breakup. If one partner is obsessive, they may send their ex messages on multiple platforms. This often happens despite being blocked by the recipient. The article What Can Police Do About Harassing Texts? states, "Keep in mind that harassment of any kind is illegal and includes in person, over the phone, via text messages, through social media, or any other method. Some laws are in place about cyberbullying that are designed to protect the public from this happening."

=== Impersonation ===
Impersonation is the act of pretending be another person. If the offender pretends to be the victim, they may say or do things to hurt the victim's reputation. This can include hacking into a Twitter account and spreading disinformation. One famous example is when Sony Music's Twitter account was hacked and posted the following statement: "Britney Spears is dead by accident! we will tell you more soon. #RIPBRITNEY." Spears was, in fact, alive and well.

=== Doxxing ===
Doxxing is the act of disclosing a victim's personal data, such as their home address, phone number, and full name. Doxxing can happen when fans in fandoms with large fanbases often go too far when protecting their idols and enter the realm of cyberbullying. Extreme fans of the K-pop music genre sometimes dox fans of rival music groups. This specifically was shown in an incident where fans of the group Blackpink doxxed the owner of a Twice fan account, sending him to a hospital. This is allegedly because a Twice member disrespected a Blackpink member.

=== Sexual harassment ===
Online sexual harassment is considered a form of cyberbullying. Sextortion, a form of sexual harassment, is the act of coercing a person into sharing intimate images before threatening to release them unless money is paid. It is a specific type of blackmail. The line between sexual harassment and cyberbullying is blurred.

Some people will blackmail their classmates for nudes, threatening to release embarrassing information. They also use revenge porn and release nudes to get payback. This was the case when a 16-year-old student of W.F. West High School in Chehalis exploited more than 100 victims, many of which were his classmates. He owned over 900 photos and videos of victims.

Online sexual harassment can be so extreme that it forces women to move house, move jobs or even flee their countries as in, for example, Ethiopian feminists facing digital gender-based violence.

== Methods used ==
Research has identified basic guidelines to help recognize and deal with what is regarded as abuse of electronic communications.

- Cyberbullying involves repeated behavior with intent to harm.
- Cyberbullying is perpetrated through harassment, cyberstalking, denigration (sending or posting cruel rumors and falsehoods to damage reputation and friendships), impersonation, and exclusion (intentionally and cruelly excluding someone from an online group)

Cyberbullying can be as simple as continuing to send emails or text messages harassing someone who has said they want no further contact with the sender. It may also include public actions such as repeated threats, sexual remarks, pejorative labels (i.e. hate speech) or defamatory false accusations, ganging up on a victim by making the person the subject of ridicule in online forums, hacking into or vandalizing sites about a person, and posting false statements as fact aimed a discrediting or humiliating a targeted person. Cyberbullying could be limited to posting rumors about a person on the internet with the intention of bringing about hatred in others' minds or convincing others to dislike or participate in online denigration of a target. It may go to the extent of personally identifying victims of crime and publishing materials defaming or humiliating them.

Cyberbullies may disclose victims' personal data (e.g. real name, home address, or workplace/schools) on websites or forums—called doxing, or may use impersonation, creating fake accounts, comments or sites posing as their target for the purpose of publishing material in their name that defames, discredits or ridicules them. This can leave the cyberbully anonymous, which can make it difficult for them to be caught or punished for their behavior, although not all cyberbullies maintain their anonymity. Users of semi-anonymous chat websites are at high risk for cyberbullying, as it is also easy in this outlet for a cyberbully to remain anonymous. Text or instant messages and emails between friends can also constitute cyberbullying if what is said is hurtful.

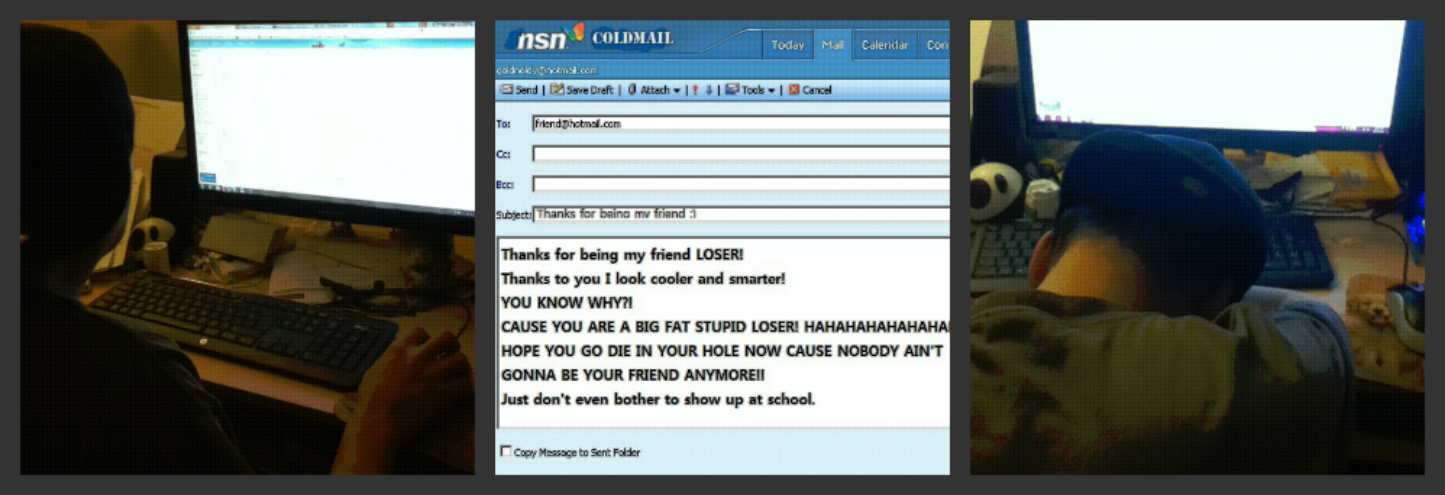
Cyberbullying by email from a fictional friend@hotmail.com

The recent rise of smartphones and mobile apps have yielded a more accessible form of cyberbullying. It is expected that cyberbullying via these platforms will occur more often than through more stationary internet platforms because of constant access to the internet. In addition, the combination of cameras and Internet access and the instant availability of these modern smartphone technologies yield specific types of cyberbullying not found in other platforms. It is likely that those cyberbullied via mobile devices will experience a wider range of cyberbullying methods than those who are exclusively bullied elsewhere.

Some teens argue that some events categorized as cyberbullying are simply drama. Danah Boyd writes, "teens regularly used that word [drama] to describe various forms of interpersonal conflict that ranged from insignificant joking around to serious jealousy-driven relational aggression. Whereas adults might have labeled many of these practices as bullying, teens saw them as drama."

=== In social media ===
Cyberbullying can take place on social media sites such as Facebook, Myspace, and Twitter. "By 2008, 93% of young people between the ages of 12 and 17 were online. In fact, youth spend more time with media than any single other activity besides sleeping." The last decade has witnessed a surge of cyberbullying, which is categorized as bullying that occurs through the use of electronic communication technologies, such as e-mail, instant messaging, social media, online gaming, or through digital messages or images sent to a cellular phone.

Cyberbullying has been shown to be more distressing and have more serious implications than conventional bullying, and it is gaining considerable social and public policy attention and requires more attention from researchers and stakeholders. Despite rapidly growing body of research on cyberbullying over the past few decades, little research has considered and distinguished the roles of cyberbullying and risk/protective factors associated with it.

There are many risks attached to social media sites, and cyberbullying is one of the larger risks. One million children were harassed, threatened or subjected to other forms of cyberbullying on Facebook during the past year, while 90 percent of social-media–using teens who have witnessed online cruelty say they have ignored mean behavior on social media, and 35 percent have done so frequently. Ninety-five percent of social-media–using teens who have witnessed cruel behavior on social networking sites say they have seen others ignoring the mean behavior, and 55 percent have witnessed this frequently. Terms like "Facebook depression" have been coined specifically in regard to the result of extended social media use, with cyberbullying playing a large part in this.

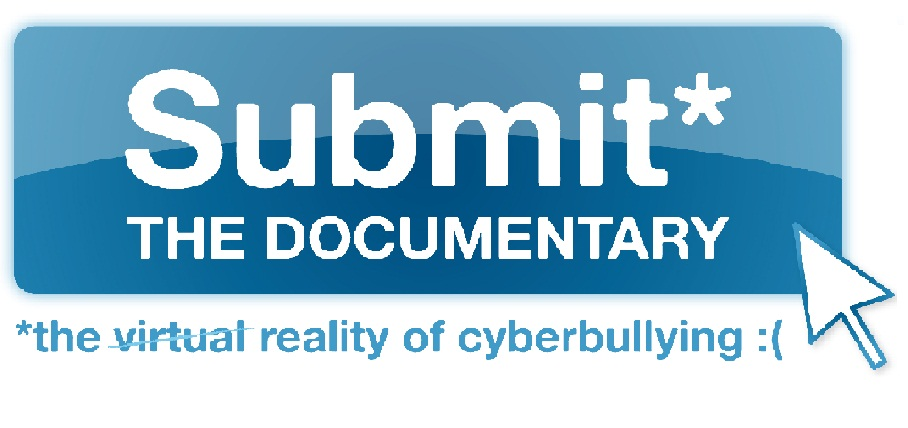
Submit the Documentary: The Virtual Reality of Cyberbullying. An award-winning documentary about the effects of cyberbullying that is shown in schools across the globe.

Cyberbullying has become more prevalent in recent years due to the technology to which children have widespread access. The most common apps that teenagers use to cyberbully are Instagram, Twitter, and Snapchat. Cyberbullying has become harder to stop because parents and teachers are unaware of when and where it is happening. A 2006 study found that 45% of teens and 30% of adolescents were cyberbullied while at school. This was linked to the reason students had access to their online devices such as cell phones or computers. Teens will say awful things to one another online and what they do not realize is that once it is said and published online it will not go away. Home used to be a safe place for teens, but now a child is still within reach of becoming a victim of cyberbullying – whether it is through YouTube, Ask.fm, or a text message. Wherever you face, it is easy to come across Cyberbullying making it almost impossible to escape.

According to a 2013 Pew Research study, eight out of ten teens who use social media now share more information about themselves than they have in the past. This includes their location, images, and contact information. In order to protect children, it is important that personal information such as age, birthday, school/church, phone number, etc. be kept confidential.

Cyberbullying can also take place through the use of websites belonging to certain groups to effectively request the targeting of another individual or group. An example of this is the bullying of climate scientists and activists.

=== In gaming ===
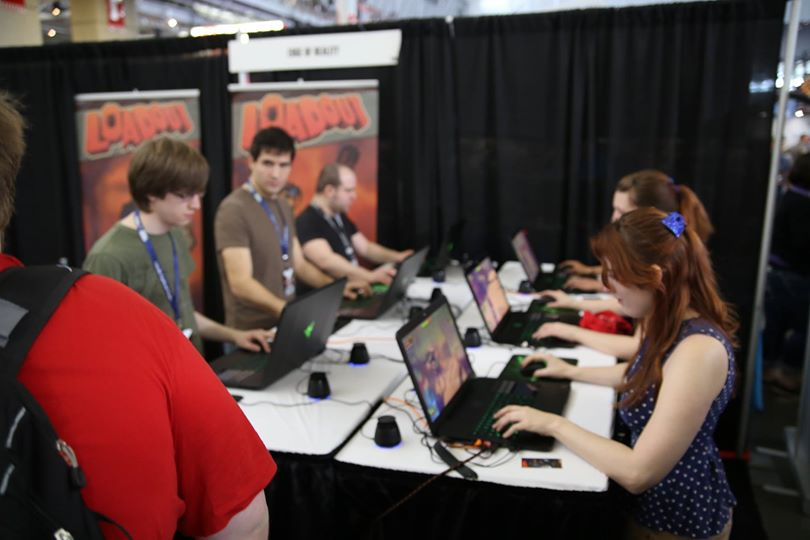
Harassment in gaming culture can occur in online gaming.

Of those who reported having experienced online harassment in a Pew Research poll, 16% said the most recent incident had occurred in an online game. A study from National Sun Yat-sen University observed that children who enjoyed violent video games were significantly more likely to both experience and perpetrate cyberbullying.

Another study that discusses the direct correlation between exposure to violent video games and cyber bullying also took into account personal factors such as "duration of playing online games, alcohol consumption in the last 3 months, parents drunk in the last 3 months, anger, hostility, ADHD, and a sense of belonging" as potential contributing factors of cyberbullying.

Gaming was a more common venue for men in which to experience harassment, whereas women's harassment tended to occur more via social media. Most respondents considered gaming culture to be equally welcoming to both genders, though 44% thought it favored men. Sexual harassment in gaming generally involves slurs directed towards women, sex role stereotyping, and overaggressive language. Keza MacDonald writes in The Guardian that sexism exists in gaming culture, but is not mainstream within it. U.S. President Barack Obama made reference to the harassment of women gamers during his remarks in honor of Women's History Month.

Competitive gaming scenes have been less welcoming of women than has broader gaming culture. In an internet-streamed fighting game competition, one female gamer forfeited a match after the coach of her team, Aris Bakhtanians, stated, "The sexual harassment is part of the culture. If you remove that from the fighting game community, it's not the fighting game community." The comments were widely condemned by gamers, with comments in support of sexual harassment "drowned out by a vocal majority of people expressing outrage, disappointment and sympathy." The incident built momentum for action to counter sexual harassment in gaming.

Some game developers have been subjected to harassment and death threats by players upset by changes to a game or by a developer's online policies. Harassment also occurs in reaction to critics such as Jack Thompson or Anita Sarkeesian, whom some fans see as threats to the medium. Various people have been harassed in connection with the Gamergate controversy. Harassment related to gaming is not of a notably different severity or tenor compared to online harassment motivated by other subcultures or advocacy issues. Other developers have been harassed simply due to misogyny or anti-LGBTQ+ stances. A notable case was the death of "Near", the developer of Higan, a console emulator, who took their own life after becoming the subject to ridicule from members of the online Kiwi Farms board following their announcement of being nonbinary.

Sabotage among rival crowdfunding campaigns is a recurring problem for projects related to gaming.

Some instances of swatting in games such as Call of Duty and League of Legends have resulted in law enforcement SWAT units called on individuals' homes as a prank. On December 28, 2017, Wichita, Kansas, police officers killed Andrew Finch at his Kansas home in a reported swatting prank.

=== In search engines ===
Information cascades happen when users start passing along information they assume to be true, but cannot know to be true, based on information on what other users are doing. This can be accelerated by search engines' ranking technologies and their tendency to return results relevant to a user's previous interests. This type of information spreading is hard to stop. Information cascades over social media and the Internet may also be harmless, and may contain truthful information.

Bullies use Google bombs (a term applicable to any search engine) to increase the prominence of favored posts sorted by the most popular searches, done by linking to those posts from as many other web pages as possible. Examples include the campaign for the neologism "santorum" organized by the LGBT lobby. Google bombs can manipulate the Internet's search engines regardless of how authentic the pages are, but there is a way to counteract this type of manipulation as well.

=== In dating apps ===
Dating app users who are victims of cyberbullying encounter a range of harmful behaviors, including catfishing, the uninvited sharing of personal images, and offensive remarks. These activities not only violate personal boundaries but also have a detrimental impact on the victims' mental health.

Research by the Pew Research Center highlights how common this issue is, finding that almost 60% of female users between the ages of 18 and 34 have received unsolicited sexual messages or photographs on dating apps. Moreover, it was found that 36% of American users of dating apps have been the victim of online abuse. Dating app users are more likely to experience hate speech and cyberbullying because of this rate, which is almost twice as high as the whole American population. In addition to sexual harassment, other forms of cyberbullying and hate speech are among the most frequent forms of harassment that users of these sites report experiencing.

The fundamental safety and trust that underlie online dating sites' functionality are compromised by these upsetting encounters. Victims may experience significant effects, including elevated stress and anxiety levels and, in certain cases, chronic psychological trauma.

=== Online shaming ===
Online shaming is a form of public shaming in which targets are publicly humiliated on the internet, via social media platforms (e.g. Twitter or Facebook), or more localized media (e.g. email groups). As online shaming frequently involves exposing private information on the Internet, the ethics of public humiliation has been a source of debate over Internet privacy and media ethics. Online shaming takes many forms, including call-outs, cancellation (cancel culture), doxing, negative reviews, and revenge porn.

== Famous cyberbullying cases ==
There are many famous cases of cyberbullying online (e.g. Daisy Coleman).

Although most people may not realize it, some of these internet "memes" actually show cyberbullying in action.

=== Star Wars Kid ===
Uploaded in 2003, the star of the video, Ghyslain Raza (a 9th grader at the time) is shown messing around and waving around a golf ball retriever as if it is a real Jedi lightsaber. He was helping his friend parody the movie Star Wars. The video was uploaded to YouTube several months later by Raza's classmates without his knowledge or permission. The video blew up and became one of the first viral internet memes. The video accumulated 900 million views.

Despite trying to protect his privacy, Raza was mocked both online and in real life. He was body shamed, doxxed, and told to commit suicide, among other things. Students at school leaped onto tables to mock him, and his video was parodied on multiple shows including South Park. Raza had to move schools multiple times, and became homeschooled. He was harassed for years over a video he did not upload. Today, he is working on a documentary talking about his internet fame and the harassment that came along with it. He wants to focus on internet privacy and consent.

== Law enforcement ==
A majority of states have laws that explicitly include electronic forms of communication within stalking or harassment laws. Most law enforcement agencies have cyber-crime units, and Internet stalking is often treated with more seriousness than reports of physical stalking. Help and resources can be searched by state or area.

=== Schools ===
The safety of online privacy issues in schools is increasingly becoming a focus of state legislative action. There was an increase in cyberbullying enacted legislation between 2006 and 2010. Initiatives and curriculum requirements also exist in the UK (the Ofsted eSafety guidance) and Australia (Overarching Learning Outcome 13).

In 2012, a group of teenagers in a design class New Haven, Connecticut, developed an application to help fight bullying, "Back Off Bully" (BOB). This is an anonymous resource for computer, smart phone or iPad, designed so when someone witnesses or is the victim of bullying, they can immediately report the incident. The app asks questions about time, location and how the bullying is happening, as well as provides positive action and empowerment regarding the incident. The reported information goes to a database, where it may be studied by administrators. Common threads are spotted so others can intervene and break the bully's pattern. "Back Off Bully" is being considered as standard operating procedure at schools across Connecticut, while recent studies carried out among 66 high school teachers have concluded that prevention programs have proved ineffective to date.

Teachers can also be cyberbullied by pupils, as well as by parents and other school staff.

=== Protection ===
There are laws that only address online harassment of children or focus on child predators, as well as laws that protect adult cyberstalking victims, or victims of any age. Currently, there are 45 cyberstalking (and related) laws on the books. While some sites specialize in laws that protect victims age 18 and under, Working to Halt Online Abuse is a help resource containing a list of current and pending cyberstalking-related United States federal and state laws. It also lists those states that do not yet have laws, and related laws from other countries. The Global Cyber Law Database (GCLD) aims to become the most comprehensive and authoritative source of cyber laws for all countries.

Several states, including Florida, California, and Missouri have passed laws against cyberbullying. California prohibits the use of an electronic device to cause someone to fear for their life. In Florida, the "Jeffrey Johnson Stand Up for All Students Act" prohibits any type of bullying including cyberbullying. In Missouri, anyone who violently threatens someone over social media can be convicted with a Class A misdemeanor, but if the victim is seventeen years or younger, they can be convicted with a Class D felony.

== Demographics ==
Two studies from 2014 found that 80% of body-shaming tweets are sent by women, who also account for 50% of misogynistic tweets.

=== Age ===
Children report negative online behaviors occurring from the second grade. According to research, boys initiate negative online activity earlier than girls. However, by middle school, girls are more likely to engage in cyberbullying than boys. Whether the bully is male or female, the purpose of childhood bullying is to intentionally embarrass, harass, intimidate, or make threats online.

Studies on the psycho-social effects of cyberspace have begun to monitor the effects cyberbullying may have on the victims. Consequences of cyberbullying are multi-faceted, and affect both online and offline behavior. Research on adolescents reported that changes in the victims' behavior as a result of cyberbullying could potentially be positive. Victims "created a cognitive pattern of bullies, which consequently helped them to recognize aggressive people."

However, the Journal of Psychosocial Research on Cyberspace abstract reports critical impacts in almost all of the respondents, taking the form of lower self-esteem, loneliness, disillusionment, and distrust of people. The more extreme effects included self-harm. Children have killed each other and committed suicide after cyberbullying incidents. Some cases of digital self-harm have been reported in which an individual engages in cyberbullying against themselves, or purposefully and knowingly exposes themselves to cyberbullying.

=== Adults ===
Cyberstalking may be an extension of physical stalking and may have criminal consequences. A target's understanding of why cyberstalking is happening is helpful to remedy and take protective action. Among factors that motivate stalkers are envy, pathological obsession (professional or sexual), unemployment or failure with own job or life, or the desire to intimidate and cause others to feel inferior. The stalker may be delusional and believe they "know" the target. The stalker wants to instill fear in a person to justify their status, or may believe they can get away with these actions due to online anonymity.

The US federal cyberstalking law is designed to prosecute people for using electronic means to repeatedly harass or threaten someone online. There are resources dedicated to helping adult victims deal with cyberbullies legally and effectively. One of the steps recommended is to record everything and contact police. In Mexico, Olimpia Coral Melo, promoted the creation of a law against digital harassment that took her name, the Olimpia Law.

=== Gender ===
Research conducted to try to determine differences in cyberbullying patterns comparing male to female and ages of each are relatively inconclusive. There are some factors that lean towards males being more involved in cyberbullying behaviors due to males tending to have more aggressive behaviors than females. This is not proven, but speculated based on literature reviews of research indicating that significant data is self-reported. Comparatively, the review of articles indicates that age differences have some indicators of cyberbullying; increasing age indicates increasing bullying behaviors. Gender differences have mixed results, but one finding indicated that younger females (10 or 11) and older males (13+) tend to engage in cyber bullying behaviors.

Cyberbullies mostly have at least one common trait. Cyberbullies generally get angry and discouraged easily and usually have strong personalities. They connect with others belligerently and do not care for the feelings of their victims. Both males and females engage in cyberbullying. Females are involved in cyberbullying just as much as males, and females are sometimes even found more involved in cyberbullying than males are. The reason behind this is because of the way they respond; men will usually respond with physical retaliation, while women will use "indirect forms such as gossiping." As cyberbullying is a more indirect form, women are more likely to be involved.

Also, women tend to have less face-to-face confrontations than men, and since cyberbullying occurs online, this allows women to have a greater chance to be attacked. According to a 2017 Pew Research study on online harassment, 14% of Americans have been harassed because of their political views. Such harassment affects men and women differently; men are approximately twice as likely as women to have experienced online harassment because of their political views. However, women politicians are disproportionately more likely to be sexually harassed online. Women lawmakers are three times more likely than their male counterparts to receive sexually abusive comments, including threats of rape, beatings, death, or abduction.

== Research ==
=== Australia ===
The nationwide Australian Covert Bullying Prevalence Survey (Cross et al., 2009) assessed cyberbullying experiences among 7,418 students. The results indicated that rates of cyberbullying increased with age, with 4.9% of students in Year 4 reporting cyberbullying compared to 7.9% in year nine. Cross et al., (2009) reported that rates of bullying and harassing others were lower, but also increased with age. Only 1.2% of Year 4 students reported cyberbullying others compared to 5.6% of Year 9 students.

=== China ===
In mainland China, cyberbullying has yet to receive adequate scholarly attention. A study investigating the risk factors of cyberbullying sampled 1,438 high school students from central China. Data showed that 34.84% had participated in bullying and 56.88% had been bullied online.

A study on cyberbullying in Hong Kong chose 48 out of 7,654 students from elementary school to high school who were classified as potential aggressors related to cyberbullying. 31 out of 48 students declared they barely participated in cyber-attacks. It is common among high school students (28 out of 36 students) to participate in social media platforms; 58% admitted to changing a nickname for others, 56.3% to humiliation, 54.2% to making fun of someone, and 54.2% to spreading rumors. The Hong Kong Federation of Youth Groups interviewed 1,820 teenagers, 17.5% of whom indicated having experienced cyberbullying. This included insults, abuse, and the publishing of personal private pictures on social media without permission.

=== European Union ===
In a study published in 2011, across 25 EU member states studied, an average 6% of children (9–16 years old) had been bullied and only 3% of them confessed to having been a bully. However, in an earlier publication by Hasenbrink et al. (2009), reporting on the results from a meta analysis from European Union countries, the authors estimated (via median results) that approximately 18% of European young people had been "bullied/harassed/stalked" via the internet and mobile phones. Cyberharassment rates for young people across the EU member states ranged from 10% to 52%.

=== Finland ===
Sourander et al. (2010) conducted a population-based cross-sectional study that took place in Finland. The authors of this study took the self-reports of 2,215 Finish adolescents between the ages of 13 and 16 about cyberbullying and cybervictimization during the previous six months. It was found that, amongst the total sample, 4.8% were victims only, 7.4% were cyberbullies only, and 5.4% were cyberbully-victims.

The authors of this study were able to conclude that cyberbullying, as well as cybervictimization, is associated not only with psychiatric issues, but with psychosomatic issues as well. Many adolescents in the study reported headaches or difficulty sleeping. The authors believe that their results indicate a greater need for new ideas on how to prevent cyberbullying and what to do when it occurs. It is clearly a worldwide problem that needs to be taken seriously.

=== Ireland ===
The Health Behaviour in School-aged Children (HBSC) pilot survey was carried out in eight post-primary schools across Ireland, including 318 students aged 15–18. 59% were boys and 41% were girls. Participation in this survey was voluntary for students, and consent had to be obtained from parents, students and the school itself. This survey was anonymous and confidential, and it took 40 minutes to complete. It asked questions on traditional forms of bullying, as well as cyberbullying, risk behaviors and self-reported health and life satisfaction.

66% of the students said that they had never been bullied, 14% had been victims of traditional forms of bullying, 10% had been victims of cyberbullying, and the remaining 10% had been victims of both traditional forms of bullying and cyberbullying. Boys mostly said they were victims of traditional forms of bullying, and girls mostly were victims of both traditional forms of bullying and cyberbullying. 20% of the students in this survey said that they had been cyberbullied, showing that cyberbullying is on the rise.

Arrow DIT claims that 23% of 9–16 year olds in Ireland have been bullied online or offline, compared to 19% in Europe. Although online bullying in Ireland stands at 4% according to Arrow DIT, this is lower than the European average, which stands at 6%, and half that of the UK where 8% reported being cyberbullied. Traditional forms of bullying in Ireland occur more often than in Europe.

A 2018 study by Dublin City University (DCU)'s National Anti-Bullying Research and Resource Centre (ABC) found that almost 10% of post-primary teachers were victims of cyberbullying, and 15% knew of a colleague who had experienced it in the previous 12 months. 59% of the bullying was by pupils, mainly on social media, with the rest perpetrated by parents and other school staff. Various effects on bullied teachers included increased stress and anxiety, "negative impacts on their working environment, and a reluctance to report the issue and seek help from management".

=== Japan ===
According to recent research, in Japan, 17 percent (compared with a 25-country average of 37 percent) of youth between the ages of 8 and 17 have been victims of online bullying. The number shows that online bullying is a serious concern in Japan. Teenagers who spend more than 10 hours a week on the Internet are more likely to become the targets of online bullying, though only 28 percent of the survey participants understood what cyberbullying is. However, they do know the severity of the issue; 63 percent of the surveyed students worried about being targeted as victims of cyberbullying.

Since teenagers find themselves congregating socially on the internet via social media, they become easy targets for cyberbullying. Cyberbullying may occur via email, text, chat rooms, and social media websites. Some cyberbullies set up websites or blogs to post the target's images, publicize their personal information, gossip about the target, express why they hate the target, request people to agree with the bully's view, and send links to the target to make sure they are watching the activity.

Much cyberbullying is an act of relational aggression, which involves alienating the victim from peers through gossip or ostracism. This kind of attack can be easily launched via texting or other online activities. One 19-year-old Japanese student was targeted by classmates who posted his photo online, insulted him constantly, and asked him to die. Because of the constant harassment, he did attempt suicide twice. Even when he quit school, the attacks did not stop.

Cyberbullying can cause serious psychological impact to the victims. They often feel anxious, nervous, tired, and depressed. Other examples of negative psychological trauma include losing confidence as a result of being socially isolated from their schoolmates or friends. Psychological problems can also show up in the form of headaches, skin problems, abdominal pain, sleep problems, bed-wetting, and crying. It may also lead victims to commit suicide to end the bullying.

=== United States ===
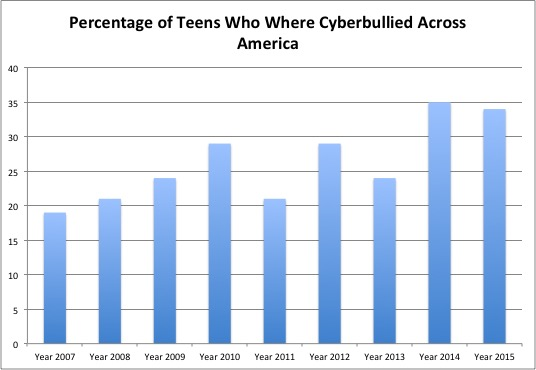
Percentage of victims of cyberbullying by year across the United States

==== 2000 ====
A 2000 survey by the Crimes Against Children Research Center at the University of New Hampshire found that 6% of the young people who completed the survey had experienced some form of harassment, including threats and negative rumors, and 2% had suffered distressing harassment.

==== 2004 ====
The 2004 I-Safe.org survey of 1,500 students between grades 4 and 8 found:

- 42% of children had been bullied online. One in four had experienced it more than once.
- 35% had been threatened online. Nearly one in five had experienced it more than once.
- 21% had received mean or threatening e-mails or other messages.
- 58% admitted that someone had said hurtful things to them online. More than four out of ten said this had happened more than once.
- 58% had not told their parents or an adult about something hurtful that had happened to them online.

==== 2005 ====
The Youth Internet Safety Survey–2, conducted by the Crimes Against Children Research Center at the University of New Hampshire in 2005, found that 9% of the young people in the survey had experienced some form of harassment. The survey was a nationally representative telephone survey of 1,500 youth 10–17 years old. One-third reported feeling distressed by the incident, with distress being more likely for younger respondents and those who were the victims of aggressive harassment (including being telephoned, sent gifts, or visited at home by the harasser). Compared to youth not harassed online, victims are more likely to have social problems. On the other hand, youth who harass others are more likely to have problems with rule breaking and aggression.

Hinduja and Patchin completed a study in the summer of 2005 of approximately 1,500 Internet-using adolescents and found that over one-third of youth reported being victimized online, and over 16% of respondents admitted to cyberbullying others. While most of the instances of cyberbullying involved relatively minor behavior (41% were disrespected, 19% were called names), over 12% were physically threatened and about 5% were scared for their safety. Notably, fewer than 15% of victims told an adult about the incident. Additional research by Hinduja and Patchin in 2007 found that youth who report being victims of cyberbullying also experience stress or strain that is related to offline problem behaviors such as running away from home, cheating on a test, skipping school, or using alcohol or marijuana. The authors acknowledge that both of these studies provide only preliminary information about the nature and consequences of online bullying, due to the methodological challenges associated with an online survey.

According to a 2005 survey by the National Children's Home charity and Tesco Mobile, of 770 youth between the ages of 11 and 19, 20% of respondents revealed that they had been bullied via electronic means. Almost three-quarters (73%) stated that they knew the bully, while 26% stated that the offender was a stranger. 10% of responders indicated that another person had taken a picture and/or video of them via a cellular phone camera, consequently making them feel uncomfortable, embarrassed, or threatened. Many youths are not comfortable telling an authority figure about their cyberbullying victimization for fear their access to technology will be taken from them; while 24% and 14% told a parent or teacher respectively, 28% did not tell anyone, and 41% told a friend.

==== 2006 ====
According to the 2006 Harris Interactive Cyberbullying Research Report, commissioned by the National Crime Prevention Council, cyberbullying is a problem that "affects almost half of all American teens".

==== 2007 ====
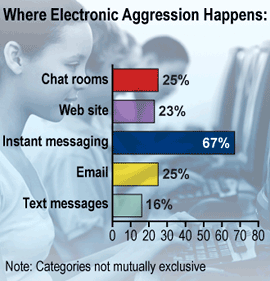
Distribution of cyberbullying venues used by young people in the US, according to the Centers for Disease Control

Studies published in 2007 in the Journal of Adolescent Health indicated young people reporting being victims of electronic aggression in a range of 9% to 35%.

In 2007, Debbie Heimowitz, a Stanford University master's student, created Adina's Deck, a film based on Stanford-accredited research. She worked in focus groups for ten weeks in three schools to learn about the problem of cyberbullying in northern California. The findings determined that over 60% of students had been cyberbullied and were victims of cyberbullying. The film is now being used in classrooms nationwide as it was designed around learning goals pertaining to problems that students had understanding the topic. The middle school of Megan Meier is reportedly using the film as a solution to the crisis in their town.

==== 2008 ====
In 2008, researchers Sameer Hinduja (Florida Atlantic University) and Justin Patchin (University of Wisconsin-Eau Claire) published a book on cyberbullying that summarized the current state of cyberbullying research (Bullying Beyond the Schoolyard: Preventing and Responding to Cyberbullying). Their research documented that cyberbullying instances had been increasing over the preceding several years. They also reported findings from a then-recent study of cyberbullying. In a random sample of approximately 2000 middle-school students from a large school district in the southern United States, about 10% of respondents reported being cyberbullied in the previous 30 days while over 17% reported having been cyberbullied at least once in their lifetime. While these rates are slightly lower than some of the findings from their previous research, Hinduja and Patchin pointed out that the earlier studies were predominantly conducted among older adolescents and Internet samples; that is, older youth use the Internet more frequently and are more likely to experience cyberbullying than younger children.

==== 2011 ====
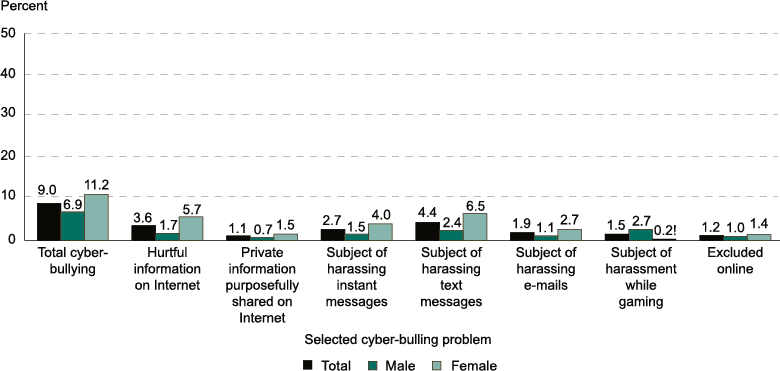
Students aged 12–18 who reported being cyberbullied anywhere during the school year 2011

According to the 2011 National Crime Victimization Survey, conducted by the U.S. Department of Justice, Bureau of Justice Statistics, School Crime Supplement (SCS), 9% of students age 12–18 admitted to having experienced cyberbullying during that school year (with a coefficient of variation between 30% and 50%).

==== 2013 ====
In the Youth Risk Behavior Survey 2013, the Center for Surveillance, Epidemiology, and Laboratory Services of the Centers for Disease Control and Prevention published results of its survey as part of the Youth Risk Behavior Surveillance System (YRBSS) in June 2014, indicating the percentage of school children being bullied through e-mail, chat rooms, instant messaging, websites, or texting ("electronically bullied") during the course of 2013.

By race/ethnicity and sex
Race/ethnicity	Female	95% confidence interval	Male	95% confidence interval	Total	95% confidence interval
White, non-Hispanic	25.2%	22.6%–28.0%	8.7%	7.5%–10.1%	16.9%	15.3%–18.7%
Black, non-Hispanic	10.5%	8.7%–12.6%	6.9%	5.2%–9.0%	8.7%	7.3%–10.4%
Hispanic	17.1%	14.5%–20.15	8.3%	6.9%–10.0%	12.8%	10.9%–14.9%
Total	21.0%	19.2%–22.9%	8.5%	7.7%–9.5%	14.8%	13.7%–15.9%

By grade and sex
Grade	Female	95% confidence interval	Male	95% confidence interval	Total	95% confidence interval
9	22.8%	19.5%–26.6%	9.4%	7.9%–11.1%	16.1%	14.1%–18.2%
10	21.9%	18.7%–25.5%	7.2%	5.4%–9.6%	14.5%	12.6%–16.6%
11	20.6%	17.4%–24.3%	8.9%	7.3%–10.7%	14.9%	13.0%–16.9%
12	18.3%	16.3%–20.5%	8.6%	7.0%–10.5%	13.5%	12.2%–14.9%

==== 2014 ====
In 2014, Mehari, Farrell, and Le published a study that focused on the literature on cyberbullying among adolescents. They found that researchers have generally assumed that cyberbullying is distinct from aggression perpetrated in person. Mehari et al. suggest that the media through which aggression is perpetrated may be best conceptualized as a new classification of aggression, rather than considering cyberbullying as a distinct counterpart to existing forms of aggression. They suggest that future research on cyberbullying be considered within the context of theoretical and empirical knowledge of aggression in adolescence.

Mary Howlett-Brandon's doctoral dissertation analyzed the National Crime Victimization Survey: Student Crime Supplement, 2009, to focus on the cyberbullying victimization of Black and White students in specific conditions.

==== 2015 ====
Cyberbullying on social media has usually been student-to-student, but recently, students have been cyberbullying their teachers. High school students in Colorado created a Twitter site that bullies teachers. This ranges from obscenities to false accusations of inappropriate actions with students.

== Legislation ==
=== Jurisdictions ===
==== United States ====
Legislation geared at penalizing cyberbullying has been introduced in a number of U.S. states including New York, Missouri, Rhode Island and Maryland. At least 45 states have passed laws against digital harassment. Dardenne Prairie of Springfield, Missouri, passed a city ordinance making online harassment a misdemeanor. The city of St. Charles, Missouri passed a similar ordinance. Missouri is among the states where lawmakers are pursuing state legislation, with task forces expected to have cyberbullying laws drafted and implemented. In June 2008, Rep. Linda Sanchez (D-Calif.) and Rep. Kenny Hulshof (R-Mo.) proposed a federal law that would criminalize acts of cyberbullying.

Lawmakers are seeking to address cyberbullying with new legislation because there is currently no specific law on the books that deals with it. A fairly new federal cyberstalking law might address such acts, according to Parry Aftab, but no one has been prosecuted under it yet. The proposed federal law would make it illegal to use electronic means to "coerce, intimidate, harass or cause other substantial emotional distress."

In August 2008, the California state legislature passed one of the first laws in the country to deal directly with cyberbullying. Assembly Bill 86 2008 gives school administrators the authority to discipline students for bullying, offline or online. This law took effect on January 1, 2009.

A law in New York's Albany County that criminalized cyberbullying was struck down as unconstitutional by the New York Court of Appeals in People v. Marquan M.

A recent ruling first seen in the UK determined that it is possible for an Internet service provider (ISP) to be liable for the content of the sites it hosts, setting a precedent that any ISP should treat a notice of complaint seriously and investigate it immediately.

18 U.S.C. § 875(c) criminalizes the making of threats via the Internet.

While some states have laws that require schools to mediate cyberbullying conflicts, several states have been sued on First Amendment grounds for doing so. By examining the decisions of three such lawsuits heard in lower courts, Alvin J. Primack and Kevin A. Johnson argued that current First Amendment doctrine, particularly the case of Morse v. Frederick (2007), may offer interpretive resources for justifying administrative reach to some online digital speech. They concluded, "[w]ithout clearer standards, school administrators are likely to feel constrained and err on the side of inaction."

==== United Kingdom ====
The United Kingdom does not have anti-bullying legislation. However, it does have the Protection From Harassment Act, an anti-stalking law. U.K. courts have used this legislation in bullying cases.

In early February 2022, ministers of the UK parliament planned to add to their proposed Online Safety Bill several criminal offences against those who send death threats online or deliberately share dangerous disinformation about fake Covid cures. Other new offences, such as revenge porn, posts advertising people-smuggling, and messages encouraging people to commit suicide, would fall under the responsibilities of online platforms like Facebook and Twitter to tackle.

==== Philippines ====
The Cybercrime Prevention Act of 2012 defines cyberlibel as a punishable offence under Section 355 of the Revised Penal Code of 1930.

==== European Union ====
Since the 1990s, the United Kingdom and other European countries have been working to solve workplace bullying since there is no legislation regulating cyberbullying. The pervasive nature of technology has made the act of bullying online much easier. A 24-hour internet connection gives bullies a neverending opportunity to find and bully victims. Employers in the European Union have more legal responsibility to their employees than do those in other countries. Since employers do not have the ability to fire or hire an employee at will like in the United States, employers in Europe are held to a high standard in how their employees are treated.

In 2007, the European Union developed the Framework Agreement on Harassment and Violence at Work, a law that prevents bullying occurring in the workplace and holds employers accountable for providing fair working conditions. The law defines the responsibilities of an employer such as protecting their employees from bullies in a work environment and the psychological pain a victim faces from bullies during business hours. Lawyers pursuing cyberbullying cases use the Ordinance on Victimization at Work law, since there are not any laws specifically condemning cyberbullying.

In 1993, Sweden was the first European Union country to have a law against cyberbullying. The Ordinance on Victimization at Work protected victims from "recurrent reprehensible or distinctly negative actions which are directed which are directed against individual employees in an offensive manner and can result in those employees being placed outside the workplace community".

In 2002, France passed the Social Modernization Law, which added consequences to the French Labor Code for cyberbullying such as holding employers accountable for their involvement in harassment. The legislation defines "moral harassment" as "repeated acts leading to a deterioration of the working conditions and that are likely to harm the dignity, the physical or psychological heath of the victim or his professional career."

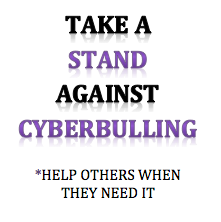
This image portrays the support and awareness that many anti-cyberbullying campaigns have in some countries around the world.

The United States and some other countries have more extensive legislation on cyberbullying than the European Union. Cyberbullying incidents on social media are widespread and have increased drastically in number. However, the process of getting a claim against a bully is not an easy one because of the victim's need to provide sufficient evidence to prove the existence of bullying.

As of mid-2015, countries in the European Union were in the process of creating laws specially related to cyberbullying. Since the process takes time, the government is supporting school programs to promote internet safety with the help of teachers and parents. This will allow the government to take the time it needs to create the cyberbullying laws while helping safeguard students from cyberbullying as much as possible.

==== China ====
In China, cyberbullying legislation has focused specifically on online harassment and online abuse. In 2023, Chinese justice agencies published the Guiding Opinions on Punishing Cyberviolence Violations and Crimes in Accordance with Law, which in American and British English translates to the Enforcing Online Harassment Prevention Enforcement Guidelines. The guidelines set out rules for applying criminal, civil, and administrative law to conduct such as online harassment, defamation, doxing, and coordinated harassment campaigns. They specify that online defamation, organized doxing, or using social media to monetize or share abusive content can be prosecuted as crimes, while online service providers that fail to manage such content may themselves be subject to prosecution for refusing to effectively moderate their platforms. The guidelines also empower prosecutors to take action when online harassment or defamation undermines social order or national interests, and provide for procedures such as injunctions, civil damages, and enhanced penalties where victims suffer severe harm or the conduct is particularly harmful to society.

===== Spain =====
The prevalence of cyberbullying among adolescents in Spain is low in comparison to the rest of the world, with recent studies indicating rates of 3% and global estimates indicating closer to 5%. However, Spanish adolescents who engage in cyberbullying tend to also engage in traditional forms of bullying; 30% of Spanish adolescents engaging in cyberbullying also engaged in bullying. Several key risk factors for cyberbullying in Spain include: moral disengagement, peer group, and poor anger control.

These factors are present for both Spanish male and female adolescents, although boys generally exhibited greater levels of involvement. For example, boys mean score in cyberbullying behaviors was 0.15 and girls was 0.11. These findings suggest that adolescents who justify violence, feel pressure from peers, and exhibit poor emotional regulation, engage in cyberbullying.

=== Research on preventive legislation ===
Researchers suggest that programs be put in place for prevention of cyberbullying. These programs would be incorporated into school curricula and would include online safety and instruction on how to use the Internet properly. This could teach the victim proper methods of potentially avoiding the cyberbully, such as blocking messages or increasing the security of their computer.

Even in a perfect world, no crime can be stopped fully. That is why it is suggested that within this prevention method, effective coping strategies should be introduced and adopted. People can adopt coping strategies to combat future cyberbullying. Coping strategies may include social support groups composed of victims of cyberbullying, which could allow students to share their stories, and remove the feeling of being alone.

Teachers should be involved in all prevention educational models, as they are essentially the "police" of the classroom. Most cyberbullying often goes unreported as the victim feels nothing can be done to help in their current situation. However, if given the proper tools with preventive measures and more power in the classroom, teachers can be of assistance; if the parent, teacher, and victim can work together, solutions may be found.

There have been many legislative attempts to facilitate the control of bullying and cyberbullying. Some existing legislation is incorrectly thought to be tied to bullying and cyberbullying (including terms such as "libel" and "slander"). The problem is that the existing legislation does not directly apply to bullying, nor define it as its own criminal behavior. Anti-cyberbullying advocates have even expressed concern about the broad scope of some of the bills attempted to be passed.

In the United States, attempts have been made to pass legislation against cyberbullying. Few states attempted to pass broad sanctions in an effort to prohibit cyberbullying. Problems include how to define cyberbullying and cyberstalking, and, if charges are pressed, whether this violates the bully's freedom of speech. B. Walther said that "Illinois is the only state to criminalize 'electronic communication(s) sent for the purpose of harassing another person' when the activity takes place outside a public school setting." This was criticized for infringement on freedom of speech.

Preventing a child from being cyberbullied is hard, but now they are working to form programs and laws to help stop the issue from getting worse than it already is. They have created movies such as Cyberbully by Charles Biname and The Duff by Ari Sandel for teenagers to watch and see how cyberbullying can affect an individual. Children that are victims of this problem feel they can not go to an adult for help because they may feel embarrassed by the situation. Bullying online will not only hurt the teenager emotionally, but there is also a risk of the child hurting themselves physically as well; in 2017, suicide was the tenth leading cause of death among persons in the United States.

Being able to tell if a child is being hurt from this issue can be tough, but there are certain things that a child will do that should give a red flag that they are being bullied. A cyberbully could have said nasty words to that child and the victim could be looking for compliments. If the victim is always online wondering when the bully will strike next that could also be a sign. Being an active parent in their children's lives will make a difference on whether their child is experiencing online bullying or not. Also bringing police involved in the case will be a problem solver too.

== Harmful effects ==
Research has demonstrated a number of serious consequences of cyberbullying victimization. Victims may have lower self-esteem, increased suicidal ideation, and a variety of emotional responses, including being scared, frustrated, angry, and depressed. Cyberbullying may be more harmful than traditional bullying, because there is no escaping it. One of the most damaging effects is that a victim begins to avoid friends and activities, which is often the very intention of the bully.

Cyberbullying campaigns are sometimes so damaging that victims have committed suicide. There are at least four examples in the United States in which cyberbullying has been linked to the suicide of a teenager. The suicide of Megan Meier is an example that led to the conviction of the adult perpetrator of the attacks. Holly Grogan committed suicide by jumping off a 30-foot bridge near Gloucester in the UK. It was reported that a number of her schoolmates had posted a number of hateful messages on her Facebook page.

According to Lucie Russell, director of campaigns, policy and participation at youth mental health charity Young Minds, young people who suffer from mental disorders are vulnerable to cyberbullying as they are sometimes unable to shrug it off:

When someone says nasty things healthy people can filter that out, they're able to put a block between that and their self-esteem. But mentally unwell people don't have the strength and the self-esteem to do that, to separate it, and so it gets compiled with everything else. To them, it becomes the absolute truth – there's no filter, there's no block. That person will take that on, take it as fact.

Social media has allowed bullies to disconnect from the impact they may be having on others.

=== Intimidation, emotional damage, and suicide ===
According to the Cyberbullying Research Center, "there have been several high‐profile cases involving teenagers taking their own lives in part because of being harassed and mistreated over the Internet, a phenomenon we have termed cyberbullicide – suicide indirectly or directly influenced by experiences with online aggression."

Cyberbullying is an intense form of psychological abuse, whose victims are more than twice as likely to suffer from mental disorders compared to traditional bullying.

The reluctance youth have in telling an authority figure about instances of cyberbullying has led to fatal outcomes. At least three children between the ages of 12 and 13 have committed suicide due to depression brought on by cyberbullying, according to reports by USA Today and the Baltimore Examiner. These include the suicide of Ryan Halligan and the suicide of Megan Meier, the latter of which resulted in United States v. Lori Drew. Teen suicides tied to cyberbullying have recently become more prevalent. Rebecca Ann Sedwick committed suicide after being terrorized through mobile applications such as Ask.fm, Kik Messenger and Voxer.

=== On youth and teenagers ===
The effects of cyberbullying vary, but research illustrates that cyberbullying adversely affects youth to a higher degree than adolescents and adults. Youth are more likely to suffer since they are still growing mentally and physically. Jennifer N. Caudle, a certified family physician, says, "Kids that are bullied are likely to experience anxiety, depression, loneliness, unhappiness and poor sleep".

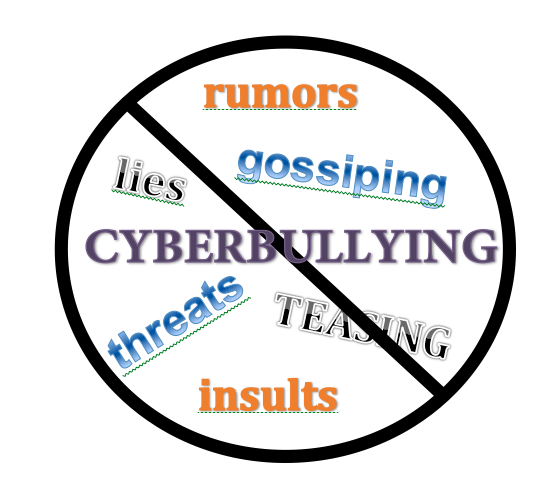
This image shows different aspects of cyberbullying that can take place on the internet which puts more emotional strain on the younger children and teenage who experience cyberbullying.

Most of the time cyberbullying goes unnoticed; the younger generation hides their bullying from anyone that can help to prevent the bullying from occurring and from getting worse. Between 20% and 40% of adolescents are victims of cyberbullying worldwide. The youth slowly change their behaviors and actions so they become more withdrawn and quiet, but this may go unnoticed since the change is subtle. Metin Deniz believes cyberbullying will "become a serious problem in the future with an increase in the Internet and mobile phone usage among young people".

If preventive actions are not taken against cyberbullying, younger children in addition to teenagers will feel more lonely and depressed along with having significant changes in their eating and sleeping patterns as well as loss of interest in their normal activities. These changes will affect their growth and development into adulthood. Younger children and teenagers are 76.2% less likely to display suicidal behaviors and thoughts, but are still at risk depending on other factors such as mental health status, home care, and relationships with others. The risk of suicide increases by 35% to 45% when victims do not have any support from anyone in their life, and cyberbullying amplifies the situation.

Young people seem particularly vulnerable to the effects of cyberbullying through anonymous social media, perhaps because adolescents are attracted to these platforms as a means of seeking validation from their peers. Abuse on these platforms, such as ASKfm, Yik Yak and Sarahah, can be particularly keenly felt by young people, leading to issues of loss of confidence. There have been a number of suicides related to bullying on these platforms in the US and Britain.

=== Suppression of speech ===
By at least 2018, some doctors have been targets of online harassment from anti-vaccine activists responding to their social media posts, including hundreds of negative false reviews on doctor ratings sites. This made some of the doctors more reluctant to share information about vaccines, but others formed groups to spread factual information about vaccine safety on social media in response.

== Awareness ==
=== Campaigns ===
==== International ====
The Cybersmile Foundation is a cyberbullying charity committed to tackling all forms of online bullying, abuse, and hate campaigns. It was founded in 2010 in response to the increasing number of cyberbullying related incidents of depression, eating disorders, social isolation, self-harm and suicides devastating lives around the world. Cybersmile provides support to victims and their friends and families through social media interaction, email and helpline support. They also run an annual event, Stop Cyberbullying Day, to draw attention to the issue.

==== Spain ====
Multiple non-profit organizations fight cyberbullying and cyberstalking. They advise victims, provide awareness campaigns, and report offenses to the police. These NGOs include the Protégeles, PantallasAmigas, Foundation Alia2, the non-profit initiative Actúa Contra el Ciberacoso, the National Communications Technology Institute (INTECO), the Agency of Internet quality, the Agencia Española de Protección de Datos, the Oficina de Seguridad del Internauta, the Spanish Internet users' Association, the Internauts' Association, and the Spanish Association of Mothers and Parents Internauts. The government of Castile and León has also created a Plan de Prevención del Ciberacoso y Promoción de la Navegación Segura en Centro Escolares, and the government of the Canary Islands has created a portal on the phenomenon called Viveinternet.

==== United States ====
In March 2007, the Advertising Council in the United States, in partnership with the National Crime Prevention Council, U.S. Department of Justice, and Crime Prevention Coalition of America, joined to announce the launch of a new public service advertising campaign designed to educate preteens and teens about how they can play a role in ending cyberbullying.

As of 2008, the Boy Scouts of America's 2008 edition of The Boy Scout Handbook addresses how to deal with online bullying. A new First Class rank requirements adds: "Describe the three things you should avoid doing related to use of the Internet. Describe a cyberbully and how you should respond to one."

In 2008, KTTV Fox 11 News in Los Angeles put out a report about organized cyberbullying on sites like Stickam by people who call themselves "/b/rothas". The site had put out a report on July 26, 2007, about a subject that partly featured cyberbullying, titled "Hackers on Steroids".

On June 2, 2008, parents, teens, teachers, and Internet executives came together at Wired Safety's International Stop Cyberbullying Conference, a two-day gathering in White Plains, New York and New York City. Executives from Facebook, Verizon, MySpace, Microsoft, and many others talked with hundreds about how to better protect themselves and their personal reputations, children and businesses from online harassment. Sponsors of the conference included McAfee, AOL, Disney, Procter & Gamble, Girl Scouts of the USA, WiredTrust, Children's Safety Research and Innovation Centre, and KidZui.com. Cyberharassment versus cyberbullying was a forefront topic, where age makes a difference; abusive internet behavior by adults with the repeated clear intent to harm, ridicule or damage a person or business was classified as stalking harassment, versus bullying by teens and young adults.

An organized movement to make revenge porn illegal began in August 2012: End Revenge Porn. Currently revenge porn is only illegal in two states, but the demand for its criminalization is on the rise as digital technology has increased in the past few generations. The organization seeks to provide support for victims, educate the public, and gain activist support to bring new legislation before the United States Government.

In 2006, PACER.org created a week-long event that was held once a year in October. Today, the campaign is a month-long event and is now known as the National Bullying Prevention Awareness Month.

==== Canada ====
Originating in Canada, Anti-Bullying Day is a day of celebration for those who choose to participate wearing a symbol of colors (pink, blue or purple) as a stance against bullying. A British Columbia teacher founded the Stop A Bully movement, which uses pink wristbands to represent the wearer's stance to stop bullying.

Pink Shirt Day was inspired by David Shepherd and Travis Price. Their high school friends organized a protest in sympathy for a Grade 9 boy who was bullied for wearing a pink shirt. Their stance from wearing pink has been a huge inspiration in the Great Vancouver Mainland. "We know that victims of bullying, witnesses of bullying and bullies themselves all experience the very real and long term negative impacts of bullying regardless of its forms – physical, verbal, written, or on-line (cyberbullying)".

ERASE (Expect Respect and A Safe Education) is an initiative started by the province of British Columbia to foster safe schools and prevent bullying. It builds on already-effective programs set up by the provincial government to ensure consistent policies and practices regarding the prevention of bullying.

=== Community support ===
A number of organizations are in coalition to provide awareness, protection and recourse for this escalating problem. Some aim to inform and provide measures to avoid as well as effectively terminate cyberbullying and cyberharassment. Anti-bullying charity Act Against Bullying launched the CyberKind campaign in August 2009 to promote positive internet usage.

In 2007, YouTube introduced the first Anti-Bullying Channel for youth (BeatBullying), using the assistance of celebrities to tackle the problem.

In March 2010, a 17-year-old girl named Alexis Skye Pilkington was found dead in her room by her parents. Her parents claimed that after repeated cyberbullying, she was driven to suicide. Shortly after her death, attacks resumed. Members of eBaum's World began to troll teens' memorial pages on Facebook, with the comments including expressions of pleasure over the death, with pictures of what seemed to be a banana as their profile pictures. Family and friends of the deceased teen responded by creating Facebook groups denouncing cyberbullying and trolling, with logos of bananas behind a red circle with a diagonal line through it.

In response and partnership to the 2011 film Bully, a grassroots effort to stop cyberbullying called the Bully Project was created. Their goal is to start "a national movement to stop bullying that is transforming children's lives and changing a culture of bullying into one of empathy and action."

=== International cooperation ===
The UNESCO International day against violence and bullying at school including cyberbullying is celebrated every year on the first Thursday of November since 2020.

== See also ==
- Behavioral modernity
- Best Enemies
- Character assassination
- Cringe culture
- Cyber defamation law
- Cyberstalking
- Defamation
- Digital media use and mental health
- Digital safety
- Dogpiling
- Empathy in online communities
- Evolutionary mismatch
- Gamergate
- Gossip
- Griefer
- Instagram's impact on people
- International day against violence and bullying at school including cyberbullying
- Jessi Slaughter cyberbullying case
- Mobbing
- Online Abuse Prevention Initiative
- Sexting
- The Psycho Ex-Wife
- Troll (slang)
- Whataboutism
