= John Cordell =

John Cordell may refer to:

- Sir John Cordell, 2nd Baronet (1646–1690), MP for Sudbury and Suffolk
- Sir John Cordell, 3rd Baronet (1677–1704), MP for Sudbury

== See also ==
- Cordell (surname)
