= Crime Dog =

Crime Dog may refer to:

- Fred McGriff (born 1963), American baseball player
- McGruff the Crime Dog, fictional character in television public-service announcements & other media
- "Crime Dog", episode of television series Wonderfalls
