= Cordel =

Cordel may refer to:

- Cordel, a unit of length, see Obsolete Spanish and Portuguese units of measurement
- Cordel literature, popular and inexpensively Brazilian printed booklets or pamphlets containing folk novels, poems and songs
- Cordel (name), given name and surname
- Cordel Do Fogo Encantado, a popular band from Pernambuco, Brazil
