= Robert Cordell =

Robert Cordell may refer to:

- Robert Cordell (Syphon Filter), a fictional character
- Sir Robert Cordell, 1st Baronet (c. 1616–1680), MP for Sudbury

== See also ==
- Cordell (surname)
