= Brian Loader =

Academic and editor

Brian D. Loader (born 1958) is an academic and editor who was formerly co-director of the Centre for Political Youth Culture and Communication (CPAC) at the University of York. Loader joined the Department of Sociology at York in January 2006, with his scholarly work focusing on digital media communication and democratic governance. His interests are in new media communications technologies; the social, political, and economic factors shaping their development and diffusion; and their implications for social, economic, political, and cultural change. He has published widely in these areas and was a founding editor of the international journal Information, Communication & Society, which explores these issues.

Loader's interest in the transforming capacities of the Internet began in the mid-1990s primarily as a critical response to two discourses that continue to frame discussions about the socio-political influence of new media technologies to this day. The first, addressed in his book The Governance of Cyberspace (1997), highlighted and criticised the "cyber-libertarian" portrayals of the Internet as emancipatory spaces divorced from the "real world" of power, place, history, and political economy. The second, outlined in The Cyberspace Divide (1998), was what impact the Internet would have upon different social groups. These two themes have continued to shape his research interests in how social relations of power are increasingly mediated through information and communication technologies.

== Scholarly work ==
=== Community informatics ===
In 1996 he was responsible for establishing and directing the Community Informatics Research and Applications Unit (CIRA), which attempted to explore the potential of new media for shaping the development, sustainability, and regeneration of community relations. What he describes as community informatics was from the outset concerned with the relationship between geographical places where people lived, worked, and socialized and the networked spaces provided by the Internet. Publications such as Community Informatics: Shaping Computer-Mediated Social Networks (2001) and Challenging the Digital Divide?: A Literature Review of Community Informatics Initiatives (2004) document both the potential of new media for community development and also the wider role it played in the fragmentation and individualization of local social relations. Active research projects, including Trimdon Digital Village, informed UK policy debates about bridging the digital divide. Loader has been a member of the editorial board for the Journal of Community Informatics.

=== Youth engagement ===
On arriving at York, Loader focused upon the potential of social media to influence the political and civic engagement of young citizens. He hosted a small symposium which was later published in an edited collection as Young Citizens In the Digital Age (2007), then established in partnership with Lance Bennett a study group called Networking Young Citizens with the support of the World Universities Network. Together with Ariadne Vromen and Mike Xenos, he undertook a three-country comparative study of the potential influence of social media upon the participatory culture of young citizens entitled The Civic Network, which was funded by the Spencer Foundation.

=== New media impact ===
His research interest in the broader impact of new media upon democratic governance began with the publication of Digital Democracy: Discourse and Decision-Making in the Information Age (1999), following the first of several conferences devoted to this issue. He first explored the use of new media by social movements in Cyberprotest: New Media, Citizens and Social Movements (2004). He further developed these themes in Social Media and Democracy: Social Media Innovations in Participatory Politics (2012).

The potential for new media to shape practices of social care both organisationally and individually has been a longstanding research area. He has been particularly interested in the use of information and communications technology in re-structuring health and social care organizations and professional practices. With colleagues on an Economic and Social Research Council-funded project on online community care (the use of the Internet as a potential means of online social support), they revealed the effectiveness of social networking amongst informed participants for facilitating social support. It further foregrounded how such technologies could transform relations between professionals and clients. His co-edited Digital Welfare for the Third Age (2009) develops these ideas on the basis of a Department of Health and Social Care-funded project into electronic service delivery for older people.

Loader was editor of the international journal Information, Communication & Society (ICS). Included in the Thomson Reuters Social Science Citation Index, ICS is published in twelve issues annually. Under Loader’s editorship, ICS also hosted regular conferences around the world on a range of topics related to the social, cultural, political, and economic influence of new media communications technologies.

== Selected publications ==
=== Books ===
- The Governance Of Cyberspace: Politics, Technology and Global Restructuring (ed.), Routledge (1997)
- Cyberspace Divide: Equality, Agency, and Policy in the Information Society (ed.), Routledge (1998)
- Digital Democracy: Discourse and Decision Making in the Information Age (ed. with Barry N. Hague), Routledge (1999)
- Community Informatics: Shaping Computer-mediated Social Relations, (ed. with Leigh Keeble), Routledge (2001)
- Challenging the Digital Divide?: A Literature Review of Community Informatics Initiatives (with Leigh Keeble), Joseph Rowntree Foundation (2004)
- Cyberprotest: New Media, Citizens and Social Movements (ed. with Wim van de Donk, Paul G. Nixon, and Dieter Rucht), Routledge (2004)
- Young Citizens in the Digital Age: Political Engagement, Young People and New Media (ed.), London: Routledge (2007)
- Digital Welfare for the Third Age: Health and Social Care Informatics for Older People (ed. with Mike Hardey and Leigh Keeble), London: Routledge (2009)
- Social Media and Democracy: Social Media Innovations in Participatory Politics (ed. with Dan Mercea), London: Routledge (2012)
- The Networked Young Citizen: Social Media, Political Participation and Civic Engagement (ed. with Ariadne Vromen and Mike Xenos), New York: Routledge (2014)

=== Articles ===
- "Campus politics, student societies and social media" (with Adriane Vromen, Michael A. Xenos, Holly Steel, and Samuel Bergen) (2015), The Sociological Review 63:4, doi:10.1111/1467-954X.00251
- "Performing for the young networked citizen?: celebrity politics, social networking and the political engagement of young people" (with Adriane Vromen and Michael A. Xenos) (2016), Media, Culture & Society 28:3, doi:10.1177/0163443715608261
- "Beyond lifestyle politics in a time of crisis?: comparing young people’s issue agendas and views on inequality" (with Adriane Vromen and Michael A. Xenos) (2016), Policy Studies Journal 36:6, doi:10.1080/01442872.2015.1095283
- "Everyday-making through Facebook engagement: young citizens' political interactions in Australia, UK and USA" (with Adriane Vromen, Michael A. Xenos, and Francesco Bailo) (2016), Political Studies Journal 64:3, doi:10.1177/0032321715614012
- "Understanding digital cultures" (with Jack Qiu) (2016), Information, Communication & Society 19:1, doi:10.1080/1369118X.2015.1094114
- "Protest communication ecologies" (with Dan Mercea and Laura Ianelli) (2016), Information, Communication & Society 19:3, doi:10.1080/1369118X.2015.1109701
- "Politicians, celebrities and social media: a case of informalization?" (with Nathan Manning, Ruth Penfold-Mounce, Adriane Vromen, and Michael A. Xenos) (2016), Journal of Youth Studies 20:2, doi:10.1080/13676261.2016.1206867
