= Empathy in online communities =

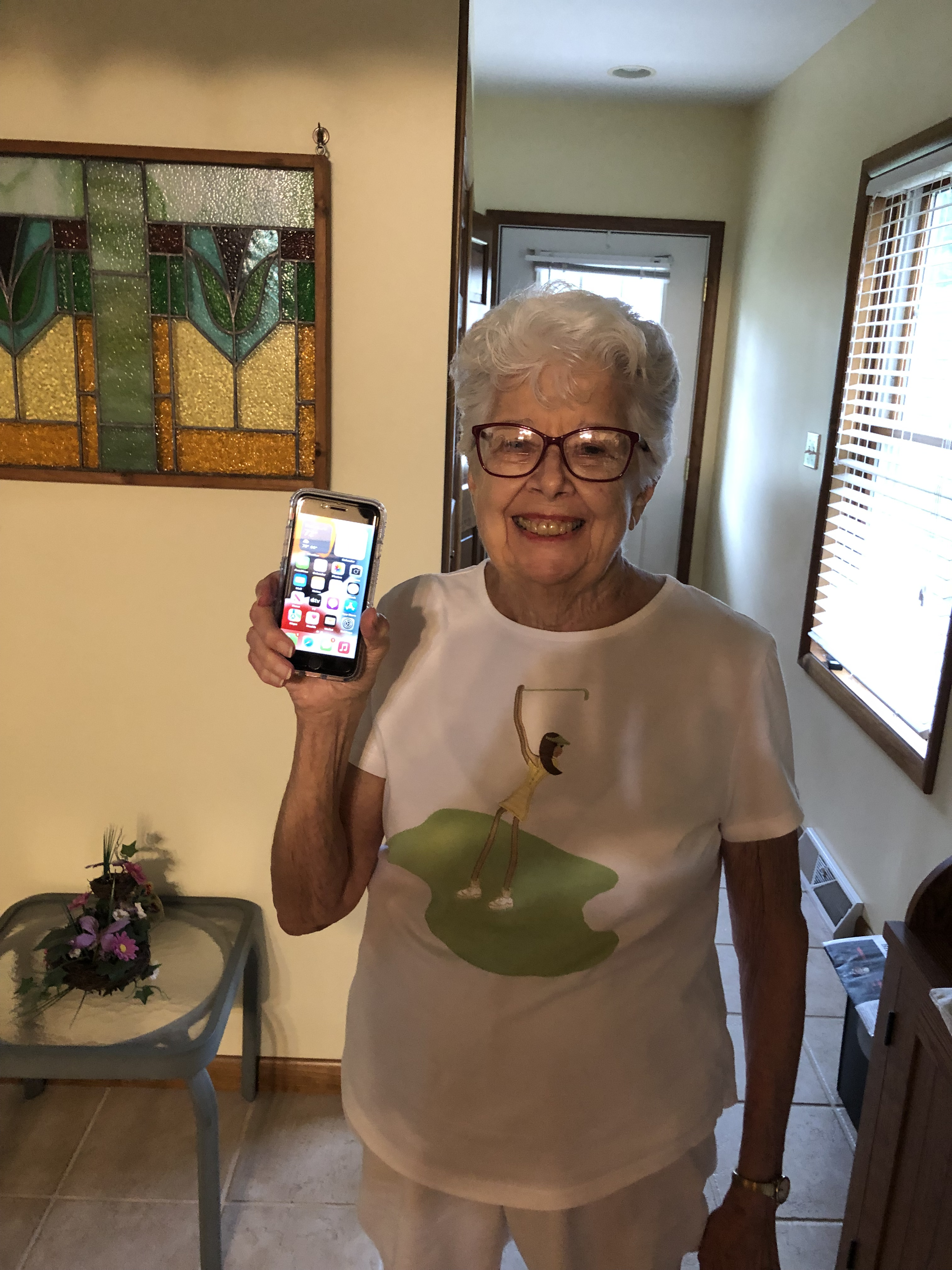
Helping an elderly person learn how to use a smartphone is an example of online empathy.

Empathy has been studied in the context of online communities as it pertains to enablers of interpersonal communication, anonymity, as well as barriers to online relationships, such as ambiguity, cyberbullying and internet trolling. The importance of this topic can not be underestimated as the landscape of online use drastically changed or evolved following the Covid-19 Pandemic of 2020 which forced many in the workplace, schools and even novice tech users into new and uncomfortable situations. This forced much more time spent and reliance on the virtual world, through our computers, phones, and tablets. Schools and workplaces moved online consumers also moved online for basic needs like grocery shopping, medical appointments and a host of new virtual services that impacted all generations.

In online communications context becomes very important in understanding of people and is foundational for empathy. The important role of context includes intrapersonal relationships or personal disposition the interpersonal that includes our interactions with family, peers, workplaces, and schools; and the environmental that includes how we move through our community.

For example, researchers Sameer Hinduja and Justin Patchin studied a national sample of 1,644 12- to 15-year-olds in the United States, and discovered that youth with higher levels of empathy were significantly less likely to cyberbully others. Cognitive empathy (understanding the feelings, or taking the perspective, of others) was linked to lower cyberbullying, while affective empathy (feeling or experiencing the emotions of someone else) was not.

Notably, it also has been found that on online health support communities members tend to exhibit higher levels of empathic concern.

== Comparison/contrast with empathy in offline environments ==
A number of studies have explored the importance of empathy in offline settings. For example, one study found that mindfulness and acceptance-based behavioral approaches may have potential for increasing empathy in interpersonal relationships. Other work has explored the link between fiction and empathy, suggesting that the experience-taking quality of fiction may increase empathy among readers. There is also evidence that individuals tend to more readily feel empathy for those that they view as similar to themselves.

In online contexts, several researchers have pointed out that there are some key differences in how users interact online that may affect levels of empathy. For example, communication in online forum communities interact asynchronously, and are generally text-based rather than verbal communications. Establishment of trust in online communities may also operate differently in online environments. Furthermore, communications related interactions with others online might facilitate empathy while video or online gaming might negatively affect empathy.

== Enablers ==
- Anonymity — The anonymous nature of many online communities can allow individuals to feel more comfortable disclosing more personal information, which in turn can increase feelings of trust, connectedness and empathy.
- Shared interests — Because empathy tends to be strongest among those that share common experiences, the presence of niche online communities can set the stage for higher levels of empathy among members.

== Barriers ==
- Ambiguity, because asynchronous, text-mediated online conversations lack the richness of interaction and cues that face-to-face interaction provides, online communication tends to be much more ambiguous. This ambiguity may decrease members' abilities to find similarities in one another. In both online and offline interactions, increased perceived similarity is associated with increased empathy.
- Cyberbullying is any bullying that takes place using electronic media. Studies have suggested that individuals who are bystanders, that is, witnessing someone bullying someone else, are less likely to intervene in online contexts.
- Internet trolling is "the practice of behaving in a deceptive, destructive, or disruptive manner in a social setting on the Internet with no apparent instrumental purpose." Although empirical research on trolling is limited, studies have suggested that internet trolling may be a space occupied by already-sadistic individuals who can easily disrupt conversations and communities.
