= People v. Marquan M. =

2014 US cybercrime court case

- Court: New York Court of Appeals
- Full case name: The People of the State of New York, Respondent, v. Marquan M., Appellant. County of Albany, Intervenor-Respondent.
- Decided: July 1, 2014 (Court decision)
- Citation: 2014 WL 2931482
- Transcript: Trial of June 5, 2014

Case opinions
- Albany County Law criminalizing cyberbullying was drafted so broadly that it violated the Free Speech Clause of the First Amendment.
- Decision by: Judge Graffeo
- Concurrence: Lippman, Read, Rivera, and Abdus-Salaam.
- Dissent: Smith, joined by Pigott

People v. Marquan M., 2014 WL 2931482 (Ct. App. NY July 1, 2014) was the first case in which a US court weighed the constitutionality of criminalizing cyberbullying. In People v. Marquan M., the New York Court of Appeals struck down an Albany County law that criminalized cyberbullying, declaring its restrictions overly broad and thus in violation of the Free Speech Clause of the First Amendment.

== Background ==
=== Historical context ===
As access to the internet and other information technology has become widespread, there has been a rise in the use of these technologies to bully others, particularly among children and teenagers. This online bullying has been termed cyberbullying, defined as "using the Internet, cell phones or other devices to send or post text or images intended to hurt or embarrass another person" by the National Crime Prevention Council. Following several cyberbullying cases where the victim committed suicide, states have pursued both educational and legislative approaches to combating the phenomenon. By 2011, over forty-five US states had implemented laws against digital harassment, although many of these were focused on school policies for dealing with bullying and harassment, rather than criminalizing cyberbullying. However, in 2010, the Albany County legislature introduced a law that criminalized cyberbullying to fight the growing problem.

=== Facts of the case ===
In 2010, the Albany County Legislature introduced the offense of cyberbullying to address "non-physical bullying behaviors transmitted by electronic means[.]" The law defined cyberbullying as

any act of communicating or causing a communication to be sent by mechanical or electronic means, including posting statements on the internet or through a computer or email network, disseminating embarrassing or sexually explicit photographs; disseminating private, personal, false or sexual information, or sending hate mail, with no legitimate private, personal, or public purpose, with the intent to harass, annoy, threaten, abuse, taunt, intimidate, torment, humiliate, or otherwise inflict significant emotional harm on another person[.]

The law made cyberbullying a misdemeanor offense punishable by up to one year in jail with a $1000 fine.

One month after the law went into effect, the defendant Marquan M., a 16-year-old high school student, created a Facebook page under a pseudonym where he posted photos of classmates accompanied by descriptions of their alleged sexual practices, partners, and other personal information. After a police investigation determined that the defendant was the one responsible for the content, he was charged with cyberbullying under the Albany County law.

=== Procedural history ===
At trial, Marquan M. filed a motion to dismiss, arguing that the law violated the Free Speech Clause of the First Amendment because it was overbroad and unlawfully vague. Specifically, the defendant contended that the law was overbroad because it proscribed protected expression and unlawfully vague because it failed to give fair notice to the public. Following the City Court's denial of his motion to dismiss, the defendant pleaded guilty, but raised constitutional arguments on appeal. The County Court affirmed the City Court's denial of the motion to dismiss and held that the law did not violate the defendant's First Amendment rights. The county found that while parts of law are invalid, they are nonetheless severable, rendering the remainder of the law constitutional if interpreted in a restrictive manner. The New York Court of Appeals granted the defendant leave to appeal.

== Court of Appeals ==
In a 5–2 decision, the court concluded that the law, as drafted, was "overbroad and facially invalid under the Free Speech Clause of the First Amendment." Basing its decision on the breadth and vagueness doctrines, the court concluded that the law is of "alarming breadth" as it criminalized a broad spectrum of protected communications "far beyond the cyberbullying of children." While recognizing that a court should strive to save a statute, the court found it could not employ the severance doctrine in a way that would "cure all of the law's constitutional ills." They concluded that it would require an excessive judicial revision, which could result in an unlawful rewriting of a legislative enactment. Under the First Amendment, free speech is generally protected and may not be restricted by the government except in limited categories and specific types of communication. A law is considered to be overbroad if it "prohibits a real and substantial amount of expression." Because the law criminalizes "any act of communicating ... by mechanical or electronic means ... with no legitimate ... personal ... purpose, with the intent to harass [or] annoy... another person," the court decided the law was overbroad because it includes communications with a much broader scope than bullying minors, such as those communications containing information meant to annoy or embarrass. However, the court stated that "the First Amendment permits the prohibition of cyberbullying directed at children, depending on how that activity is defined," and suggested that a more narrowly drafted law against cyberbullying may be constitutional.

=== Dissent ===
The dissent argued that the provisions found by the court to be unconstitutional could be "severed from the rest of the legislation and that what remains...be interpreted in a way that renders it constitutionally valid." Specifically, Judge Smith argued that the majority opinion was overly concerned with two aspects of the definition of cyberbullying provided by the law. The law forbids communications that have no legitimate purpose and whose intent is "to harass, annoy, threaten, abuse, taunt, intimidate, torment, humiliate, or otherwise inflict significant emotional harm." While the majority opinion argued that the definition was overbroad by criminalizing communications with the intent to annoy, the dissent argued that this language should be interpreted as a "non-exhaustive list of ways" that significant emotional harm could be inflicted, and that it only forbids communications whose intent is to annoy in order to inflict significant emotional harm. The dissent concluded that despite "flaws in the draftmanship of the... law," Albany County had a constitutional right to prohibit communications that have no legitimate purpose, are of private concern, and are intended to inflict significant emotional harm on children.

== See also ==
- United States v. Drew, a notable US Supreme Court case that prompted cyberbullying legislation.
