= Cordell =

Cordell may refer to:

- Cordell (name), including a list of people and fictional characters with the given name and surname
  - Cordell baronets, a title in the Baronetage of England
- Cordell, Kentucky, a community in the U.S.
- New Cordell, Oklahoma, commonly called Cordell, a community in the U.S.
- "Cordell", a song by The Cranberries from the 1996 album To the Faithful Departed
- Cordell Formation, a geologic formation in Michigan, U.S.
- Cordell, Michigan, an unincorporated community

== See also ==
- Cordell & Cordell, an American law firm
- Cordell Bank National Marine Sanctuary, off the coast of California, U.S.
- Cordell–Lorenz Observatory, in Sewanee, Tennessee, U.S.
- Cordelle, a place in France
