= Ethiopian feminists facing digital gender-based violence =

Against a background of traditional views of women, rising internet use, a young population and an unsafe offline life, women and girls in Ethiopia are facing increasing amounts of digital violence. Some women, feeling endangered, have left the country as a result. Researchers, activists and lawyers have called for online content to be taken down and specific digital legislation to be drafted and enforced.

== Online violence and its offline effects ==
Sexual violence against women and girls in Ethiopia is common. In 2023, in the Women, Peace and Security Index by Georgetown University, Ethiopia came 146 out of 177 countries. Over several years online harassment of and violence against women and girls in Ethiopia has increased. It can range from sexist remarks about appearance and women’s role in society, to revenge porn, threats of beating, acid attacks, abduction, rape or death. The real-life effect on women and girls of these attacks can include mental health problems, damaged reputations and a withdrawal from public and economic life. When the online attacks migrate to the real world, for example when online attackers find out where the targeted women and girls live, this can result in physical attacks, street harassment, threats to children and can cause victims to move house or job or even flee the country in fear of femicide. In a country that criminalises homosexuality, it can also lead to physical attacks on LGBTQI+ people in particular and indeed on anybody labelled as homosexual.

== Research studies ==
The Centre for Information Resilience (CIR) conducted interviews with Ethiopian women holding public roles or being active online. The centre published a report on this in 2024 entitled ‘Silenced, Shamed and Threatened’. They found that technology-facilitated gender-based violence (TFGBV) had become “normalised to the point of invisibility.” In 2024, CER also published an analysis of gendered hate speech on social media in Ethiopia called ‘Normalised and invisible.’ It is thought that traditional views of women, the young population, the rise in internet use and the war in Tigray, when sexual violence was used as a weapon of war by Ethiopian and Eritrean soldiers, have all helped to create an online environment in which even femicide is considered unremarkable. AFP Fact Check collaborated with Deutsche Welle Akademie, to investigate the cyber harassment of women in Ethiopia, analysing misogynistic posts published on TikTok and Facebook. They discovered disparaging remarks about women’s physical appearance, threats of acid attacks and other physical violence, and the public sharing of women’s phone numbers.

== Individuals affected ==
Women in particular jeopardy of digital gender-based violence are feminists, activists, politicians and those with a public profile. Some women are known to have fled Ethiopia fearing for their lives after online and offline threats. Yordanos Bezabih, an Ethiopian women’s rights activist, started a campaign with the hashtag #JusticeforHeaven to fight against gender-based cyberspace violence. As a result, she herself become a target. She experienced years of online threats of acid attacks, gang-rape and death. In 2025, subscribers to an online community organised a search for her address. Deepfake nude images of her were shared, she was filmed in real life, her house and online accounts were broken into, her private photos and messages posted on social media. When the attackers finally circulated her address, suggesting that she be executed, she left Ethiopia on a human rights defender scholarship.

In 2023, Lella Misikir helped to start a campaign, called ‘My Whistle, My Voice’, that suggested women carry whistles and use them if they were harassed in the street. A TikTok video of the campaign became popular. Shortly after, videos of Misikir were circulated suggesting that she was gay. Her online attackers next searched for her address. In November 2024, Misikir left the country.

== Legal issues ==
Ethiopia has some laws on online harassment and defamation, for example the Computer Crimes Proclamation. However, technology-facilitated, gender-based violence (TFGBV), such as deepfakes, non-consensual image sharing, and coordinated harassment, is not explicitly recognized as crime. In practice too, women are often not believed when reporting such violence and are not taken seriously. Police advice is often that women affected should simply leave the online space. Social media platforms can remove content when it is brought to their attention but the offenders are not banned. Users can only block them.
