= The Psycho Ex-Wife =

ThePsychoExWife.com
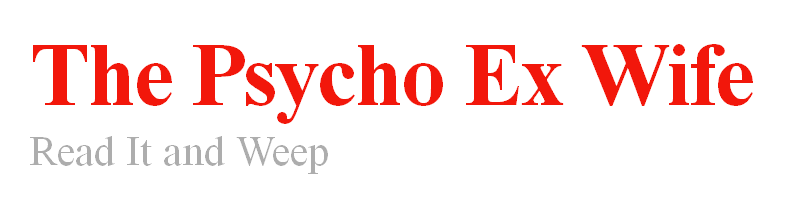

- ThePsychoExWife.com homepage on May 31, 2011
- Website type: Blog
- Available in: English
- Owner: Misty Weaver-Ostinato
- Creators: Anthony Morelli and Misty Weaver-Ostinato
- Website: www.thepsychoexwife.com
- Commercial: Yes
- Registration: Required to post (free)
- Launched: 2007
- Current status: inactive

The Psycho Ex-Wife, also known by the domain name ThePsychoExWife.com, was a blog and community website that operated in the United States between 2007 and 2011. The website was created by Anthony Morelli and Misty Weaver-Ostinato in 2007. Morelli, then writing as an anonymous blogger, originally used the site as an online journal to describe the troubled relationship with his former wife as well as his negative experiences with the family court system, and criticism of the "divorce industry". The blog eventually evolved into a popular advice column and support network for people in abusive relationships, particularly partners with mental health issues, and long-term divorce and custody cases.

In June 2011, ThePsychoExWife.com was shut down following an order by a family court judge who said that the website subjected the blogger's ex-wife to "outright cruelty" and could be harmful to the couple's children. The case received widespread news media attention and the blogger appealed the family court decision as a violation of his rights under the First Amendment to the U.S. Constitution.

== History ==
ThePsychoExWife.com was created in December 2007 by Anthony Morelli and Misty Weaver-Ostinato. They were both divorced parents who were in a relationship at the time. The website was initially run as an online blog by Morelli. He wrote anonymously as "LM" and used pseudonyms (e.g. PEW for "Psycho Ex-Wife") when referring to other individuals. According to Morelli, he found it a healthy place to "vent" his feelings about his failed marriage, divorce, and subsequent custody battle over their two children. The couple had been divorced since 2004, with shared custody of their sons. Morelli estimated that he had spent $80,000 on legal expenses subsequent to the divorce, contesting what he described as his ex-wife's accusations of child abuse and violations of the divorce agreement.

The first post was made by Misty Weaver-Ostinato ("DW") on December 21, 2007. Her introduction to Morelli's custody battle, began: "Over the past 4 years I have been involved with a man who has a psycho ex wife." She stated that the ex-wife had divorced the man, but "she can't let go" and that "she has wrecked (sic) havoc on our lives and the lives of our children," and that they had gone through "3 custody evaluations, 6 false contempt petitions, 3 custody schedules, 1 psych evaluation, 1 false child abuse allegation, 2 false calls to the local sheriff's office, 4 years of parental alienation, $80,000, 1 break in, 1 case of stalking, 1 restraining order" and "FINALLY" had obtained "50/50 custody of their children". Her post said "We have fought a legal system that keeps children with their mother no matter what she does" and promised that the website would "lay it all out for you".

That same day, Morelli made an introductory post explaining his motives for starting the blog and the unflattering tone in some of their posts. He said that the topics he would be discussing included children's and father's rights, mental health issues, traditional family values, and the role of mass media, radical feminism, and other factors influencing U.S divorce laws and legislation (family law, no-fault divorce, et al.). The two hoped that by sharing their personal experiences, as well as providing information and resources on the internet, they might help other people in similar situations.

A post a few days later clarified that, despite the website's provocative name, ThePsychoExWife.com was intended for both divorced men and women in abusive marriages and long-term relationships. Furthermore, Weaver-Ostinato explained, the blog voiced what the couple felt were genuine concerns regarding the U.S. family court system:

We are NOT anti-mother or simply pro-father, we believe all children deserve BOTH parents, unless there are serious issues which prevent one parent from providing a stable, loving environment. An environment where the children are encouraged to love and be loved by both parents. We offer a view few judges will ever see. For attorneys, custody evaluators, guardians ad-litem, and judges, a custody case ends with their decision. They make a ruling and walk away with nary a care as to how clients can, and do, go against the orders they have handed down.

Morelli and Weaver-Ostinato went on to write hundreds of blog posts over the next few years. In addition to his struggles with divorce, Morelli described his observations as a single father in family court and spoke out against the so-called "divorce industry". He also used the blog to publicly document alleged harassment from his ex-wife and former in-laws with redacted e-mail, instant messages, and voice mail. This documentation was also used to present evidence in family court hearings. Morelli partially attributed his ex-wife's behavior to borderline personality disorder and often wrote about the link between abusive relationships and mental illness. In May 2008, ThePsychoExWife.com was featured on Divorce360.com with Morelli being interviewed under his "Mister M" pen name.

ThePsychoExWife.com attracted a large audience, especially among single parents, who shared their own divorce and custody experiences in the couple's advice column. Morelli and Weaver-Ostinato eventually expanded the website to include a members-only message board to publicly discuss divorce, child custody, borderline personality disorder, and parental alienation syndrome. Morelli started writing reviews for divorce-related books and websites for its "suggested reading" list. They also began selling advertising space on the website for services to help divorced parents with custody and visitation rights. Within four years of its launch, ThePsychoExWife.com was attracting over 200,000 followers a month. In September 2009, Morelli and Weaver-Ostinato started a consultation service together, Mr. Custody Coach, for clients going through high-conflict divorce and custody cases.

== Controversy ==
Morelli's former wife, Allison Morelli, eventually became aware of the website. She complained about it to the Bucks County, Pennsylvania, family court. At a June 6, 2011, hearing, Judge Diane Gibbons ordered Anthony Morelli to take the website down. In that hearing and in a second hearing a week later, she said that the website statements about Allison Morelli were "inaccurate and denigrating" and belittled her, going beyond "venting" to "outright cruelty". She told Anthony Morelli that she might give Allison full custody of their children if he refused to close the website. Although the parents disagreed on whether their sons had actually read the blog, the court determined their children were aware of the website. Judge Gibbons also banned him from mentioning his ex-wife or his children on any public media.

At the second hearing, Anthony Morelli formally protested the judge's order, arguing that it was an infringement on his and Weaver-Ostinato's freedom of speech. Gibbons told Morelli: "This is about children. You may say anything that you would like to say. You may publish it. You may put it on a billboard. But you will not have your children, because that is abusive." She additionally threatened Morelli with contempt of court.

Although ultimately forced to comply with the family court ruling, Morelli believed that his first and fourteenth amendment rights had been violated and hired attorney Kevin Handy to challenge the decision in Pennsylvania Superior Court. Handy called Judge Gibbons' order "a classic example of an overly broad and unenforceable prior restraint on free speech". He cited Brown v. Entertainment Merchants Association, in which the U.S. Supreme Court struck down a California state ban on the sale of violent video games to minors, as an example of an unlawful restriction on constitutionally protected speech for the purposes of child welfare. Morelli and Weaver-Ostinato also started another website, SaveThePsychoExWife.com, both as a way to inform the public of the ruling, the progress of their appeal, and to raise funds for their legal defense. As of August 10, 2011, the website had raised $6,095 in donations from its readers with a goal of $15,000.

== Media response ==
The story was picked up by the media within weeks of the ruling. Response was largely negative with mainstream media outlets emphasizing the derogatory nature of his posts. Criticism was primarily focused on the insulting language used on the website's introduction, in which Morelli referred to his ex-wife as "Jabba The Hut with less personality", rather than other topics discussed by Morelli. His hometown newspaper The Intelligencer published a particularly harsh editorial and stated that Morelli "may have a right to embarrass and belittle his children’s mother in a very public way, but that doesn’t mean he should do it". Janet Shan of the Hinterland Gazette was one of the few voices supportive of Morelli pointing out that the author had never threatened his ex-wife and wrote "if the gist of the posts over the four years was to express frustration with the divorce process through the courts, the emotional toll it has taken on him and his children, and the angst he feels going through the process, then he has every right under the Constitution to voice that frustration".

Morelli's case had support from a number of prominent First Amendment legal experts. Robert D. Richards, founding director of Pennsylvania State University's Pennsylvania Center for the First Amendment, felt Gibbons' "did overstep her bounds a little bit" adding that even if the blog was defamatory the correct action was to sue for libel not block the speech. UCLA law professor and fellow blogger Eugene Volokh of The Volokh Conspiracy strongly objected the ruling both on his website, and during an on-air interview with WHYY-FM, calling the family court judge's order "a blatantly unconstitutional exercise of her authority. She’s flaunting (sic) the U.S. Constitution." CBS Los Angeles legal analyst Royal Oakes also discussed the case commenting that "it makes the McCourt divorce look genteel by comparison". Doug Mataconis of OutsideTheBeltway.com brought up the issue of a possible conflict of interest, as many of Morelli's posts dealt with his negative opinion of the family court system, and questioned if it was appropriate to take the entire blog offline rather than removing posts specifically about his ex-wife.

Both Anthony and Allison Morelli appeared on The Today Show with Amy Robach and Matt Lauer in early August; afterwards the case was discussed by Star Jones and psychiatrist Dr. Gail Saltz. Lauer said during the show that Morelli "clearly does not have the best interests of his children in mind." That same week the case was discussed on Fox News' "Kelly's Court" with host Megyn Kelly and guest panelists ex-prosecutor Jonna Spilbor and legal analyst Mercedes Colwin. The case was also covered by major U.S. and international newspapers including the New York Daily News, San Francisco Chronicle and Time. Gibbons declined to comment on the case.

The response from the blogosphere was mixed. Female columnists from CafeMom, The Huffington Post, Jezebel, and iVillage.com were all heavily critical of the blog. One exception was Yahoo! Shine senior editor Lylah Alphonse who commented "the posts that Morelli and Weaver-Ostinato wrote at The Psycho Ex-Wife may have been libelous, but libel is a civil court issue, not a criminal one". William Belle of Salon.com compared Morelli's behavior to that of Tricia Walsh who posted insulting videos of her husband on YouTube in order gain an advantage in their divorce settlement and her attempts to have the pre-nuptial agreement thrown out.

Morelli found some of his strongest support in the fathers' rights movement. Fathers & Families was one of the first websites to report the blog's shut down. Dr. Tara J. Palmatier of Shrink4Men.com defended the website and was concerned over the abusive behavior documented by Morelli during his four years of blogging.

Taking issue with his Today Show appearance, Morelli contested the media's perception that the sole purpose of his blog was for "bashing my ex-wife". The blogger also defended his writing style as a means of attracting readers to the website, especially those experiencing similar issues, but also as a way to keep his sense of humor.

Our website and community is not about bashing our ex-spouses. I am not fighting for the freedom to ‘defend my right to bash my ex-wife in public.’ I’m fighting to prevent our support group — and every other one out there — from being silenced simply because a judge doesn’t like what is being written/spoken about, or the manner in which it is being written/spoken.

Blogger Nathan Hacker of the family law firm Cordell & Cordell cited the case as a warning to avoid "going public" by releasing information about divorce and child custody cases.
