= Alia2 Foundation =

Spanish nonprofit organization

The Alia2 Foundation is a Spanish nonprofit organization whose goal is to stop internet child grooming to prevent child abduction and rape. Alia2 works together with other public entities to combat this threat by educating parents and children how to use new technologies responsibly.

== See also ==
- Child grooming
- Cyberbullying
- Cyberstalking
- Pedophilia
