= Olimpia Coral Melo =

Mexican activist

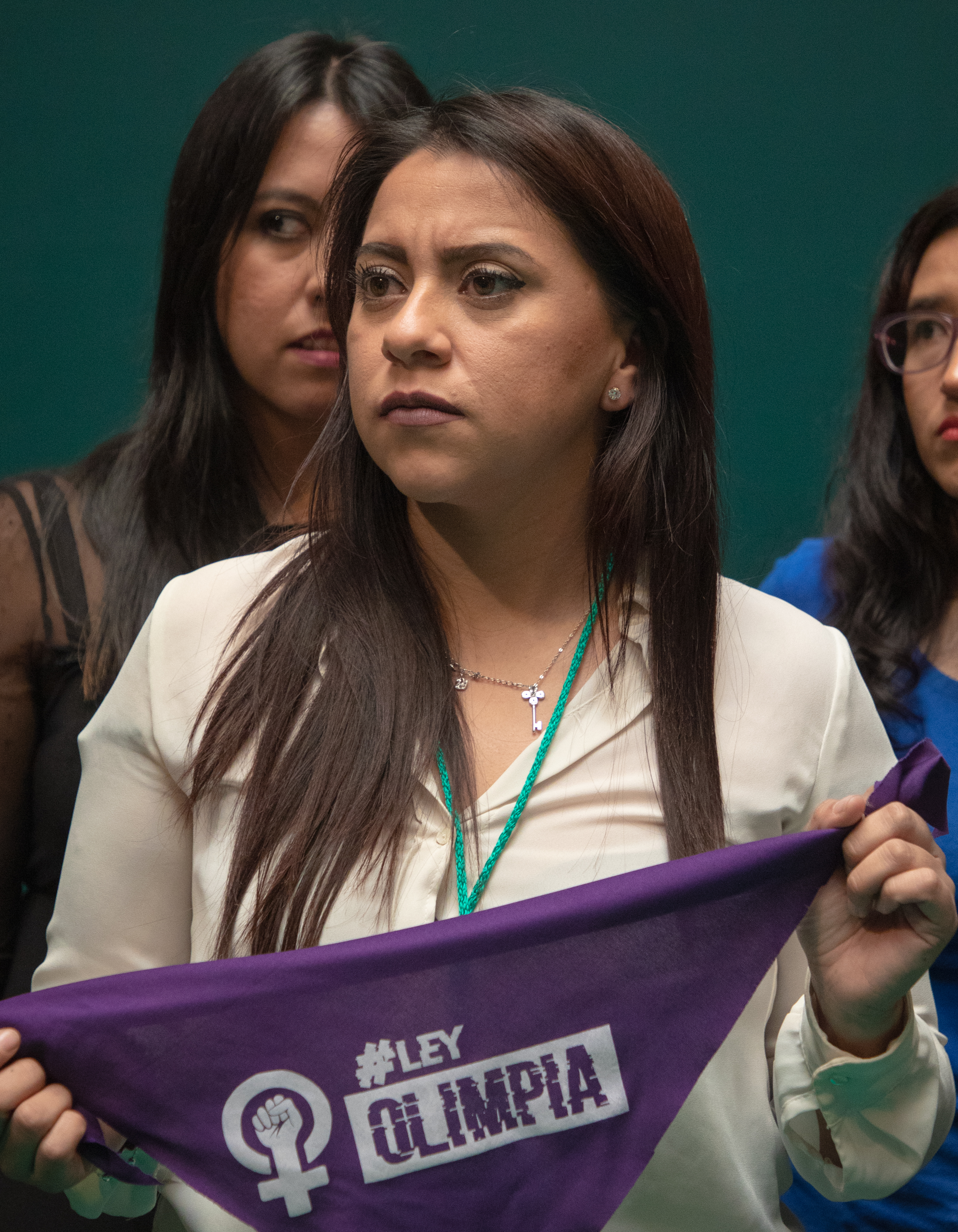
Olimpia Coral Melo

Olimpia Coral Melo (born in Huauchinango, Puebla 6 July 1990) is a Mexican activist recognized as one of the 100 most influential people in the world in 2021 by Time magazine and one of the 100 most powerful women in Mexico by Forbes Magazine. She promoted the creation of a law against digital gender violence in Mexico, Argentina, and Colombia that takes her name, the Olimpia Law. After suffering digital violence by an ex-partner who released a sex video of her without her consent, she began a seven-year struggle to create and promote a law that would criminalize these practices.

== Activist ==
In her youth, her partner disclosed a private video with sexual content that quickly went viral in Mexico. This episode had emotional effects on Olimpia, who fell into depression and attempted suicide, as she has mentioned in interviews. As a result, she founded the organization Mujeres contra la violencia de género in Puebla and later moved to Mexico City to found, together with other women, the Frente Nacional para la Sororidad, to prevent virtual violence and accompany women who had experienced it.

In March 2014, when she was 19 years old, she filed a bill in the Puebla Congress. After her advocacy, she succeeded in having digital violence recognized. In 2018, she managed to get punished those who share intimate materials without consent, with up to six years in prison. Since then 28 states of the Mexican Republic recognize this crime. On January 22, 2020, Mexico City joined these entities by publishing it in its Official Gazette.

In 2019, when the law had only been passed in 11 states in Mexico, she told her story to BBC Mundo:

People have no idea what creates that kind of violence. They limit your freedom, your privacy, your mobility, your life. And you accept it because you believe you are guilty. That's why access to justice is almost impossible. Every "like" to those publications is an aggression, every "like" is a blow. Every time someone shares intimate content of a person who did not allow it is like a rape.

== National Sorority Front ==
Olimpia Coral Melo founded the Frente Nacional para la Sororidad, a collective whose first objective was to provide support to women living with digital violence. Later, it began to group independent feminists and collectives to have a presence in various Mexican states. Currently, the Front has a specific group of defenders of victims of violence on the Internet, which also provides legal and psychological assistance and support.

== Ley Olimp.IA Victim Support Line ==
Olimpia Coral Melo partnered with AuraChat.Ai, an AI development company based in California, to launch "Línea de Apoyo 24/7 #LeyOlimp.IA," an AI-powered victim support line designed to assist victims of digital violence. This platform utilizes a multitude of AI models to provide guidance and facilitate access to emotional, psychological, and legal support resources. The AI models are trained to replicate the expertise and methodologies used by Melo's team of counselors, social workers, attorneys, and defensoras digitales. The platform operates 24/7 to offer personalized responses to victims, using AI-generated voice notes and messages.
