= Information, Communication & Society =

- Discipline: Information science, media studies
- Language: English
- Edited by: Brian Loader

Publication details
- History: 1998-present
- Publisher: Routledge
- Frequency: 16/year
- Impact factor: 4.124 (2018)

Standard abbreviations
- ISO 4: Inf. Commun. Soc.

Indexing
- ISSN: 1468-4462 (print); 1369-118X (web)
- LCCN: sn98023196
- OCLC no.: 645845761

Links
- Journal homepage; Online access; Online archive

Information, Communication & Society is a peer-reviewed academic journal covering the role of digital media in the Information Age. It was established in 1998 and is published by Routledge. The editor-in-chief is Dan Mercea (University of York). According to the Journal Citation Reports, the journal has a 2018 impact factor of 4.124, ranking it 4th out of 88 journals in the category "Communication" and 5th out of 148 journals in the category "Sociology".
