= McGruff the Crime Dog =

Character in US crime awareness campaigns

- First appearance: July 1980
- Created by: Dancer Fitzgerald Sample through the Ad Council

In-universe information
- Species: Bloodhound
- Gender: Male
- Family: Scruff (nephew)

McGruff the Crime Dog is an anthropomorphic animated bloodhound created by Dancer Fitzgerald Sample advertising executive Jack Keil (who also voiced the character) through the Ad Council and later the National Crime Prevention Council to increase crime awareness and personal safety in the United States. McGruff costumes are used by police outreach efforts, often with children. McGruff was created in 1979 and debuted in 1980 with a series of public service announcements educating citizens on personal security measures, such as locking doors and putting lights on timers, in order to reduce crime. His name was selected as part of a nationwide contest in July 1980.

McGruff proved to be a successful campaign with over $100 million in free air time donated in the first year reaching over 50% of adults. McGruff campaigns continued over the years to cover topics such as child abduction, robbery, anti-drug messages, and anti-bullying campaigns. From 1982 to 2012, a number of municipalities participated in the McGruff house program which offered temporary haven to children fearing immediate harm. McGruff has continued to be well-recognized, with nine out of ten people recognizing him by name in a 2007 survey. This is in part thanks to recent campaigns against cyberbullying, online fakes, and crime against the elderly.

== History ==
=== Crime as a public concern ===
The decades prior to McGruff's creation saw an increase in U.S. public concern over crime. In the 1960s, a number of riots broke out across the U.S. and numerous public figures were assassinated, including President Kennedy, Martin Luther King Jr., and Malcolm X. Accepting the Republican nomination for president, Barry Goldwater positioned crime as one of the biggest issues facing the nation. While Goldwater lost to Lyndon B. Johnson, the issue of crime did not stop there. In July 1965, President Johnson formed the President's Commission on Law Enforcement and Administration of Justice to "probe ... fully and deeply into the problems of crime in our nation." (Note: credits the creation of the commission to a May 1965 Gallup poll. Wilson (1975) was the first to claim that Gallup reported "Crime" as the most important issue in May 1965. disputes this statistic, but recognizes the impact the work had on policy in the 1980s. The second revised edition of Wilson's book (1983) does not contain the claim. The results of the May 1965 Gallup poll shows "Crime" at 0.96% and "Juvenile delinquency" at 1.69%, the highest response was "Vietnam War" at 22.76%.)

After two years and $2.5 million, the Commission delivered its report, The Challenge of Crime in a Free Society, in February 1967 which influenced the Crime Control and Safe Streets Act of 1968. The act gave $300 million to local police forces for more personnel and equipment. With the election of Richard Nixon in 1968, the attempts to control rising crime rates shifted from a social approach—the War on Poverty—to a tough on crime approach—the "war on crime". In addition to Nixon's criminal attempts (until his resignation in 1974), crime continued to rise from 363.5 crimes per 100,000 people in 1970 to 549.5 in 1979. The Carter administration took the focus away from crime and onto nuclear arms control and human rights. During Carter's presidency, crime continued to be a concern with the "kill-for-thrill murders" of 1979, when two men killed four people over eight days in Western Pennsylvania.

=== Creation ===
The Ad Council was first approached by the Department of Justice in 1977 to create a public campaign to engage the public in reducing crime. The FBI director recommended a campaign playing on fears to convince citizens to take personal safety steps, but the Ad Council rejected their proposal, believing it would largely be ignored by an already frightened public. However, the Ad Council was still interested in a crime prevention campaign. Leo Perlis, a member of the Ad Council's Public Policy Committee, heard the proposal and liked the idea. He met with FBI Director Clarence M. Kelley, the head of the National Council on Crime and Delinquency, and a board member of the National Sheriffs' Association to form a coalition to direct the ad campaign.

The Ad Council gave the creative responsibilities to Dancer Fitzgerald Sample who they had previously worked with on the Keep America Beautiful campaign. On February 8, 1979, the Ad Council's board of directors held a meeting where they and public officials met to listen to data Dancer Fitzgerald Sample had compiled. Dancer Fitzgerald Sample had conducted focus groups in a number of cities to determine public perceptions on crime. The focus groups found that the public believed police should be the ones to prevent crime, but that they were unwilling to pay more in taxes to support more officers. They recommended a campaign which would "emphasize that individual actions can reduce crime" and "offer easily accessible opportunities for people to participate."

The task was given to Jack Keil, executive vice president and creative director of Dancer Fitzgerald Sample. Keil, thinking of Smokey Bear, came up with the idea of an animal mascot. After coming up with the slogan—"Take a bite out of crime"—he settled upon the idea of a dog. His first version was "a Snoopy look-alike wearing a Keystone Cop hat." His creative team, however, did not believe the dog would be taken seriously. In response, he gave the team a day to come up with a new version.

Five teams of two—a copywriter and an art director—produced proposals. The rejected proposals included a bulldog version of J. Edgar Hoover, a golden retriever, an "aggressive-looking deputy dog", and a "mongrel who became a wonder dog". The proposal Keil selected, which would go on to become McGruff, was a talking dog in a trench coat produced by Sherry Nemmers and Ray Krivascy who "was tired...he had seen the world, and he had epitomized all the detectives we had seen from Raymond Chandler to Dashiell Hammett and even Columbo."

While lauded by Keil, the U.S. Department of Justice was less enthused by the idea of a talking dog as the spokesman for crime prevention. By 1979, the Law Enforcement Assistance Administration (LEAA), created by President Johnson, was being criticized for its wastefulness, prompting President Carter to shut down the program. The public safety outreach, part of the LEAA, was one of the few programs saved by Robert Diegelman who was tasked with dismantling the LEAA. Diegelman saw value in the public outreach effort and so sent monthly reports to his superiors in order to assuage their concerns. Despite this, Attorney General Benjamin Civiletti criticized the effort, saying: "Why has the LEAA gotten into a campaign that is spending good money on a talking dog?" Civiletti ordered the campaign be shut down, but the advertisements had already been distributed to the media and were set to run.

In November 1979, the dog was introduced at a press conference in New York City with his slogan "Take a bite out of crime." Eight months later, in July 1980, a nationwide contest to name the dog was concluded. "McGruff the Crime Dog" was selected as the winner with "Shurlocked Homes" as the runner-up. The winning name was submitted by Officer John Isbell of the New Orleans Police Department.

=== Initial impact ===
McGruff was the first Ad Council campaign to be independently evaluated. Garrett O'Keefe of the University of Denver was given a grant of $900,000 by the Justice Department's National Institute of Justice in order to evaluate the campaign. O'Keefe found that "media response to the campaign was excellent. More than $100 million of [ad] time and space had been donated by mid-1981, making McGruff one of the most popular Ad Council campaigns." As a result of the advertisements, over 1 million free booklets had been distributed, and another 250,000 were purchased from the Government Printing Office. The Army printed 300,000 booklets for their own programs as well.

By the end of 1981, over 50% of Americans had seen at least one McGruff advertisement, with one-third reporting they had seen the advertisements more than ten times. The dominant medium of exposure was television advertisements, comprising 78% of views, followed by posters and billboards at 14%, and newspapers at 8%. While the demographics of exposure were notably diverse, there were some trends in who saw the ads more often than others. The ads were found to reach demographics prone to crime—men, youth, people with less stable residences, and those living in lower-working-class neighborhoods—slightly more often than those populations less prone to crime. Of those who had seen the advertisements, 88% were able to articulate what they were "trying to get across", with 28% pointing out the advertisements' goals of getting citizens to participate in crime prevention programs and reporting crime to the police.

O'Keefe also asked some questions related to public perception of McGruff. He found that only 3% disliked McGruff, most calling him "too cutesy", while 57% liked him for being "attention-getting, clever, different, or appealing to all ages." 36% of respondents were neutral to McGruff. 8% said that they were annoyed by the commercials while 59% said that they were "pleased" by them.

In order to assess the impact of the McGruff advertisements, O'Keefe surveyed adults in 1979 and in 1981, a year before and a year after the premiere of the first McGruff advertisement. Of the forty personal security measures that McGruff advertisements recommended, only seven were explicitly mentioned in TV advertisements: locking doors, leaving outdoor lights on, putting indoor lights on timers, asking neighbors to watch your house, watching the neighborhood, reporting suspicious activity, and forming community groups to prevent crime. Of those seven, six saw a significant increase in usage by the public after seeing McGruff advertisements. The only activity not to see an increase was locking doors, despite the first McGruff spot specifically advocating this. O'Keefe hypothesizes that this is due to a plateau effect, as 75% of respondents in 1979 already reported locking their doors; the only personal security measure not mentioned in a television advertisement to see a significant increase was getting a dog.

== Campaigns ==
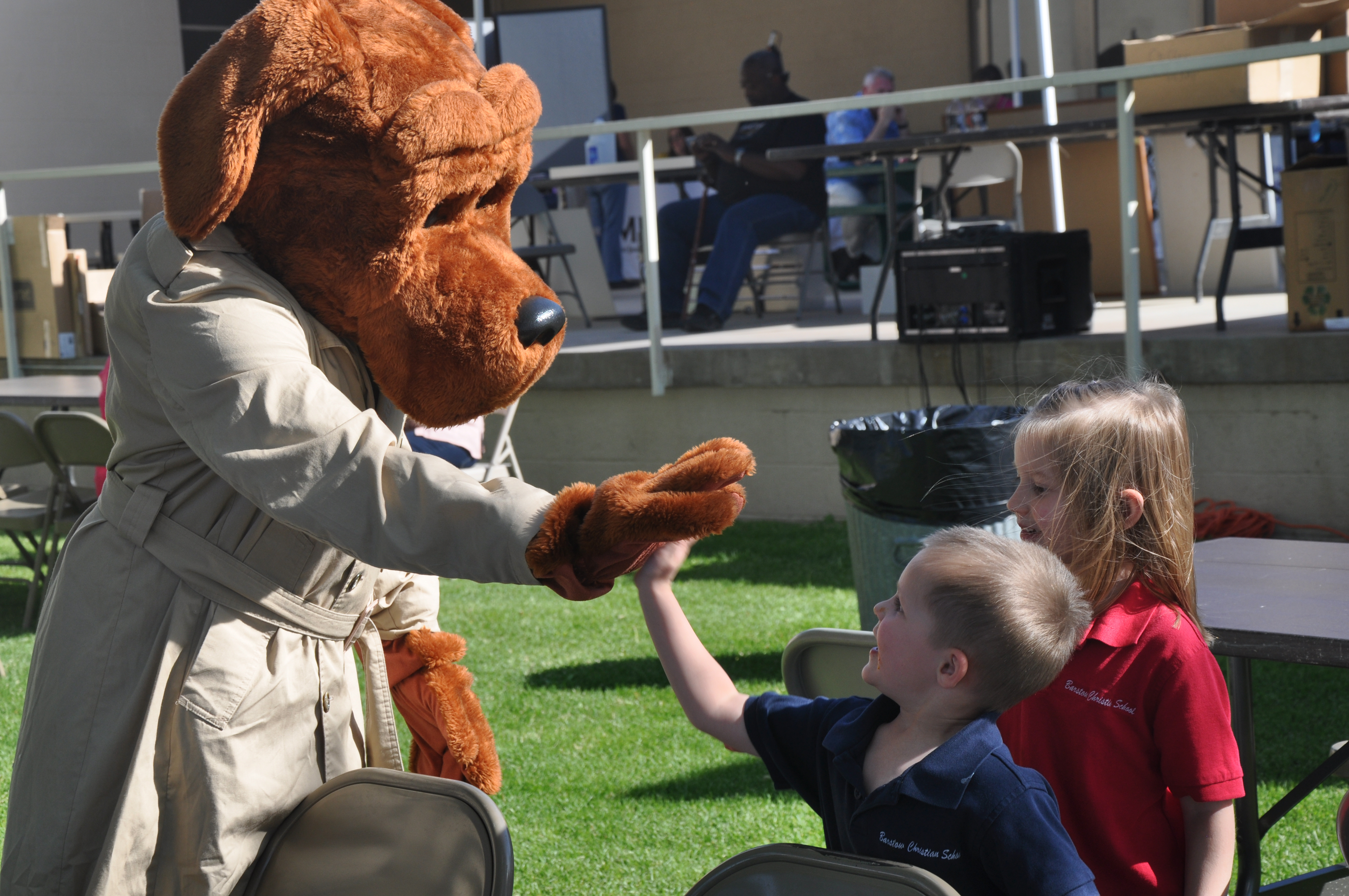
McGruff costumes are often used by law enforcement agencies for outreach with children.

McGruff debuted in 1980 with television, newspaper, billboard, and radio advertisements. The Ad Council and the National Crime Prevention Council still use McGruff in national campaigns to raise awareness about crime and crime prevention strategies. About 1,500 law enforcement agencies use McGruff costumes as part of their outreach efforts in communities. McGruff advertisements feature a "fulfillment strategy", a means of contact for more information. Early advertisements contained PO boxes that could be written to for more information but now contain phone numbers and websites.

McGruff was well received in the 1980s, and current campaigns are similarly recognizable. In a survey done by Harris Interactive for the National Crime Prevention Council, McGruff was known by 9 in 10 adults, teens, and children once being prompted; about 3 in 4 adults, 8 in 10 teens, and 8 in 10 children recognized McGruff without being prompted. Respondents were asked how likely they were to take McGruff's advice. Children were found to be very receptive, with 8 in 10 responding they were likely to take his advice; 7 in 10 teens and 6 in 10 adults gave similar responses.

=== Initial campaign ===
The first McGruff campaign featured three television and radio advertisements as well as billboards and posters. The campaign focused on raising awareness of the ability for citizens to help prevent crime through personal security steps, community awareness, and reporting crimes in progress.

The first television advertisement, "Stop a Crime", debuted in February 1980. The full 60-second advertisement features McGruff (voiced by Jack Keil) entering an unlocked house and telling the viewer, "All crime needs is a chance. Don't give it a chance", before giving tips on preventive measures. These measures included locking doors, turning on exterior lights, securing windows, asking neighbors to watch the house during long absences, and putting lights on timers.

The advertisement was followed by two more which focused on community crime prevention tactics: "The Gilstraps" and "Mimi Marth". In "The Gilstraps", McGruff is backgrounded by men loading furniture into a moving truck. McGruff points out that these are actually thieves stealing from the home of the titular Gilstraps. The camera cuts to the Gilstraps' neighbors who, knowing the Gilstraps are out of town, call the police.

In order to show the effectiveness of community watch, McGruff creator Sherry Nemmers selected actual Hartford resident Mimi Marth for the advertisement which now bears her name. "Mimi Marth" shows Marth and another watch member, Albert Bell, responding to crimes in progress by reporting them to police on their radios. McGruff tells the viewer that "There's 126 of them, regular people like you and me, working against crime."

In addition to advertising and media campaigns, a costume was created for in-person appearances. Approximately 1,500 state and local law enforcement agencies use officers wearing a McGruff costume to educate children and others about crime prevention.

=== Addressing kidnapping, drugs, gun violence, and online fakes ===
The National Crime Prevention Council hired their first president and CEO, Jack Calhoun. Calhoun wanted to address the roots of crime saying, "At some point, I have to step out from my locked house and barred windows." Current plans are to introduce McGruff to a new generation and to have the Crime Dog become a watchdog to combat new criminal and 21st-century online crime. "A greater investment in community interventions will help take a bite out of violent crime," said Paul DelPonte, current head of the National Crime Prevention Council. "Strategies that increase public engagement in public safety are proven crime stoppers." DelPonte also has urged public health officials to use McGruff and crime prevention in health prevention programs.

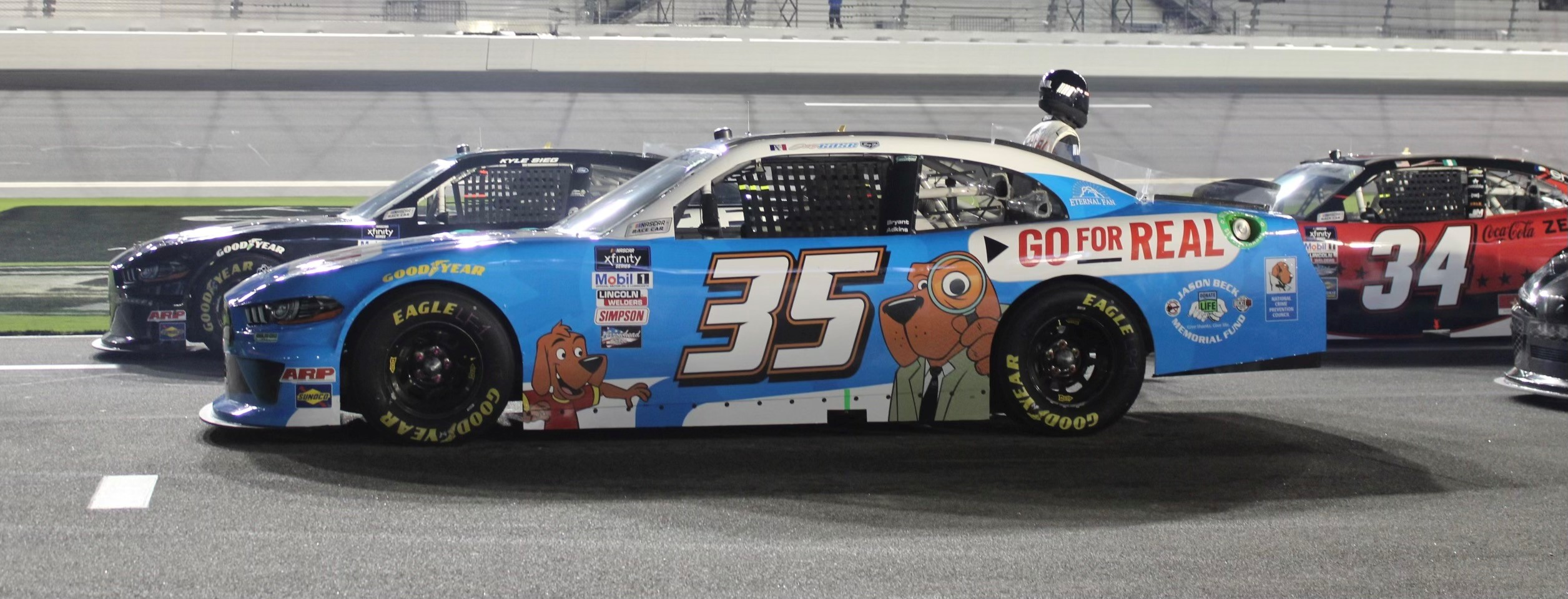
NASCAR driver Joey Gase at Daytona International Speedway

NCPC and McGruff are currently working with the U.S. Patent and Trademark Office to combat the sale of fake products online. The campaign, "You're Smart. Buy Smart.", premiered the first television ads featuring McGruff in 3D animation in August 2022. The ads, filmed on the lot of Jim Henson Studios in Hollywood, are also in Spanish. Among the largest campaigns in the Crime Dog's lengthy career, it includes a partnership with NASCAR and featured a new car with driver Joey Gase.

In December 2021, the animated television show Family Guy featured McGruff and the National Crime Prevention Council on preventing kidnapping. The re-emergence of McGruff generated an outpouring of fan support.

In April 2022, the National Crime Prevention Council announced a partnership with McGruff the Crime Dog in creating Fentanyl Prevention Awareness Day scheduled for August 21, 2022. In October of the same year, the organization launched livesproject.org, a digital remembrance quilt to honor victims and to raise awareness of the problem.

=== McGruff Houses and trucks ===
The McGruff House program was a program that designated temporary safe havens for children in emergency situations. The program was first created in Utah in 1982 in response to the abduction and murder of five children by Arthur Gary Bishop. Owners of houses and apartments, after clearing a background check, would display a sign in their window with the image of McGruff. Children would be educated at school and community events to go to these houses when they felt threatened or in need of help.

The program operated under the motto "we'll call for help" and emphasized its use as a temporary haven. Volunteers were trained to call the appropriate authorities in emergency situations and would provide emotional support to children in danger. The program made clear that volunteers were for emergency situations, and even in such situations, volunteers would not act as escorts or provide first aid "except in extreme emergency situations and then only if qualified."

The first McGruff truck was established in Utah in 1986. A utility company asked that its trucks be designated as "rolling McGruff Houses" and were approved. The program was extended to other companies and municipalities, and by 2006, there were over 170 participants. In February 2012, the McGruff House program was ended after nearly 30 years. The program was ended because, with the advent and growing prominence of cell phones, the need for McGruff Houses declined combined with tightening budgets.

In 2018, the Martin Agency brought back McGruff as part of GEICO Insurance's "count on GEICO" campaign. The TV spot has an animated McGruff attempting to share his investigation evidence with several human colleagues. They respond by not taking him seriously and treating him like an actual dog with "baby talk", leading to McGruff's throwing his paperwork in the air and storming out of the scene.

== See also ==
- National Night Out
- Smokey Bear
