= Cordell (name) =

Cordell or Cordel is a given name and surname, a diminutive cognate of the French "Corde".

== People with the surname ==
- Cordell baronets, a title in the Baronetage of England
  - Sir Robert Cordell, 1st Baronet (c. 1616–c. 1680)
  - Sir John Cordell, 2nd Baronet (1646–1690)
  - Sir John Cordell, 3rd Baronet (1677–1704)
- Alexander Cordell, pen name of George Graber (1914–1997), Welsh novelist
- Bruce Cordell (born 1968), American author of roleplaying games and fantasy novels
- Cathleen Cordell (1915–1997), American film and television actress
- Charles Cordell (1720–1791), English Roman Catholic priest
- Daisy Cordell, British actress of the silent era
- Dana Cordell, Australian sustainability researcher
- Denny Cordell (Dennis Cordell-Lavarack, 1943–1995), English record producer and racehorse trainer
  - Denny Cordell Lavarack Fillies Stakes
- Frank Cordell (1918–1980), British composer, arranger and conductor
- LaDoris Cordell, American retired judge
- Linda S. Cordell (1943–2013), American archaeologist and anthropologist
- Matthew Cordell (fl. from 2009), American author and illustrator of children's books
- Phil Cordell (1947–2007), British musician
- Ritchie Cordell, (1943–2004), American songwriter, singer and record producer
- Ryan Cordell (born 1992), American baseball player
- Tarka Cordell (1966–2008), English musician, writer, record producer, and model
- William Cordell (c. 1522 – 1581), English lawyer, landowner, administrator and politician
- William Cordell (MP) (died 1395/96)

== People with the given name ==
- Cordell Annesley (died 1636), English courtier
- Cordell Barker (born 1956), Canadian animator
- Cordell Barrow (1940–2003), Trinidad and Tobago sailor
- Cordell Broadus (born 1997), son of Snoop Dogg
- Cordell Cato (born 1992), Trinidadian footballer
- Cordell Cleare (born 1965), American activist and politician
- Cordell Crockett (born 1965), American bassist
- Cordell Farrington (born 1968), Bahamian serial killer
- Sir Cordell Firebrace, 3rd Baronet (1712–1759), British landowner and politician
- Cordell Green (born 1941), American computer scientist
- Cordell Hull (1871–1955), American national politician, Secretary of State, and Nobel laureate
- Cordel Hyde (born 1973), Belizean politician
- Cordel Iwuagwu (born 1996), American professional football player
- Cordel Jack (born 1982), West Indies cricketer
- Cordell Jackson (1923–2004), American guitarist and entrepreneur
- Cordell D. Meeks Sr. (1914–1987), American judge
- Cordell Mosson (1952–2013), American musician
- Cordell Reagon (1943–1996), American singer and activist
- Cordell Schachter (born 1960), American technology manager
- Cordell Taylor (born 1973), American football player
- Cordell Volson (born 1998), American football player

== Fictional characters ==
- Matt Cordell, from the film series Maniac Cop
- Cordell Walker, in Walker, Texas Ranger and its reboot Walker
- Cordell Doemling, in Hannibal
- Robert Cordell (Syphon Filter)
