= Best Enemies =

2008 Australian film about cyberbullying in schools

- Type: Educational
- Founded: 2008
- Headquarters: New South Wales, Australia
- Key people: Ross Bark and Darren Bark, Founders
- Website: www.bestenemies.org

Best Enemies is an education resource and film created by Ross and Darren Bark that discusses the cyber bullying problem in Australian schools, and explores how to tackle it and help students become pro-active in reporting and stopping it.

== Programs and services ==
Best Enemies has also been used as a community-based education program that illustrates the issue of cyber bullying through a film based on a true story of a 15-year-old girl whose best friend betrayed her in a bullying campaign conducted via SMS and online messaging.

The program targets schools and youth organisations to address the causes and consequences of the serious social problem of cyber bullying and cyber safety. The program is supported by Youth Interagency Groups, the Department of Education and Training and various agencies of the NSW Government.

The Best Enemies study guide and cybersafety resource was produced by The Australian Teachers of Media and is also distributed by The Education Shop.

The program is supported by Hoyts, Girlfriend Magazine, Mentos Cube, Myspace and Point Zero Youth Services.

== Partnership with Bully Free Australia Foundation ==
In March 2013, Best Enemies and The Bully Free Australia Foundation signed a partnership agreement with a vision to "protect and empower Australian children and adolescents to live a fulfilling life free from all forms of bullying".

On 16 March 2013, the Prime Minister, Julia Gillard formally opened The Bully Free Australia Foundation at Essendon Airport to a crowd of more than 400 people.
