= Cordell Farrington =

Bahamian serial killer

- Born: 1968 (age 57–58); Nassau, Bahamas
- Conviction: Manslaughter (5 counts) (reduced from murder on appeal)
- Penalty: Death; commuted to life imprisonment

Details
- Victims: 5
- Span of crimes: 2002–2003
- Country: Bahamas
- State: Grand Bahama
- Date apprehended: October 26, 2003

Cordell Farrington (born 1968) is a Bahamian serial killer who killed four children and his adult lover from 2002 to 2003. Initially sentenced to death for killing 22-year-old Jamal Robins, he was later resentenced to another count of life imprisonment on the basis of his insanity.

== Early life ==
Farrington was born in 1968, and according to his own claims, was abused as a child. At some point in his life, he had become addicted to crack cocaine but managed to rehabilitate himself over time. Farrington then went on to attempt working at several places, including training as a priest, before settling to work at a warehouse. In his spare time, he would draw pictures of boys crying, some of which were even showcased at exhibitions at the Artists' Association of Grand Bahama.

At some point, he married a woman identified only by the name of 'Dean', with whom he had a daughter. According to Dean, Farrington was a good father, but they eventually had to part ways after she noticed he had begun losing weight too fast and suspected he had taken up smoking crack again.

== Murders and surrender ==
Over a period of five months, a total of 5 boys suddenly vanished overtime from Grand Bahama: Mackinson Colas (11), DeAngelo Mackenzie (13), Junior Reme (11), Desmond Rolle (14) and Jake Grant (12). Grant's case was later determined to be unrelated to the deaths, but the remaining cases shocked the country's population. The Royal Bahamas police detectives couldn't keep up with the pressure from the angry families, and so, they got in contact with Scotland Yard and the FBI.

However, on October 26, 2003, Farrington gave himself up to the police, confessing to the murders of the boys, as well as the killing of his lover Jamal Robins in Freeport in 2002, whom he had met while in a rehabilitation center. He then directed the police to remote parts of the island and to his house, where, in numbered boxes, the bones of some of the children were found.

== Trials and sentence ==
Farrington was soon after arraigned before the court, and was subsequently sentenced to death for killing Robins and an additional four life sentences for the boys' murders. His charges were reduced to manslaughter, as it was determined he suffered from a severe personality disorder.

In 2014, Farrington appeared before the court again, with the request of having his sentence quashed in connection with Robins' killing. He based his reasoning upon the case of Dominic Moss, a man initially convicted of killing a woman in a drunk driving incident and later released from prison. On March 31, 2015, the court quashed the sentence and replaced it with another count of life imprisonment.

== See also ==
- List of serial killers by country
