= National Crime Prevention Council =

Anti-crime organization in the United States

- Abbreviation: NCPC
- Founded: 1982; 44 years ago
- Founder: Carl M. Loeb, Jr.
- Tax ID no.: 13-3129302
- Legal status: 501(c)(3) nonprofit organization
- Headquarters: Washington, D.C., U.S.
- Services: Crime prevention, youth victimization, cyber safety, Go For Real, and community building.
- Executive Director: Paul DelPonte
- Chairman: Lynda Ellis
- Affiliations: National Crime Prevention Council Association Inc
- Revenue: $1,538,715 (2020)
- Expenses: $1,240,207 (2020)
- Endowment: $82,820
- Employees: 6 (2020)
- Volunteers: 11 (2020)
- Website: ncpc.org

National Crime Prevention Council is an American educational 501(c)(3) nonprofit organization in Washington, D.C. which works to help people to create safer communities by addressing the causes of crime, drugs and violence and reducing the opportunities for crime to occur.

The organization's mascot is McGruff the Crime Dog, a talking bloodhound dog character created to educate children about crime prevention. Paul DelPonte, a one-time federal whistleblower, was appointed to head the organization in 2021.

== History ==
Carl M. Loeb, Jr. (son of banker John Langeloth Loeb Sr.), was a former vice chairman of the board of directors of the National Council on Crime and Delinquency. Loeb left that group in order to found the National Crime Prevention Council in 1982, where he served as its chairman. The organization is attempting to introduce the mascot to the next generation of young people. A core of the effort aims to link crime prevention with health.

== Campaigns ==
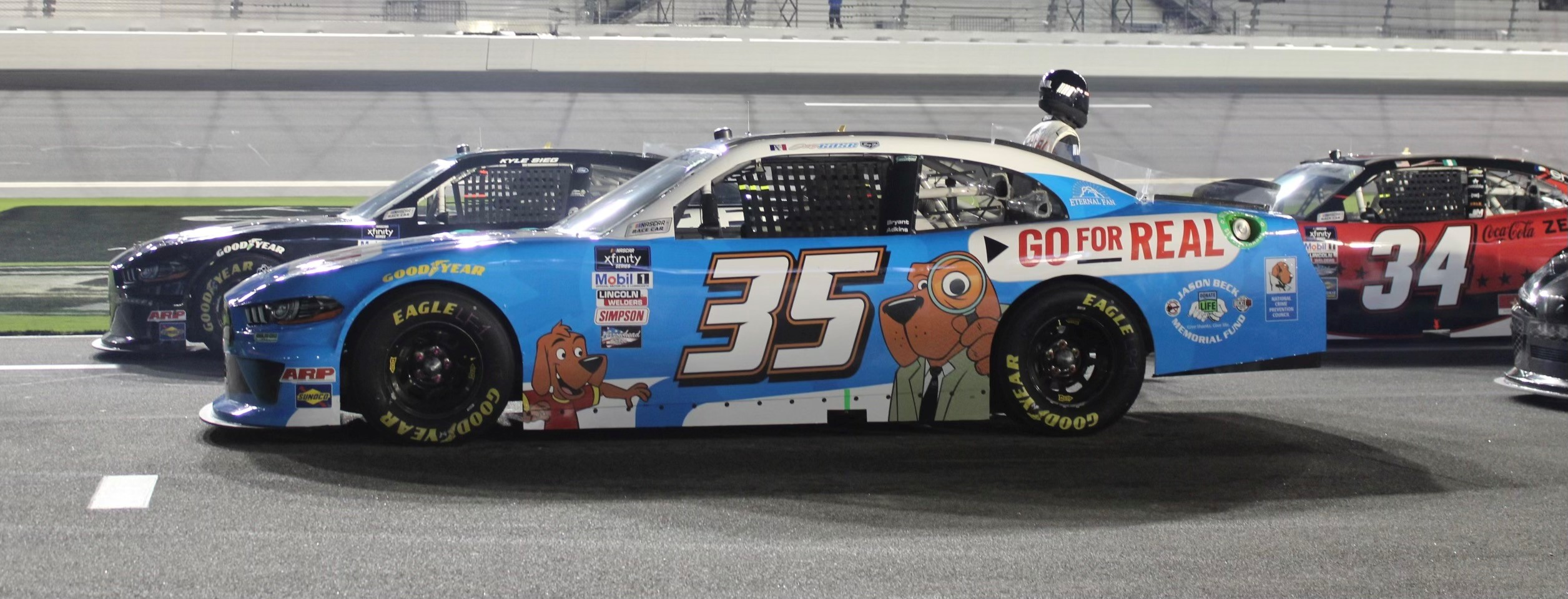
The McGruff car at Daytona International Speedway.

Working with the United States Patent and Trademark Office, the Council ran a national campaign in 2022 to warn consumers on the hazard of purchasing counterfeit goods. The campaign features new ads with McGruff in 3D animation, as well as a race car driven by NASCAR's Joey Gase.

In 1984, the United States Postal Service released a postage stamp with McGruff and his slogan.

In December 2021, McGruff and a public service announcement on kidnapping were featured in the animated television series Family Guy. In July 2022, McGruff made his first full-length movie debut in Disney's Chip 'n Dale: The Rescue Rangers.

In October 2022 the organization launched the Lives Project, to call attention to the growing fentanyl crisis. In December of the same year, the organization wrote to U.S. Attorney General Merrick Garland asking for an investigation into sale of fake drugs containing fentanyl. The following month an investigation was opened.
