= Online social support =

Online social support is an internet-based form of social support. The more people are engaging to express and discuss with other via online community, the more online community getting similar with the social community and have the similar relation between social support and subjective well-being. According to Robbins and Rosenfeld (2001), traditionally, listening support, confirmation, and appreciation are sources of subjective well-being. And Liu and Yu (2013) have stated validation, compliment, and encouragement are the most common types of support from the online community. Also, online friends can be an important source of social support (Ybarra, Mitchell, Palmer, & Reisner, 2015).

Moreover, the number of Facebook friends associated with stronger perceptions of social support, which in turn associated with reduced stress, and in turn less physical illness and greater well-being which found by Nabi and So (2013).

Rozzell, et al. (2014) said that social media tools may allow for social support to be obtained from non-close as well as close relationships, with access to a significant proportion of non-close relationships. Moreover, social support derived from new information and communication technology counteracts the adverse effect of being unemployed (Fieseler, Meckel, & Müller, 2014).
