= Cordell & Cordell =

St. Louis, MO litigation firm

- Headquarters: Saint Louis, Missouri
- No. of offices: 100 offices
- No. of attorneys: Approximately 250 attorneys
- No. of employees: Approximately 400 employees
- Major practice areas: Family Law
- Key people: Joseph E. Cordell, Yvonne Cordell, Allison Cunningham, Frank Murphy, Kristin Zurek, Kelly Burris, Andrew Ordyna, Courtney Knox
- Date founded: 1990
- Website: CordellCordell.com

Cordell & Cordell, P.C. is a Family Law firm with Estate Planning services based in Saint Louis, Missouri, United States, that is frequently cited as the largest family law firm in the country with more than 100 offices and 300 attorneys in 30+ states. The growth has been rapid: in 2002, the firm had just three offices in two states.

== Legal practice ==
The law firm practices Family Law and recently launched Estate Planning. The firms' attorneys handle divorce, legal separation, property and asset division, spousal support, and prenuptial agreements, as well as child custody, child support, paternity matters, and post-decree modifications.

== History ==
Cordell & Cordell was founded in 1990 by Joseph Cordell and his wife, Yvonne. What began as a general practice firm evolved into focusing on representing men in divorce and custody cases when the Cordell's noticed the challenges consistently facing men when it came to issues of custody, alimony, and domestic violence accusations.

In 2001, the firm expanded into Kansas City, added Atlanta in 2004, Indianapolis in 2005, Dallas and Chicago in 2006, and eventually has worked its way into most major cities.

In May 2015, the firm expanded to the United Kingdom and opened its first office in Central London.

== Client-centered approach ==
In a feature piece on Cordell & Cordell, The Cincinnati Enquirer outlined several reasons for the booming growth the firm has experienced, including how its unique customer service practices are notable to the legal profession. The article explained that Cordell & Cordell reviews social media profiles, communication between couples, and other sources as part of their background information gathering efforts.

The Enquirer described how Cordell & Cordell's client care division is responsible for gauging client satisfaction throughout the divorce process. The law firm also uses a metric system to rate client satisfaction and promotes and rewards its lawyers based on these metrics.
