= The Cricket Society =

British charitable organization

The Cricket Society is a not-for-profit organisation formed in 1945 as the Society of Cricket Statisticians at Great Scotland Yard, London. It has grown steadily to be the largest body of its kind in the cricket world. The Cricket Society now has over 1,550 members in the United Kingdom and the cricket playing countries of the world. Its current President is John Barclay. The Society celebrates the best of cricket, past, present and future through events, awards, publications and playing via The Cricket Society XI and supporting state schools cricket through the Cricket Society Trust.

The Cricket Society celebrated its 80th birthday on 17 November 2025 with an all-star dinner in London. Several tributes were made to The Society and its long history, notably by among others David Kynaston and President, John Barclay.

== Awards and Honours ==
Awards are presented at the Society's Autumn Lunch and the 2026 winners were:-

- Most Promising Young Male Cricketer - winner in 2026 - Naavya Sharma
- Most Promising Young Female Cricketer - winner in 2026 - Tilly Corteen-Coleman
- The Ian Jackson Award for Services to Cricket - winner in 2026 - Paul Farbrace
- The Sir Jack Hobbs Silver Jubilee Memorial Prize (Schoolboy Cricketer of the Year) - winner in 2026 Monty Ramsden
- The Charlotte Edwards Award (Schoolgirl Cricketer of the Year) - winner in 2026 - Skye Thomas
- The Don Rowan Trophy - winner in 2026 - Bensham Manor School, Thornton Heath
- The Perry Lewis/Kershaw Memorial Trophy - winner in 2026 - Alan Newman
- Wetherell Trophy for best piece of inidvidual journalism - winner in 2026 - Tanya Aldred

== Books and Scholarship Awards ==
The Cricket Society established its Book of the Year Award in 1970 and, in partnership with MCC since 2009, now hosts an annual Awards Evening each spring in the Long Room at Lord's with the 2026 winner being Richard Whitehead for 'Victory in Australia'.

In 2020 the Society instituted the Howard Milton Award for Cricket Scholarship in partnership with the British Society of Sports History which is given to an individual or institution that has contributed a significant body of work to the history of the game. Recent winners include Ramachandra Guha (2022), Clem Seecharan (2023), The Association of Cricket Statisticians and Historians (2024) and Neil Robinson, Head of Heritage & Collections at MCC (2025). Andre Odendaal was awarded the Howard Milton Award for Cricket Scholarship in 2026.

== Meetings and Events ==
Throughout the year, The Society holds regular meetings for members and guests, featuring famous names from cricket at venues in Central London, most notably as the Union Jack Club and the Civil Service Club.

The Society also holds regular meetings for the members in Bath and Birmingham at which invited speakers address the audience. The Southwest and Midlands branches are chaired by Stephen Chalke and Mike Williams respectively. Both are supported by Committees of dedicated cricket followers who organise impressive schedules supported by substantial audiences.

In addition The Cricket Society runs on-line monthly interviews with cricketing luminaries throughout the UK autumn and winter. This allows those who cannot attend meetings in London, Bath and Birmingham to enjoy hearing from important figures in the game.

During the UK summer The Cricket Society continues to organise events including the popular 'Days at the Cricket'. In 2026 Society members and friends attended Day 2 of the England v India Women's Test match at Lord's, a Minor Counties match at Chesham in August between Buckinghamshire CCC and Suffolk CCC and a County Championship match at Cheltenham College between Gloucestershire CCC and Worcestershire CCC as well as watching games at Wormsley Cricket Club and Eastnor Cricket Club.

== Playing Cricket ==
The Society has a cricket team (The Cricket Society XI) which plays over 30 games each season in South London, South West London, Surrey and Sussex primarily on Sundays and mid-week. In 2026 there was a full fixture list including games against Cricket Media Club. The Society XI won 16 of the 30 games that they played.

== Charitable Work ==
Through its charitable arm, The Cricket Society Trust, the Society raises money to give state school educated children greater opportunity to play cricket. The Cricket Society Trust supports a state schools tournament at Kimbolton School each year in conjunction with the R66T Academy and the MCC Foundation.

== Publications ==
The Cricket Society publishes a Journal (bi-annually) and a regular news Bulletin (six times per annum) for its subscribed membership. The Journal features cricket writing spanning the full history of the game, while The Bulletin focuses on the modern game and also reports on the many Society events and activities.

== Bibliography of Cricket ==
Over 45 years ago, The Society commissioned E.W. Padwick to compile a comprehensive bibliography of cricket literature under the title A Bibliography of Cricket. The first edition, published in 1977 by the Library Association had 8,294 entries. A revised edition, published in 1984, extended this to over 10,000 entries (ISBN 978-0853659020). A second volume, published in 1991 as Padwick's Bibliography of Cricket, Volume 2, was compiled by Stephen Eley and Peter Griffiths and covers works published between 1980 and 1990 (ISBN 978-0853655282).

== The Cricket Society/MCC Book of the Year ==
The Cricket Society began naming a book of the year in 1970. Since 2009 the award has been made in partnership with MCC. It carries a prize of £3000, which is presented at an awards evening each spring in the Long Room at Lord's.

- 1970: "My Dear Victorious Stod": A Biography of A. E. Stoddart by David Frith
- 1971: Nottinghamshire Cricketers 1821–1914 by Peter Wynne-Thomas
- 1972: Thanks to Cricket by J. M. Kilburn
- 1973: Sort of a Cricket Person by E. W. Swanton
- 1974: The Story of Warwickshire Cricket 1882–1972 by Leslie Duckworth
- 1975: Learie Constantine by Gerald Howat
- 1976: On Top Down Under: Australia's Cricket Captains by Ray Robinson
- 1977: Spinner's Yarn by Ian Peebles
- 1978: Sir Donald Bradman: A Biography by Irving Rosenwater
- 1979: The Best Loved Game by Geoffrey Moorhouse
- 1980: Barclay's World of Cricket by E. W. Swanton and John Woodcock
- 1981: P. G. H. Fender: A Biography by Richard Streeton
- 1982: Phoenix from the Ashes by Mike Brearley
- 1983: Australian Cricket: The Game and the Players by Jack Pollard
- 1984: C.B.: The Life of Charles Burgess Fry by Clive Ellis
- 1985: The Art of Captaincy by Mike Brearley
- 1986: Hedley Verity: A Portrait of a Cricketer by Alan Hill
- 1987: Pageant of Cricket by David Frith
- 1988: The Players: A Social History of the Professional Cricketer by Ric Sissons
- 1989: A La Recherche du Cricket Perdu by Simon Barnes
- 1990: History of Indian Cricket by Mihir Bose
- 1991: Herbert Sutcliffe: Cricket Maestro by Alan Hill
- 1992: England Expects: A Biography of Ken Barrington by Mark Peel
- 1993: Beyond Bat & Ball by David Foot
- 1994: Arlott: The Authorised Biography by David Rayvern Allen
- 1995: David Gower: A Man Out of Time by Rob Steen
- 1996: Bradman: An Australian Hero by Charles Williams
- 1997: The Glory Days of Cricket: The Extraordinary Story of Broadhalfpenny Down by Ashley Mote
- 1998: The Chronicle of W. G. by J. R. Webber; W. G. Grace: A Life by Simon Rae (shared)
- 1999: The Social History of English Cricket by Derek Birley
- 2000: Mystery Spinner: The Story of Jack Iverson by Gideon Haigh
- 2001: At the Heart of English Cricket: The Life and Memories of Geoffrey Howard by Stephen Chalke
- 2002: A Corner of a Foreign Field: The Indian History of a British Sport by Ramachandra Guha
- 2003: The Ross Gregory Story by David Frith
- 2004: Jim: The Life of E. W. Swanton by David Rayvern Allen
- 2005: Red Shirts and Roses by Eric Midwinter
- 2006: Cricket's Burning Passion: Ivo Bligh and the Story of the Ashes by Scyld Berry and Rupert Peploe
- 2007: George Lohmann: Pioneer Professional by Keith Booth
- 2008: No award with this date. Before 2008 the award was for books published in the year of the award; after 2008 the award was for books published the previous year.
- 2009: Life Beyond the Airing Cupboard by John Barclay
- 2010: Of Didcot and the Demon: The Cricketing Times of Alan Gibson by Anthony Gibson
- 2011: Slipless in Settle by Harry Pearson
- 2012: Fred Trueman: The Authorised Biography by Chris Waters
- 2013: On Warne by Gideon Haigh
- 2014: The Great Tamasha: Cricket, Corruption and the Turbulent Rise of Modern India by James Astill
- 2015: Field of Shadows: The English Cricket Tour of Nazi Germany 1937 by Dan Waddell
- 2016: Fire in Babylon by Simon Lister
- 2017: A Beautiful Game: My Love Affair with Cricket by Mark Nicholas
- 2018: Connie: The Marvellous Life of Learie Constantine by Harry Pearson
- 2019: Steve Smith's Men: Behind Australian Cricket's Fall by Geoff Lemon
- 2020: The Great Romantic: Cricket and the Golden Age of Neville Cardus by Duncan Hamilton; The Final Innings: The Cricketers of Summer 1939 by Christopher Sandford (shared)
- 2021: The Unforgiven by Ashley Gray
- 2022: Who Only Cricket Know: Hutton's Men in the West Indies 1953/54 by David Woodhouse
- 2023: An Island's Eleven: The Story of Sri Lankan Cricket by Nicholas Brookes
- 2024: The Tour: The Story of the England Cricket Team Overseas 1877-2022 by Simon Wilde
- 2025: Worrell by Simon Lister
- 2026: Victory in Australia: The Remarkable Story of England's Greatest Ashes Triumph 1954-55 by Richard Whitehead

== Current officers ==
- President: John Barclay
- Vice President: Charlotte Edwards
- Vice President: Chris Lowe
- Vice President: Vic Marks
- Vice President: Sir Tim Rice
- Vice President: George Dobell
- Vice President: Daniel Norcross

== Executive Committee ==
- Chair: Peter Hardy
- Vice Chair: Raf Nicholson
- Secretary: Matthew Stevenson
- Assistant Secretary: Nigel Kalb
- Treasurer: Phil Reeves
- Membership Secretary: Matthew Stevenson
- Derek Barnard
- Annie Chave
- Nigel Hancock
- Barry Kitcherside
- Nick Tudball
- David Stanworth
- Phillip Bennett-Richards

== Presidents since 1945 ==
1• 1945-1946 F. A. Mackinnon, The Mackinnon of Mackinnon
2• 1947-1959 Hubert Preston
3• 1960-1961 H. S. Altham
4• 1961-1962 Lord Birkett
5• 1963-1968 A. A. Thomson
6• 1969-1973 Lt-Gen Sir Oliver Leese
7• 1974-1975 A. M. Crawley
8• 1976-1983 E. W. Swanton
9• 1983-1998 G. H. G. Doggart
10• 1998-2008 C. D. A. Martin-Jenkins
11• 2008-onwards J. R. T. Barclay

== Chairs since 1945 ==
1• 1945-1946 A. Weigall
2• 1946-1947 Capt. J. A. Bayliss
3• 1947-1953 G. A. Copinger
4• 1953-1960 A. R. Whitaker
5• 1960-1965 Dr R. W. Cockshut
6• 1965-1966 L. E. S. Gutteridge
7• 1966-1983 C. C. W. Box-Grainger
8• 1983-1992 R. N. Haygarth
9• 1992-2003 D. Allsop
10• 2003-2008 W. R. Allen
11• 2008 I. R. Jackson
12• 2008-2012 D. E. Barnard
13• 2012-2021 N. Hancock
14. 2023 - to date P. M. Hardy
