= David Foot (journalist) =

British journalist and historian (1929–2021)

David Foot (24 April 1929 – 25 May 2021) was a British journalist and historian who wrote extensively on English cricket and the West Country.

Foot was born in the Somerset village of East Coker, living as a child in a cottage without electricity or running water, and spent most of his life in Somerset and Gloucestershire. He began his journalistic career with the Western Gazette in Yeovil before moving on to the Bristol Evening World, where he was the drama critic, at this time cricket being only a minor part of his writing. After the paper closed in 1962 he worked largely as a freelance, and even appeared as an extra in the TV series Softly, Softly. In the national press he contributed primarily to The Guardian from 1971 to 2011, writing chiefly on Somerset and Gloucestershire cricket, together with some football reports and theatre reviews. He also wrote a weekly column for the Western Daily Press for about 20 years. According to Scyld Berry, he was one of the last regional writers. It was "not only the quality of his work, but the speed" with which he wrote that was remarkable.

Foot's book Beyond Bat & Ball won the Cricket Society’s Book of the Year award in 1993. Reviewing it in Wisden, Geoffrey Moorhouse agreed with the opinion of Dennis Silk in the book's foreword that as a writer Foot "is as good as Robertson-Glasgow at his best". Silk also said: "If the cricket lover is not quite clear about why he loves the game, he will become much clearer after reading this book."

The sport journalist Frank Keating called Foot's biographies of Harold Gimblett and Wally Hammond "imperishable classics in cricket's canon". Before Gimblett committed suicide, he had entrusted to Foot the tapes he had recorded about his cricket career. By incorporating quotations from those tapes in his biography and revealing Gimblett's mental anguish, Foot "removed our rose-coloured spectacles about cricket" and helped to enable other cricketers such as Peter Roebuck and Marcus Trescothick to speak out about their own mental problems.

According to Berry, Foot was "fascinated by every aspect of life". This was illustrated by his taking on the editorship of the memoir of Victoria Hughes, a lavatory attendant who took care of the prostitutes who worked at the lavatories on Bristol Downs. Berry says this was one of Foot's most valuable books. He was "the dearest and most decent of men, because he had acute sensibility for people, and trees, and words".

Foot lived in the Bristol suburb of Westbury-on-Trym with his wife Anne. They had a son and a daughter. He died in May 2021, aged 92.

== Books ==
- Game for Anything (1972; David Foot with Alan Gibson and Derek Robinson)
- Ladies' Mile by Victoria Hughes (1977; edited)
- Gardening My Way by John Abrams (1978; edited)
- Famous Bristolians: And Others Having Strong Associations with the City (1979)
- Viv Richards by Viv Richards, with David Foot (1979, 1982)
- From Grace to Botham: Profiles of 100 West Country Cricketers (1980)
- Zed: Zaheer Abbas by Zaheer Abbas, with David Foot (1983)
- Harold Gimblett: Tormented Genius of Cricket (1984)
- Learn Cricket with Viv Richards: A Young Player's Guide by Viv Richards, with David Foot (1985)
- Cricket's Unholy Trinity (1985)
- Sunshine, Sixes and Cider: The History of Somerset Cricket (1986)
- Viv Richards (1987)
- Country Reporter (1990)
- 40 Years On: The Story of the Lord's Taverners (1990)
- Strange Dorset Stories (1991)
- Somerset Cricket: A Post-War Who's Who (1993; with Ivan Ponting)
- Beyond Bat & Ball: Eleven Intimate Portraits (1993)
- Wally Hammond: The Reasons Why: A Biography (1996)
- Fragments of Idolatry: From "Crusoe" to Kid Berg: Twelve Character Studies (2001)
- Shep: My Autobiography by David Shepherd, with David Foot (2001)
- Sixty Summers: Somerset Cricket since the War (2006; with Ivan Ponting)
- Footsteps from East Coker (2010)
- Footprints – David Foot’s Lifetime of Writing (2023; collected and edited by Stephen Chalke)
