= Dennis Freedman =

Australian writer and satirist

- Occupations: Cricket writer; blogger; podcaster; satirist

Dennis Freedman is an Australian cricket writer, blogger, podcaster and satirist. He previously ran a website called "Dennis Does Cricket", where he recorded podcasts and wrote articles and commentary about cricket. The website is now closed. He has also written for various publications, including Fox Sports, The Cricketer, All Out Cricket, Firstpost, The Quint, ScoopWhoop, Dawn, Geo News, Sportskeeda, Sporting News and The Roar, among others. He made a documentary on Pakistan and Pakistani cricket which can be found on YouTube called "Dennis Does Pakistan". He also covered PSL3 in the UAE and PSL5 in Pakistan

== Personal life ==
Dennis Freedman was born to Australian parents. He is of Polish-Jewish, Romanian and English heritage. His grandfather, who was Polish, migrated to Australia after escaping from the Nazi regime during World War II.

== Work ==
Freedman used to host a podcast by the name of the "Can't Bowl, Can't Throw Cricket Show", which was broadcast on Australian radio. He started off as a freelance writer, mainly writing articles and blogs relating to cricket, and having a social media presence on platforms such as YouTube and Twitter.

He has extensively covered Pakistani cricket. In 2017, he visited the country and shot a documentary titled "Dennis Does Pakistan", in which he explored the nation's "love affair with cricket". The 90-minute documentary, which was produced in collaboration with the website Cricingif, featured Freedman traveling throughout Pakistan and documenting its cricketing history, its high and low moments, the local infrastructure and mass following for the game, and some interviews with prominent former cricketers such as Imran Khan, Zaheer Abbas, Sikander Bakht, Aqib Javed and Misbah-ul-Haq, among others. According to Freedman, he wanted the documentary to explore what it was that made Pakistan a dominant force in cricket, while also attempting to break down some stereotypes. Since then, he has returned to cover subsequent editions of the Pakistan Super League (PSL) held across Pakistan and the UAE.

== Controversies ==
Freedman's satirical and humorous style have often attracted online trolling, especially in social media posts which appear to take a jibe at India or the Indian cricket team. Freedman has claimed he takes the trolling lightly, and laughs it away.

Freedman criticize IPL and BCCI and said: "It pretends to be there to help young people, but it is only there to make money. A lot of cash. And power comes with money. And the BCCI is obsessed with power. There is no misunderstanding about what the IPL is all about." He admire Pakistan Cricket and PSL for the quality cricket: "It is pure. It is Pakistan. It’s the PSL mate. It loves you as much as you will love it.”
