= Stephen Chalke =

English writer on cricket

Stephen Chalke (born 5 June 1948) is an English author and publisher, particularly of books on cricket and cricketers.

Chalke was born in Salisbury, Wiltshire. He has two undergraduate degrees – one in Drama, English and Philosophy, the other in Mathematics – and a postgraduate degree in English Literature. He has taught in adult, further and higher education, but since the late 1990s he has increasingly concentrated on writing and publishing. For many years he worked for the Open University. In an article in the 2010 edition of Wisden Cricketers' Almanack he is identified as "an author, publisher and captain of the Winsley Third XI". He retired from playing cricket in 2013 at the age of 65.

Chalke's cricket-writing career began after he received some coaching from the former Somerset player Ken Biddulph in the early 1990s. He wrote down some of Biddulph's reminiscences, then interviewed other players from the 1950s and collected their cricket memories into his first book, Runs in the Memory. None of the publishers he approached thought the book was commercially viable, so he formed his own publishing firm, Fairfield Books, and published it himself. Its first review was in The Guardian where Frank Keating named it as his Sports Book of the Year.

Through Fairfield Books, Chalke has written and published numerous biographical and historical cricket books. His collaboration with Geoffrey Howard, At the Heart of English Cricket, won the 2002 Cricket Society Book of the Year Award, and he has three times won the Wisden Book of the Year award: in 2004 with No Coward Soul (his biography of Bob Appleyard, co-written with Derek Hodgson), in 2008 with Tom Cartwright – The Flame Still Burns and in 2024 with One Hell of a Life (his biography of Brian Close). In 2009 he won the National Sporting Club's Cricket Book of the Year with The Way It Was – Glimpses of English Cricket's Past, a collection of more than 100 articles written for The Wisden Cricketer, Wisden Cricket Monthly and The Times. The Way It Was won the 'Best Cricket Book' category of the 2009 British Sports Book Awards. Summer's Crown, his history of the county championship, was the Cricket Writers Club's Book of the Year in 2015. In the 2010 edition of Wisden, he contributed a 10-page article on English cricket and the Second World War.

Chalke retired from Fairfield Books at the end of 2019, having run it for more than 20 years. During that time Fairfield produced 42 books, of which Chalke wrote 19. Other authors include David Foot, John Barclay, Fred Rumsey, Peter Walker, Mark Wagh, Anthony Gibson and Simon Lister. In all, eight of the books he published as Fairfield Books won awards.

Chalke has received five national awards for services to cricket. In 2009 The Cricket Society awarded him the inaugural Ian Jackson Award for distinguished service to cricket. In 2015 The Association of Cricket Statisticians and Historians gave him their annual award for his contributions to the field of cricket history. In 2019 The Cricket Writers' Club awarded him the Peter Smith Award for services to the presentation of cricket. In 2020 the Cricket Memorabilia Society gave him their Award of Excellence in recognition of his work in preserving cricket history. In 2022 he was the second winner (after Wisden) of the Stephen Fay Award for his services to cricket publishing. In a profile in the 2020 edition of Wisden Cricketers' Almanack, Richard Whitehead wrote that 'Chalke's story goes deeper than the acclaim of critics or the collecting of awards. In gathering the memories of a generation of unsung cricketers, he gave a voice to players who would otherwise have been forgotten.'

After retiring from running Fairfield Books, Chalke has continued to write. His biography of Brian Close, One Hell of a Life - Brian Close: Daring, Defiant and Daft won the Wisden Book of the Year award for 2024. It is the third time he has won this award.

== Publications ==
- Runs in the Memory: County Cricket in the 1950s (1997, ISBN 0-95311-960-2) Ken Taylor (Illustrator), Frank Keating's "Guardian Book of the Year"
- Caught in the Memory: County Cricket in the 1960s (1999, ISBN 0-95311-961-0) Ken Taylor (Illustrator)
- One More Run (2000, ISBN 0-95311-962-9) (with Bryan "Bomber" Wells)
- At the Heart of English Cricket: The Life and Memories of Geoffrey Howard (2001, ISBN 0-95311-964-5) (with Geoffrey Howard), Winner of the Cricket Society Book of the Year
- Guess My Story: The Life and Opinions of Keith Andrew, Cricketer (2003, ISBN 0-95311-968-8)
- No Coward Soul: The Remarkable Story of Bob Appleyard (2003) (with Derek Hodgson), Winner of the Wisden Book of the Year
  - 2nd Revised edition (2008, ISBN 0-95448-869-5)
- Ken Taylor: Drawn to Sport (2006, ISBN 0-95448-862-8)
- A Summer of Plenty: George Herbert Hirst in the Summer of 1906 (2006, ISBN 0-95448-865-2)
- Tom Cartwright: The Flame Still Burns (2007, ISBN 0-95448-866-0), Winner of the Wisden Book of the Year
- Five Five Five: Holmes and Sutcliffe in 1932 (2007, ISBN 0-95448-868-7)
- The Way It Was: Glimpses of English Cricket's Past (2008, ISBN 0-95607-021-3), Winner of the National Sporting Club Cricket Book of the Year
  - 2nd edition, illustrated, revised (2011, ISBN 0-95685-111-8)
- Now I'm 62: The Diary of an Ageing Cricketer (2010, ISBN 0-95607-028-0)
- A Long Half Hour: Six Cricketers Remembered (on Arthur Milton, Geoff Edrich, 'Bomber' Wells, Dickie Dodds, Ken Biddulph and Eric Hill) (2010, ISBN 0-95607-026-4)
- Micky Stewart and the Changing Face of Cricket (2012, ISBN 0-95685-112-6)
- Gentlemen, Gypsies and Jesters: The Wonderful World of Wandering Cricket (2013) (with Anthony Gibson), proceeds to Chance to Shine cricket charity
- Summer's Crown: The Story of Cricket's County Championship (2015, ISBN 0-95685-115-0), Winner of the Cricket Writers' Club Book of the Year
- Team Mates (2016, ISBN 0-95685-117-7) (Edited with John Barclay), proceeds to Arundel Castle Cricket Foundation charity
- In Sunshine and in Shadow (2017, ISBN 0-95685-119-3), the authorised biography of the former Yorkshire and England offspinner Geoff Cope
- Through the Remembered Gate (2019, ISBN 9781999655891), the story of Fairfield Books
- Footprints (2023, ISBN 9781739929343), the life story and writings of David Foot
- One Hell of a Life - Brian Close: Daring, Defiant and Daft (2024, ISBN 9781739929367), Winner of the Wisden Book of the Year
- Pack Your Bags, Brother: The cricketing journey of Mark Alleyne (2026, IBSN 978-1739929381).
