= Kevin Loney =

Irish cricketer (born 1951)

Personal information
- Full name: Joseph Kevin Loney
- Born: 30 August 1951 (age 75); Lurgan, Northern Ireland
- Batting: Left-handed
- Bowling: Right-arm medium

Domestic team information
- Years: Team
- 1974: Cambridge University

Career statistics
Competition	First-class	List A
Matches	2	1
Runs scored	4	35
Batting average	2.00	35.00
100s/50s	–/–	–/–
Top score	4	35
Catches/stumpings	–/–	–/–
- Source: Cricinfo, 8 September 2020

Joseph Kevin Loney (born 30 August 1951) is an Irish former cricketer.

Loney was born in Northern Ireland at Lurgan in August 1951. He later studied in England at Emmanuel College at the University of Cambridge. While studying at Cambridge, he made two appearances in first-class cricket for Cambridge University against Kent and Warwickshire at Fenner's in 1974, scoring 4 runs. He also made a single appearance for Cambridge in List A one-day cricket in the 1974 Benson & Hedges Cup against Sussex at Hove, opening the batting and scoring 35 runs before being dismissed by John Barclay, which was the highest score in the Cambridge innings of 94 all out in response to Sussex's 280 for 5.
