= David Frith =

Cricket writer and historian

David Edward John Frith (born 16 March 1937) is an English cricket writer and historian. Cricinfo describes him as "an author, historian, and founding editor of Wisden Cricket Monthly".

== Life and career ==
David Frith was born in Gloucester Terrace in London, not far from Lord's, on 16 March 1937.

The family resided in Rayners Lane, Harrow, whilst he attended Roxbourne School. In 1949, he emigrated with his family to Australia, arriving in Sydney aboard the RMS Orion on 25 February 1949.

After leaving Canterbury Boys' High School on 15 February 1954 he started his first job as a copy-boy for The Daily Mirror but left after two months to join the Commonwealth Bank where he was posted to the Cronulla branch. He played his early cricket for the famous St George club and then Paddington before returning to England in 1964.

=== Return to Sydney ===
After the death of his mother in May 1971, family commitments led Frith to move back to Sydney. Here he sought, to no avail, a full-time cricket related post but, thanks to a recommendation by Jack Fingleton, he did secure some work with the Australian News and Information Bureau. The return to Australia would prove to be short-lived and he moved back to the United Kingdom departing aboard the TSS Fairstar on 19 March 1972.

=== Magazine editing ===
Commencing with the November 1972 issue, he succeeded Tony Pawson as deputy editor of The Cricketer before becoming editor from the March 1973 issue. He founded Wisden Cricket Monthly and edited it from June 1979 to February 1996. In 1988 Frith won the Sports Council's British Sports Journalism award as Magazine Sports Writer of the Year.

Specialising in Ashes Test match history, Frith has written dozens of books on both cricket in modern times and cricket of the past. His major works include My Dear Victorious Stod (a biography of A. E. Stoddart), a lavishly illustrated history of England versus Australia, Silence of the Heart (on cricket's suicides, an expansion of his earlier book By His Own Hand), The Fast Men, The Slow Men (about fast bowlers and spinners respectively), Pageant of Cricket (the only cricket book to have as many as 2000 pictures), Caught England, Bowled Australia (autobiography), The Trailblazers (the first English tour of Australia, in 1861–62), The Archie Jackson Story (biography) and Bodyline Autopsy. The catalogue of his vast collection ran to 1100 pages. He has also been involved in producing cricket videos, which have been extremely successful.

Frith famously commented that India should withdraw from the World Cup if they did not improve. When they won it in 1983 he was pleased to (literally) eat his words, with the help of some red wine, claiming that he had helped spur India to victory.

In association with the National Film and Television Archive, he presented an annual archive cricket film evening at the National Film Theatre in London for 30 years.

In 2003 Frith became the first author to win the Cricket Society's Book of the Year award three times, and was also a finalist in the William Hill Sports Book awards for his Bodyline Autopsy. The book also won Wisden's book of the year and, in January 2010, it won Cricketweb's award for "book of the decade". In his assessment, Martin Chandler wrote:

"Autopsy" is a magnificent book possessing a vibrancy and objectivity that when I first read it I found quite remarkable. It is, without question, the CW "Book of the Decade" and were there any prospect of my being around to collect I would certainly place a large wager on whoever is writing this feature in 90 years time confirming it as CW "Book of the Century".

His co-written history of the Australian Cricket Board won the Australian Cricket Society book award in 2007, and in 2011 Frith was given the Cricket Society's Ian Jackson Award for Distinguished Services to Cricket.

He has been honorary vice-president of the Cricket Memorabilia Society since its foundation in 1987.

In 2013 he was awarded honorary life membership of the Association of Cricket Statisticians and Historians, and wrote a further book, Guildford's Cricket Story, which revealed his adopted home town's unique claims to being the 'cradle of cricket'.

== Books by Frith ==
- Runs in the Family (by John Edrich; as told to David Frith). London: Stanley Paul. 1969. ISBN 0090978404.
- 'My Dear Victorious Stod': a biography of A. E. Stoddart (Limited ed. of 400 numbered and signed copies). New Malden: The Author. 1970. ISBN 0950183709.
- The Archie Jackson Story: a biography (Limited ed. of 1000 numbered and signed copies). Ashurst: The Cricketer. 1974. ISBN 0902211021.
- The Fast Men: a 200-year cavalcade of speed bowlers. Wokingham: Van Nostrand Reinhold. 1975. ISBN 0442301502.
- Cricket Gallery: fifty profiles of famous players from 'The Cricketer' (Edited by David Frith). Guildford: Lutterworth Press. 1976. ISBN 071887000X.
- Great Moments in Cricket (As Andrew Thomas, editor with Norman Harris). London: Queen Anne Press. 1976. ISBN 0362002711.
- England versus Australia: a pictorial history of the test matches since 1877. Guildford: Lutterworth Press. 1977. ISBN 0718870123.
- The Ashes '77 (with Greg Chappell). London: Angus & Robertson. 1977. ISBN 0207957924.
- The Golden Age of Cricket, 1890–1914. Guildford: Lutterworth Press. 1978. ISBN 0718870220.
- The Illustrated History of Test Cricket (Edited by Martin Tyler and David Frith). London: Marshall Cavendish. 1979. ISBN 0856857068.
- The Ashes '79. London: Angus & Robertson. 1979. ISBN 0207142645.
- Thommo (Jeff Thomson, the world's fastest bowler, tells his own story to David Frith). London: Angus & Robertson. 1980. ISBN 0207140340.
- Rothmans Presents 100 Years England v Australia: the complete history of the Ashes (with Doug Ibbotson and Ralph Dellor). Aylesbury: Rothmans Publications. 1982. ISBN 0907574033.
- The Slow Men. London: Allen & Unwin. 1984. ISBN 0047960698.
- Cricket's Golden Summer : paintings in a garden (by Gerry Wright; with a commentary by David Frith). London: Pavilion. 1985. ISBN 090751667X.
- England v Australia Test match Records 1877–1985 (Edited by David Frith). London: Willow. 1986. ISBN 0002181983.
- Pageant of Cricket. London: Macmillan. 1987. ISBN 0333451775.
- Guildford jubilee 1938–1988: fifty years of county cricket. Guildford: Guildford C.C. 1988.
- By His Own Hand: A Study of Cricket's Suicides. London: Stanley Paul. 1991. ISBN 0091746876.
- Stoddy's mission: the First Great Test Series 1894–1895. Harpenden: Queen Anne Press. 1994. ISBN 1852915617.
- Test match Year 1996–97 (Edited by David Frith). London: Penguin Books. 1997. ISBN 0140264493.
- Caught England, Bowled Australia: a cricket slave's complex story. London: Eva Press. 1997. ISBN 0953121100.
- The Trailblazers: The First English Cricket Tour of Australia: 1861–62. Childrey: Boundary Books. 1999. ISBN 0952207095.
- Silence of the Heart: Cricket Suicides. foreword by Mike Brearley. Edinburgh: Mainstream. 2001. ISBN 1-84018-406-X.
  - 2011: Random House, ISBN 1780573936
- Bodyline Autopsy: The Full Story of the Most Sensational Test Cricket Series – England v Australia 1932– 3. London: Aurum Press. 2002. ISBN 1854108964.
- The Ross Gregory Story. Melbourne: Lothian Books. 2003. ISBN 0734405987.
- Battle for The Ashes. London: Ebury Press. 2005. ISBN 0091910846.
- The Battle Renewed: The Ashes Regained 2006–2007. Sydney: Australian Broadcasting Corporation. 2007. ISBN 978-0733320828.
- Inside Story: Unlocking Australian Cricket's Archives (with Gideon Haigh). Sydney: News Custom Publishing. 2007. ISBN 978-1921116001.
- The David Frith Archive: A Detailed Catalogue of the Cricket Library and Memorabilia Collection of David Frith (Limited ed. of 75 copies). Childrey: Boundary Books. 2009.
- Frith on Cricket. Ilkley: Great Northern Books. 2010. ISBN 978-1905080724.
- Cricket's Collectors (Limited ed. of 150 copies). Godalming: Cricket Memorabilia Society. 2012.
- Guildford's Cricket Story: Celebrating 75 Years of the Woodbridge Road County Cricket Festival – and much besides. Guildford: Guildford C.C. 2013.
- Frith's Encounters. Hove: Von Krumm Publishing. 2014. ISBN 978-0956732125.
- 'Stoddy': England's Finest Sportsman. Hove: Von Krumm Publishing. 2015. ISBN 978-0-9567321-3-2.
- Archie Jackson : cricket's tragic genius. Melbourne: Slattery Media Group. 2020.
- Paddington Boy. Amstelveen: CricketMASH. 2022. ISBN 978-9492203052.
