= Gerry Tordoff =

English cricketer (1929–2008)

- Tordoff pictured in 1952

Personal information
- Full name: George Gerald Tordoff
- Born: 6 December 1929; Whitwood, Yorkshire, England
- Died: 16 January 2008 (aged 78); Poulton-le-Fylde, Lancashire, England
- Batting: Left-handed
- Bowling: Right-arm medium
- Role: Batsman

Domestic team information
- Years: Team
- 1950–1955: Somerset
- 1952: Cambridge University
- 1962: Combined Services
- FC debut: 19 July 1950 Somerset v Warwickshire
- Last FC: 26 June 1962 Combined Services v Ireland

Career statistics
Competition	First-class
Matches	85
Runs scored	3,975
Batting average	27.99
100s/50s	5/20
Top score	156*
Balls bowled	3,752
Wickets	40
Bowling average	48.97
5 wickets in innings	0
10 wickets in match	0
Best bowling	4/43
Catches/stumpings	47/–
- Source: CricketArchive, 21 June 2008

George Gerald "Gerry" Tordoff (6 December 1929 – 16 January 2008) played first-class cricket for Somerset, Cambridge University and the Combined Services in the 1950s and early 1960s.

A left-handed batsman who could open the innings or bat in middle order and a right-arm medium-pace change bowler, Tordoff had two seasons of virtually full-time cricket in 1952 and 1955, but was otherwise restricted by his career in the Royal Navy to occasional matches. He was given leave of absence by the Navy to captain Somerset in the 1955 season, but when the season was over, he resigned the captaincy and never appeared again for the county side.

Tordoff was born at Whitwood, Yorkshire and died at Poulton-le-Fylde, Lancashire.

== Early career ==
Tordoff played a couple of matches for Somerset in 1950 without making much impact, but in his first game of 1951, his third in all cricket, he hit an unbeaten 87 against Nottinghamshire at Trent Bridge. Later in the season he hit 55 against Surrey in a rain-ruined match at Taunton.

== Cambridge, Somerset and the Navy ==
Having been at Manchester University, he went to Cambridge for the 1951–52 academic year and won a blue for association football, playing at left-half. In the 1952 cricket season, he played regularly for the Cambridge side, winning a blue alongside a galaxy of Test stars — Peter May, David Sheppard, John Warr and Cuan McCarthy had already appeared in Tests, Raman Subba Row, Gerry Alexander, Robin Marlar and Dennis Silk, who played only one match, later became prominent players. Tordoff scored 435 runs at an average of 29 in the university season, with a highest score of 81 in the match against Middlesex at Fenner's.

Once the university term was over, Tordoff played for Somerset regularly for the remainder of the 1952 season and finished second in the county's batting averages, with 636 runs at an average of 33.47. He scored his maiden first-class century with 101 not out in the match against Hampshire at Taunton. He finished the season with 1071 runs at an average of 31.50. Having bowled only seven overs for Cambridge without taking a wicket, his bowling was more in demand for a Somerset side whose weakness in every variety of bowling except spin consigned them to the bottom of the County Championship. In several matches he opened the bowling and in Harold Gimblett's benefit match against Northamptonshire at Glastonbury he took four for 43 in 22 overs, the first four wickets of the innings, and these remained his best-ever bowling figures. But his total of 11 wickets for the county that season came at a cost of 48.27 runs each.

At the end of the 1952 cricket season, Tordoff took a three-year commission as an officer in the Royal Navy. This curtailed his appearances in first-class cricket over the next two seasons. In 1953 he played five times for Somerset and three times for the Combined Services, but failed to exceed 50 in any innings. The following season there were four Somerset games and two for Combined Services, and these matches produced 512 runs at an average of 51.20 with two centuries – a not-out innings of 156 for Combined Services against the Pakistan touring side at Catterick, which remained the highest of Tordoff's first-class career, and 110 for Somerset against Kent at Maidstone.

== Somerset captain ==
Somerset finished bottom of the County Championship in both 1953 and 1954, and the captain, Ben Brocklehurst, later owner and publisher of The Cricketer, resigned. Somerset approached the Navy to allow Tordoff leave of absence to captain the side for the 1955 season.

The move was not a success, Somerset ending up at the bottom yet again, for the fourth consecutive season, despite winning four matches, double the number of each of the previous three seasons. Wisden noted that Tordoff "stood little chance of bringing a transformation in the fortunes of the club". It added: "From the beginning Tordoff found his batting order a jig-saw puzzle without the right men to fit the holes."

The Somerset county historian and journalist David Foot wrote: "He was a personable rather than an astute captain. Some of the committee found him a rather too convenient scapegoat. A former player said: 'It was hard to see who was around to take over from Ben (Brocklehurst). Gerry was a goodish player but he still had a bad side around him. It was terribly unjust that he should have been blamed as much as he was'."

Personally, Tordoff had a mediocre batting season: he scored 1,196 runs, more than in any other season in his career, but his average of 22.56 runs per innings was low. He scored just one century, an unbeaten 145 in the match against Gloucestershire at Taunton, but he achieved his only representative cricket, being selected for the Gentlemen in the annual Gentlemen v Players match at Lord's, where he made 20 and 44.

At the end of the 1955 season, Tordoff resigned from the captaincy, to be replaced by Somerset's first professional captain, Maurice Tremlett. Tordoff returned to the Navy, and never played for Somerset again.

== Later cricket career ==
After 1955, Tordoff's cricket was entirely for the Combined Services first-class side, for whom he played a few matches in most seasons up to 1962. In 1959, he was captain of the Services team when Jack Bannister took all 10 wickets in an innings for 41 runs for Warwickshire at the Mitchells and Butlers ground in Birmingham. And in 1961 he scored 131, his fifth and final first-class century, in the match against Nottinghamshire at Trent Bridge. After his last first-class appearance in 1962, he played Minor Counties cricket for Berkshire. A former pupil of Normanton Grammar School, he captained the Royal Navy side which played London University in 1969. The university side was captained by John Law, a former student of the same school.

Sporting positions
Preceded by Ben Brocklehurst	Somerset County Cricket Captain; 1955	Succeeded by Maurice Tremlett
