= Ben Brocklehurst =

English cricketer and publisher

Personal information
- Full name: Benjamin Gilbert Brocklehurst
- Born: 18 February 1922; Knapton, Norfolk, England
- Died: 16 June 2007 (aged 85); Tunbridge Wells, Kent, England
- Batting: Right-handed
- Role: Batsman

Domestic team information
- Years: Team
- 1952–1954: Somerset
- First-class debut: 3 May 1952 Somerset v Yorkshire
- Last First-class: 28 August 1954 Somerset v Hampshire

Career statistics
Competition	First-class
Matches	64
Runs scored	1671
Batting average	15.61
100s/50s	0/6
Top score	89
Balls bowled	27
Wickets	1
Bowling average	36.00
5 wickets in innings	0
10 wickets in match	0
Best bowling	1/3
Catches/stumpings	26/–
- Source: Cricinfo, 4 October 2009

Benjamin Gilbert Brocklehurst (18 February 1922 – 17 June 2007) was an English first-class cricketer and publisher.

== Biography ==
Brocklehurst was born at Knapton Hall, in Knapton, Norfolk. His father was a Canadian rancher. He was educated at Bradfield College, where he played football, tennis, squash and athletics for the school, and was captain of cricket. He was Victor Ludorum at the public school sports event held at White City in 1938, winning the discus and the high jump. During the Second World War, he served initially in the 10th (Home Defence) Battalion of The Devonshire Regiment, spending time on coastal defences in East Anglia. He was wounded by shrapnel during the Bristol Blitz, and was commissioned as an officer in The Royal Berkshire Regiment before transferring to the Indian Army. He joined the Frontier Force Rifles, posted to Wana on the North West Frontier. He was attacked by a bear in Kashmir, and then volunteered for service in Burma, where he commanded a Pashtun company in the 4th Battalion of the 12th Frontier Force Regiment in 17th Division, a reconnaissance unit. He was mentioned in dispatches and promoted to acting lieutenant colonel, taking charge of thousands of Japanese prisoners.

He returned to England and became a farmer in Berkshire for eight years. A right-handed batsman, he represented Somerset County Cricket Club in 64 first-class matches between 1952 and 1954. He captained Somerset in 1953 and 1954, and he was one of the last amateur captains in county cricket. His captaincy did not change the fortunes of the side: they came bottom in the County Championship in the year before he was appointed, and remained bottom in both of his years in charge, losing 37 of the 56 games they played under his leadership. He was also relatively unsuccessful on a personal level, scoring 1,671 runs in 116 innings in first-class cricket, at a batting average of 15.61. Nevertheless, he also played cricket for a number of clubs, including the Marylebone Cricket Club (MCC), I Zingari, Free Foresters, Hampshire Hogs and Bradfield Waifs.

After farming, he turned to publishing, first working on Country Life. He joined the publishing company Mercury House, and persuaded his employer to buy the loss-making cricket magazine The Cricketer. He bought the magazine from his employer in 1972 and left to run it with his wife Belinda. He merged the magazine with Playfair Cricket Monthly in 1973, and it thrived under his ownership. Under the stewardship of his youngest son Tim, The Cricketer went online in 1996 and formed a partnership with Cricinfo in 1997. It was bought by Sir Paul Getty in 2003 and amalgamated with Wisden Cricket Monthly to form The Wisden Cricketer.

He was involved with the establishment of The Cricketer Cup in 1967, an annual competition contested by the "old boys" of public schools, and the National Village Knockout competition in 1972. He also had the idea to stage a Cricket World Cup years before the first such event was staged. His approach to the Marylebone Cricket Club about it, in 1974, did not progress because it was "too commercial". He also sat on the council of the Lord's Taverners. He was also an amateur artist.

He married twice, first to Mary Wynn in 1947; they had a son and a daughter. He married Belinda Bristowe in 1962; they had two sons. He was survived by his second wife, and three sons and a daughter. His daughter Charmaine married the cricketer Richard Hutton, son of Sir Len Hutton. Their sons, Ben and Ollie have both played first-class cricket; Ben was the captain of Middlesex in 2005 and 2006. He died in Tunbridge Wells.

Sporting positions
Preceded by Stuart Rogers	Somerset County Cricket Captain; 1953–1954	Succeeded by Gerry Tordoff
