= Reymond de Montmorency =

English cricketer, golfer, and rackets player

Personal information
- Full name: Reymond Hervey de Montmorency
- Born: 6 October 1871; Gonda, Awadh, British India
- Died: 19 December 1938 (aged 67); Sunningdale, Berkshire, England
- Batting: Right-handed
- Bowling: Right-arm leg break; Right-arm slow-medium
- Relatives: Jim Swanton (son-in-law)

Domestic team information
- Years: Team
- 1897: Oxford University Past and Present
- 1898–1899: Hertfordshire
- 1899: Oxford University
- 1907–1909: Buckinghamshire

Career statistics
| Competition | First-class |
|---|---|
| Matches | 4 |
| Runs scored | 230 |
| Batting average | 32.85 |
| 100s/50s | 0/1 |
| Top score | 62 |
| Balls bowled | 315 |
| Wickets | 5 |
| Bowling average | 24.60 |
| 5 wickets in innings | 0 |
| 10 wickets in match | 0 |
| Best bowling | 3/16 |
| Catches/stumpings | 1/– |
- Source: Cricinfo, 21 June 2011

Reymond Hervey de Montmorency (6 October 1871 – 19 December 1938) was an English golfer, cricketer and rackets player.

== Personal life ==
Born in Gonda, in India, de Montmorency was the son of Major Reymond Hervey de Montmorency and Marion Ellen Coles. He was educated at Cheltenham College, and St Paul's School, London. He worked for the Foreign Office and became a private school master before attending Keble College, Oxford, in January 1896, aged 24. He left Oxford with a Master of Arts. After leaving Oxford he was briefly at Malvern College before becoming a modern language master at Eton College from 1900 to 1927. He married Gwynedd Maud Thomas on 26 April 1905, with the couple having three children, Kathleen in 1906, Ann in 1911 and Reymond in 1916. He died at Sunningdale, Berkshire, on 19 December 1938. His daughter Ann married cricket writer Jim Swanton while Reymond junior served in World War II with the Royal Air Force, and was killed in action in 1940.

== Cricket career ==
De Montmorency was a right-handed batsman who bowled both leg breaks and right-arm slow-medium. He made his first-class debut playing for Oxford University Past and Present, a team composed of then current and former students, against the Gentlemen of Philadelphia in 1897. De Montmorency batted once in the match, scoring 31 runs before being dismissed by Percy Clark.

De Montmorency made his debut for Hertfordshire in the 1898 Minor Counties Championship against Cambridgeshire, which was his only appearance for the county that season, while the following season he once more made a single appearance for Hertfordshire, against Buckinghamshire. It was in 1899 that he played his first first-class match for Oxford University Cricket Club, which came against Surrey. He played two further first-class matches for the University in 1899, against the Marylebone Cricket Club and Cambridge University. It was in the match against Cambridge University that he scored his only first-class half century, making 62 runs.

He made his debut for Buckinghamshire in the 1907 Minor Counties Championship against Wiltshire. He appeared once more in 1907 against Berkshire, before appearing a final time in 1909 against Wiltshire.

== Golf career ==
De Montmorency was a noted amateur golfer. He got his blue at Oxford in 1897, 1898 and 1899, being captain in 1898. He played for England in the 1908 England–Scotland Amateur Match and for the Amateurs in the 1911 Coronation Match and also represented the British team against the Americans at Hoylake in 1921, the match which led to the founding of the Walker Cup the following year.

De Montmorency's commitments at Eton restricted his playing opportunities and he did not play in the Amateur Championship until 1927, when he was 55 years old. He also made his only appearance in the Open Championship in 1927 and captained a team of four amateurs that played in South Africa in 1927/28.

== Rackets career ==
De Montmorency got his blue in the doubles at rackets at Oxford in 1897 and 1899, playing with Harry Foster in 1897.
