= Restroom attendant =

Cleaner for a public toilet

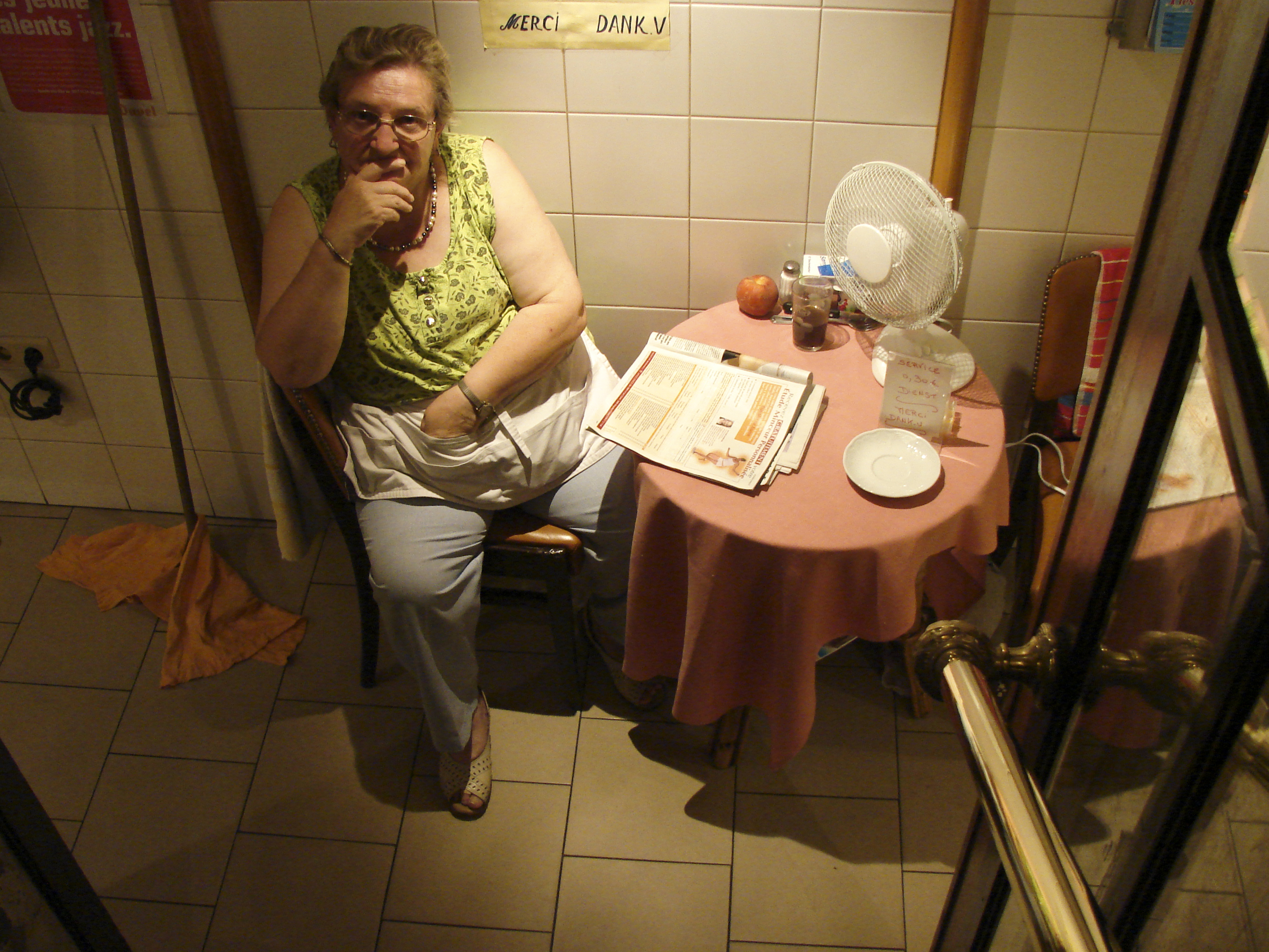
A bathroom attendant in Belgium

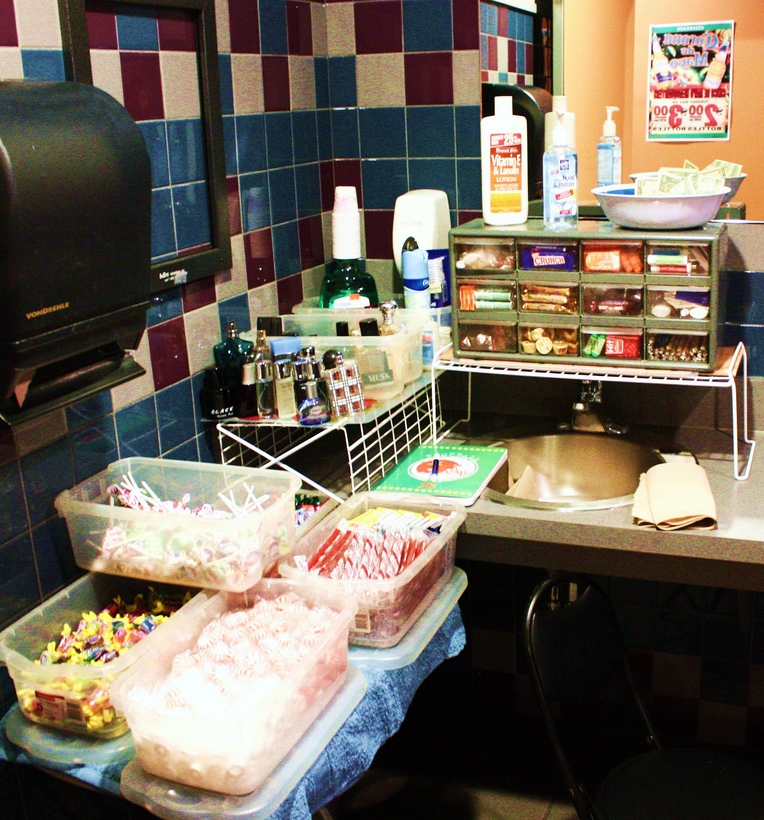
A bathroom attendant's work station

A restroom attendant, also called bathroom attendant, lavatory attendant, toilet attendant, or washroom attendant, is a cleaner for a public toilet. They maintain and clean the facilities, ensuring that toilet paper, soap, paper towels, and other necessary items are kept stocked. If there is a fee to use the restroom, it is collected by the attendant if there is no coin-operated turnstile or door.

Some restroom attendants also provide services to the patrons, and keep good order by preventing drug-taking and fights.

== Toilet attendants as service providers ==
The attendant may turn on the tap and provide soap and towels. At the attendant's work station, an assortment of items may be available for purchase or for free such as mints, perfume or cologne, mouthwash, chewing gum, cigarettes, pain relievers, condoms, and energy drinks. Many attendants keep a tip jar at their work stations for patrons to leave tips for either the attendant's services, such as handing patrons hand-towels, or for taking or using any of the aforementioned items from the work station. Many times attendants are expected to invest in the items offered at their workstations in order to profit through earning tips. Some attendants make their living exclusively from tips they earn while some receive a base hourly wage in addition to the tip. Although toilet attendants' working life has hardly been researched, the scarce evidence suggests that their work can be defined as a 'bad job'. In North America, they are typically found at restaurants, night clubs, or bars.

== Notable people ==
Victoria Hughes (née Rogers, 22 June 1897 – 30 August 1978), was a British lavatory attendant, and the first of her profession to have an entry in the Oxford Dictionary of National Biography, having published her memoirs Ladies' Mile at the age of 80, which some found shocking but have since become a valuable local history resource.
