= Geoffrey Howard (cricketer) =

English cricketer and cricket administrator

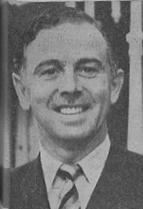
- Born: 14 February 1909; Hampstead Garden Suburb
- Died: 8 November 2002 (aged 93); Minchinhampton
- Occupations: cricketer cricket administrator
- Relatives: Ebenezer Howard (grandfather)

Cecil Geoffrey Howard (14 February 1909 – 8 November 2002) was an English cricketer and cricket administrator.

== Early life ==
Geoffrey Howard was born in Hampstead Garden Suburb, a grandson of Sir Ebenezer Howard, a founder of the Garden City Movement, who taught him a respect for people and a love for cricket. He was educated at the University College School. He is related to the dancer and television actress Una Stubbs, his niece, and her son the television and film score composer Christian Henson.

== Career ==
As a right-handed batsman and a wicket-keeper, he represented Middlesex in three first-class matches in 1930, whilst on annual leave from the bank for which he worked. He played for the Private Banks XI from 1926 to 1936 and for the RAF during the Second World War, when he once made a century before lunch.

Howard was an enlightened administrator and a popular tour manager. He was Secretary of Lancashire (1949 to 1965) and Surrey (1965 to 1975) and managed three Marylebone Cricket Club (MCC) touring teams in Australia and the Indian sub-continent. The English cricket team in Australia in 1954–55 of Australia was the focal point of his rich and varied life, with England winning a series in Australia for the first time since Bodyline in 1932–33. The English cricket team in Pakistan in 1955–56 was marred by an incident, when several of the England cricketers doused the umpire Idris Baig with a bucket of water and as a result a major controversy broke out. The background included Baig telling Howard, "You must understand ... that a lot of the crowd come to watch me umpire", and that same day reportedly giving three dubious LBWs against England, and turning down a certain one of their own. It took a sincere apology by MCC president, Field Marshal Alexander of Tunis to his former military colleague and counterpart at the Pakistani board, Iskander Mirza, to prevent the tour being called off.

Howard stayed active in retirement and was President of Surrey in 1989. He collaborated with the author Stephen Chalke on the award-winning book At the Heart of English Cricket in 2001, which won the Cricket Society Jubilee Prize in 2002. He died in Minchinhampton, aged 93.
