= Simon Lister =

British sportswriter

Simon Lister (born London, 1969) is an English author.

His first book, Supercat, the authorised biography of the former West Indies cricket captain, Clive Lloyd, was published by Stephen Chalke in 2007. The book was shortlisted for the 2008 British Sports Book Awards, and the Guardian cricket correspondent Mike Selvey chose it as his Book of the Year. His 2015 book Fire in Babylon, about the successful West Indian cricket teams from the 1970s to the 1990s, won The Cricket Society/ MCC Book of the Year in 2016.

Lister is also a regular contributor to The Wisden Cricketer magazine and has written for the Wisden Cricketers' Almanack.
