= Sonny Avery =

English cricketer

Personal information
- Full name: Alfred Victor Avery
- Born: 19 December 1914; New Beckton, Essex, England
- Died: 12 May 1997 (aged 82); Monmouth, Wales
- Batting: Right-handed
- Role: Batsman

Domestic team information
- Years: Team
- 1935–1954: Essex

Career statistics
Competition	FC
Matches	269
Runs scored	14,137
Batting average	33.65
100s/50s	25/66
Top score	224
Balls bowled	1,279
Wickets	9
Bowling average	69.66
5 wickets in innings	0
10 wickets in match	0
Best bowling	1/11
Catches/stumpings	119/–
- Source: Cricinfo, 6 November 2013

Alfred Victor "Sonny" Avery (19 December 1914 – 12 May 1997) was an English cricketer. He played for Essex between 1935 and 1954.

Sonny Avery was a right-handed opening batsman, "a good player of in-swing and a powerful cutter who held the bat low down and often suffered injured hands as a result". He and Dickie Dodds formed a strong opening partnership for Essex in the seasons after the Second World War. He played in a Test trial match in 1946 when England were looking for new players, top-scoring with 79 in the first innings of the Rest of England team, but was never selected for the national team.

A few days before the Test trial he had scored 210 for Essex against Surrey at The Oval. Surrey had been dismissed for 162 on the first afternoon, and by stumps Essex were 235 for no wicket, Avery on 140 not out. Essex went on to win by an innings.

Avery made 1000 runs in a season seven times. His 25 centuries included four double-centuries, with a highest score of 224 against Northamptonshire in 1952.

After his playing career ended, Avery coached Gloucestershire and at Monmouth School.
