= Harry Pearson (journalist) =

English sports writer

Harry Pearson (born 1961) is an English journalist and author, specialising in sport.

Pearson has twice won The Cricket Society/MCC Book of the Year award: in 2011 for Slipless in Settle and in 2018 for Connie: The Marvellous Life of Learie Constantine. Reviewing Slipless in Settle in Wisden, Gideon Haigh referred to Pearson as "an extremely funny writer who turns a phrase like a doosra". Writing in Wisden on Pearson's biography of Learie Constantine, Kamila Shamsie praised his ability to retell "Constantine's actions on the cricket field, with crackle and fizz ... His descriptions of Connie's fielding heroics are a particular delight".

Pearson has been a regular contributor to the monthly football magazine When Saturday Comes for 20 years and has also written a weekly column for The Guardian.

== Books ==
- The Far Corner: A Mazy Dribble through North-East Football (1994)
- North Country Fair: Travels among Racing Pigs and Giant Marrows (1996)
- A Tall Man in a Low Land: Some Time among the Belgians (1998)
- Around the World by Mouse (2005)
- Achtung Schweinehund!: A Boy's Own Story of Imaginary Combat (2007)
- Dribble!: The Unbelievable Football Encyclopaedia (2007)
- Hound Dog Days: One Dog and His Man: A Story of North Country Life and Canine Contentment (2008)
- Slipless in Settle: A Slow Turn around Northern Cricket (2010)
- Conkers for Goalposts (2010; compiler)
- Housekeepers, Shortlegs and Flemish String: Three Village Sports Clubs in Northumberland (2012)
- The Trundlers: The Military Medium-Paced Story of Cricket's Most Invaluable Breed (2013)
- Connie: The Marvellous Life of Learie Constantine (2017)
- The Beast, the Emperor and the Milkman: A Bone-shaking Tour through Cycling's Flemish Heartlands (2019)
- The Farther Corner: A Sentimental Return to North-East Football (2020)
- First of the Summer Wine (2022)
- No Pie, No Priest: A Journey through the Folk Sports of Britain (2023)
