= The Best Loved Game =

1978 book by Geoffrey Moorhouse

- First edition (publ. Hodder & Stoughton
- Author: Geoffrey Moorhouse
- Language: English
- Genre: Non fiction
- Set in: United Kingdom
- Publisher: Bloomsbury (UK)
- Publication place: United Kingdom

The Best Loved Game is a book written by Geoffrey Moorhouse. Written during the summer of 1978, and published the following year, the book describes the 1978 English cricket season through a series of essays based around matches Moorhouse attended. Each chapter features a specific match. Moorhouse attended a range of games from school and village level to Test matches, thus covering both amateur and professional cricket. The book therefore describes different types of cricket and the different levels at which it is played, providing a picture of its place in English society at that time. The descriptions are also set against the backdrop of the Packer Crisis, which was affecting cricket at that time, with a number of professionals joining the so-called 'Packer Circus', an unofficial series of matches funded by Australian tycoon Kerry Packer. This resulted in a number of senior players being banned from international cricket, and lengthy court cases to resolve the resulting disputes.

== Theme ==
The book contains description of 14 fixtures of various kinds. The writer starts the book at Lord's, the Mecca of cricket, with the traditional three-day fixture between the MCC and the County champions of the previous season (in this case, Middlesex). He visits Lord's three more times during the course of the season (in June for the Test Match against Pakistan, in July, for the oldest fixture, between Eton and Harrow School, and finally in early September for the Gillette Cup final). He also goes to grounds around the country, including Oxfordshire to cover a village championship game and Lichfield for a minor county game.

== Awards ==
The Best Loved Game was awarded the Cricket Book of the Year award by The Cricket Society in 1979. In May 2019, it was longlisted by Wisden Cricket Monthly in an article on the best cricket books of all time.

== Influence ==
The Best Loved Game was the inspiration for Still the Best Loved Game?, by Neil Cole, published in 2019, forty years after the publication of the original. Still the Best Loved Game? follows a similar format, with observations on cricket drawn from matches throughout an English summer, but takes a much more inclusive approach befitting the 21st century (featuring women's, as well as men's, cricket; disability cricket; MCC Schools v the English Schools Cricket Association, which includes state school players, rather than Eton v Harrow; and a Loughborough v Durham university match rather than Oxford v Cambridge).
