= Andy Afford =

English cricketer

Personal information
- Full name: John Andrew Afford
- Born: 12 May 1964 (age 62); Crowland, Lincolnshire
- Batting: Right-handed
- Bowling: Slow left-arm orthodox

Career statistics
| Competition | First-class | List A |
|---|---|---|
| Matches | 170 | 52 |
| Runs scored | 398 | 6 |
| Batting average | 4.18 | 2 |
| 100s/50s | 0/0 | 0/0 |
| Top score | 22* | 2* |
| Balls bowled | 33,757 | 2,800 |
| Wickets | 468 | 48 |
| Bowling average | 32.98 | 37.33 |
| 5 wickets in innings | 16 | 0 |
| 10 wickets in match | 2 | 0 |
| Best bowling | 6/51 | 4/38 |
| Catches/stumpings | 57/– | 10/– |
- Source: , 2 June 2022

John Andrew Afford (born 12 May 1964) is a former English first-class cricketer. He was a right-handed batsman and a left-arm slow bowler who played for Nottinghamshire. He is now a businessman.

Afford made his first-class debut for Nottinghamshire against Oxford University, during the 1984 season, appearing in single game during the 1984 County Championship season, but it wasn't until two years later that he would get a regular first-team place, playing just two County Championship games during the 1985 season. He played in the Second XI Championship in 1987 and 1988 and returned to play several matches for the first team in 1989.

Afford started the following season promisingly, making the selection for an England A fixture against Zimbabwe in 1990 which the team won by nine wickets. He finished the year being awarded his cap.

In 1991 the team's Second XI flourished, winning the Second XI Trophy with Afford putting in a strong bowling performance along the way to Nottinghamshire's top placing in the North Zone, and taking the wicket of Ali Brown in the final. Afford was now regularly partnered by former England Test spinner Eddie Hemmings.

Afford took 468 first-class wickets, including hauls of 10 wickets in a match on two occasions, and five-wicket hauls on sixteen occasions, with his best haul of 6-51 coming against Lancashire. The two ten-wicket innings came against Kent and Sussex.

Afford was editor of All Out Cricket between 2002 and 2011, nominated as one of the British Society of Magazine Editors (BSME) sports editors of the year in 2011 and worked as publishing director of The Cricketer magazine.

In 2016, Afford co-founded Nottingham-based creative agency STENCIL with Sam Bowles. He is currently managing director and leads on projects in sport, music and food & drink.
