= Elizabeth Ammon =

British cricket journalist

- Occupation: Sports journalist
- Known for: Regional cricket

Elizabeth Ammon is a London-based cricket journalist and broadcaster.

== Professional life ==
Ammon has written for The Guardian, The Independent, The Daily Mirror and The Times as well as for websites such as Sporting Intelligence and ESPN and magazines such as The Cricket Monthly and Wisden Cricket Monthly.

Ammon has appeared on the Sky Sports programme Cricket Writers on TV. She has appeared as a pundit on the Talksport programme Cricket Week, the Lord's podcast, and Off The Ball. She has worked as a county cricket commentator for BBC Sport, as well as appearing on Test Match Special and BBC Radio 5 Live.
