= Bomber Wells =

English cricketer

Personal information
- Full name: Bryan Douglas Wells
- Born: 27 July 1930; Gloucester, England
- Died: 19 June 2008 (aged 77); Gloucester
- Nickname: Bomber
- Batting: Right-handed
- Bowling: Right-arm off spin

Domestic team information
- Years: Team
- 1951–1959: Gloucestershire
- 1960–1965: Nottinghamshire

Career statistics
Competition	First-class
Matches	301
Runs scored	2,413
Batting average	7.47
100s/50s	0/1
Top score	55
Balls bowled	67,464
Wickets	998
Bowling average	24.26
5 wickets in innings	46
10 wickets in match	7
Best bowling	8/31
Catches/stumpings	112/–
- Source: CricketArchive, 6 April 2011

Bryan Douglas "Bomber" Wells (27 July 1930 – 19 June 2008) was an English cricketer.

Wells was born and raised in Gloucester, and educated at local school Linden Road Secondary. He was a right-handed tail-end batsman and off-break bowler who played in 302 first-class matches between 1951 and 1965, for Gloucestershire and Nottinghamshire. Wells took 998 wickets in first-class matches at an average of 24.26.

== Playing career ==
Wells was known as "Bomber" after the former British heavyweight boxer "Bombardier" Billy Wells who struck the gong at the start of films made by the Rank studios.

Wells was unable to retain a place in his native County side through the emergence of David Allen who was a far superior batsman. Wells had taken 122 and 123 wickets in 1955 and 1956 respectively but had a moderate season in 1957 and was not able to displace Allen or John Mortimore thereafter. Joining Nottinghamshire, the weakest county team at that time, Wells claimed 120 wickets in his first season, bowling over 1200 overs. He retired after the 1965 season. A poor bat, Wells scored 25% of his runs in sixes. His career batting average was 7.47.

He was a participant in a famous scene in a county match, widely repeated for decades. As described by The Guardian in 2011:

...there's no chance of a recurrence of one of the game's greatest ever scenes, which starred, as so many do, Gloucestershire's incorrigible spinner Bryan "Bomber" Wells. A poor judge of a run, he once found himself batting with a runner and a partner who also had need of one. Playing a push into the offside, he called for a single, forgot he had a runner and set off himself, as did the two men at the other end. "No" followed "Yes" and all four found themselves at the same end. A fielder dislodged the bails at the other end and the umpire, Alec Skelding, professed himself to be as confused as the four batsmen. "One of you buggers is out," he said. "I don't know which. You decide and inform the bloody scorers!"

Wells claimed to have bowled the fastest over in cricket, during the time it took for the bells of Worcester Cathedral to strike 12 o'clock. The bells have since been timed at approximately 34 seconds.

A noted raconteur, he published a book of tales called Well, Well Wells in 1982. Included in the book are many of his after dinner stories. He describes how on his very first match for Gloucestershire he had to borrow kit in order to play and travelled to the game on the bus. He was known to dislike physical exercise and so developed a run-up of just one or two paces. It took some time for batsman to get used to this unusual style: "I took five wickets in my first match. And I know at least two of them weren't looking," he told audiences.

Although he took 998 wickets in first-class cricket he declined the opportunity to play in the last game of his final first-class season in 1965. He thought he had 999 wickets. "Lots of people have taken 1000 wickets, he told the Notts captain. Nobody has taken 999."

== Retirement ==
In 1998, Wells suffered a major stroke which required him to use a wheelchair full-time. He died on 19 June 2008.

== Sources ==
- Chalke, Stephen; Wells, Bryan (2000). "One More Run". Talking with Bryan 'Bomber' Wells. ISBN 0-9531196-2-9.
