= Dickie Dodds =

English cricketer

Personal information
- Full name: Thomas Carter Dodds
- Born: 29 May 1919; Bedford, Bedfordshire, England
- Died: 17 September 2001 (aged 82); Cambridge, Cambridgeshire, England
- Nickname: Dickie
- Batting: Right-handed
- Bowling: Leg-break; Right-arm medium
- Role: Opening batsman

Domestic team information
- Years: Team
- 1946–1959: Essex
- FC debut: 11 February 1944 Services XI v Indian XI
- Last FC: 16 June 1961 MCC v Scotland

Career statistics
Competition	First-class
Matches	396
Runs scored	19,407
Batting average	28.75
100s/50s	17/114
Top score	157
Balls bowled	1,800
Wickets	36
Bowling average	31.27
5 wickets in innings	0
10 wickets in match	0
Best bowling	4/34
Catches/stumpings	186/–
- Source: CricketArchive, 21 January 2013

Thomas Carter Dodds, known in his cricket career as Dickie Dodds and outside it as Carter Dodds, (29 May 1919 – 17 September 2001) was an English first-class cricketer who played for Essex between 1946 and 1959 as a hard-hitting opening batsman. He was born in Bedford, Bedfordshire and died in Cambridge.

The son of a clergyman, Dodds was a strong supporter of the Moral Re-Armament movement and cricket was, in his view, "a reflection of the Great Creator" and should therefore be played in a suitably dashing and creative style.

== Early life and career ==
Dodds was one of four brothers, the sons of a Church of England vicar who was successively in charge of parishes in Bedfordshire, Northamptonshire and Warwickshire. He was educated at Wellingborough School and at Warwick School, and then joined Barclays Bank, moving to London. He played second eleven cricket for both Warwickshire and Middlesex, but he did not play any first-class games, nor in any official Minor Counties fixtures and at this stage he played as a lower-order batsman and leg-spin bowler.

Dodds joined the Royal Signals Regiment at the outbreak of World War II and was later commissioned, serving in India and Burma and finishing the war as a captain. His first experience of first-class cricket came during his war service: he played for a Services XI captained by Douglas Jardine against a strong Indian XI at Bombay in February 1944, the only debutant in a strong team of Test and county players.

== Cricket and Christianity ==
Having been introduced earlier to the Essex county cricket captain Tom Pearce, Dodds was demobbed from the army in 1946 and joined Essex. At about this time, according to his later account in his autobiography, he joined Moral Re-Armament and embraced a form of active Christianity in which he lived his life according to "advice" which he received in conversations with God: "You have a quiet time, in which you put the problem to him, and you note what thoughts he puts into your mind in reply. You are not asking for anything, except advice."

Dodds reported that he asked God how he should play cricket, and received the reply: "Hit the ball hard and enjoy it." He took some while to follow this advice, but when he did, the Essex cricketer and coach Frank Rist noted such a transformation in his batting that he dubbed Dodds "the miracle man". Dodds himself dated his transformation to a match against Middlesex: "I felt closer to God than ever before in my life," he wrote. "I tried to fashion the loveliest strokes I could manage for the God who would enjoy them. In return I had a tremendous sense of His pleasure."

Later, according to his own account, Dodds followed the same precept of asking for God's advice on other matters. He was "advised" not to insure against rain in his benefit match, which proved a wise decision. In a match at Ilford, he conceived that if he were to take a catch off a particular ball bowled by leg-spinner Bill Greensmith, he should marry a woman named Ann who was keener on him than he was on her – Greensmith bowled a long hop, the batsman took a swipe, Dodds held the catch, and married Ann.

When not playing cricket, Dodds worked for Moral Re-Armament in the East End of London, and then further afield. Playing cricket as an amateur in 1946, he turned professional – unusual for a former public schoolboy – from 1947 and he gave the money from his benefit match to Moral Re-Armament projects in India. He worked on projects worldwide for the group after he retired from cricket.

== First-class cricket career ==
Dodds went straight into the Essex first team when he joined the county and made an impact as an opening batsman in his first match, against Sussex at Ilford, when his second innings of 63 was by some distance the highest score in a final innings which saw Essex lose nine wickets but hang on for a draw. A little over a month later, Dodds and Sonny Avery set an Essex first-wicket partnership record with a stand of 270 in the match against Surrey at The Oval; at this stage, Dodds was not yet following his "instruction" to hit the ball hard, and Avery comfortably outscored him, making 140 out of 235 on the first day – Dodds was 83 not out at close of play. He went on the following morning to his first first-class century, finishing with 103. Later in the season he improved on that with a second century, a score of 111, in the match against Hampshire at Westcliff, and he finished the season with 1050 runs at an average of 25.60.

The 1947 and 1948 seasons were Dodds' most prolific in first-class cricket and contained his highest aggregates of runs, highest batting averages and his two highest scores. In May 1947 he was picked for the Marylebone Cricket Club (MCC) team to play the touring South African team and scored 80 and 25, sharing in a first-innings first-wicket partnership of 121 with Dennis Brookes which accounted for more than half of the MCC total. Less than two weeks later, he made 157, which remained his highest ever individual score, in the match against Leicestershire at Leicester. And when the first-class averages were published early in June, Dodds stood fourth in the national batting lists with 816 runs at an average of 51 runs per innings, headed only by the Test players Martin Donnelly, Denis Compton and Len Hutton. These averages were published while the first Test match against the South Africans was being played: Dodds was not picked for that, nor for any Test cricket. He maintained form to the end of the 1947 season, and his aggregate of 2147 runs at an average of 38.33 was his highest total for a single season. The 1948 season was another success for Dodds: he scored 1876 runs at an average of 39.08, his best season's average, though on both aggregate and average he was outshone by his opening partner, Avery.

Dodds' first-class cricket career never achieved these heights again, and though he continued to contribute more than 1000 runs each season for the next 10 years, his batting average drifted downwards – to the low 30s up to 1952, and then the mid 20s thereafter. His cavalier batting style rarely led to long innings and he never scored more than three centuries in any single season; after 1954, he made only one further century in four-and-a-half years of regular county cricket. He was, according to his obituary in Wisden Cricketers' Almanack in 2002, "like a fiery Viking, smiting and walloping in the Essex cause". In the wet 1958 season his aggregate was just 1075 runs and his average had declined to 21.93; he was, with Dennis Brookes and Jack Robertson, by this stage one of only three cricketers to have achieved 1000 runs in each postwar season. In the 1959 season, the young opening batsman Les Savill enjoyed a highly successful start to the season and Dodds dropped out of the Essex first team in mid-season. After a few second eleven games, he did not regain his place and he retired from regular cricket at the end of the season. He reappeared in single matches for MCC in both 1960 and 1961, in the first of these scoring 75 and 41 against Cambridge University and sharing a fast opening partnership of 100 with Tom Pugh that lasted just an hour.

== After cricket ==
Dodds worked on Moral Re-Armament projects in the UK and overseas, and was also involved with West Indian cricketer Conrad Hunte in race relations work. The cricket writer Neville Cardus suggested that he write his autobiography, and Cardus contributed the foreword to the resulting book, published in 1976 and entitled Hit Hard and Enjoy It; the foreword is thought to be the last work that Cardus did before his death. Dodds later wrote a cricket coaching book, Cricket: From Father to Son, in 1979. The cricket writer and publisher Stephen Chalke has named Hit Hard and Enjoy It as his favourite cricket book, praising especially "the central chapters in which he captures the rhythm of a county cricketer's summer. The writing has a lyrical beauty that enchants me every time I pick up the book."

Dodds' first wife Ann, whom he married in 1960, died in 1978; they had one son. He married Kathleen Johnson in 1985.
