= All Out Cricket =

Cricket magazine

- Cover of All Out Cricket, Issue no. 90
- Editor: Phil Walker
- Categories: Sports magazine
- Frequency: Monthly
- Publisher: All Out Cricket Ltd
- Founder: Matt Thacker
- Founded: 2002
- Final issue: October 2017
- Company: TriNorth Communications
- Country: United Kingdom
- Based in: London
- ISSN: 1743-3134

All Out Cricket was a monthly cricket magazine. Launched in 2002, it was founded by Matt Thacker and was edited by Phil Walker. The magazine had its headquarters in London. It was part of Trinorth Media.

In 2012 John Stern, former editor of The Cricketer, began to serve as editor at large of All Out Cricket.

In October 2017, after 157 issues, the magazine was published for the last time. The following month the team behind All Out Cricket revived Wisden Cricket Monthly magazine.
