= David Rayvern Allen =

Cricket writer and broadcaster

- Born: 5 February 1938
- Died: 9 October 2014 (aged 76)
- Occupations: Cricket writer and historian, radio producer, presenter and speaker

David Leonard Rayvern Allen (5 February 1938 – 9 October 2014) was a cricket writer and historian, as well as a radio producer and presenter, a speaker and a musician. His radio productions won awards including the 1991 Prix Italia for Who Pays the Piper, a collaboration with Richard Stilgoe. He died aged 76 in 2014.

== Life and career ==
Allen was born in Streatham, London, and went to school at Sir Walter St John's School, Battersea. He gained external music diplomas from the Royal Academy of Music and the Guildhall School of Music and Drama in London.

Allen spent his working life as a radio producer with the BBC, working on a wide range of programmes before retiring in 1993. Later, as a member of the MCC's Arts and Library committee, he was largely responsible for the club's Audio Archive Project, a collection of several hundred interviews with cricket people; he conducted more than a hundred of the interviews himself.

He won several awards for his cricket biographies. His Wisden obituary said of them that he was "conscientious, readable, judicious" and that he "did not flinch from the less agreeable aspects of his subjects' characters".

He married Rosemary Clark in 1966. They had two daughters.

== Works ==
=== Radio ===
- King Vidor profile BBC Radio 1978 (presenter)
- Billy Wilder profile BBC Radio 1978 (interviewer)
- Who Could Ask for Anything More? A Celebration of Ira Gershwin BBC Radio 2 1996 (producer)

=== With Richard Stilgoe ===
- Used Notes
- Music on the Brain
- The Singing Wheelchair
- Hamburger Weekend (1984)
- Who Pays the Piper (1991)

=== Cricket-related (partial list) ===
- A Song for Cricket (1981) ISBN 978-0720712872
- The "Punch" Book of Cricket (1985) ISBN 978-0246123848
- Cricket on the Air: A Selection from Fifty Years of Radio Broadcasts (1985) BBC Books ISBN 978-0563203438
- Arlott on Wine (1987) ISBN 978-0006370611 (with John Arlott)
- Peter Pan and Cricket (1988) Constable & Co ISBN 0 09 467630 5
- Sir Aubrey: A Biography of C. Aubrey Smith - England Cricketer, West End Actor, Hollywood Film Star (1st 1982), J. W. McKenzie, (2nd 1987), ISBN 978-0947821197; augmented edition: limited to 150 (2005), 2010: ISBN 0947821198
- The Guinness Book of Cricket Extras (1988) (with Honor Head), Guinness Publishing ISBN 978-0851124858
- Arlott: The Authorised Biography (2004) ISBN 978-1845130022
- Jim: The Life of E. W. Swanton (2004) ISBN 978-1854109002
- The Second Lord's Cricket Ground: Home of MCC, 1811-1813 (2006) MCC
- Songs of Cricket (2011) mentor for this Signum CD by cantabile - the London Quartet with guests Rory Bremner, Tim Rice, Richard Stilgoe, Alex L'Estrange, Eliza Lumley and Chris Hatt

=== Other ===
- Punches on the Page: A Boxing Anthology (1998) ISBN 978-1851589876
- Living with London (2012) Methuen ISBN 978-0413777393 (with Nick Botting)
