= Civil Service Club =

Social club in London, England

Coordinates: 51°30′24″N 0°07′32″W

The Civil Service Club
- Founded: 1953
- Purpose: Social club for members of the UK Civil Service and His Majesty's Diplomatic Service
- Location: 13–15 Great Scotland Yard
- Website: www.civilserviceclub.org.uk

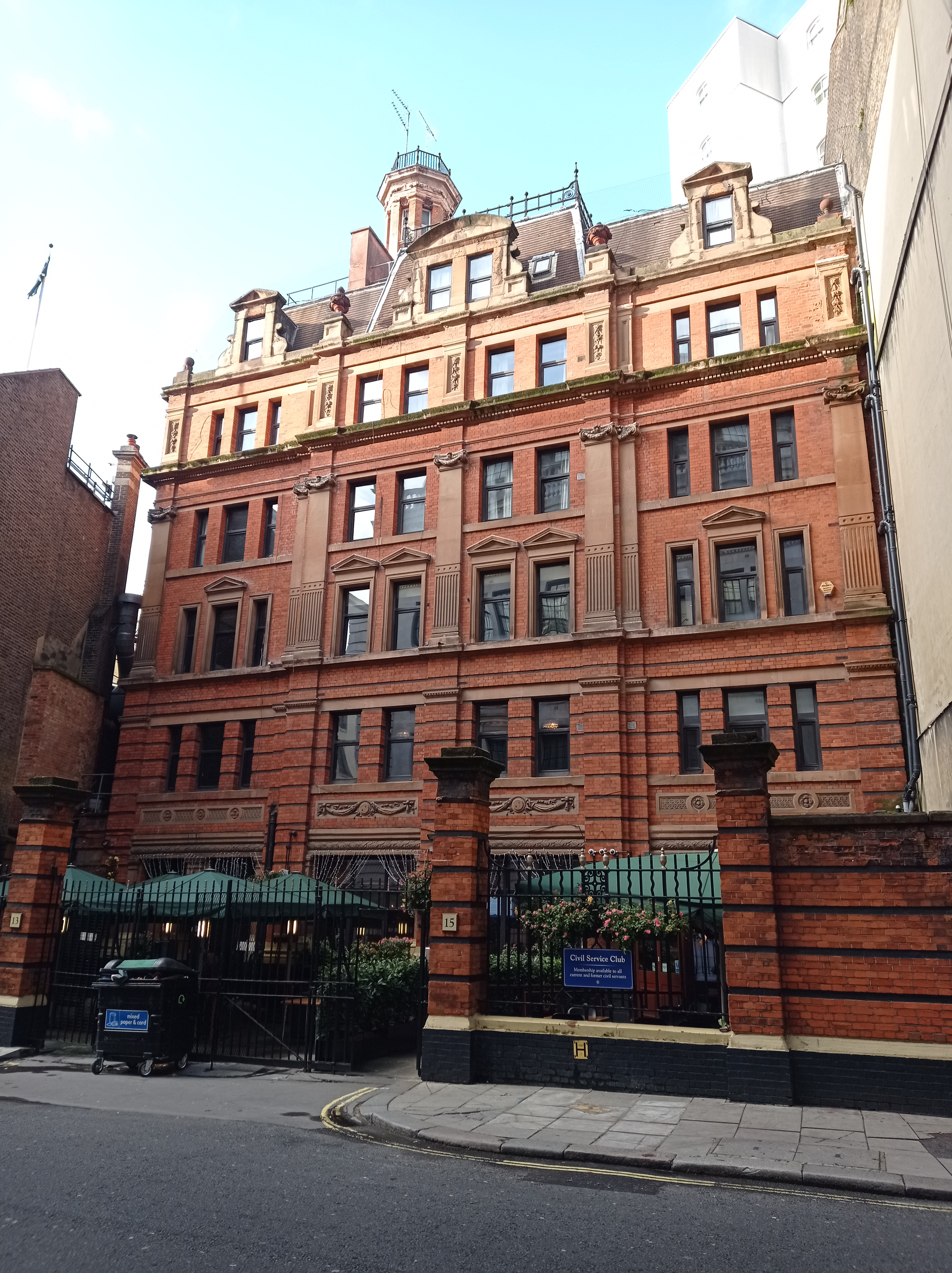
The Civil Service Club

The Civil Service Club is a London social club, founded in 1953, for current and former members of the UK Civil Service and His Majesty's Diplomatic Service.

In advance of the wedding of the Princess Elizabeth and Philip Mountbatten, which took place on 20 November 1947 at Westminster Abbey, the Home Civil Service and Foreign Service undertook a collection for the purpose of purchasing a suitable present to celebrate the royal nuptials. Two silver salvers were purchased, after which the balance of the Wedding Fund collected by the Home Civil Service and the Foreign Service was £14,037.

The Princess Elizabeth was touched by the kindness of the gesture and made her wish known that the balance should be handed over with the express intention that it be used to establish a social facility for civil servants "on condition that membership should be available to all grades and classes at a subscription within reach of all."

A suitable premises was found at 13–15 Great Scotland Yard and the Civil Service Club in Great Scotland Yard was brought into being as a social centre for all civil servants, both serving and retired, and opened its doors on the morning of 2 February 1953 where it continues to operate to this day. Her Late Majesty The Queen was the patron of The Civil Service Club from 1953 until her death. His Majesty The King accepted the Patronage of the Civil Service Club in May 2024.

Originally the building was a horse-drawn fire station. It has large windows at the front of the property which were originally the doors. In keeping with tradition, the building next door, on the way to Whitehall, is the Metropolitan Police horse stables.

The club provides a bar bistro with pub-style food, several meeting rooms and accommodation for members. It is a membership club for serving and former civil servants.

== In popular culture ==
In Ben Schott's homage to P. G. Wodehouse, Jeeves and the King of Clubs, Lord MacAuslan explains how the Associated Civil Service Club was once unable to get rid of an unpopular member. In the end, the committee forfeited the clubhouse lease, dissolved the club and reopened round the corner with a different name, but an identical membership, save one. "Does it not seem a remarkably expensive and convoluted undertaking to eject a single member?" a character asks. "Perhaps," says Lord MacAuslan, "but let us not forget, they were civil servants."

== Bibliography ==
- Quinlan, Mark (2020). "A Brief History of the Civil Service Club, Great Scotland Yard, Whitehall" (PDF).. London: Civil Service Club ISBN 978-1-5272-6019-1
- Seymour, Norman (1992). "The Story of 13 -15 Great Scotland Yard" (PDF). London: Ministry of Defence.
