= J. W. McKenzie =

J. W. McKenzie is a bookseller and publisher specialising in cricket literature. Born in South Africa, he is currently based in England.

His skilful cataloguing has attracted particular attention. "The catalogues, with their succinct descriptions of books, lithographs and cricketana," wrote friend Suresh Menon in 2008, "are a treat. Catalogue-writing (and producing) is an art form, and these show us why. The descriptions are technical, critical and focused. These are treasures of their own."
