= Great Scotland Yard =

Street in the St. James's district of Westminster, London

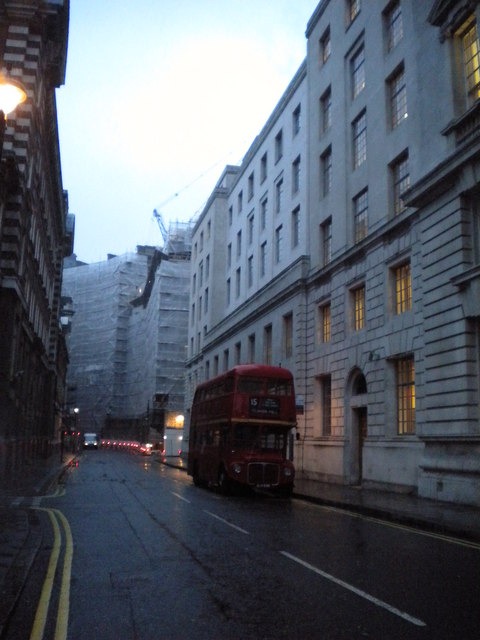
- Great Scotland Yard, at the junction with Scotland Place
- Interactive map of Great Scotland Yard
- Location: Westminster, Greater London
- Postal code: SW1
- Nearest train station: Charing Cross; Charing Cross
- Coordinates: 51.5064°N 0.1256°W

Great Scotland Yard is a street in Westminster, London, connecting Northumberland Avenue and Whitehall. By the 16th century, this "yard", which was then a series of open courtyards within the Palace of Whitehall, was fronted by buildings used by diplomatic representatives of the Kingdom of Scotland. Over time the land was divided into Great Scotland Yard, Middle Scotland Yard and Little Scotland Yard. In the 19th century, it was a street and open space, which was the location of a public entrance to the original headquarters of the Metropolitan Police Service of London, causing the name "Scotland Yard" to become synonymous with the police service.

== History ==
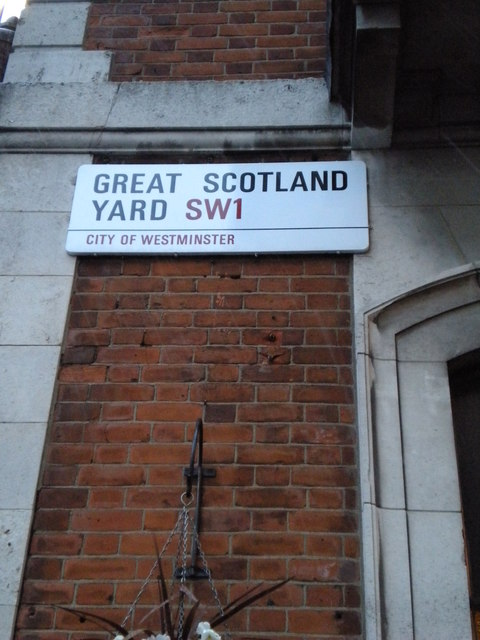
Street sign of Great Scotland Yard

Although the etymology is not certain, according to a 1964 article in The New York Times, the name derives from buildings that accommodated the diplomatic representatives of the Kingdom of Scotland and the Scottish kings when they visited the English court – in effect, acting as the Scottish embassy, although such an institution was not formalized. Scotland Yard was certainly built and so-named by 1515, as Henry VIII's sister, Margaret Tudor, Queen of Scots, was lodged there.

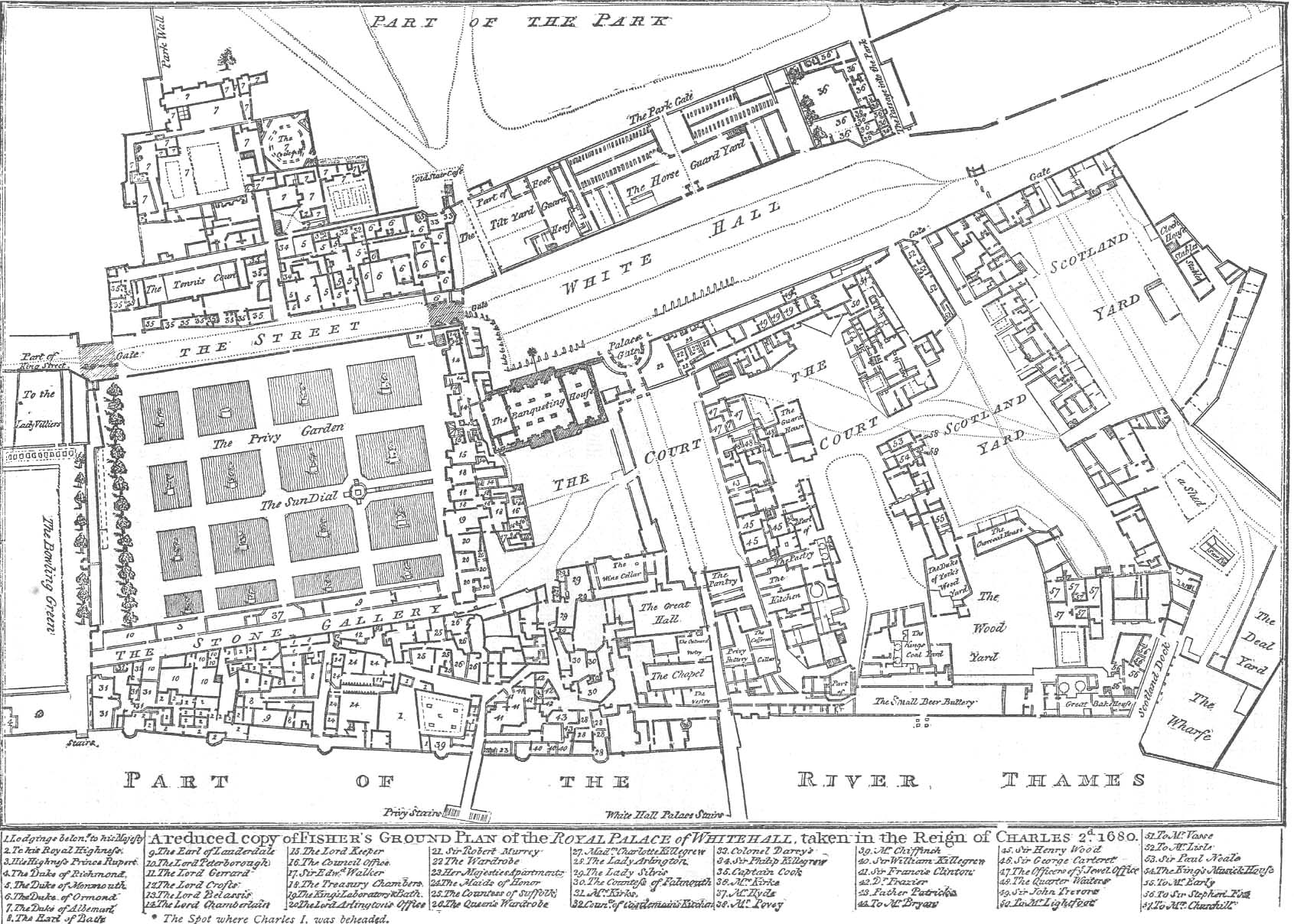
Scotland Yard (at right) within Whitehall Palace in 1680, before its destruction by fire in 1691

By the 17th century, the yard housed government buildings and residences for English civil servants. The architects Inigo Jones and Christopher Wren lived there, as did the poet John Milton from 1649 to 1651, during the Commonwealth of England under the rule of Oliver Cromwell. Towards the end of the 17th century, the district was already associated with prominence and prestige; for example in the 1690s in his satirical A Tale of a Tub, Jonathan Swift claimed the regard of "my worthy brethren and friends at Will's Coffee-house, and Gresham College, and Warwick Lane, and Moorfields, and Scotland Yard, and Westminster Hall, and Guildhall; in short, to all inhabitants and retainers whatsoever, either in court, or church, or camp, or city, or country...".

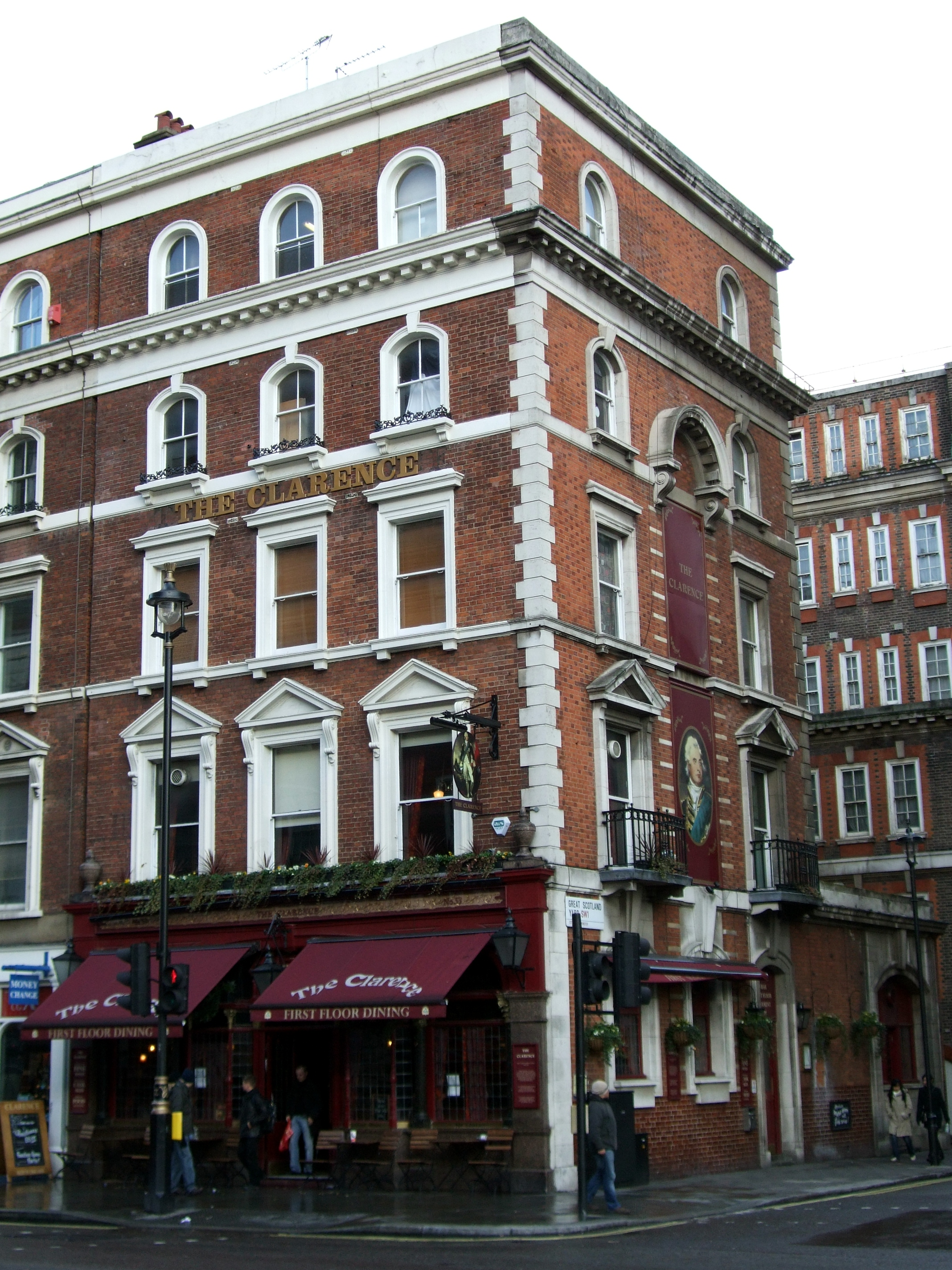
"The Clarence" pub at the corner of Great Scotland Yard and Whitehall

In the 19th century, the Metropolitan Police Service, the original Metropolitan Police Commissioner's office at 4 Whitehall Place, had its public entrance on Great Scotland Yard. An 1862 map of Westminster shows the location. Over time, Scotland Yard was used generally as a metonym for the police headquarters.

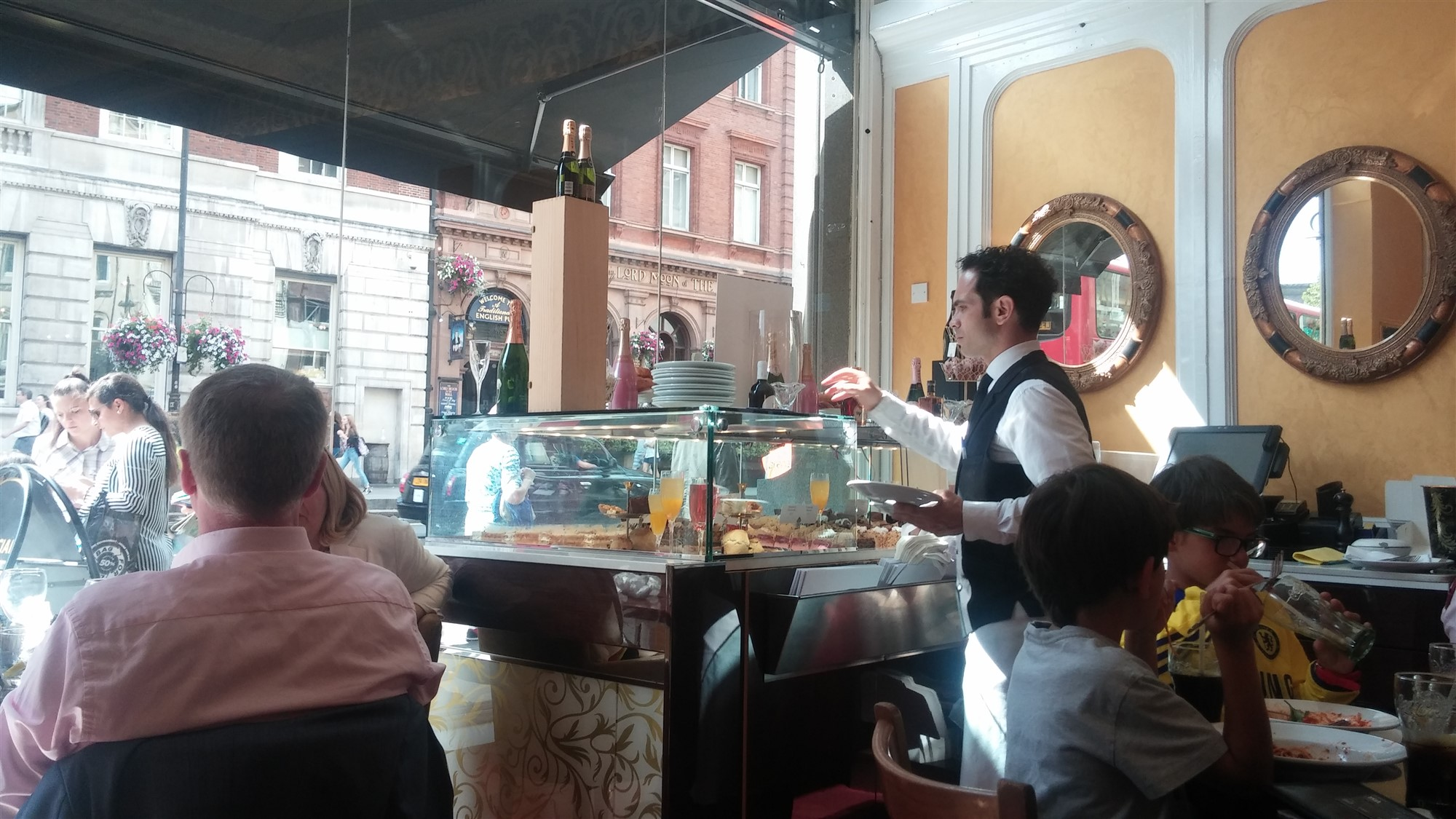
Interior of Caffè Concerto Whitehall

Richard Horwood's 1799 map of London shows Great Scotland Yard on the eastern side of Whitehall, opposite the Admiralty. Below it are two streets that are culs-de-sac: Middle Scotland Yard, where Whitehall Place is today, and Lower Scotland Yard, entered from Middle Scotland Yard. Lower Scotland Yard was where the War Office building was erected in 1906, but was, according to the 1862 map, renamed Middle Scotland Yard when Whitehall Place, originally a cul-de-sac, took the place of the original Middle Scotland Yard.

The Clarence public house, named after the Duke of Clarence, dates from 1896. It was originally attached to the opposite corner of Great Scotland Yard by an archway. The archway was removed during the 1908 redevelopment of Great Scotland Yard, and the end of the building was refaced with slightly different coloured bricks.

Since 1953, The Civil Service Club has been based in the Old Fire House at numbers 13–15, and is a social club for current and former members of the Civil Service.

== Great Scotland Yard Hotel ==
3–5 Great Scotland Yard is now a five-star Hyatt luxury hotel located on Great Scotland Yard Road in Westminster. It has a very long history as it sits on the previous site of the Ministry of Defence Library, but was built in 1906 as the Central London Recruiting Office. The hotel has 151 rooms with 15 suites and a stand-alone townhouse located at 1 Great Scotland Yard. The Edwardian townhouse has its own private entrance and has two bedrooms across five floors. The hotel also contains four bars and restaurants and a gym.

The history of the building is split between the back and the front of the hotel.

=== The back of the hotel ===
==== 997–1541 ====
It has been claimed that the Kings of Scotland had part of Whitehall Palace for their use when they visited Westminster, and that this is the origin of the name "Great Scotland Yard".

In approximately 997–1005, a residence was first given to Kenneth III of Scotland, as his residence. The last of the Scottish royal family who resided here was Margaret, Queen of Scots, wife of James IV of Scotland and sister to King Henry VIII. She resided here after the death of her husband at the Battle of Flodden.

==== 1541–1910 ====
After 1541, it was used as the homes of prominent civil servants due to its proximity to Whitehall Palace. These included Inigo Jones, who designed Covent Garden, Lincoln Inn Fields and Banqueting House, and Christopher Wren who designed St Paul's Cathedral and many London churches. The English poet John Milton, who wrote Paradise Lost, lived on-site from 1649 to 1651.

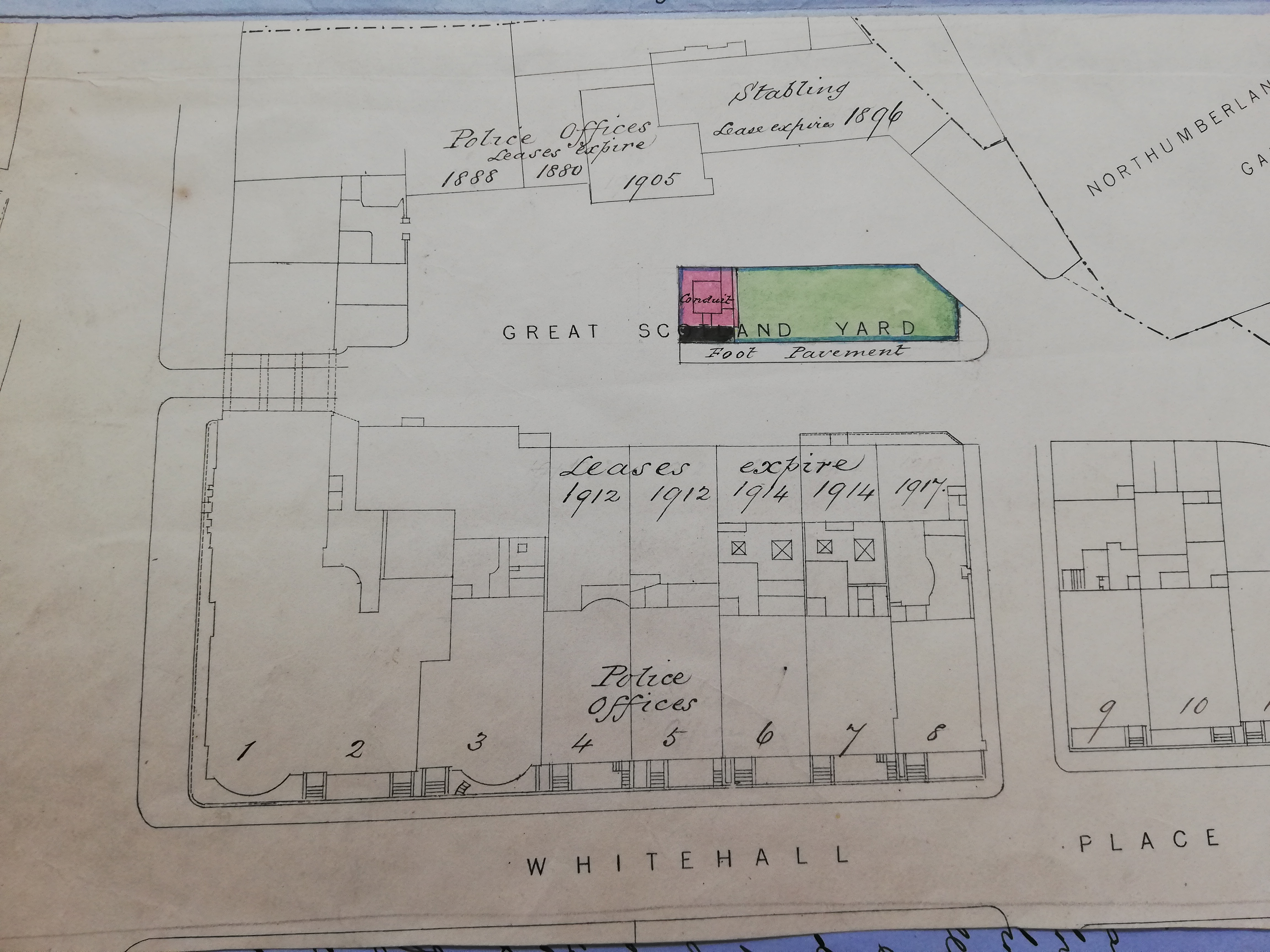
Premises occupied by the Metropolitan Police from 1837.

This house was originally named the Marshalsea Court House. There were also numerous private residences until 1910. On the right-hand side of the Marshalsea Court House were Royal Stables constructed before 1812 (exact date unknown). They were the stables for the Admiralty and then was used by the police from 1837 onwards. The police also expanded into the Marshalsea Court House from 1847.

The current building as we know it was constructed in 1910.

=== The front of the hotel ===
==== Pre-1812 ====
Not much is known about this space. It is likely that it was an empty courtyard until 1812, where a coach house and reservoir were built to house the king's horses and stewards.

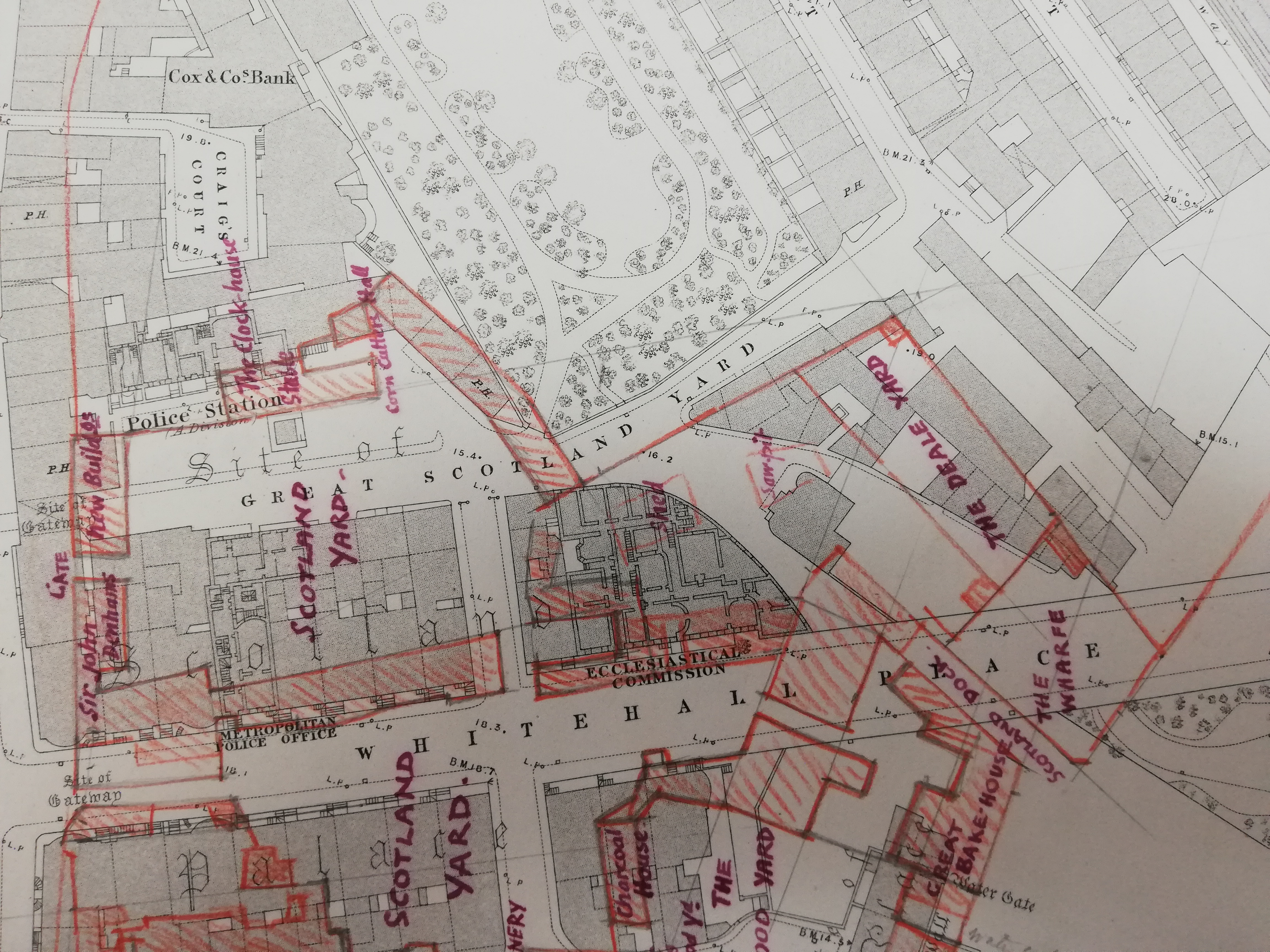
UK National Archives MPEE 1 105 Middlesex Westminster (now in the London Borough of Westminster)

==== 1812–1874 ====
Not much changed between these years and the building continued to be used as the Royal Stables. Then, in 1873 the Metropolitan Police brought the stables from the Waterloo and Whitehall Railway company and built the Hackney Carriage and Detective Department in 1874. The building was the first dedicated space for the detective department and was where all the high-profile cases were processed and high-profile prisoners were held.

The striking and individual architecture of Great Scotland Yard is recognisable and iconic to many worldwide. Its Edwardian red brick, Portland stone and the famous green doors were all part of the 1874 design. The green doors have borne witness to many historic events and characters and have become a symbol and shorthand for Great Scotland Yard as part of the city of London's rich heritage.

==== 1874–1910 ====
On 30 May 1884, the Fenians exploded a bomb at the location, which blew a hole in the wall of Scotland Yard, and damaged the Rising Sun public house. People came to inspect the damage, and the proprietor charged 3d (equivalent to £1.34 in 2025) a head for spectators, and his premises thereby gained unsought attention.

Later that year, the Metropolitan Police repaired the building and converted it to accommodate living quarters for the Police Commissioner and his top deputies on the first floor. The façade as we know it was refurbished in 1910, along with the sides of the hotel, creating the building as we know it now.

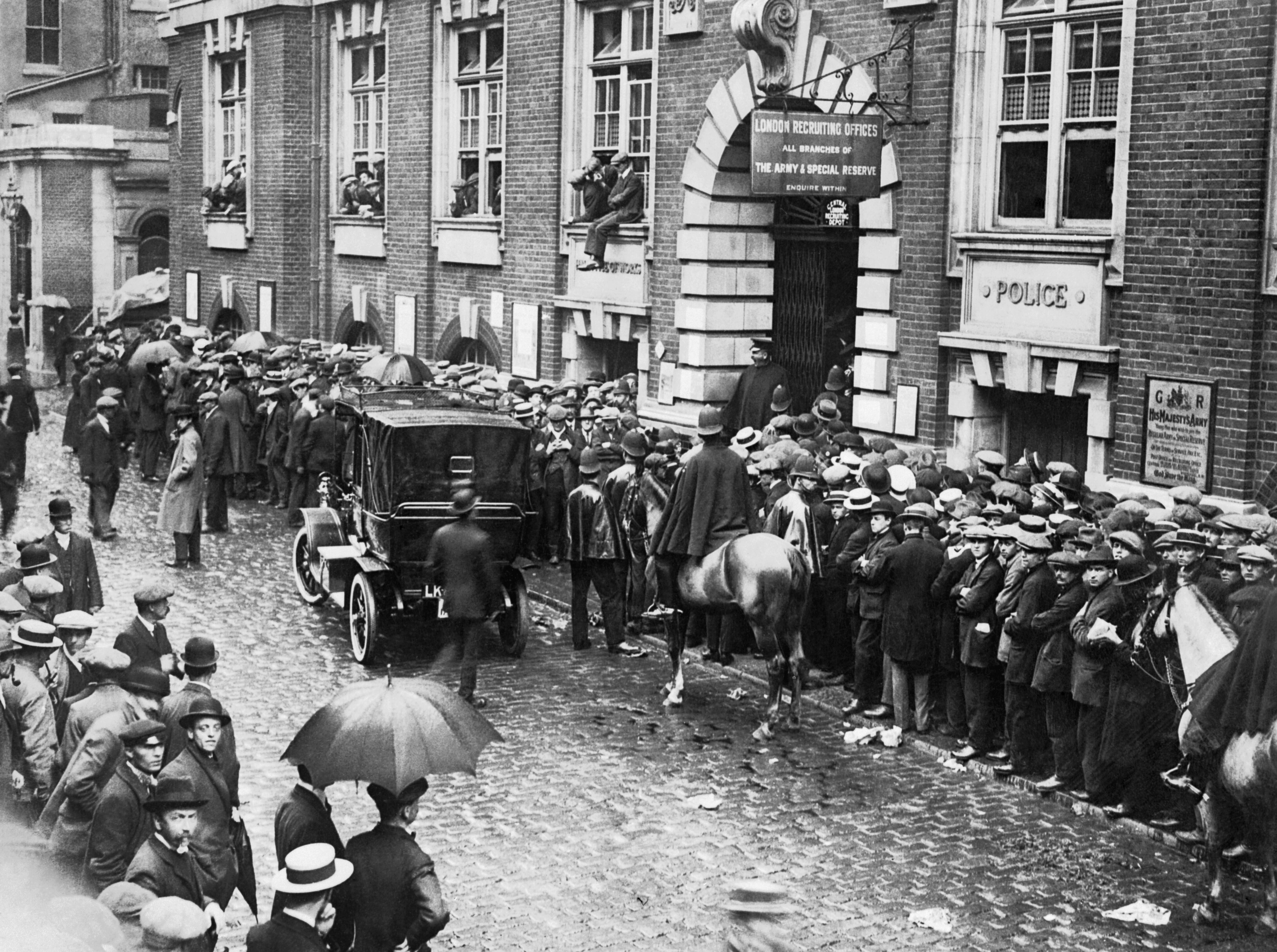
Army Recruitment Office – August 1914

==== History of the whole building, 1910–2013 ====
The current Edwardian building was completed in 1910 and served as the British Army Recruitment Office for World War I and World War 2. It was used by the Ministry of Defence until 2013, first as a recruitment office and then as a library until 2004.

In 2013, the building was purchased by the UAE company LuLu Group for £110 million.

== Filming location ==
A World War II scene in the motion picture Atonement (2007) with Keira Knightley and James McAvoy was filmed in this road, as was a scene from Harry Potter and the Deathly Hallows – Part 1 (2010). The road was also used as part of the car chase scene from the James Bond film Skyfall (2012).. It was also used for the opening scene of the Marvel Studios film Doctor Strange in 2016.
