= John Barclay (cricketer) =

English-Hong Kong cricketer (born 1954)

Personal information
- Full name: John Robert Troutbeck Barclay
- Born: 22 January 1954 (age 72); Bonn, Germany
- Nickname: Trout
- Height: 5 ft 10 in (1.78 m)
- Batting: Right-handed
- Bowling: Off spin
- Role: All-rounder
- Relatives: Francis Ford (Great-uncle)

International information
- National side: Hong Kong

Domestic team information
- Years: Team
- 1970–1986: Sussex
- 1978–1979: Orange Free State
- 1977: Marylebone Cricket Club (MCC)

Career statistics
Competition	First-class	List A
Matches	274	236
Runs scored	9677	2792
Batting average	24.81	21.81
100s/50s	9/46	0/7
Top score	119	93*
Balls bowled	20980	6150
Wickets	324	167
Bowling average	30.66	25.49
5 wickets in innings	9	2
10 wickets in match	1	0
Best bowling	6/61	5/43
Catches/stumpings	214/0	79/0
- Source: CricketArchive, 2 February 2009

John Robert Troutbeck Barclay DL (born 22 January 1954) is a former English- Hong Kong cricketer, who played internationally once for Hong Kong.

John Barclay was born in Bonn, Germany. He was educated at Summer Fields School and Eton. He made his first-class debut for Sussex, while still at school in 1970.

He was an opening batsman, having an excellent technique and eye. He also bowled off-spin, dismissing Ian Botham and Viv Richards several times. He succeeded Arnold Long as the County Captain of Sussex County Cricket Club in 1981 and led the team to second place in the County Championship (behind Nottinghamshire). The following season he led the county to first place in the John Player League, Sussex only losing one game all season. Previously he had won the Gillette Cup with Sussex in 1978, dismissing Richards, bowling 12 cheap overs, and scoring 44 in the Final. He was rated as one of the best county captains around and he was tipped for the Test captaincy. He was forced to retire in 1986, due to a finger injury.

Late on in his career he was involved in a small controversy in the extremely tight finish to 1984 County Championship. According to the recollection of Nottinghamshire captain Clive Rice, in Nottinghamshire's penultimate match: "We had played Sussex ... and their captain, John Barclay, had decided that, because we had beaten them to the Championship in 1981, he was not even going to give us a game. So it ended in a draw. He gave us a pathetic declaration figure." Nottinghamshire then narrowly lost their final match of the season and were pipped for the Championship by Essex.

After his playing career ended he served as the Director of Cricket at the Friends of Arundel Castle Cricket Club, in tandem with the Arundel Castle Cricket Foundation (1986–2020).

He has been a successful tour manager, as he took the England Under-19's, the England A's and also managed the England team for two tours. He won plaudits particularly for his role with a successful England A tour of India and Bangladesh in 1994–5, Simon Hughes writing in February 1995 that Barclay "has demonstrated how valuable it is to have an empathy with the country you are in - he was still smiling even when the engine of the team bus briefly caught fire."

He briefly returned to management with the blind team, but he is now working for the Marylebone Cricket Club (MCC).

Between 1986 and his retirement in 2020, he ran a charity, the Arundel Castle Cricket Foundation for young cricketers and underprivileged children in Arundel, West Sussex.

He holds a number of posts, such as president of the Cricket Society and the English Schools Cricket Association.

He is a Trustee of the Hornsby Professional Cricketers' Fund charity.

He is a past chairman of the Sussex Cricket Board and chairman of cricket for Sussex County Cricket Club.

He served as president of the Marylebone Cricket Club for 2009–10.

He is also a governor of Dorset House School, Bury, West Sussex.

He is currently president of The Forty Club.

== Books ==
- Barclay, John (2002). The Appeal of the Championship: Sussex in the Summer of 1981. Fairfield Books. ISBN 978-0-95311966-0. Archived from the original on 29 December 2018.
- Barclay, John (2008). Life Beyond the Airing Cupboard. Fairfield Books. ISBN 978-0-9560702-0-3.
- Barclay, John (2013). Lost in the Long Grass. Fairfield Books. ISBN 978-0-95685113-0. Archived from the original on 29 December 2018.
- Edited with Stephen Chalke (2016). Team Mates. Fairfield Books. ISBN 0-95685-117-7

Sporting positions
Preceded by Arnold Long	Sussex county cricket captain 1981–1986	Succeeded by Ian Gould
