= Victoria Hughes =

British lavatory attendant and author

Victoria Hughes

Victoria Hughes (née Rogers, 22 June 1897 – 30 August 1978) was a British lavatory attendant, and the first of her profession to have an entry in the Oxford Dictionary of National Biography, having published her memoirs Ladies' Mile (1977) at the age of 80, which some found shocking but which have since become a valuable local history resource.

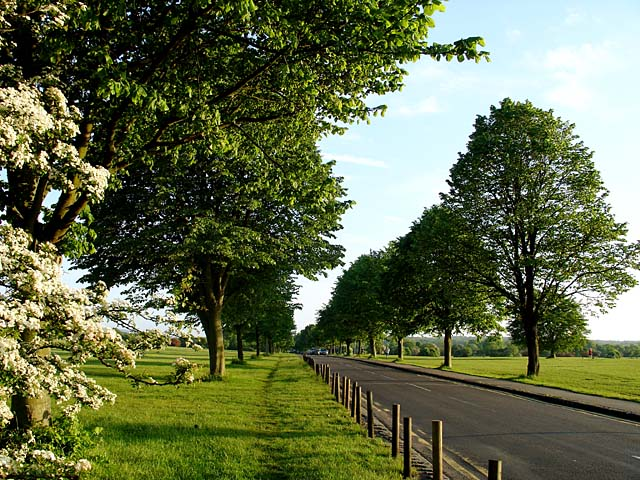
Ladies Mile, Durdham Down

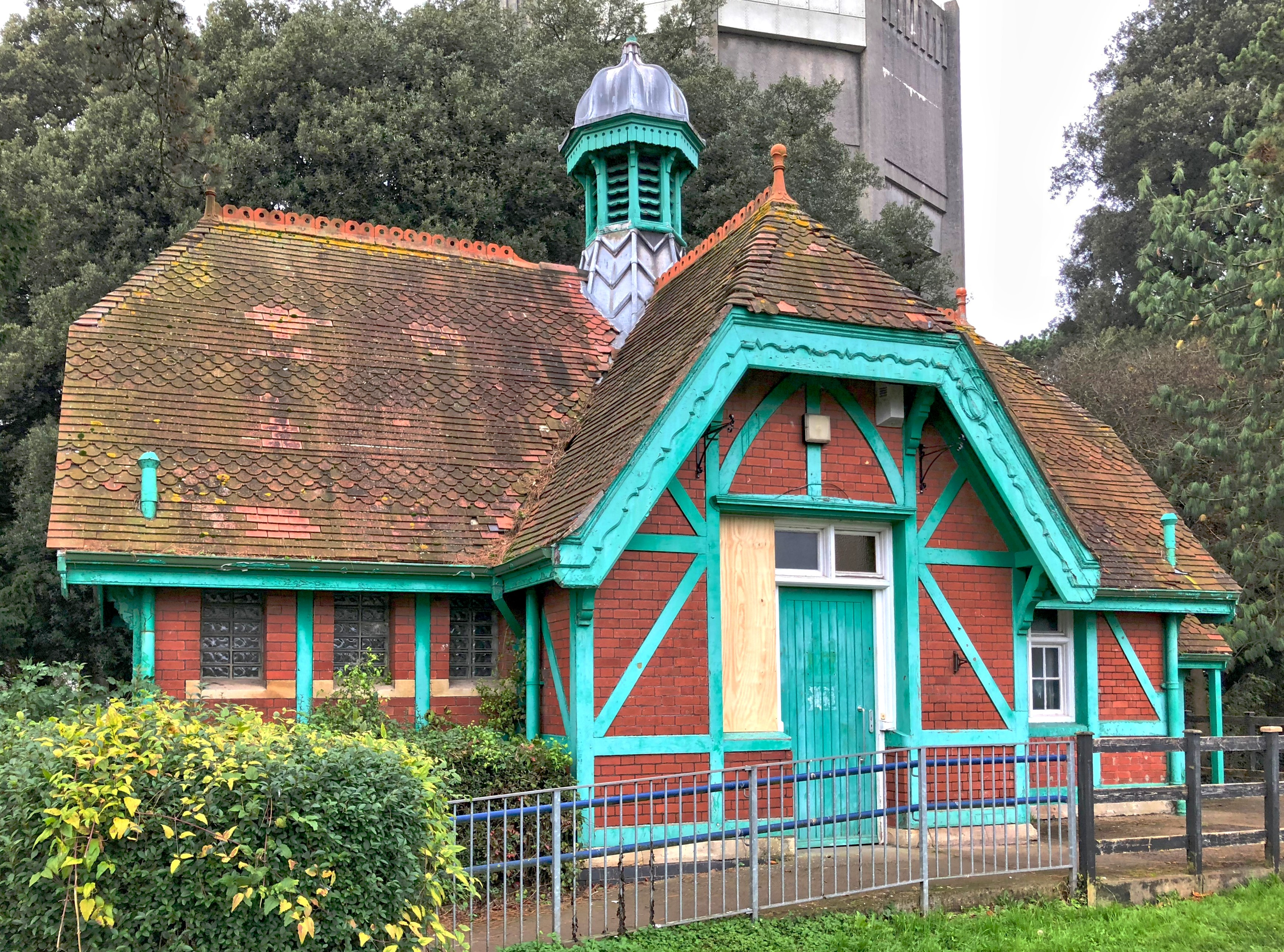
The public toilets in Stoke Road, Bristol, where Hughes worked.

== Early life ==
Victoria Hughes was born Victoria Rogers on 22 June 1897 at Woodbury Lane, off Blackboy Hill, Bristol. She was the fifth of ten children of Alfred William Rogers, a scaffolder, and his wife, Ellen Rogers.

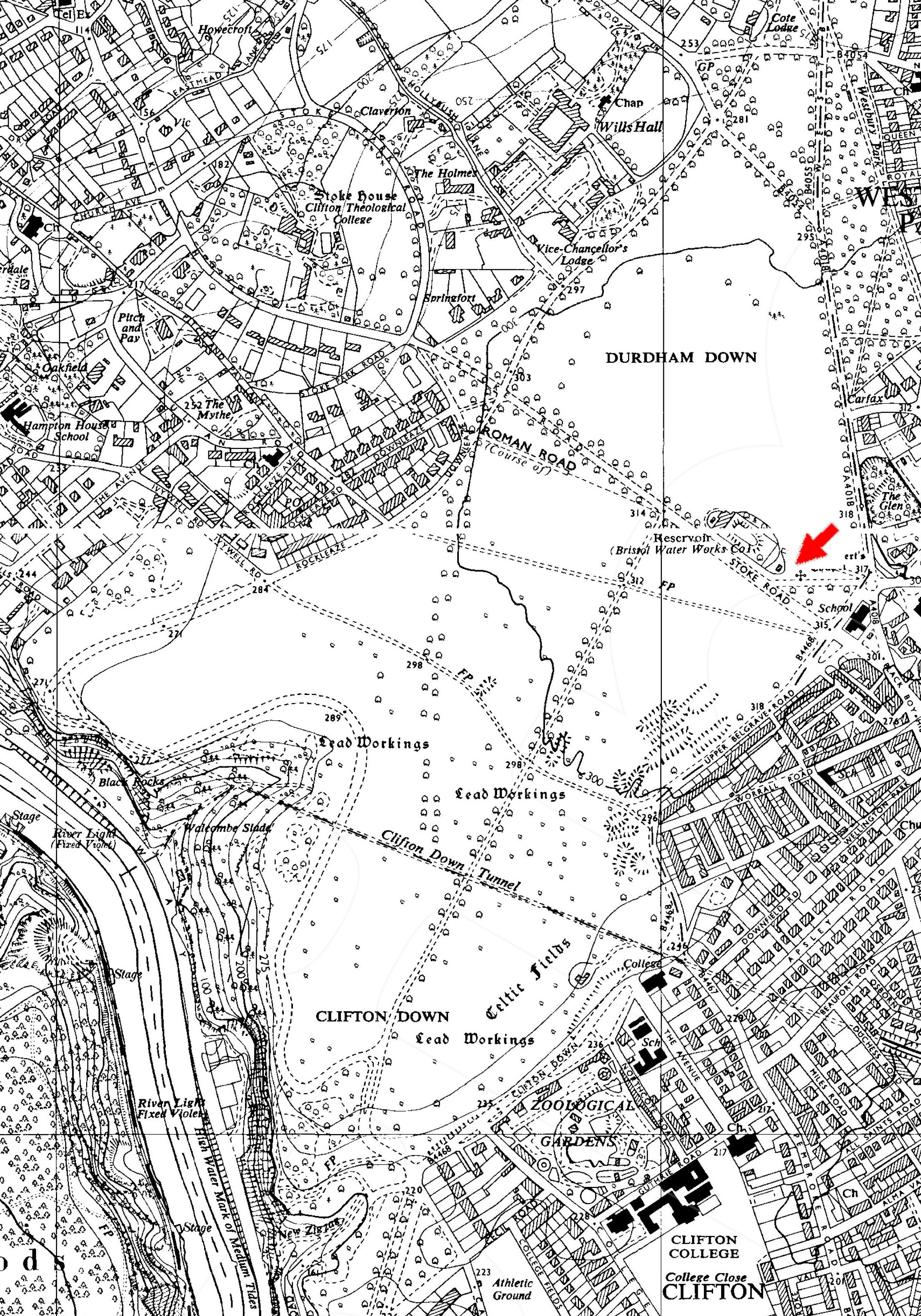
A 1955 map of Durdham Down showing the Ladies Mile diagonally, centre, running south from Stoke Road. Hughes' workplace indicated by arrow.

On 16 July 1916, she married Richard Hughes (1896–1965), an apprentice ironmonger, who the same day left to fight in France as a member of the Royal Berkshire Regiment during the First World War. He was present at the Battle of the Somme. They had two daughters together, Margaret (born 1920) and Barbara (born 1931).

== Career ==
Hughes' husband returned from the war with "trench foot, a limp, and failing eyesight". She became the family's main breadwinner.

From 1929, until her retirement in May 1962, Hughes worked as what she described as a "loo lady" at a public toilet in Stoke Road on Bristol's Durdham Down. She soon discovered that many of her customers were prostitutes working the nearby Ladies Mile, and although thoroughly respectable herself, she did not judge, instead providing tea, sympathy and advice. She also kept notebooks about her working life.

In 1977, aged 80, Hughes published her memoirs as Ladies' Mile. The book "shocked some at the time, but since has become a valued source of local history".

== Later life ==
From 1958, Mr. and Mrs. Hughes lived in a terraced house at 255 Gloucester Road, Bishopston, Bristol, where she died on 30 August 1978, from cancer. In 2003, a blue plaque was unveiled by David Foot who had written the book for her on the public conveniences where she worked, and in 2006 she became the first of her profession to be given an entry in the Oxford Dictionary of National Biography.
