= Geoffrey Moorhouse =

English journalist and author (1931–2009)

Geoffrey Moorhouse, FRGS, FRSL (29 November 1931 – 26 November 2009) was an English journalist and author. He was born Geoffrey Heald in Bolton and took his stepfather's surname. He attended Bury Grammar School. He began writing as a journalist on the Bolton Evening News. At the age of 27, he joined The Manchester Guardian where he eventually became chief feature writer and combined writing books with journalism.

Many of his books were largely based on his travels. He was elected Fellow of the Royal Geographical Society in 1972, Fellow of the Royal Society of Literature in 1982, and received an honorary Doctor of Letters from the University of Warwick. His book To The Frontier won the Thomas Cook Award for the best travel book of its year in 1984. He had recently concentrated on Tudor history, with The Pilgrimage of Grace and Great Harry's Navy. He lived in a hill village in North Yorkshire. In an interview given in 1999, he described his approach to his writing.

All three of Moorhouse's marriages ended in divorce. He had two sons, Andrew and Michael, and two daughters, Jane and Brigie, the latter of whom died of cancer in 1981. He died aged 77 of a stroke. At the time of his death, he was engaged to Professor Susan Bassnett; and had two sons and one daughter, as well as four grandchildren. His writing on the sport of rugby league is some of the greatest associated with the game: his series of essays entitled At The George in particular are a powerful and eloquent homage to a deeply held love.

== Books ==
- The Press (Ward Lock Educational, London 1964)
- Britain in the Sixties: The Other England (Penguin, Harmondsworth, 1964)
- The Church (Oxford University Press, London, 1967)
- Against All Reason (Weidenfeld & Nicolson, London, 1969)
- Calcutta (Weidenfeld & Nicolson, London, 1971)
- The Missionaries (Eyre Methuen, London, 1973)
- The Fearful Void (Hodder & Stoughton, London, 1974)
- The Diplomats: The Foreign Office Today (Cape, London, 1977)
- The Boat and the Town (Hodder & Stoughton, London & Toronto, 1979)
- The Best Loved Game: One Summer of English Cricket (Hodder & Stoughton, London, 1979)
- San Francisco (Time-Life Books, Amsterdam, 1979)
- Prague (Time-Life Books, Amsterdam, 1980)
- India Britannica (Harvill, London, 1983)
- Lord's (Hodder & Stoughton, London, 1983)
- To the Frontier (Hodder & Stoughton, London, 1984)
- Rail Across India: A Photographic Journey (New Cavendish, London, 1985)
- Imperial City: The Rise and Rise of New York (Hodder & Stoughton, London, 1988)
- At the George and Other Essays on Rugby League (Hodder & Stoughton, London, 1989)
- The Nile (Barrie & Jenkins, London, 1989)
- Apples in the Snow: A Journey to Samarkand (Hodder & Stoughton, London, 1990)
- On The Other Side: A Journey Through Soviet Central Asia (Henry Holt, 1991)
- Hell's Foundations: A Town, Its Myths, and Gallipoli (Hodder & Stoughton, London, 1992)
- OM: An Indian Pilgrimage (Hodder & Stoughton, London, 1993)
- A People's Game: The Centenary History of Rugby League Football, 1895 – 1995 (Hodder & Stoughton, London, 1995) ISBN 0-340-62834-0
- Sun Dancing: A Medieval Vision (Weidenfeld & Nicolson, London, 1997)
- Sydney (Weidenfeld & Nicolson, London, 1999)
- The Last Office, 1539 and The Dissolution of a Monastery (Phoenix 2008)
- The Pilgrimage of Grace, 1536-7: The Rebellion That Shook Henry VIII's Throne (Phoenix, 2003)
- Great Harry's Navy (Phoenix new edition, 2006)
