= Stephen Fay =

British journalist and author

- Born: 14 August 1938; Littleborough, Lancashire
- Died: 12 May 2020 (aged 81)
- Occupations: Journalist; author

Stephen Francis John Fay (14 August 1938 – 12 May 2020) was a British journalist and author.
