= Wisden Cricket Monthly =

British cricket magazine

- Editor-in-chief: Phil Walker
- Former editors: David Frith (founding editor); Tim de Lisle; Stephen Fay
- Categories: Cricket
- Frequency: Monthly
- Format: Print and digital
- Publisher: Platform Media
- Founder: David Frith
- Founded: 1979 (revived 2017)
- First issue: June 1979
- Final issue: September 2003 (original run)
- Company: Cricket Properties Limited
- Country: United Kingdom
- Based in: London, England
- Language: English
- Website: wisden.com/wisden-cricket-monthly
- ISSN: 2515-2815 (print); 2515-2823 (web)

Wisden Cricket Monthly (WCM) is a UK-based print and digital cricket magazine available to buy worldwide.

The original version ran from June 1979 to September 2003. The magazine was revived in November 2017, launching with an Ashes Special which included exclusive interviews with Joe Root, Steve Smith, Alastair Cook and Mike Brearley.

WCM's editor-in-chief is Phil Walker, with Jo Harman as magazine editor – the former editor and deputy editor of All Out Cricket, respectively. John Stern, former editor of The Wisden Cricketer, is editor-at-large.

WCM has a 10-strong editorial board comprising Wisden editor Lawrence Booth, Wisden India editor Suresh Menon, Isa Guha, David Lloyd, Paul Allott, Alison Mitchell, Elizabeth Ammon, Mark Butcher, Christian Ryan and Daniel Norcross.

Columnists include Daily Telegraph journalist Isabelle Westbury, Australian broadcaster Adam Collins and ESPNcricinfo UK editor Andrew Miller.

As well as Wisden Cricket Monthly, wisden.com was relaunched in November 2017. Ben Gardner is the website's managing editor, Yas Rana operates as its head of content and Aadya Sharma is the Wisden India editor. The Wisden Cricket Weekly podcast, that features a combination of the website and magazine team and has included guests such as David Gower, Graham Thorpe, and Steve Harmison, was launched in October 2018.

The driving force behind the creation of WCM was its first editor, David Frith, formerly an editor of its rival, The Cricketer. At first, it operated under the Wisden name using licence from John Wisden & Co. Wisden later bought a controlling interest.

After 202 editions, Frith gave way to Tim de Lisle, before Stephen Fay took over from de Lisle after he moved to Wisden's online venture. The last issue of the original WCM, in September 2003, coincided with Fay's 65th birthday and his retirement.
