= The Cricketer =

Monthly cricket magazine published in London since 1921

- Editor: Huw Turbervill
- Categories: Cricket
- Frequency: Monthly
- Circulation: 22,000 (2014)
- Publisher: The Cricketer Publishing Ltd
- Founder: Sir Pelham Warner
- Founded: 1921
- First issue: 30 April 1921
- Country: United Kingdom
- Based in: London
- Language: English
- Website: www.thecricketer.com
- ISSN: 1740-9519

The Cricketer is a monthly English cricket magazine providing writing and photography from international, county, club and schools cricket.

== History ==
The magazine was founded in 1921 by Sir Pelham Warner, an ex-England captain turned cricket writer. Warner edited the magazine until 1963. Later editors included E. W. Swanton, Christopher Martin-Jenkins, Reg Hayter and Simon Hughes.

The magazine is responsible for the National Village Cup, an annual competition between village cricket sides, with the final played at Lord's. It devised the Cricketer Cup competition for old boys' teams from the public schools, which began with 16 teams in 1967 and has since expanded.

It also publishes an annual schools' guide, featuring the best 100 secondary, 50 primary, 20 girls' and 20 state schools for cricket.

For many years from the 1960s it was owned and run by the Brocklehurst family. Former Somerset captain Ben was in charge, with his wife Belinda and son Tim key players in the magazine's history. After surviving for more than 80 years as an independent publication, the magazine was then purchased by Wisden, which merged it in 2003 with Wisden Cricket Monthly. A new magazine called The Wisden Cricketer enjoyed some success under the editorship of John Stern over the next eight years. In December 2010, a private equity company called Test Match Extra Ltd – which owned and ran a cricket website of the same name – bought the magazine from the then owners BSkyB.

TME are a group of business people who share a passion for cricket. Neil Davidson, the former chair of Leicestershire CCC, chairs the TME board; shareholders include The Rt Hon Lord Marland, Marie Melnyk and Nigel Peet.

In May 2011, the magazine dropped 'Wisden' from the masthead and became The Cricketer (in association with Wisden). Stern left as editor later that month.

Andrew Miller joined as editor in January 2012, with former Nottinghamshire cricketer Andy Afford appointed as publishing director. Afford soon took on the role of managing director and when Miller departed, Simon Hughes, a former Middlesex and Durham bowler, and Channel 4's The Analyst, became the title's editor-at-large from 1 September 2014. Supporting the appointment of Hughes, Alec Swann joined as head of editorial planning and production after four-and-a-half years with the Northamptonshire Evening Telegraph. However, when Hughes became the magazine's full editor with effect from the April 2016 edition, Swann was no longer involved with the publication. Huw Turbervill worked with Hughes as managing editor of the magazine.

In 2021 The Cricketer celebrated its centenary, with a decade-by-decade history published on a monthly basis.

In November 2021, Huw Turbervill became editor of the magazine. James Coyne is deputy editor. Geoff Barton is art director. Jim Hindson, the former Nottinghamshire spin bowler, is the managing director of the business. Nick Howson is in charge of The Cricketer's digital journalism. George Dobell is chief correspondent. It won the Outstanding Online Coverage of Domestic Cricket award at the ECB Domestic Journalism Awards for four years in a row, from 2019–2022.

The Cricketer is the world best-selling cricket title, with an ABC-audited circulation of 22,000. It is available in digital format for mobile and tablet devices via iTunes, Google Play and Amazon.com publishing platforms.

The Cricketer Publishing Limited owns The Cricketer, along with other assets that include CricketArchive, The National Village Cup, Thecricketer.com and TestMatchSofa.com.
