= Cricket in fiction =

The sport of cricket has long held a special place in Anglophone culture, and a specialised niche in English literature. Cricket is the official summer sport in England, and it is widely known as the "gentleman's game", owing to the unique culture of the sport and its emphasis on ideals such as grace, sportsmanship, character and complexity. Cricket has therefore often attracted the attention (and in some cases, fandom) of the literati – Lamb, Hazlitt and Leigh Hunt were all players of the game – and some of the greatest English writers have written about cricket. This was particularly true in the era before the Second World War, for example, during the Edwardian era, and in the 1920s and 1930s.

== Victorian literature ==
An early chapter of Dickens's famous first novel The Pickwick Papers, serialised as early as 1836, features a brief description of a cricket match between the All-Muggleton team and the Dingley Dell Cricket Club. Mr Pickwick watches as Mr Jingle provides a running commentary on the game ("Capital game—smart sport—fine exercise—very" is a typical Jingle comment.)

Cricket also plays a prominent part in Tom Brown's Schooldays (1857), Thomas Hughes' classic novel of life at Rugby. A century after Hughes's book, the school's bully Flashman (and his cricket career) were resurrected by the novelist George MacDonald Fraser (see below). Anthony Trollope also wrote occasionally about cricket.

E. W. Hornung wrote a series of short stories about the adventures of the gentleman thief A. J. Raffles, who was a fine cricketer. In The Field Bazaar, a short story by Arthur Conan Doyle, Sherlock Holmes and Dr. John Watson discuss Watson's history as a cricketer and his plans to help the University of Edinburgh raise money for a new cricket pavilion.

== Cricket in pre-WWII literature ==
There have been several famous cricket matches in post-Victorian literature, notably the village cricket match which forms the centrepiece of A. G. Macdonell's minor classic England, Their England (1933).

Another well-known example comes from the work of Siegfried Sassoon. In 1928, Sassoon, by then a famed war poet, published Memoirs of a Fox-Hunting Man, the first volume of his George Sherston trilogy. The book, ostensibly a novel, is in effect a lyrical love-letter from the author to his vanished Edwardian childhood, set in the dreamy English countryside. The Butley flower show match is a classic evocation of cricket on the village green.

Cricket played a role in the Lord Peter Wimsey novels of Dorothy Sayers. There are numerous references to Wimsey's achievements as a cricket blue at Oxford, and an extensive description of a game of cricket is a crucial element in solving the murder in Murder Must Advertise (1933).

Another writer from this period is Hugh de Sélincourt. He wrote two novels with cricket as their subject – The Cricket Match (1924) is better known than its successor The Game of the Season (1935). Oxford University Press reprinted both these books in the early 1980s.

The novel Son of Grief by Dudley Carew (1936) was rated highly by John Arlott. He wrote: It has its darknesses, but it is convincing, and its characters are rounded and credible.

The great humorist P. G. Wodehouse was an avid fan of the game and a dedicated player as well – winning admiration for his medium paced bowling. Cricket is central to the plot of his novel Mike (1909) and its sequels including Psmith in the City (1910), which feature talented cricketer Michael "Mike" Jackson and his friend Psmith, also revealed to be a talented player. Wodehouse's cricketing companions included J. M. Barrie, Hugh de Selincourt and Arthur Conan Doyle, playing for either the "Punch XI" or the Allahakbarries, whose name, said Barrie, derived from the Arabic invocation meaning "Heaven help us". (This is technically incorrect as the meaning of the Arabic phrase Allahu Akbar is God is great.) Cricket popped up frequently in his novels and short stories, and the anthology Wodehouse at the Wicket, edited by Murray Hedgcock, is an attempt to capture the Master's writings about his favourite sport.

J. M. Barrie and A. A. Milne – creators of Peter Pan and Winnie the Pooh respectively – also wrote about cricket.

== Post-war fiction ==
Bruce Hamilton wrote the novel Pro: An English tragedy in 1946. Also in 1946 came The Devil in Woodford Wells, a novel by Harold Hobson (1946).

William Godfrey (a pseudonym of Sam Youd) wrote the first two novels of what had been intended to be a trilogy: The Friendly Game (1956) and Malleson at Melbourne (1957).

In the 1960s, Leslie Frewin edited a couple of anthologies of literary cricket (including both short stories and extracts from novels) under the title The Best of Cricket's Fiction.

A Season in Sinji (1967) by J.L. Carr is a novel mainly set at a fictional RAF base in West Africa during the Second World War; it features a bizarre cricket match.

More recently, George MacDonald Fraser claimed in his novel Flashman's Lady (1977) that Harry Flashman was the first cricketer to record a "hat-trick". The caddish fictional hero participates in a cricket match at Lord's in 1842 that features some of the leading cricketers of that era – Felix, Fuller Pilch, and Alfred Mynn. (Flashman gets Felix's wicket through skill, Pilch's through luck, and Mynn's by 'knavery'.) MacDonald Fraser takes great care to describe the sights and sounds of Lord's as it was in the 1840s. Although very different from Sassoon's style, his descriptions of the cricket match and its setting often reach an idyllic beauty that fits in well with the romantic nostalgia for village cricket during much of the 20th century.

In Life, the Universe and Everything (1982), the third book in Douglas Adams's Hitchhiker series, Arthur Dent and Ford Prefect travel through the space-time continuum to Lord's, where a shocking act of cricket vandalism takes place – the Ashes trophy is stolen by a band of robber-robots from the planet Krikkit. The novel contains an alternative explanation of the genesis of the game – cricket is actually the product of a sort of "interspecies collective unconscious memory", and it is the humans who have shamelessly trivialised it into a sport.

About 50 years after the bodyline controversy, Paul Wheeler wrote a fictionalised account of that infamous series in Bodyline: The Novel (1983). Wheeler also wrote the script for the Australian mini-series Bodyline (1984).

Willie Rushton wrote the comic novel W.G. Grace's Last Case (1984), in which he imagined the cricketer having a side-line as a private detective.

Mike Marqusee, the American poet and journalist, wrote Slow Turn, which foresees the rise of the International Cricket Council and commercialisation of international cricket in 1986.

Also in the 1980s, the writer and broadcaster Peter Tinniswood published a series of ten books on cricket, fictional and humorous in nature.

Early professional cricket in the aftermath of the Napoleonic Wars forms part of the historical backdrop to Bernard Cornwell's novel, Gallows Thief (2002).

Cricket is a major part of the novella 24 for 3 (2007) by Jennie Walker, set in London, and the novel Netherland (2008) by Joseph O'Neill, set in New York.

Chinaman: The Legend of Pradeep Mathew by Shehan Karunatilaka (2008) (known only by the subtitle in the USA) is in large part, an exploration of Sri Lankan cricket.

In 2012 the former Derbyshire opening batsman and screenwriter Peter Gibbs wrote a novel, Settling the Score, about a fictional county match late in the 1969 season.

Nathan Leamon's novel The Test (2018) is set among the players during the final Test of an Ashes series in England.

In 2020, Nigel Hastilow wrote Close of Play about a fictional limited-overs match to decide the fate of a village cricket club.

== New Zealand cricket fiction ==
New Zealand has produced some cricket fiction (mainly works for children and young people) and two adult novels in Michael O’Leary's Out of It (1987) and W. J. Foote's Poetry in Motion: The Tragic Tale of the Pukemanu Prodigy, New Zealand's Greatest Slow Bowler (2003).

O’Leary's cult novella presents a fictionalised one-day match between New Zealand's mid-1980s team and an "Out of It XI" made up of rock stars, famous artists, poets and writers.

A new edition of Out of It appeared in 2012 edited by cricket poetry anthologist Mark Pirie and published by HeadworX in Wellington, New Zealand. Pirie also lists books of New Zealand cricket fiction as an appendix sourced from Rob Franks's comprehensive bibliography of New Zealand cricket literature, Kiwi Cricket Pages (UK, c2006).

== Australian cricket fiction ==
Malcolm Knox wrote the cricket crime novel A Private Man (2004), set against the background of a Test match in Sydney. Also in 2004 was Steven Carroll's The Gift of Speed, set during the West Indian tour of Australia in 1960-61.

Jock Serong's The Rules of Backyard Cricket (2016), another cricket crime novel, tells the story of the rivalry between two brothers in the Melbourne suburbs who grow up to play in the Australian team.

== See also ==
- Bibliography of cricket
- Cricket in film and television
- Poetry about cricket
