= Bibliography of cricket =

This is a bibliography of literary and historical works about cricket. The list is sorted by author's name. It is inevitably highly selective. The 1984 edition of E. W. Padwick's A Bibliography of Cricket (see below) had more than 10,000 entries.

== A ==
David Rayvern Allen

- Arlott on Cricket (1984) (editor)
- Cricket on the Air (1985) (editor)
- Early Books on Cricket (1987)

HS Altham

- MCC Cricket Coaching Book, 1st edition (1952)
- Hampshire County Cricket: The official history of Hampshire County Cricket Club (1957)
- A History of Cricket (with E W Swanton) – various editions, most recently 1962 (hb), 1968 (pb)
- Lord's and the MCC (with John Arlott) (1967)
- The Heart of Cricket: A memoir of H.S. Altham (1967)

John Arlott

- Indian Summer (1946)
- Gone to the Cricket (1948)
- How to Watch Cricket (1948; rev 1983)
- From Hambledon to Lords (1948)
- Concerning Cricket (1949)
- The Middle Ages of Cricket (1949)
- Gone with the Cricketers (1950)
- Cricket in the Counties (1950)
- Days at the Cricket (1951)
- Maurice Tate (1951)
- The Echoing Green (1952)
- Test Match Diary 1953 (1953)
- Australian Test Journal 1954-55 (1955)
- Alletson's Innings (1957)
- Cricket Journal (1958)
- Cricket Journal 2 (1959)
- Cricket Journal 3 : Cricket on Trial (1960)
- Cricket Journal 4 : The Australian Challenge (1961)
- Vintage Summer 1967 (1967)
- Cricket – The Great Ones : Eight First Class Batsmen (1967)
- Cricket – The Great Bowlers (1968)
- The Noblest Game: A Book of Fine Cricket Prints (with Neville Cardus) (1969)
- Cricket – The Great All-rounders (1970)
- Cricket – The Great Captains (1971)
- Fred – Portrait of a Fast Bowler (1971)
- The Ashes 1972 (1972)
- A Hundred Years of County Cricket (1973)
- An Eye for Cricket (with Patrick Eagar) (1979)
- John Arlott's Book of Cricketers (1979)
- Jack Hobbs : Profile of the Master (1981)
- A Word from Arlott (1983)
- Arlott on Cricket (1984) (edited by David Rayvern Allen)
- John Arlott's 100 Greatest Batsmen (1986)
- The Essential John Arlott (1989)
- Basingstoke Boy : The Autobiography (1989)

Geoff Armstrong

- A Century of Summers: 100 years of Sheffield Shield cricket, Randwick, Ironbark Press, 1992. (ISBN 1-875471-20-0)

F S Ashley-Cooper

- At the Sign of the Wicket (1900) – a series in Cricket Magazine reproducing notices of known matches played 1742 to 1751
- Sussex Cricket and Cricketers (1901)
- Curiosities of First-Class Cricket 1730-1901 (1901)
- The Hambledon Cricket Chronicle 1772-1796 (1924)
- Kent Cricket Matches 1719-1880 (1929)

Association of Cricket Statisticians and Historians

- A Guide to Important Cricket Matches Played in the British Isles 1707-1863 (1985)
- A Guide to First-Class Cricket Matches Played in the British Isles (2nd ed 1982)
- A Guide to First-Class Cricket Matches Played in Australia (2nd ed 1983)
- A Guide to First-Class Cricket Matches Played in India (1986)
- A Guide to First-Class Cricket Matches Played in New Zealand (1981)
- A Guide to First-Class Cricket Matches Played in North and South America (1987)
- A Guide to First-Class Cricket Matches Played in Pakistan (1989)
- A Guide to Important Cricket Matches Played in South Africa (1981)
- A Guide to First-Class Cricket Matches Played in Sri Lanka (1987)
- A Guide to First-Class Cricket Matches Played in the West Indies (1984)
- The ACS International Cricket Yearbook (2013 edition is the 28th year)
- The ACS Second Eleven Annual (2013 edition is the 29th year)
- The Cricket Statistician, a quarterly Journal for members
- The ACS Famous Cricketers Series (complete playing records, match by match, of notable cricketers, 100 were published in the series).

== B ==
Philip Bailey

- Who's Who of Cricketers (co-edited) (1984, second edition 1993)

Trevor Bailey

- The Greatest of My Time (1968)

Anthony Barker

- The WACA: An Australian Cricket Success Story (1998)

Ralph Barker

- Ten Great Innings (1964)
- Ten Great Bowlers (1967)
- England v Australia: A compendium of Test cricket between the countries 1877-1968 (with Irving Rosenwater) (1969)
- Cricketing Family Edrich (1976)
- Innings of a Lifetime, 1954-77 (1982)
- Purple Patches (1987)

Brian Bassano

- South Africa in International Cricket 1888–1970 (1979)
- The West Indies in Australia 1930-31 (with Rick Smith) (1990)
- A Springbok Down Under: South Africa on Tour, 1931-32 (with Rick Smith) (1991) (based on the diary of Ken Viljoen)
- Vic's Boys: Australia in South Africa 1935-36 (1993)
- South African Cricket: Vol. 4, 1947–1960 (1996)
- South Africa versus England: 106 Years of Test Match Glory (1996)
- MCC in South Africa 1938-39 (1997)
- Aubrey Faulkner: His Record Innings by Innings (2001)
- Mann's Men: MCC in South Africa 1922-23 (2004)
- The Visit of Mr W. W. Read's 1891-92 English Cricket Team to South Africa (with Rick Smith) (2007)
- Maiden Victory: The 1935 South African Tour of England (with Rick Smith) (2012)

Richie Benaud

- The Way of Cricket (1961)
- A Tale of Two Tests (1962)
- Spin Me a Spinner (1963)
- The New Champions (1966)
- Willow Patterns (1969)
- Test Cricket (1982)
- World Series Cup Cricket 1981-82 (1982)
- The Hottest Summer (1983)
- The Ashes 1982-83 (1983)
- Benaud on Reflection (1984)
- The Appeal of Cricket (1995)
- Anything But (1998)
- My Spin on Cricket (2005)
- Over But Not Out (2010)

Henry Bentley

- A Correct Account of all the Cricket Matches which have been played by the Mary-le-bone Club, and all other principal matches, from the Year 1786 to 1822 inclusive (1823)

Keith Booth

- Atherton's progress: From Kensington Oval to Kennington Oval (1996)
- Knowing the Score (1998) (a history of scoring)
- His Own Enemy (2000) (biography of Ted Pooley)
- The Father of Modern Sport: The Life and Times of Charles W. Alcock (2002)
- George Lohmann, Pioneer Professional (2007)
- Ernest Hayes – Brass in a Golden Age (2009)

Rowland Bowen

- Cricket: A History of its Growth and Development throughout the World (1970)

Derek Birley

- A Social History of English Cricket (1999)
- The Willow Wand: Some Cricket Myths Explored (1979)

Sir Don Bradman

- The Art of Cricket. Hodder & Stoughton. (1958) ISBN 1-875892-54-0 (1998 re-issue).
- The Story of My Cricketing Life with hints on Batting, Bowling, Fielding in the Cricketer Annual (1930)
- Farewell to Cricket (1949)

Mike Brearley

- The Art of Captaincy (1985)

Samuel Britcher

- A list of all the principal Matches of Cricket that have been played in the year x (annual series where x = 1790 to 1800)

Dick Brittenden

- Great Days in New Zealand Cricket (1958)
- New Zealand Cricketers (1961)
- The Finest Years: Twenty Years of New Zealand Cricket (1977) A.H. & A.W. Reed Ltd, ISBN 978-0589010331

Gerald Brodribb

- Next Man In : A survey of cricket laws and customs (1953, 1985, 1996)
- Hit for Six (1960)
- Felix on the Bat: Being a Memoir of Nicholas Felix (1962). (NB: See also Nicholas Wanostrocht: Felix on the Bat (1845)
- The Croucher: A Biography of Gilbert Jessop (1974)
- Maurice Tate: a biography (1977)
- The Lost Art (1997) (A history of underarm bowling)

G B Buckley

- Fresh Light on Eighteenth Century Cricket (1935)
- Fresh Light on Pre-Victorian Cricket (1937)

Alexander Buzo

- Legends of the Baggy Green (2004)

== C ==
Sir Neville Cardus

- A Cricketer's Book (1922)
- Days in the Sun (1924)
- Good Days (1934)
- Australian Summer (1937)
- Autobiography (1947)
- Second Innings (1950)
- Cricket All The Year (1952)
- Close of Play (1956)
- The Playfair Cardus (1963)
- The Noblest Game: A Book of Fine Cricket Prints (with John Arlott) (1969)
- Full Score (1970)
- Cardus on Cricket (1977)
- Cardus in the Covers (1978)
- Play Resumed With Cardus (1979)
- A Fourth Innings with Cardus (1981)
- The Roses Matches 1919-1939 (1982)
- A Cardus for All Seasons (1985)
- Cardus on the Ashes (1989)
- The Wisden Papers of Neville Cardus (Wisden Papers) (1989) (edited by Benny Green)

Dudley Carew

- England Over, A Cricket Book (1927)
- Son of Grief (novel; 1936)
- To The Wicket (1947)

Arthur Carman

- The Cricket Almanack of New Zealand
- New Zealand International Cricket 1894-1974

Richard Cashman

- Patrons, Players and the Crowd : The Phenomenon of Indian cricket (1980)
- 'Ave a go, yer mug ! Australian Cricket Crowds from Larrikin to Ocker (1984)
- The "Demon" Spofforth (1990) (ISBN 0-86840-004-1)

Stephen Chalke

- Runs in the Memory (1997)
- Caught in the Memory: County Cricket in the 1960s (1999)
- One More Run (2000) (with Bryan "Bomber" Wells)
- At the Heart of English Cricket: The Life and Memories of Geoffrey Howard (2001) (with Geoffrey Howard)
- Guess My Story: The Life and Opinions of Keith Andrew, Cricketer (2003)
- No Coward Soul: The Remarkable Story of Bob Appleyard (2003) (with Derek Hodgson)
- Ken Taylor: Drawn to Sport (2006)
- A Summer of Plenty: George Herbert Hirst in the Summer of 1906 (2006)
- Tom Cartwright: The Flame Still Burns (2007)
- Five Five Five: Holmes and Sutcliffe in 1932 (2007)
- The Way It Was: Glimpses of English Cricket's Past (2008)
- Now I'm 62: The Diary of an Ageing Cricketer (a novel) (2010)
- A Long Half Hour: Six Cricketers Remembered (2010)
- Micky Stewart and the Changing Face of Cricket (2012)
- Gentlemen, Gypsies and Jesters: The Wonderful World of Wandering Cricket (2013) (with Anthony Gibson)

Aakash Chopra

- Beyond the Blues: A First-Class Season Like No Other (2009)
- Out of the Blue: Rajasthan's Road to the Ranji Trophy (2011)

"A Country Vicar"

- Cricket Memories (1930)
- Second Innings (1933)
- The Happy Cricketer (1946)

Tony Cozier

- The West Indies: 50 Years of Test Cricket (1978 – foreword by Sir Garfield Sobers)

== D ==
Bernard Darwin

- Eton v Harrow at Lord's (1926)
- W. G. Grace (1934)

James Dance (a.k.a. James Love)

- Cricket, an Heroic Poem (1744)

William Denison

- Cricket
- Sketches of the Players (1846)

== E ==
W Epps

- A Collection of all the Grand Matches of Cricket 1771 to 1791 (1799)

== F ==
Nicholas Felix (Nicholas Wanostrocht)

- Felix on the Bat (1845)

Jack Fingleton

- Cricket Crisis (1947)
- Brightly Fades the Don (1949)
- Brown & Company (1951)
- The Ashes Crown the Year (1954)
- Masters of Cricket (1958)
- Four Chukkas to Australia (1960)
- The Greatest Test of All (1961)
- Fingleton on Cricket, London, Collins, 1972. (ISBN 0-00-211180-2)
- The Immortal Victor Trumper (1978)
- Batting from Memory (1981)

John Ford

- Cricket – A Social History 1700-1835 (1972)

Bill Frindall

- The Wisden Book of Test Cricket 1877-1978 (1979)

David Frith

- The Fast Men (1975)
- My Dear Victorious Stod (1977)
- The Golden Age of Cricket (1978)
- The Slow Men (1984)
- Archie Jackson (1987)
- Pageant of Cricket (1987)
- Silence of the Heart (1991)
- Bodyline Autopsy (2002)

== G ==
A. J. Gaston

- Sussex County Cricket 1728-1923 (1924)

Alan Gibson

- Jackson's Year: The Test Matches of 1905 (1966)
- Growing Up With Cricket – Some Memories of a Sporting Education (1985)
- The Cricket Captains of England (1979, revised edition 1989)
- Of Didcot and the Demon: The Cricketing Times of Alan Gibson (2009) (Compiled by Anthony Gibson)

William Godfrey – pseudonym of Samuel Youd for his novels about cricket

William Goldwin

- In Certamen Pilae ('On a ball game': i.e., a rural cricket match) (1706)

W. G. Grace

- Grace, W. G. (1891). Cricket. Bristol: J. W. Arrowsmith Ltd. OCLC 6588887. Ghost-written by W. Methven Brownlee. Also available at Cricket.
- Grace, W. G. (1980) [1899]. Cricketing Reminiscences and Personal Recollections. London: Hambledon Press. ISBN 978-0-9506-8820-6. Ghost-written by Arthur Porritt.
- Grace, W. G. (1895). The History of a Hundred Centuries. London: L. Upcott Gill. OCLC 220994522. Ghost-written by William Yardley.
- Grace, W. G. (1909). WG's Little Book. London: George Newnes Ltd. OCLC 156309114. Ghost-written by E. H. D. Sewell.

Peter Griffiths

- Padwick's Bibliography of Cricket, Volume 2, Compiled by Stephen Eley and Peter Griffiths, Library Association, 1991 (covers the period 1980–1990)

Ramachandra Guha

- Wickets in the East (1992)
- Spin and Other Turns (1994)
- An Indian Cricket Omnibus (ed. with TG Vaidyanathan) (1994)
- The Picador Book of Cricket (ed.) (2001)
- Guha, Ramachandra (2001). A Corner of a Foreign Field – An Indian History of a British Sport. London: Picador. ISBN 978-0-3304-9117-4.
- The States of Indian Cricket (2005)

== H ==
Gideon Haigh

- The Cricket War (1993). ISBN 9781472950635
- Mystery Spinner: The story of Jack Iverson, Melbourne, Text, 1999. (ISBN 1-876485-51-5)
- The Big Ship: Warwick Armstrong and the Making of Modern Cricket (2000)
- Game for Anything: Writings on Cricket (2004)
- Silent Revolutions: Writings on Cricket History (2006)
- The Green & Golden Age: Writings on Cricket (2007)

Duncan Hamilton

- Harold Larwood (2009)

Chris Harte

- A History of Australian Cricket (1993)
- The History of the Sheffield Shield (1987)

Fyzul Hassanali

- Captaincy in Cricket (2002) ISBN 976-8180-49-8
- Captain out, All Out (2004)

Arthur Haygarth

- Frederick Lillywhite's Cricket Scores and Biographies, published in 15 volumes between 1862 and 1879

Bernard Hollowood

- Cricket on the Brain (1970)

Gerald Howat

- Learie Constantine (1975)
- Village Cricket (1980),
- Cricketer Militant: the life of Jack Parsons (1980)
- Walter Hammond (1984)
- Plum Warner (1987)
- Len Hutton: The Biography (1988)
- Cricket's Second Golden Age: The Hammond-Bradman Years (1989)
- Cricket Medley (1993)
- Cricket All My Life (autobiography) (2006)

== J ==
C. L. R. James

- Beyond a Boundary (1963)

Douglas Jardine

- In Quest of the Ashes (1933)

== K ==
J. M. Kilburn

- In Search of Cricket (1937)
- The Scarborough Cricket Festival (1948)
- History of Yorkshire County Cricket 1924-1949 (1950)
- Yorkshire County Cricket (County Cricket Series) (1950)
- Len Hutton: The story of a great cricketer (1951)
- Cricket (Homes of Sport) (with Norman Yardley) (1952)
- Cricket Decade: England v. Australia 1946 to 1956 (1959)
- A Century of Yorkshire County Cricket (1963)
- A History of Yorkshire Cricket (1970)
- Thanks to Cricket (1973)
- Overthrows (1975)
- Sweet Summers: The Classic Cricket Writing of JM Kilburn: Edited by Duncan Hamilton (2008)

A. E. Knight

- The Complete Cricketer (1906)

== L ==
John Lazenby

- Test of Time, John Murray, 2005

Christopher Lee

- From the Sea End – Official History of Sussex CCC (1989)

David Lemmon

- The History of Surrey County Cricket Club (1989)

W J Lewis

- The Language of Cricket (1938)

E V Lucas

- The Hambledon Men (1907)

== M ==
Timothy J McCann

- Sussex Cricket in the Eighteenth Century (2004)

John Major

- More Than a Game: The Story of Cricket's Early Years (2007: HarperCollins, ISBN 978-0-00-718364-7)

Ashley Mallett

- Trumper: the illustrated biography, Melbourne, Macmillan, 1985. (ISBN 0-333-40088-7)

John Marshall

- A History of Sussex Cricket (1959)
- The Duke Who Was Cricket (1961)

G D Martineau

- Bat, Ball, Wicket and All (1954)
- The Field is Full of Shades (1954)
- They Made Cricket (1956)

Christopher Martin-Jenkins

- The Wisden Book of County Cricket (with Frank Warwick) (1981)
- Ball by Ball: The Story of Cricket Broadcasting (1990)

Ronald Mason

- Batsman's Paradise: An anatomy of cricketomania (1955)
- Jack Hobbs – A Portrait of an Artist as a Great Batsman (1960)
- Walter Hammond: A biography (1962)
- Sing All A Green Willow (1967)
- 'Plum' Warner's Last Season (1970)
- Warwick Armstrong's Australians (1973)
- Ashes in the Mouth: The Story of the Bodyline Tour of 1932-33 (1982)

Eric Midwinter

- WG Grace: His Life and Times (1981)
- 150 Years: Surrey Cricket Club 1845-1995 (1995)

Keith Miller

- Cricket Crossfire (1956)

Mary Russell Mitford

- Our Village (1832) (this collection of essays contains one on a village cricket match)

Geoffrey Moorhouse

- The Best Loved Game (1979)

Mahiyar Morawalla

- Cricket Cavalcade: Studies of Great Batsmen (1976)
- King of Kings: The Story of Sir Garfield Sobers (1981)

Patrick Morrah

- Alfred Mynn and the Cricketers of his Time (1986)

Ashley Mote

- The Glory Days of Cricket (1997)
- John Nyren's "The Cricketers of My Time" (1998)

Johnnie Moyes

- Australian Cricket: A History, Sydney, Angus & Robertson, 1959.

Sujit Mukherjee

- The Romance of Indian Cricket 1968
- Playing for India 1972
- Between Indian Wickets 1977
- Matched Winners 1996
- Autobiography of an Unknown Cricketer 1997
- An Indian Cricket Century: Selected Writings 2002

D.J. Mulvaney

- Cricket Walkabout: The Australian Aboriginal Cricketers on Tour 1867-8 (1967)

== N ==
William North

- Nottingham Old Club Match Scores (1832)

John Nyren

- The Young Cricketer's Tutor and the Cricketers of My Time (with Charles Cowden Clarke)(1833)

== P ==
E.W. Padwick

- A Bibliography of Cricket, Library Association, 1984 (2nd edition)
- Padwick's Bibliography of Cricket, Volume 2, Compiled by Stephen Eley and Peter Griffiths, Library Association, 1991 (covers the period 1980–1990)

J S Penny

- Cricket References in Norwich Newspapers 1701 – 1800 (year tbc)

Roland Perry

- The Don, Sydney, Pan Macmillan, 1995. (ISBN 0-7329-0827-2)

Playfair

- Playfair Cricket Annual (annually from 1948)

Jack Pollard

- Australian Cricket 5 volumes: The Formative Years, 1803–1893; The Turbulent Years, 1893–1917; The Bradman Years 1918–1948; The Packer Years, 1948–1995; Highest, Most and Best, 192 Years of Cricket Statistics. Sydney, The Book Company, 1995. (ISBN 1-86309-084-3)
- Australian Cricket: The game and the players. Sydney, Hodder & Stoughton, 1982. (ISBN 0-340-28796-9)
- Six and Out: The legend of Australian and New Zealand Cricket, 4th ed., North Sydney, Jack Pollard, 1973 (ISBN 0-909950-32-6)

James Pycroft

- The Cricket Field (1851)

== R ==
Simon Rae

- W.G. Grace: A Life (1998)

Vasant Raiji

- Ranji: The Legend and the Man (1963)
- L. P. Jai: Memories of a Great Batsman (edited) (1976)
- The Romance of the Ranji Trophy (1984)
- India's Hambledon Men (1986)
- CCI and the Brabourne Stadium, 1937-1987 (with Anandji Dossa) (1987)
- C. K. Nayudu: The Shahenshah of Indian Cricket (1989)
- Duleep: A Centenary Tribute (2005)
- From Presidency to Pentangular (with Mohandas Menon) (2006)

Netta Rheinberg

- Fair Play – the story of women's cricket (1976) – (with Rachael Heyhoe-Flint)

R. C. Robertson-Glasgow

- Cricket Prints – Some Batsmen and Bowlers (1920–1940) (1943)
- More Cricket Prints – Some Batsmen and Bowlers (1920–1945) (1948)
- 46 Not Out – an autobiography (1948)
- Rain Stopped Play (1948)
- The Brighter Side of Cricket (1950)
- All in the Game (1952)
- How To Become A Test Cricketer (1962)
- Crusoe on cricket: The cricket writings of R.C. Robertson-Glasgow (1966)

Ray Robinson

- Between Wickets (1946)
- The Glad Season (1955)
- The Wildest Tests (1972)
- On Top Down Under (1975)

Peter Roebuck

- Slices of Cricket Unwin, (1982) ISBN 0-04-796088-4, ISBN 978-0-04-796088-8
- It Never Rains: A Cricketer's Lot, Unwin, (1984) ISBN 0-04-796096-5; ISBN 978-0-04-796096-3;
- It Sort of Clicks, (with Ian Botham) (1986) ISBN 0-947072-32-2, ISBN 978-0-947072-32-2
- Great Innings, Blitz (1990) ISBN 1-85605-121-8, ISBN 978-1-85605-121-7
- Tangled Up in White: Peter Roebuck on Cricket, Hodder & Stoughton, (1992) ISBN 0-340-56618-3, ISBN 978-0-340-56618-3
- From Sammy to Jimmy: History of Somerset County Cricket Club, Partridge Press (1991) ISBN 1-85225-085-2, ISBN 978-1-85225-085-0
- Sometimes I Forgot to Laugh, (autobiography) Allen & Unwin (2004) ISBN 1-74114-389-6
- It Takes All Sorts: Celebrating Cricket's Colourful Characters, Allen & Unwin, (2005) ISBN 1-74114-542-2
- In It To Win It: The Australian Cricket Supremacy Allen & Unwin, (2006) ISBN 1-74114-543-0

Alan Ross

- Australia 55 (1955)
- Cape Summer and the Australians in England (1956)
- The Cricketer's Companion (editor) (1960)
- Through the Caribbean (1960)
- Australia 63 (1963)
- Ranji – Prince of Cricketers (1983)

Rowland Ryder

- Cricket Calling (1995)

== S ==
Keith A. P. Sandiford

- 100 Years of Organised Cricket in Barbados, 1892–1992 (1992; edited with Ronald Hughes and Carlisle Burton)
- Cricket Nurseries of Colonial Barbados: The Elite Schools, 1865–1966 (1998)
- Gary Sobers (1998)
- The Imperial Game: Cricket, Culture and Society (1998; edited with Brian Stoddart)

Hugh de Sélincourt

- The Cricket Match (a novel) (1924)

Gerard Siggins

- Green Days: Cricket in Ireland 1792-2005 (2005)
- 100 Greats of Irish Cricket (with James Fitzgerald, 2006)
- Raiders of the Caribbean: Ireland's World Cup adventure (with Trent Johnston, 2007)

HF & AP Squire

- Pre-Victorian Sussex Cricket (1951)

Richard Streeton

- PGH Fender: A Biography (1981)

JF Sutton

- Nottingham Cricket Matches from 1771 to 1853, Simpkin & Marshall, 1853

E W Swanton

- Elusive Victory (1951)
- Cricket and the Clock (1952)
- Best Cricket Stories (1953)
- West Indian Adventure 1953-1954 (1954)
- West Indies Revisited – MCC tour 1959-1960 (1960)
- Cricket from All Angles (1968)
- Sort of a Cricket Person (1972)
- Swanton in Australia with MCC 1946-1975 (1975)
- Follow On (1977)
- Barclays World of Cricket (General Editor) (1980 – 2nd ed.)
- As I Said at the Time – a Lifetime of Cricket (1983)
- Gubby Allen – Man of Cricket (1985)
- Kent Cricket – a Photographic History 1744-1984 (with C H Taylor) (1985)
- The Essential E W Swanton – the 1980s Observed (1990)
- Last Over – A Life in Cricket (1996)

== T ==
Percy Francis Thomas

- Old English Cricket (1929)

A. A. Thomson

- Cricket My Pleasure (1953)
- Cricket My Happiness (1954)
- Pavilioned in Splendour (1956)
- The Great Cricketer (a biography of Dr W G Grace) (1957 and 1968)
- Odd Men In (1958)
- Hirst and Rhodes (1959, 1986)
- Cricket Bouquet (1961)
- Cricket: The Golden Ages (1961)
- Hutton and Washbrook (1963)
- Cricket: The Great Captains (1965)
- Cricket: The Wars of the Roses (1967)
- Cricketers of My Times (1967)

Geoff Tibballs

- No-balls and Googlies (2007)

== U ==
David Underdown

- Start of Play (2000)

== W ==
H T Waghorn

- Cricket Scores 1730–1773 (1899)
- The Dawn of Cricket (1906)

P F Warner

- How we recovered the Ashes (1904)
- Cricket Between Two Wars (1942)
- Lord's 1787-1945 (1947)
- Long Innings (1951)
- Sir Pelham Warner's Book of Cricket (1945)

Steve Waugh

- Out of My Comfort Zone: the autobiography, Melbourne, Penguin, 2005. (ISBN 0-670-04198-X)

J R Webber

- The Chronicle of W.G. (1998)

Roy Webber

- The Playfair Book of Cricket Records, Playfair Books, 1951
- The Australians in England: A record of the 21 Australian cricket tours of England, 1878 to 1953 (1953)
- The County Cricket Championship: A history of the competition from 1873 to the present day (1957)
- Phoenix History of Cricket (1960)
- The Book of Cricket Records, Playfair Books, 1963 (concise edition)

Simon Wilde

- Ranji: A Genius Rich and Strange (1990)
- Letting Rip: The Fast Bowling Threat from Lillee to Waqar (1994)
- Number One: The World's Best Batsmen and Bowlers (1998)
- Caught: The Full Story of Corruption in International Cricket (2001)
- Shane Warne: Portrait of a Flawed Genius (2007)

Martin Wilson

- An Index to Waghorn (Bodyline Books, 2005)

John Wisden

- Wisden Cricketers' Almanack (annually from 1864)
- Wisden Cricketers' Almanack Australia
- The Wisden Cricketer – a monthly magazine
- Wisden Cricket Monthly – merged with The Cricketer to form The Wisden Cricketer
- Wisden Asia Cricket – (defunct)

John Woodcock

- The Times – One Hundred Greatest Cricketers (1998)

Graeme Wright

- Test Decade 1972-1982 (1982)
- A Wisden Collection (2004)
- Wisden at Lord's – An Illustrated Anthology (2005)

Peter Wynne-Thomas

- Hamlyn A-Z of Cricket Records (1983)
- Give Me Arthur (1985)
- From the Weald to the World (1997)

== Y ==
Graham Yallop

- Lambs to the Slaughter (1979)

Samuel Youd (writing as William Godfrey)

- Malleson at Melbourne (novel) (1956)
- The Friendly Game (fiction) (1957)
