= Cricket in film and television =

Depiction of Cricket in film and TV

Cricket has been a popular theme in films and television, often used to showcase drama, teamwork, and cultural significance. Many films, like Lagaan (2001) and Iqbal (2005), highlight cricket as a source of inspiration and struggle. TV shows and documentaries frequently explore the sport’s history, legendary players, and behind-the-scenes stories. Reality shows and biopics, such as MS Dhoni: The Untold Story (2016) and Inside Edge (2017), bring the game to a wider audience, blending entertainment with the passion of cricket.

== Documentaries ==
- Prince Ranjitsinhji Practising Batting in the Nets (1897) (Australia)
- Trobriand Cricket: An Ingenious Response to Colonialism (1976) (Australia/Papua New Guinea)
- The Australian Cricket Collection (Cricket History Series) (2002–2006) (Australia)
  - Cricket in the 50s: Discovering New Boundaries (2002–2006) (Australia)
  - Cricket in the 60s: Windows of Change (2002–2006) (Australia)
  - Cricket in the 70s: Chappell Era (2002–2006) (2parts; Australia)
  - Cricket in the 80s: Rookies, Rebels and Renaissance (2002–2006) (2 parts; Australia)
- Not Cricket: The Basil d'Oliveira Conspiracy (2004) (UK)
- Cricket and the Meaning of Life (2005) (Canada)
- Breaking Boundaries (2008) (Ireland)
- Out of the Ashes (2010) (UK/Afghanistan)
- Fire in Babylon (2010) (UK)
- From the Ashes (2011) (UK)
- Cricket Nation (2012) (Canada)
- Cricket & Parc Ex: A Love Story (2015) (Canada)
- Beyond All Boundaries (2014) (USA/India)
- Death of a Gentleman (2015) (UK)
- Sachin: A Billion Dreams (2017) (India)

== Films ==
- It's Not Cricket (1949) (UK)
- The Final Test (1953) (UK)
- The Shout (1978) (UK)
- Outside Edge (1982) (UK)
- P'tang, Yang, Kipperbang (1982) (UK)
- Arthur's Hallowed Ground (1984) (UK)
- Playing Away (1987) (UK)
- Awwal Number (1990) (India)
- Lagaan: Once Upon a Time in India (2001) (India)
- I Love You Da (2002) (India)
- Stumped (2003) (India)
- Wondrous Oblivion (2003) (UK)
- Iqbal (2005) (India)
- Chennai 600028 (2007) (India)
- Chain Kulii Ki Main Kulii (2007) (India)
- Say Salaam India (2007) (India)
- Hit for Six (2009) (Barbados)
- Meerabai Not Out (2008) (India)
- Jannat (2008) (India)
- Hansie (2008) (South Africa)
- Victory (2009) (India)
- World Cupp 2011 (2009) (India)
- 99 (2009) (India)
- Dil Bole Hadippa! (2009) (India)
- Le Chakka (2010) (India)
- Patiala House (2011) (India)
- Sinhawalokanaya (2011) (Sri Lanka)
- Golconda High School (2011) (India)
- Potta Potti (2011) (India)
- Dhoni (2012) (India)
- Ferrari Ki Sawaari (2012) (India)
- Main Hoon Shahid Afridi (2013) (Pakistan)
- 1983 (2014) (India)
- Jeeva (2014) (India)
- Bangalore 560023 (2015) (India)
- Azhar (2016) (India)
- M.S. Dhoni: The Untold Story (2016) (India)
- Chennai 600028 II (2016) (India)
- 22 Yards (2018) (India)
- Kanaa (2018) (India)
- Son of Manjeet Singh (2018) (India)
- The Zoya Factor (2019) (India)
- Jersey (2019) (India)
- Majili (2019) (India)
- 83 (2021) (India)
- Kaun Pravin Tambe? (2022) (India)
- Jersey (2022) (India)
- Shabaash Mithu (2022) (India)
- Kacchey Limbu (2022) (India)
- 800 (2023) (India)
- Ghoomer (2023) (India)
- Hukus Bukus (2023) (India)
- Lal Salam (2024) (India)
- Mr. & Mrs. Mahi (2024) (India)
- Lubber Pandhu (2024) (India)

== TV series ==
- The Magnificent Six and a Half – episode: It's Not Cricket (1969) (UK)
- Dad's Army – episode 4.10: The Test (1970) (UK)
- All Creatures Great and Small – episode 2.9: The Name of the Game (1978) (UK)
- Doctor Who – Black Orchid (1982) (UK)
- Bodyline: It's Not Just Cricket (1984) (Australia)
- Ever Decreasing Circles – episode 2.2: The Cricket Match (1984) (UK)
- Malgudi Days – episodes: various (1986) (India)
- Inspector Morse – episode: Deceived by Flight (1989) (UK)
- Duck Tales – episode 1.51 – Take Me Out of the Ballgame (Duckworth mistakes Baseball for Cricket) (1987) (USA)
- Grace & Favour – episode 2.2: "The Cricket Match" (1993) (UK)
- Outside Edge (a UK sitcom based on the stage play of the same name) (1994–1996) (UK)
- Gower's Cricket Monthly (1995–1998) (UK)
- Champion (1998–1999) (India)
- Sports Night – episode: 1.21 Ten Wickets (1999) (USA)
- Midsomer Murders – episodes 2.3: "Dead Man's Eleven" (1999), 19.3: "Last Man Out" (2017) (UK)
- The Inspector Lynley Mysteries – episode 2.1: Playing for the Ashes (2002) (UK)
- An Aussie Goes Barmy (2006) (Australia)
- Cricket Star (2006–2007) (India)
- Champions of the World (2007–2008) (India)
- Jersey No. 10 (2007–2008) (India)
- Extraaa Innings T20 (2008–2017) (India)
- An Aussie Goes Bolly (2008) (Australia)
- Taarak Mehta Ka Ooltah Chashmah (A fictional cricket tournament "Gokuldham Premiere League" takes place in the series) (2008–2014) (India)
- Empire of Cricket (2009) (UK)
- Knights and Angels (2009) (India)
- Best of Luck Nikki – episode 1.3: Narendra Tauji – A Cricket Freak (2011) (India)
- Howzat! Kerry Packer's War (2012) (Australia)
- The Suite Life of Karan & Kabir – episode 1.15: Big Hair & Cricket (2012) (India)
- Downton Abbey – episode 3.8 (2012) (UK)
- Suraj: The Rising Star (2012–2013) (India)
- Howzzattt (2013) (India)
- Father Brown (2013 TV series) – episode 3.5: "The Last Man" (2015) (UK)
- Sumit Sambhal Lega (2015–2016) (India)
- Mid Wicket Tales (2015–2016) (India)
- Tamanna (2016) (India)
- ICC Cricket 360° (2016–present) (USA)
- Inside Edge (2017–present) (India)
- The Night Watchmen (2018–present) (Australia)
- Bluey (2018–present, Australia) – Series 3, Episode 47 "Cricket" (2023)
- Jio Dhan Dhana Dhan (2018) (India)
- Selection Day (2018–2019) (India)
- Cricket Fever: Mumbai Indians (2019) (India)
- Roar of The Lion (2019) (India)
- The Test (2020–2024) (Australia)
- Inside Story: A Season With Rajasthan Royals (2020) (India)
- Bandon Mein Tha Dum (2022) (India)
- Baarwan Khiladi (2022) (Pakistan)
- Sixer (2022) (India)
- The Greatest Rivalry: India vs Pakistan (2025) (India)

== Indoor cricket ==
- Full Toss (2004–2005) (India)
- Box Cricket League (2014–2019) (India)
- Box Cricket League - Punjab (BCL Punjab) (2016) (India)

== See also ==
- Cricket in fiction
- Poetry about cricket
