= Poetry about cricket =

Sports-themed poems

The game of cricket has inspired much poetry, most of which romanticises the sport and its culture.

== Poems ==
The first known poem about cricket was written in Latin hexameters, by the Bristol schoolmaster William Goldwyn in 1704. Notable authors and poets who created poetry about cricket include William Blake, Lord Byron, Lewis Carroll, G. K. Chesterton, Harry Farjeon, Henry Newbolt, Harold Pinter, and Siegfried Sassoon.

The poem "Cricket: An Heroic Poem" by James Love is too long to quote in full; above are its opening two lines. It describes a match in 1744 between Kent and England. It is written in rhyming couplets. According to H.S. Altham, it "should be in every cricket lover's library" and "his description of the game goes with a rare swing". The poem is the first substantial piece of literature about cricket.

Not long before his death and long after he had watched Hornby and Barlow bat at Old Trafford, Francis Thompson was invited to watch Lancashire play Middlesex at Lord's. As the day of the match grew closer, Thompson became increasingly nostalgic. At the end, he did not go for the match, but sat at home and wrote "At Lord's". The original match in 1878 ended in a draw, with Gloucestershire needing 111 to win with five wickets in hand, Grace 58*. The first stanza of the poem has contributed the titles of at least three books on cricket: G. D. Martineau's The field is full of shades, Eric Midwinter's history of Lancashire cricket Red roses crest the caps, R. H. Young's Field Full of Shades. A personal history of Claverham (Yatton) Cricket Club. The first stanza is also quoted in full by Count Bronowsky in Paul Scott's Raj Quartet novel The Day of the Scorpion.

The satirical magazine Punch printed a poem following a particularly slow and boring innings by William Scotton. It mimicked Tennyson's "Break, break, break".

When Alfred Mynn died in 1861, William Jeffrey Prowse penned a poem in his memory. An early Australian cricket ballad is 'How M’Dougal Topped the Score' by Thos. E. Spencer published in The Bulletin, 12 March 1898, and reprinted numerous times. The Australian poet Les Murray wrote "The Aboriginal Cricketer". One of the most famous pieces of nostalgic rose-tinted poems is "Vitaï Lampada" by Sir Henry Newbolt. The very short "A Cricket Poem" by Harold Pinter encapsulates the mood and nostalgia common to lovers of cricket. Roy Harper penned a poem for English cricketer Graeme Fowler's benefit event, "Three Hundred Words". Australian poet Damian Balassone often employs cricket themes, such as in the poem "Strange Dismissal", which appears in Quadrant magazine.

Cricket features, albeit briefly, in late-Victorian poet A. E. Housman's most famous collection of somewhat gloomy poems A Shropshire Lad, published in 1896, including "Poem XVII". Poet Alan Ross wrote the poem "Test Match At Lord's". Herbert Farjeon wrote the poem "The Old Pavilion Bell". Norman Gale published several collections on cricket: Cricket Songs (1894), More Cricket Songs (1905), Messrs Bat and Ball (1930), and Close of Play (1936). Ted Hughes, Simon Rae, Hugo Williams, John Arlott and Simon Armitage have written cricket poems.

In 2006 poet SJ Litherland published a collection of poems about former England captain Nasser Hussain titled The Homage. The book was nominated for Cricket Book of the Year in 2007.

A Cricket Poetry Award started in 2009 has been run in Australia. Andy Kissane's "The Catch" won the inaugural award. "Boxing Day Test" by Cecilia White won the award for 2011.

Australian poet Nick Whittock writes avant-garde cricket poetry and has published several volumes.

== Verses and songs ==
At Lord's in 1950, the West Indies defeated England in England for the first time. Egbert Moore, who sang under the pseudonym Lord Beginner, popularized the most famous of cricketing calypsos to celebrate the occasion. He was accompanied by Calypso Rhythm Kings, "supervision" by Denis Preston. It was recorded on the Melodisc (1133) label (MEL 20). The song was originally composed by Lord Kitchener. "The Victory Calypso" also immortalised the spin bowling pair of Sonny Ramadhin and Alf Valentine. Lord Kitchener also wrote "The Ashes" about Australia vs MCC 1954-55.

Lord Relator (born Willard Harris) wrote the "Gavaskar Calypso" to celebrate Gavaskar's first Test series, in West Indies in 1970–71. This was voted at No. 68 at a "Calypso of the Century" poll (although "Victory Calypso" did not feature in the list).

"Dreadlock Holiday" is probably the most well-known pop song to mention cricket. 10cc's hit single reached number 1 in the UK in 1978. However, the song has only a tenuous connection with cricket, mentioning it in the chorus: "I don't like cricket, oh no, I love it". The group The Duckworth Lewis Method have released two concept albums about cricket, entitled The Duckworth Lewis Method and Sticky Wickets. Paul Kelly penned "Bradman" in Australia. In 1985 Half Man Half Biscuit released the cricket-related song on an English cricketer, 'Fuckin’ ’Ell It’s Fred Titmus' from Back in the D.H.S.S.

In New Zealand the prolific songwriter Jim Tocker published Songs of a Cricketer in 1999. Tim Finn and the Record Partnership released a single through Epic "Runs in the Family" for the NZ Cricket Council Centenary in 1995.

== Anthologies and Collections ==
- The Cricket Match: A Poem, in Two Cantos by Copthall Chambers (Such, 1859)
- Cricket Songs by Norman Gale (Methuen, 1894)
- Crickety Cricket – A Collection of Cricketing Poetry and Caricature by Douglas Moffat (Longmans, Green, 1898)
- Cricket Rhymes by Century (Cricket Press, 1899)
- Poems by Rev. Francis de Lacy White (H J Pascoe, 1903). Includes a poem ‘On Cricket’ dedicated to W G Grace.
- Cricket Poems by George Francis Wilson (Simpkin, Marshall, Hamilton, Kent, 1905)
- More Cricket Songs by Norman Gale (Alston Rivers, 1905)
- How M’Dougall Topped the Score and other verses by Thomas E Spencer (Bookstall, 1908)
- A Few Overs by D L A Jephson (W Heffer, 1913)
- Cricket: An Heroic Poem by James Love (C H Richards, 1922)
- For the Luncheon Interval by A. A. Milne (1925). Poems from The Punch.
- A Cricket Eleven: An Anthology of Cricket Short Stories with Verses (Gerald Howe, 1927)
- Messrs. Bat and Ball by Norman Gale (The Author, 1930)
- Close of Play by Norman Gale (George Over, 1936)
- The Book of Cricket Verse, edited by Gerald Brodribb (Rupert Hart-Davis, 1953)
- The Cricketer’s Companion edited by Alan Ross (Eyre & Spottiswoode, 1960, 2nd edition, Eyre Methuen, 1979). Includes a section on Poetry.
- The Poetry of Cricket, edited by Leslie Frewin (Macdonald, 1964)
- Six and Out: The Legend of Australian and New Zealand Cricket edited by Jack Pollard (Christchurch, Whitcombe & Tombs, 1964). Includes poems.
- Contrasts, by John Snow (Fuller d'Arch Smith Limited, 1971).
- Moments and Thoughts, by John Snow (Kaye & Ward Ltd., 1973)
- Five Overs and Two Wides by H S Vere Hodge (Privately printed, 1975)
- The Longest Game. A Collection of the Best Cricket Writing from Alexander to Zavos, from the Gabba to the Yabba edited by Alexander Buso and Jamie Grant (Heinemann, Australia, 1990). Includes poems.
- 22 Cricket Poems by Colin Shakespeare (Oak, 1996)
- Man in the Long Grass by David Phillips (Iron Press, 2001)
- A Breathless Hush: The MCC Anthology of Cricket Verse, by Hubert Doggart and David Rayvern Allen (2004)
- Covers by Nick Whittock (COD, Australia, 2004).
- Australian Cricket Poems by Philip R Rush (Glen Huon, Tasmania, 2006). Foreword by David Boon.
- The Homage by S J Litherland (Iron Press, 2006)
- Come Shane, by Victoria Coverdale (Make Jam Press, 2006) ISBN 0-9802963-0-7. A poetic tribute to Shane Warne from a female admirer and how her world changed when "that" ball was delivered.
- Tasmanian Tigers: Season 2005/06 and Season 2006/07 by Philip R Rush (Self published, c2006, 2007)
- A Tingling Catch: A Century of New Zealand Cricket Poems 1864–2009, edited by Mark Pirie (Wellington, N.Z.: HeadworX Publishers, 2010). ISBN 978-0-473-16872-8. First anthology of New Zealand cricket poems.
- The Bowling was Superfine: West Indian Writing and West Indian Cricket, edited by Ian McDonald and Stewart Brown (Peepal Tree Pr Ltd, 2012). Includes poems.
- The Doon by Nick Whittock (Vagabond Press, Sydney, Australia, 2012).
- Cricket Poetry, Volume 1 by Arthur Salway (2013)
- The Shane Warne Poetry Book by Victoria Coverdale (Book Baby, 2014). A fictional character Victoria Coverdale created by author Annabel Tellis.
- Cricket’s Bounty by Hubert Doggart (Phillimore Book Publishing in association with M.C.C., 2014). Reminiscences, written between 1956 and 2014, in Prose and Verse on Cricket and Cricketers (with Six ‘Extras’).
- Cautionary Tales from the Pavilion: A Short Collection of Verse, by Gascard Drew (2014)
- Hows Its, by Nick Whittock (Inken Publish, 2014). ISBN 978-0-987-14232-0
- Leg Avant: The New Poetry of Cricket, edited by Richard Parker (Crater Press, 2016)
- Watson Era by Nick Whittock (Crater Press, 2016).
- Ten Poems About Cricket selected and introduced by John Lucas (Candlestick Press, 2016)
- Cricket in Verse by Peter Fenton (The Cricket Press, Australia, 2017)
- Less Cautionary Tales from the Pavilion: A Slightly Longer Collection of Verse by Gascard Drew (2020)
- Slips: Cricket Poems by Mark Pirie (Wellington, N.Z.: HeadworX Publishers, 2021). An anthology of New Zealand poet Mark Pirie's cricket writings from 1994-2021.
- Cricket in Poetry: Run-Stealers, Gatlings and Graces by Bob Doran (Pitch Publishing Ltd, 2024).
- Cricket in Poetry: A Tribute to Cricket Legends by Rasid Saiyad (Independently published, 2024), A collection of tributes to Indian, English and Australian cricketers.
- Catching the Light: A New Anthology of Cricket Poetry, edited by Nicholas Hogg and Tim Beard (UK: Fairfield Books, 2026).
- Poets XI compiled by Mark Pirie (Paekakariki, N.Z.: Earl of Seacliff Art Workshop, 2026). Includes poems and unusual cricket XIs.

== See also ==
- Cricket in fiction
- Cricket in film and television
