= More than a Game (disambiguation) =

More than a Game is a 2008 American sports documentary film.

More than a Game may also refer to:

- More than a Game (soundtrack), the soundtrack album from the 2008 film
- "More Than a Game" (Towe Jaarnek and Peter Jöback song), 1992 song written for the 1992 UEFA European Championship
- "More Than a Game" (Chris Doheny song), 1994 theme song to the Nine Network's program The Footy Show
- More Than a Game: The Story of Cricket's Early Years, 2007 book
- More Than A Game: Living with the Old Firm, 2020 book by Archie Macpherson
