= Macdonald Hastings =

English journalist, author and war correspondent

Douglas Edward Macdonald Hastings (6 October 1909 – 4 October 1982), known as Macdonald Hastings or Mac Hastings, was an English journalist, author and war correspondent. He wrote for Lilliput magazine under the pseudonym Lemuel Gulliver.

== Early life and education ==
Hastings was born on 6 October 1909 in Camberwell, London, the son of Wilhelmina Harriet (née White) and Basil Macdonald Hastings, a journalist and playwright. Aged seven, he was sent to Stonyhurst, a Jesuit public school which his father and grandfather also attended.

At one point he contracted pneumonia, but his troubles went greatly unnoticed. The school matron reportedly waved him off and ignored the issue while a priest gave him the last rites.

== Career ==
Hastings's father died at age 46, leaving young "Mac" and his mother essentially poor. He returned home from school, no longer able to pay for his tuition.

Despite offers from family friends such as Lord Beaverbrook and Edgar Wallace who wished to help him complete his schooling, Hastings refused and went in search of work to support himself and his mother. He worked briefly as a clerk at Scotland Yard, but disliked the position. After several months, he moved on to J. Lyons, a catering company where he worked in the publicity department and remained for the next nine years.

While working at Lyons, Hastings began to branch out, writing journalistic pieces and freelancing them to various news corporations, including the BBC. After nine years at Lyons, he left to pursue freelance journalism.

== News career ==
His career took off in 1939 when he was hired by Picture Post, a magazine known for on location reporting and live-action photography. During World War II, he was a reporter for the magazine, embedded in torpedo boats to Channel convoys. He notably covered Operation Overlord, earning a reputation simultaneously for courage and for rashness.

Hastings edited The Strand Magazine from 1945 until its closure in 1950, when he became a freelance journalist again. Over the next ten years or so, he wrote many articles, ten novels, and broadcast with the BBC.

Hastings was an occasional contributor to the literary magazine Lilliput, for which he wrote fiction under the pseudonym Lemuel Gulliver. In 1951 after the closure of Strand Magazine he was recruited by an Anglican priest, Marcus Morris, to write for a new boys' comic, The Eagle. He filed reports from far-flung parts of the world under the title of Eagle Special Correspondent reportedly making around 5,000 pounds a year by 1952, Hastings was doing very well for himself and his family. He was a co-founder/editor of the monthly journal Country Fair with A. G. Street, which ran until 1962.

He wrote around thirty books, was author of a series of detective novels and appeared on television as a weekly correspondent on Tonight in the late 1950s and early 1960s. He wrote and narrated the 1964 police procedural series Call the Gun Expert on BBC 1.

== Personal life ==
Aged 26, he briefly married Eleanor Asprey, aged 32. Despite the brevity of the marriage, he was required to pay his ex-wife maintenance for nearly the rest of his life.

In 1944, he married journalist and later women's editor of Picture Post, Anne Scott-James. They had two children: Max and Clare. Max followed in the footsteps of his father and grandfather as a journalist as did Clare initially before becoming an author. Macdonald and Anne Hastings divorced in 1963.

The same year, he married the daughter of Lord Hodson, influential publisher Anthea Joseph, who died in 1981. They had one daughter, Harriet, who became founder and managing director of Biscuiteers.

Macdonald Hastings described himself as a "lapsed" Catholic but added that "[S]aintly men and women in my family outnumber the sinners." He recalled that his great grandfather had taught in the Jesuit foundation at Georgetown, Virginia. Two brothers of his great great maternal grandmother were also Jesuits in the United States. His favourite uncle, Major Lewis Hastings, MC, was there, too, and also contributed to the other family tradition as a famous BBC military commentator in World War II.

He died at his home in Old Basing near Basingstoke, Hampshire in 1982.

== Selected publications ==
=== Books ===
- Hastings, Macdonald (1941). Passed as Censored: The War-time Experiences of Macdonald Hastings. London: G. G. Harrap & Co.
- Hastings, Macdonald (1951). Cork on the Water. London: Michael Joseph.
- Hastings, Macdonald (1955). Adventure Calling: The Further Adventures of M. Hastings, etc. London: Hulton Press.
- Hastings, Macdonald (1961). Macdonald Hastings' Country Book: A Personal Anthology. London: George Newnes.
- Hastings, Macdonald (1963). The Other Mr. Churchill: A Lifetime of Shooting and Murder. London: G. G. Harrap & Co.
- Gay, John & Hastings, Macdonald (1964). London Observed. London: Michael Joseph.
- Hastings, Macdonald (1971). Jesuit Child. London: Michael Joseph. ISBN 0718108345.
- Hastings, Macdonald (1972). Mary Celeste: A Centenary Record. London: Joseph. ISBN 0718110242.
