= Anthea Joseph =

British publisher

The Honourable Anthea Joseph
- Born: Anthea Esther Hodson; 6 March 1924; London, England
- Died: 23 January 1981 (aged 56); Old Basing, Hampshire, England
- Other names: Anthea Hastings
- Occupation: Publisher
- Spouses: Michael Joseph (m. 1950; died 1958) Macdonald Hastings (m. 1963)
- Children: 3

Anthea Esther Joseph (née Hodson; 6 March 1924 – 23 January 1981), also known by her second married name Hastings, was a British publisher.

== Life ==
Anthea Joseph was born in London as Anthea Esther Hodson, daughter of Charles and Susan Hodson. During the war, she was employed at the American Embassy.

She married the recently widowed publisher Michael Joseph in 1946 who had been her employer. For eight years she was mother to his four children and two of their own until her husband died.

Joseph started to run the publishing business although her primary interest was not profit. She wanted to publish books even those that might not be financially profitable. It was she who phoned Alfred Wight to tell him that they would publish his books. Wight was not allowed to use his name and chose the name, James Herriot, for his popular books. Authors that were also popular were Miss Read, James Baldwin, Stan Barstow, H. E. Bates, Dick Francis, Barry Hines, Julian Rathbone and Alun Richards. Joseph made sure that profits were set aside for other authors.

In 1962, Anthea Joseph became deputy chairman of the publishing business. She remarried the following year and had another daughter. Her new husband was Macdonald Hastings and her step-children now included Max Hastings. She became chairman in 1978 of Michael Joseph Ltd.

== Death ==
Joseph died on 23 January 1981, aged 56, of cancer, at Brown's Farm in Old Basing.
