= The Unquiet Ones =

Book about cricket in Pakistan

The Unquiet Ones: A History of Pakistan Cricket
- Author: Osman Samiuddin
- Publisher: HarperCollins India
- Publication date: 25 November 2014
- Pages: 510
- ISBN: 978-9350298015

The Unquiet Ones: A History of Pakistan Cricket is a book written by Pakistani sports journalist Osman Samiuddin. The book was published by HarperCollins India and released on 25 November 2014. In 2015, the book was shortlisted for the 'Book of the Year' award by the Cricket Writers' Club.

== Content ==
The book details the story of Pakistan cricket; how the game transformed from an urban, exclusive sport into a force uniting millions in a vast, disparate country. The book has five sections which contain thirty-one essays, with each section covering distinct eras of varying lengths of time. Each section starts with a match that is used to define that era, and includes essays on a maximum two players who were similarly definitive. The ultimate section covers the last 22 years, from 1992 to early 2014.

== Reception ==
A reviewer for ESPNcricinfo stated that "this book on cricket comes across as one of the most authentic and authoritative depictions of what the country is actually like." He described it as a "superbly researched book", while criticizing "the complete absence of any discussion of the women's game." The reviewer rated the book 4.5/5, writing that the book is "highly recommended".

A reviewer for Wisden India called the book an "ode to Pakistan cricket". He further stated that "the 500-odd page tribute to Pakistan cricket is more than the sum of its research material – it's no mere quizzer-goldmine". He adds that "the book deserved a bigger title to match its scale".

A reviewer for Express Tribune called the book "a triumph" while stating that "the research – let us call it scholarship – is immense". A reviewer for DNA India praised the "extensive research". He further added that Samiuddin "keeps the reader glued to his book" while praising him metaphorically for "a well-crafted century on debut".

A reviewer for New Statesman calls the book "magnificent as stand-alone history of Pakistan cricket". Nadeem F. Paracha, a cultural critic writing for Dawn calls the book "a knowledgeable fan's history of Pakistan cricket" and "a youthful celebration of a wildly impulsive cricketing culture".

== See also ==
- Cricket in Pakistan
- History of cricket
- Wisden Cricketers' Almanack
- Cricket literature
