= Anne Scott-James =

British journalist and author (1913–2009)

Anne Scott-James

Anne Eleanor Scott-James, Lady Lancaster (5 April 1913 – 13 May 2009) was a British journalist and author. She was one of Britain's first female career journalists, editors and columnists, and latterly author of a series of gardening books.

== Biography ==
She was born in Bayswater, London in 1913. Her father was the Liberal journalist and literary critic R. A. Scott-James, later editor of the London Mercury; her mother was also a journalist. She was educated at St Paul's Girls' School and Somerville College, Oxford. She gained a First in Honour Moderations but did not complete her degree. She joined the staff of Vogue in 1934, initially as a secretary, but quickly advanced to become a columnist, and latterly, Beauty Editor. In 1939, she married the editor and publisher Derek Verschoyle, but they soon divorced. On the outbreak of war, she joined the staff of Picture Post and was its Women's Editor from 1941 to 1945. While at Picture Post, she met and married the journalist Macdonald Hastings. They had two children, one of whom is Sir Max Hastings, the journalist and former editor of The Daily Telegraph. Her daughter, Clare Hastings, is the author of The House in Little Chelsea and a gardening book Gardening Notes from a Late Bloomer.

From 1945 to 1951, Scott-James was the editor of the British Harper's Bazaar, during which time she commissioned work from such individuals as Cecil Beaton, John Betjeman and Elizabeth David. Her novel In the Mink was published in 1952. She became Woman's Editor for the Sunday Express (1953–57) and columnist for the Daily Mail (1960–68). In 1964 she succeeded Nancy Spain as a panellist on the BBC radio panel game, My Word!. She herself was succeeded by Lady Antonia Fraser in 1978. Her marriage to Macdonald Hastings ended in 1963, and she soon met the writer and illustrator Osbert Lancaster. They were married from 1967 until his death in 1986.

In the late 1960s, she left the world of journalism and embarked on a new stage in her career, gardening writing. Her books, The Pleasure Garden (jointly written with Lancaster), Down to Earth, and Sissinghurst: The Making of a Garden, are regarded as classics of their genre.

Scott-James died aged 96, and was survived by her son and daughter, and stepson and stepdaughter by Sir Osbert Lancaster.

== Bibliography ==
- In the Mink (1952) (novel)
- Down to Earth (with Sir Osbert Lancaster) (1971)
- Sissinghurst: The Making of a Garden (1974)
- The Pleasure Garden: An Illustrated History of British Gardening (with Sir Osbert Lancaster) (1977)
- The Cottage Garden (1981)
- Glyndebourne: The Gardens (with Christopher Lloyd) (1983)
- Perfect Plant, Perfect Garden (1987)
- Gardening Letters to my Daughter (1991)
