= Rolfe Arnold Scott-James =

British journalist

Rolfe Arnold Scott-James OBE (birth registered as Rolfe Arnold S James, 21 December 1878 – 3 November 1959) was a British journalist, editor and literary critic. He is often cited as one of the first people to use the word "modernism" in his 1908 book Modernism and Romance, in which he writes, "there are characteristics of modern life in general which can only be summed up, as Mr. Thomas Hardy and others have summed them up, by the word, modernism" (p. ix).

== Biography ==
Scott-James was educated under the surname James at Brasenose College, Oxford, and graduated in 1901. The Dictionary of National Biography states that Scott-James "possessed a strongly developed social conscience: this manifested itself at many different points in his career in activities which, if distinct from his literary gifts, at the same time enriched them" (872). His surname was recorded as James at the time of his marriage on 26 November 1905 to Violet Eleonor Brooks. His daughter, Violet Marie Livia born in July 1906 was registered with the surname Scott-James, as were subsequent children. In 1914, Scott-James, then a close friend of Wyndham Lewis, became the editor of the New Weekly, which did not survive the outbreak of war later that year. During the war, Scott-James enlisted in the Royal Garrison Artillery and fought in France, and by the end of the war he had risen to the rank of Captain and in 1918 was awarded the Military Cross.

In 1934, Scott-James took over the editorship of the influential magazine, the London Mercury from J. C. Squire, in which he published many canonically recognized authors of modernism. The last issue of the London Mercury in April 1939 contained W. H. Auden's "In Memory of W. B. Yeats."

In 1955 he was made an Officer of the Order of the British Empire.

His daughter Anne Scott-James also became a prominent journalist. The military historian Max Hastings is his grandson.

== Editorships and literary positions ==
- Literary editor, Daily News, London (1902–1912)
- New Weekly, London (1914)
- Lead-Writer, the Daily Chronicle, London (1919–1930)
- Assistant editor, the Spectator, London (1933-1935; 1939-1945)
- London Mercury, London (1934–1939)
- Britain To-day (1940–1954)

== Bibliography ==
- 1908: Modernism and Romance. New York and London: John Lane
- 1910: An Englishman in Ireland: Impressions of a Journey in a Canoe by River, Lough and Canal
- 1913: The Influence of the Press
- 1913: Personality in Literature
- 1928: The Making of Literature: Some Principles of Criticism Examined in the Light of Ancient and Modern Theory. New York: Holt and Company
- 1947: The Day Before Yesterday London: Frederick Muller Ltd.
- 1951: Thomas Hardy Short Study
- 1951: Fifty Years of English Literature, 1900-1950
- 1955: Lytton Strachey Short Study
