= Vietnam: An Epic Tragedy =

2018 book by Max Hastings

Vietnam: An Epic Tragedy, 1945–1975
- Author: Max Hastings
- Cover artist: Milan Bozic
- Language: English
- Genre: Nonfiction
- Publisher: Harper Collins
- Publication date: October 16, 2018
- Publication place: United States
- Pages: 857
- ISBN: 978-0-06-240566-1

Vietnam: An Epic Tragedy, 1945–1975 is a 2018 nonfiction book by the British journalist and military historian Max Hastings. The author recounts the beginnings of the First Indochina War up until the end of The Vietnam War.

== Overview ==
Hastings recounts the Vietnam War from supposedly multiple perspectives ranging from military to political to civilian to American, North Vietnamese, South Vietnamese, Australian, Chinese, and Soviet.

== Reception ==
The New York Times and The Guardian published positive reviews. Lawrence Freedman in Foreign Affairs described Hastings as being acutely critical of the United States' decision to compensate for South Vietnam's political weaknesses through military means, yet also equally scathing in detailing the North Vietnamese and the Viet Cong. The Washington Post featured a review by historian Pierre Asselin that leaned slightly negative overall.
