= Hugh de Sélincourt =

English author and journalist

- Born: 15 June 1878; Hampstead, London, England
- Died: 20 January 1951 (aged 72); Pulborough, Sussex
- Occupation: Writer (novelist)
- Writing career
- Period: 20th century
- Genre: Fiction

Hugh de Sélincourt (15 June 1878 – 20 January 1951) was an English author and journalist, chiefly remembered today for his timeless tale of village cricket, The Cricket Match (1924).

== Biography ==
De Sélincourt was born in Hampstead, a suburb of north London. His parents were Charles Alexandre De Sélincourt and Theodora Bruce Bendall. He was the youngest son of 11 children, among them Ernest and Agnes. He studied at Dulwich College before going on to University College, Oxford. During the 1910s, he worked as a journalist, initially as drama critic of the Star and later as literary critic of the Observer. He continued to write book reviews for the Observer long after quitting his official post in 1914.

He had also published a few light-hearted novels – the first of these, A Boy's Marriage, came out in 1907 – but after World War I broke out, his literary output took on a more serious note. As war ended in 1918, his writings too resumed their former gaiety, in novels such as Young Mischief and Young 'Un. In 1924, The Cricket Match was published. This novel stands alongside A. G. Macdonell's England, Their England as one of the classic accounts of village cricket in English literature. The fictional village of Tillingfold was a recurring element in de Selincourt's work, and was based on his own village of Storrington at the foot of the South Downs.

In the immediate postwar years, Hugh and his wife Janet, lived at Sand Pit, a lush house in Sussex and had an open marriage. A close friend of Havelock Ellis, de Selincourt met Ellis's close friend, Margaret Sanger in 1920 and began an affair with her. When that ended he began an affair with Ellis's companion, Francoise Lafitte Cyon, which ended his friendship with Ellis.

The Saturday Match (1937) and Gauvinier Takes to Bowls (1948) were among de Selincourt's final books. He died in his home in Pulborough, Sussex at the age of 72. His widow Janet died in 1955.

== Works ==
- A Boy's Marriage, (1907)
- The Strongest Plume, (1907)
- Great Ralegh, (1908)
- The High Adventure, (1908)
- The Way Things Happen, (1909)
- Oxford From Within, (1910)
- A Fair House, (1911)
- A Daughter of the Morning, (1912)
- Pride of Body, (1914)
- Realms of Day, (1915)
- A Soldier of Life, (1916)
- Nine Tales, (1917)
- Women & Children, (1921)
- The Cricket Match, (1924)
- Young Mischief and the Perfect Pair, (1925)
- Young 'Un, (1927)
- Never in Vain: A Dream of Friendship, (1929)
- Mr Buffum, (1930)
- The Game of the Season, (1931)
- Evening Light:...Letters of Susan Rivarol...Prof Owen Mansfield, (1931)
- 'Over!': Some Personal Remarks on the Game of Cricket, (1932)
- Moreover: Reflections on the Game of Cricket, (1934)
- Studies From Life, (1934)
- The Saturday Match, (1937)
- Gauvinier Takes To Bowls, (1949)
