= Clare Hastings =

British author, fashion journalist, stylist and costume designer

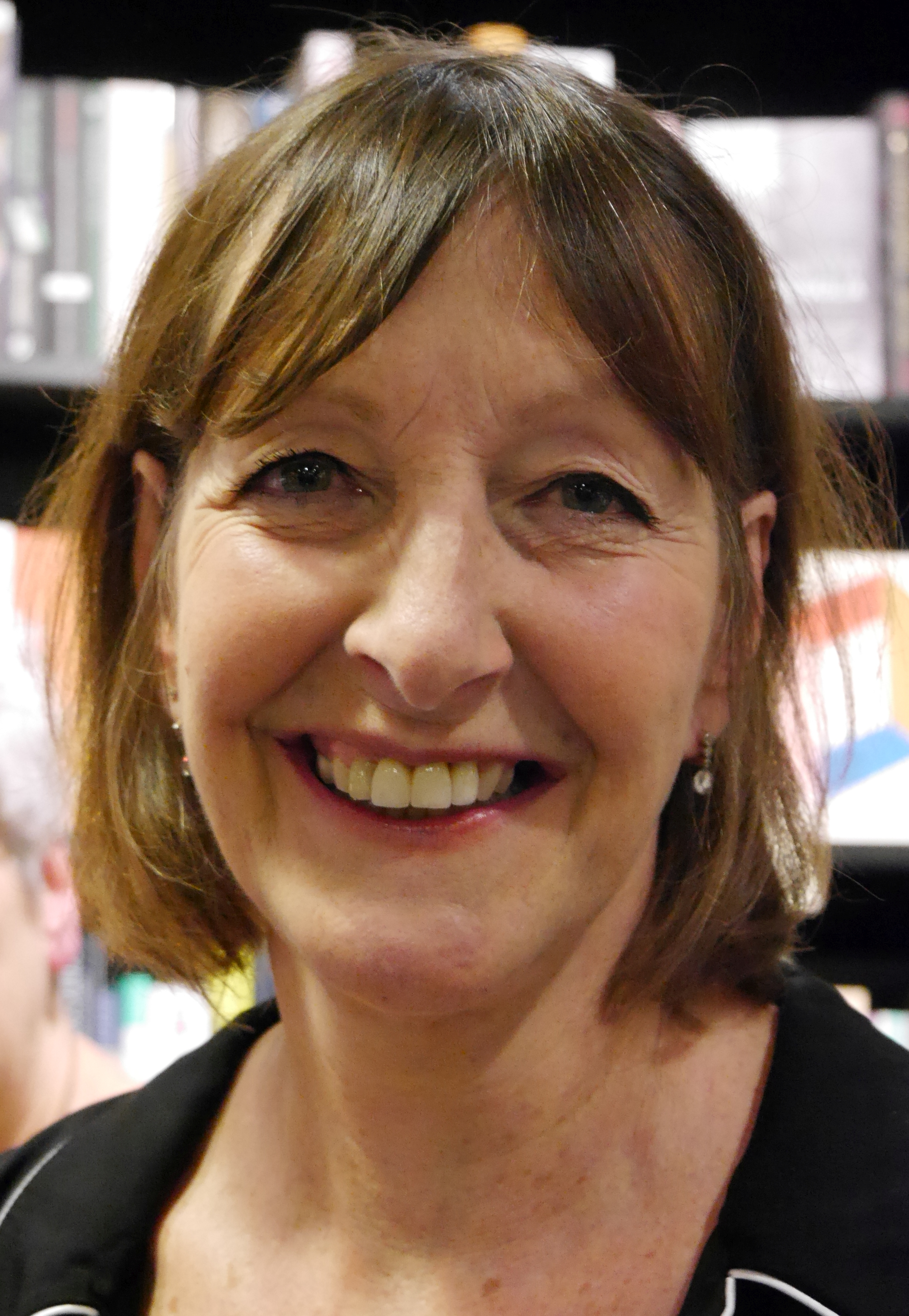
- Clare Hastings, Hatchards, London, November 2018
- Occupations: author, former fashion journalist and costume designer
- Partner: Nick Llewellyn
- Children: 1 daughter
- Parent(s): Macdonald Hastings; Anne Scott-James
- Relatives: Max Hastings (brother)

Clare Hastings is a British author, and a former fashion journalist, stylist and costume designer.

== Early life ==
She is the daughter of Macdonald Hastings and Anne Scott-James, and sister to Max Hastings.

== Career ==
Hastings worked for over 30 years as a fashion journalist, stylist and costume designer. She started her career as assistant to Anna Wintour at Harpers and Queen magazine.

Her book, The House in Little Chelsea, is about the history of an 1873 house in Finborough Road, London, that she bought in 1984, and has lived in ever since. Margaret Drabble "greatly enjoyed" it, and called it "very well done".

== Personal life ==
Hastings has lived with her partner Nick Llewellyn for over 30 years. She lives in London, and spends her weekends at her cottage in Berkshire. She has a daughter, Calypso Rose, who was the director of the experiences company The Indytute. Calypso is now a co-founder of OffScript advice for young people getting into work. She has co-written Please Don't Pick a Sensible Career with Calypso.

== Publications ==
- Gardening Notes from a Late Bloomer, Pimpernel Press, 2018
- The House in Little Chelsea, Pimpernel Press, 2018, ISBN 9781910258965
- Hold The Front Page!, Pimpernel Press, 2020
- Please Don't Pick a Sensible Career, 2026
