= Geisha (band) =

Australian pop rock band

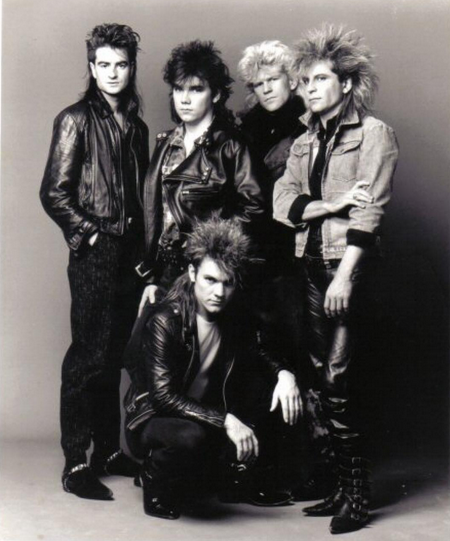
- Geisha in August 1985; Standing L-R: John Nyman, Donoghue Doheny, Peter Robertson, Ken Sheppard; Sitting: Chris Doheny

Background information
- Also known as: Geisha Detail
- Origin: Melbourne, Victoria, Australia
- Genres: Pop rock, glam rock, New Romantics
- Years active: 1983–1988, 1998, 2007–2012, 2015
- Labels: EMI, Diamond Dog, Almacantar
- Past members: Chris Doheny; Donoghue Doheny; John Nyman; Peter Robertson; Ken Sheppard; Bret Luton; Laurence Maddick; Rob Dean; Joe Matera; Tom Hosie; Alby Stefani

Geisha are an Australian pop rock band, which formed in 1983 as Geisha Detail with founding mainstay Chris Doheny on lead vocals and guitar (later also on bass guitar). Their highest-charting single, "Part Time Love Affair" (1986), peaked at No. 24 on the Australian Kent Music Report Singles Chart. They issued two albums, Geisha (August 1985) and Midnight to Dawn (October 1987), before disbanding in mid 1988. Geisha briefly reformed in April 1998 and released a compilation album, The Very Best of Geisha, late that year. Australian musicologist Ian McFarlane described their style as "1970s glam rock and early 1980s English New Romantic bands such as Duran Duran and Spandau Ballet". Another version of Geisha was established by Doheny in 2007.

== History ==
=== Formation as Geisha Detail, name change and "Fool's Way" (1983–1985) ===
In late 1983, Geisha were formed in Melbourne as Geisha Detail with Chris Doheny (Born 16 June, 1961) on lead vocals and guitar; Ken Sheppard on lead guitar and backing vocals & John Nyman on keyboards. The next year in 1984, Chris' younger brother Donoghue Doheny, on bass guitar; and Peter Robertson on drums joined the band. They shortened their name to Geisha and signed with EMI Records. Australian musicologist, Ian McFarlane, described their style as "1970s glam rock and early 1980s English New Romantic bands such as Duran Duran and Spandau Ballet". In March 1985, the group released their debut single, "Fool's Way", which appeared on the Australian Kent Music Report Singles Chart. It was produced by Dave Marett (The Exponents) and was written by Chris Doheny.

=== "Rainy Day", self-titled debut album Geisha & "Kabuki" (1985) ===
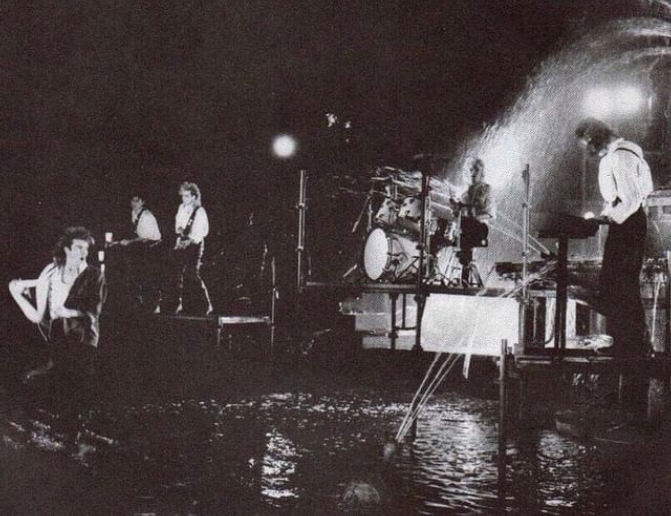
Geisha filming a music video for "Rainy Day" (1985)

Later that year from May to June they recorded their self-titled debut album "Geisha" with Peter Dawkins (Dragon, Australian Crawl and Air Supply) producing and Richard Lush engineering. They released another single "Rainy Day" in July 1985, which was written by Chris Doheny and Ken Sheppard. Their self-titled debut album "Geisha" was released in August 1985, which also includes a cover of The Beatles' "Come Together". In October of that year, Geisha released their third single "Kabuki". Their singles sold well in the local market – "Kabuki" reached No. 20 on the Melbourne charts – as they had developed popularity on the suburban pub circuit. Nationally they had less chart success, where "Kabuki" reached the top 50. That song appeared on Countdown, which was Geisha's first ever Countdown performance.

=== Re-Release of "Rainy Day", first lineup change, "Part Time Love Affair" and "Girl Like You" (1986) ===
In March 1986 Geisha re-released "Rainy Day". However, by the mid year, John Nyman, Chris' brother Donoghue Doheny & Peter Robertson all left the band. In July, they had become a three-piece, with Chris Doheny (Now playing bass at that time) and Ken Sheppard joined by Bret Luton (ex-Dance Park) on drums. Their next single "Part Time Love Affair" was released in August 1986, which reached No. 24 on the Kent Music Report and No. 3 on the Melbourne charts, which was Geisha's high charting single. In September 1986, Geisha along with Painters and Dockers played in different train stations titled Rockin' The Rails. Around late September or early October in that year, they recorded "Normal People" (Which was later released the next year in October 1987) and "Girl Like You". Both of those songs are composed by Chris Doheny and Ken Sheppard. "Girl Like You" was issued in November 1986 as an EP release, which also charted nationally.

=== Midnight To Dawn, second lineup change and breakup (1987–1988) ===
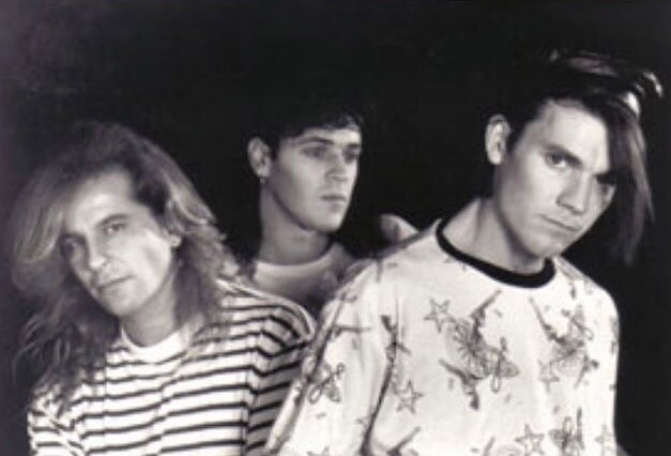
Geisha in July 1987 (From L-R: Ken Sheppard, Bret Luton, Chris Doheny)

Around March–April 1987, Geisha recorded their second album "Midnight To Dawn". In July 1987, they released their sixth single, "Calling Your Name", which reached the top 100, but never made it to the top 50. In late August, co-founder and long-time guitarist Ken Sheppard and drummer Bret Luton left the band. In September of that year, former Japan guitarist Rob Dean joined on guitar and former James Freud and Radio Stars/Berlin drummer Tom Hosie joined on drums, both of them replacing Ken Sheppard and Bret Luton. On that month, "Normal People" was released and followed in late October by the release of their second album, Midnight to Dawn. The album's tracks were produced by David Courtney except "Normal People" by Kevin Beamish and "Part Time Love Affair" by band members. By November 1987, Geisha released "Never Tell You Why", which never charted. By early 1988, Geisha were now a four piece of Chris Doheny (Now back with bass guitar), Rob Dean, Laurence Maddick and Tom Hosie before they officially broke up in mid 1988.

=== Post break-up, Chris Doheny's More Than A Game & briefly reunion (1988–1998) ===
After Geisha disbanded, Chris Doheny wrote for notable Australian acts such as Daryl Braithwaite, for whom Chris Doheny wrote 'In My Life" (That would have been feature of Geisha's lost third album "No Second Prize" that Chris originally recorded in December 1987) for Braithwaite's comeback album Edge in 1988; James Blundell, and Lee Kernaghan. In late 1989, Chris Doheny was a touring bassist for Sweden band Roxette (Who came to Australia when their 1988 singles "Dressed for Success" and "Listen to Your Heart" were in the Australia charts) for Australia TV performances. In 1990, Chris Doheny formed All the Young Dudes with Pierre Gigliotti (ex-Pseudo Echo) and released a mini-album in 1991. In 1993, Chris Doheny formed his hard rock project, Dragonfly, with Craig Harnath (ex-Kids in the Kitchen, Chocolate Starfish), and released two extended plays, River of Love and Black Money. In 1994, Doheny provided lead vocals for "More Than a Game", the opening theme song for Nine Network TV program The Footy Show, which charted in the top 60 of the ARIA Singles Chart, becoming his first appearance on Australian charts as a solo artist. In September 1997, he released a solo single, "Can You Hear the Rain" (Roadshow Music). In April 1998, Geisha temporarily reformed with the 1984-1986 line-up (Chris and Donoghue Doheny, Ken Sheppard, John Nyman, and Peter Robertson) for a live performance at The Mercury Lounge at Crown Casino in July of that year, and EMI Records released a compilation album, The Very Best of Geisha, in August.

=== Later years, Geisha's lost third album No Second Prize and new lineup (2005–2009) ===
In 2005, Chris Doheny performed acoustic versions of Geisha material on Chartbusting 80s on Melbourne TV station Channel 31. From February in the following year, he began work on an album, Acoustic Memoirs of Geisha, at his own Dragon Lair Studio. It was produced and mixed at Lincoln Road Studios by Bill Kio. The album appeared in September on Doheny's independent label, Diamond Dog Records, and in the US on Almacantar Records. The next month, Chris Doheny and Friends performed Geisha material. In the same year, Doheny supervised the release of another Geisha album, No Second Prize, which had been recorded in 1988 and which would have been their third Geisha album at that time. In 2007, he formed a new line-up of Geisha with Joe Matera on guitar. I Heart Guitar's Peter Hodgson reviewed a March 2010 gig: "Matera’s playing is obviously informed by the great 70s guitar gods" whereas "[Doheny's] tone delved a little further back in music history, to London in the 60s", and Hodgson was "particularly impressed by Doheny’s vocal power".

=== Yesterday, Today and Tomorrow, Matera's leave, Dysphasia, later works, and Chris’ death (2010–2025) ===
In January 2010, Geisha released another compilation album, Yesterday, Today and Tomorrow, which provided two singles, "Birthday" (previously an iTunes release) and the double-A sided "Mystery Writer" / "Sgt. Peppers Lonely Hearts Club Band". Two additional tracks are cover versions of Small Faces' "Tin Soldier" and The Beatles' "Come Together". In late 2010, Matera left the group to focus on his solo career. In 2011, the Geisha line-up of Doheny on vocals, guitar and bass guitar; Tom Hosie on drums (previously in the 1987 line-up); and Alby Stefani on bass guitar, guitar and keyboards; recorded material for a proposed new studio album, Dysphasia. The lead single, "Sailing", was issued in July 2011. According to Chris Doheny's website, the album was due before Christmas in 2011. Early in 2012, Doheny released a solo single, a cover of Foo Fighters' "Times Like These". Geisha reformed again for the 30th anniversary of the self-titled debut album, which was originally released in 1985.

Founding member Chris Doheny died in a traffic collision in Kapunda, South Australia on 19 September 2025, at the age of 64.

== Members ==
- Chris Doheny – vocals, acoustic guitar, bass guitar (1983–1988, 1998, 2007–2012, 2015; died 2025)
- Donoghue Doheny – bass guitar, keyboards (1984–1986, 1998)
- John Nyman – keyboards (1983–1986, 1998)
- Peter Robertson – drums (1984–1986, 1998)
- Ken Sheppard – guitars, backing vocals (1983–1987, 1998)
- Bret Luton – drums (1986–1987)
- Laurence Maddick – keyboards, backing vocals (1987–1988)
- Rob Dean – guitars, backing vocals (1987–1988)
- Joe Matera – guitars, backing vocals (2007–2010)
- Alby Stefani – keyboards, bass guitar (2007–2012, 2015)
- Tom Hosie – drums (1987–1988, 2007–2012)

== Discography ==
=== Studio albums ===
List of studio albums, with selected details and chart positions
Title	Album details	Peak chart positions
Title	Album details	AUS
Geisha	Released: 26 August 1985; Label: EMI (EMX 430031); Format: LP, cassette	77
Midnight to Dawn	Released: 26 October 1987; Label: EMI (EMX 430057); Format: LP, cassette, CD	71
No Second Prize	Released: 2007 (Recorded in 1988); Format: CD; Label: Almacantar (AR-3723)	—

=== Compilation albums ===
List of compilation albums, with selected details
Title	Details
The Very Best of Geisha	Released: August 1998; Format: CD; Label: EMI (72434956692 7)
Demo Sessions 84-85	Released: 2006; Format: CD; Label: Almacantar (AR-3723)
Acoustic Memoirs of Geisha	Released: 2006; Format: CD; Label: Almacantar (AR-5357)
Demo Sessions 86-87	Released: 2007; Format: CD; Label: Almacantar (AR-4657)
Yesterday, Today and Tomorrow	Released: 2010; Format: CD; Label: Diamond Dogs (DDR 1011)

=== Singles ===
List of singles, with selected chart positions
Title	Year	Peak chart positions	Album
Title	Year	AUS	Album
"Fool's Way"/"Heartfall"	1985	53	Geisha
"Rainy Day"/"Not the Same"	1985	95	Geisha
"Kabuki"/"Moving to the Rhythm"	1985	42	Geisha
"Rainy Day (Remix)"/"Night Games"	1986	59	Non-album single
"Part Time Love Affair"/"Twilight Love"	1986	24	Non-album single which was later re-recorded for Midnight to Dawn
"Girl Like You"/"Part Time Love Affair"	1986	62	Non-album single
"Calling Your Name"/"Don't Come Knocking After Midnight"	1987	57	Midnight to Dawn
"Normal People"/"Paranoid Street"	1987	92	Midnight to Dawn
"Never Tell You Why"/"Shining Star"	1987	—	Midnight to Dawn
"Nobody's Angel" (Recorded in 1988)	2006	—	No Second Prize
"No Second Prize" (Recorded in 1988)	2007	—	No Second Prize
"Birthday"	2009	—	Yesterday, Today and Tomorrow
"Mystery Writer"/"Sgt Peppers Lonely Hearts Club Band"	2010	—	Yesterday, Today and Tomorrow
"Tin Soldier"	2010	—	Yesterday, Today and Tomorrow
"Sailing"	2011	—	Dysphasia

=== Chris Doheny singles ===
List of singles, with selected chart positions
Title	Year	Peak chart positions
Title	Year	AUS
"More Than a Game"	1994	54
"Can You Hear the Rain"	1997	—
"Times Like These"	2012	—
