= Michael Joseph (publisher) =

British publisher and writer

- Born: 26 September 1897; Maida Vale, London, England
- Died: 15 March 1958 (aged 60); Marylebone, London, England
- Occupations: Publisher and writer
- Organisation: Michael Joseph Ltd
- Spouse(s): Hermione Gingold (m. 1918; div. 1926) Edna Victoria Nellie Frost (m. 1949, death) Anthea Esther Hodson (m. 1950)

Michael Joseph (26 September 1897 – 15 March 1958) was a British publisher and writer.

== Early life and career ==
Joseph was born in Upper Clapton, London. During the First World War, he served as a captain in the Machine Gun Corps and was in the line near Arras. After the war, he embarked on a writing career, his first book being Short Story Writing for Profit (1923).

In 1930, he lived near Regent's Park, where he adopted a Siamese cat, Charles, who became the subject of Joseph's book Charles - The Story of a Friendship. In the summer of 1935, Joseph moved to Acacia Road, St John's Wood, opposite composer Roger Quilter. At the outbreak of war in 1939, Joseph moved to Mayfield, Sussex.

After a period as a literary agent for Curtis Brown, Joseph founded his own publishing imprint as a subsidiary of Victor Gollancz Ltd. Gollancz invested £4000 in Michael Joseph Ltd, established 5 September 1935. Joseph and Victor Gollancz disagreed on many points and Michael Joseph bought out Gollancz Ltd in 1938, after Gollancz attempted to censor Across the Frontiers by Sir Philip Gibbs on political grounds. (Joseph published the first edition in 1938 and a revised edition the following May.) Joseph managed to build up an impressive list of authors, including H. E. Bates, C. S. Forester, Monica Dickens and Richard Llewellyn.

He was a member of the Army Officers' Emergency Reserve, and in the summer of 1940 was called up and posted to a battalion of the Queen's Own Royal West Kent Regiment as Company commander, responsible for guarding the coast. Service included three months 'on the beach' and training in an armoured division before the battalion moved to Lambourn. In the spring of 1941, he retired from the army on medical grounds, and purchased Copyhold Farm near Newbury, Berkshire, where he moved with his family.

== Personal life ==
Joseph married actress Hermione Gingold in 1918, and they had two sons, Leslie and Stephen Joseph. (The Stephen Joseph Theatre in Scarborough, established by the latter in 1955, was Britain's first theatre in the round.) The couple divorced in 1926, and Joseph promptly married Edna Victoria Nellie Frost, with whom he had a daughter, Shirley, and son, Richard. Richard established a successful career in printing, and then later running his own publishing company. (Richard and his wife, Elizabeth, had a son, Adam Joseph and daughter, Rachel Joseph). Edna died in 1949, and Joseph's third marriage the next year was to Anthea Esther Hodson, with whom he had a daughter, Charlotte, and son, Hugh. Anthea ran the publishing business after her husband's death.

== Death ==
Michael Joseph died of septicaemia in 1958, after a delayed medical operation. He was 60.

== Michael Joseph Ltd from 1958 ==
After Joseph died, his widow Anthea Joseph rescued the publishing company Michael Joseph Ltd from the ensuing crisis. In 1985, Michael Joseph Ltd was acquired by Penguin Books. Penguin turned its new property into one of its imprints, and in 2018, Penguin described Michael Joseph as "[t]he leading commercial fiction and non-fiction imprint of Penguin Books", specialising in "women's fiction, crime, thrillers, cookery, memoirs and lifestyle books".

== Books written by Michael Joseph ==
- Short Story Writing for Profit (London: Hutchinson & Co., 1923)
- Journalism for Profit (1924)
- The Commercial Side of Literature (Hutchinson, 1925)
- How to Write a Short Story (Hutchinson, 1926)
- How to Write Serial Fiction (Hutchinson, 1927); US edition, Holt, 1928, "by Michael Joseph and Marten Cumberland"
- The Magazine Story: with ten examples analysed by Michael Joseph (Hutchinson, 1928)
- The Autobiography of a Journalist (Hutchinson, 1929), ed. and introduced by Joseph The autobiography of a journalist – uncertain role
- Cat's Company (London: Geoffrey Bles, 1930), "illustrations ... are from drawings made by a celebrated German artist, B. F. Dolbin"; later illus. Clare Dawson (Chicago: Ziff-Davis, 1947)
- A Book of Cats, being twenty drawings by Foujita; poems in prose by Michael Joseph (New York: Covici-Friede, 1930), artwork by Tsuguharu Foujita
- This Writing Business (Faber & Faber, 1931), 32 pp
- Puss in Books: A Collection of Stories about Cats (New York: Dodd, Mead & Company, 1932), ed. Elizabeth Drew and Joseph, illus. A. R. Wheelan
- Heads or Tails (1933), with Selwyn Johnson
- Discovery, A Play in Three Acts (Gollancz, 1934)
- Kittens and Cats (Racine: Whitman, 1938)
- The Sword in the Scabbard (Joseph, 1942)
- Charles: The Story of a Friendship (Joseph, 1943), 91 pp.
- Complete Writing for Profit (London: Hutchinson & Co., 1938), 1097 pp.
- The Adventure of Publishing (London: Allan Wingate, 1949)
- Best Cat Stories (Faber, 1952), ed. Joseph, illus. Eileen Mayo

== Authors and series published by Michael Joseph Ltd ==
Authors on Michael Joseph Ltd.’s list included H. E. Bates, Vicki Baum, Joyce Cary, Monica Dickens, C. S. Forester, Paul Gallico, Richard Gordon, Barry Hines, D. F. Karaka, Richard Llewellyn, Bertrand Russell, Vita Sackville-West and Derek Tangye.

Book series published by the firm included the Cadet Edition, Carfax Editions, Mermaid Books, The Minack Chronicles, The Rosemary Library and the 6/- Net Edition.
