= James Pycroft =

English priest and cricket writer

James Pycroft (1813 – 10 March 1895) is chiefly known for writing The Cricket Field, one of the earliest books about cricket, published in 1851.

Pycroft mythologised cricket as a noble, manly and essentially British activity ("Cricket is essentially Anglo-Saxon, ... Foreigners have rarely imitated us. English settlers everywhere play at cricket; but of no single club have we heard that dieted either with frogs, saur-kraut (sic) or macaroni"). His hagiography favourably compared the virtues of Victorian cricket with the disgraceful state of play at the turn of the century where "Lord's was frequented by men with book and pencil, betting as openly and professionally as in the ring at Epsom, and ready to deal in the odds with any and every person of speculative propensities".

Pycroft was also a cricketer, appearing in four matches for Oxford University (where he was at Trinity College) in 1836 and 1838 and in one for a team called "Left-Handers" in 1838. He studied law at Lincoln's Inn but then became a Church of England priest and was perpetual curate at Barnstaple, Devon, 1845–56. He wrote several books, including volumes of autobiography.
