= England, Their England =

1933 novel by A. G. Macdonell

- First edition
- Author: A. G. Macdonell
- Language: English
- Genre: Social satire
- Publisher: MacMillan
- Publication date: Dec. 1933
- Publication place: United Kingdom
- Media type: Print (hardcover)
- Pages: ix pages, 1 leaf, 299 pages, 20 cm. foreword by Christopher Morley (first edition)
- OCLC: 366073
- Followed by: How Like An Angel (1934)

England, Their England (1933) is an affectionately satirical comic novel of 1920s English urban and rural society by the Scottish writer A. G. Macdonell. It is particularly famed for its portrayal of village cricket.

== Social satire ==
One of a genre at the time, the novel examines the changing nature of English society during the interwar period. The style and subject matter recall the works of Evelyn Waugh and P. G. Wodehouse, Macdonell's contemporaries, as well as earlier writers such as Jerome K. Jerome. It is also known for its description of traditional village cricket. The novel is purported to be a roman à clef. The novel won the James Tait Black Memorial Prize for fiction in 1933. The title alludes to the refrain "England, My England" of the poem "Pro Rege Nostro" by William Ernest Henley.

== Plot ==
Set in 1920s England, the book takes the form of a travel memoir by a young Scotsman who has been invalided away from the Western Front, "Donald Cameron", whose father's will forces him to reside in England. There he writes for a series of London newspapers, before being commissioned by a Welshman to write a book about the English from the view of a foreigner. Taking to the country and provincial cities, Donald spends his time doing research for a book on the English by consorting with journalists and minor poets, attending a country house weekend, serving as private secretary to a Member of Parliament, attending the League of Nations, and playing village cricket. The village cricket match is the most celebrated episode in the novel, and a reason cited for its enduring appeal. An important character is Mr Hodge, a caricature of Sir John Squire (poet and editor of the London Mercury), while the cricket team described in the book's most famous chapter is a representation of Sir John's Cricket Club – the Invalids – which survives today. The book ends in the ancient city of Winchester, where Macdonell went to school.
