= More Than a Game (Chris Doheny song) =

Single by Chris Doheny
- B-side: "Footy Show Opener"
- Released: 1994
- Studio: Sing Sing Studios, Cremorne, Victoria
- Genre: Rock
- Length: 3:32
- Label: Fable; EMI
- Songwriters: Darren Sanicki; John Albert
- Producer: Darren Sanicki

"More Than a Game" is a song recorded by Australian musician and former Geisha lead singer Chris Doheny. The song was written by Darren Sanicki and John Albert as the theme song to the Nine Network's Australian rules football variety program The Footy Show. It was released as a stand-alone single in 1994, and remained the program's theme song until its demise in 2019. The song was also the subject of multiple legal disputes raised by Sanicki over copyright and intellectual property infringement.

== Background and release ==
The genesis of what would become "More Than a Game" was conceived when Nine Network television producer Harvey Silver approached Doheny about penning a theme song for the pilot of a new football television program (what would become The Footy Show). Silver was a fan of Doheny through his work as frontman of Melbourne pop rock band Geisha, and introduced him to both Darren Sanicki and Josh Abrahams, who would end up writing and co-producing the song respectively. Nine then licensed the song from Sanicki annually for a fee of A$10,000, with the agreement beginning on 12 April 1994 and renewing each subsequent year.

The phrase "more than a game" then began to be used frequently in newspaper headlines and captions to highlight the increasing relationship between commercialism and the sport itself. Surpassing football entirely, Reverend Tim Costello used the slogan "it's more than a game" as part of his campaign as a candidate for the Australian Constitutional Convention in November 1997. Costello himself was critical of Footy Show host Eddie McGuire's own ticket as part of the Australian Republic Movement, ultimately linking the phrase and the television program from which it was sourced.

A legal dispute arose in February 1998 over the name of a television special also entitled More Than a Game, which was produced by McGuire's production company McGuire Media and was to be broadcast on successive Thursdays ahead of the return of The Footy Show in March. Nine's Victorian managing director Ian Johnson described the copyright dispute brought upon them by Sanicki's solicitors Roth Warren as "one fight we're going to win". The specials would eventually be broadcast under its intended title.

Doheny performed the theme song live upon McGuire's return to hosting The Footy Show in August 2017 following a 12-year absence. Soon after, the song was once again at the centre of a legal dispute, this time more than two decades after its release. In September 2017, media reports revealed that co-writer Sanicki—a lawyer himself—had issued a writ against the Nine Network seeking compensation for loss and damages for what he described as an "unauthorised use of the song". Sanicki had taken Nine to the Federal Court in the case of Darren Sanicki v. General Television Corporation Pty. Ltd. on 24 July 2017. On 15 December 2017, almost three months after Nine's defence was submitted (which itself prompted a reply from Sanicki a fortnight later), Justice Bernard Murphy gave his final orders that the application for intellectual property infringement had been discontinued.

== Critical reception ==
Described by critics as a driving rock tune in the vein of Survivor's "Eye of the Tiger", the song has been praised as one of the best football-related songs in existence.

== Commercial performance ==
The track peaked on the Australian ARIA Charts at number 54 on 2 October 1994.

== Cover versions ==
In September 2010, Australian producer M-Phazes covered the song alongside Muph and Candice Monique for national radio station Triple J's Like a Version segment.

== Track listing ==
- CD single (1994)
1. "More Than a Game"
2. "More Than a Game" (Instrumental)
3. "More Than a Game" ("Bag of Lollies" Club Remix)
4. "Footy Show Opener"
- '21st Anniversary Edition' digital single (2014)
1. "More Than a Game" (21st Anniversary Edition) – 2:59

== Credits and personnel ==
=== Locations ===
- Recorded at Sing Sing Studios, Cremorne, Victoria
- Mixed at Sing Sing Studios, Cremorne, Victoria (tracks 1–2, 4)
- Remixed at Fish Tank Studios, Elsternwick, Victoria (track 3)

=== Personnel ===
- Darren Sanicki – writing, music, production, keyboards, remixing
- Chris Doheny – vocals
- Jon Dexter – rhythm guitar, lead guitar, bass guitar
- Ian Hallings – brass
- Adrian Jacobson – drums
- Lani Zaitman – backing vocals
- Josh Abrahams – co-production, programming, remixing
- Kaj Dahlstrom – mixing
- Claire Harvey – graphic design

== Charts ==
Weekly chart performance for "More Than a Game"
Chart (1994)	Peak position
Australia (ARIA)	54

== See also ==
- Australian rules football in Australian popular culture
