= E. W. Padwick =

British cricket bibliographer and librarian

Eric William Padwick (23 January 1923 – 29 March 2010) was a professional bibliographer who compiled the definitive bibliography of cricket literature. He was also Deputy Librarian of the Guildhall Library.

The Cricket Society commissioned him to compile a comprehensive bibliography of cricket literature under the title A Bibliography of Cricket. The first edition, published in 1977 by the Library Association had 8294 entries. It covered the period until 1973. A revised edition, published in 1984, extended the number of entries to over 10,000. A second volume, published in 1991 as Padwick's Bibliography of Cricket, Volume 2, was compiled by Stephen Eley and Peter Griffiths and covered works published between 1980 and 1990 (ISBN 978-0853655282). In 2008 Stephen W. Gibbs published in a limited edition Post Padwick: The Gibbs Extension of Padwick's Bibliography, 1990-2006, with 7049 entries.

Of the first edition, John Arlott wrote in his review of the cricket books of 1977 in Wisden Cricketers' Almanack that it "is one of the most important works in the entire history of cricket literature... This is a major contribution not only to cricket at present, but to its literature of the future."

Padwick died on 29 March 2010, aged 87.

== Bibliography ==
Items are "by E. W. Padwick" except where otherwise noted.

- The Librarian Subject Guide to Books, Vol. 1, History, travel & description / general editor Lionel R. McColvin, associate editors K. R. McColvin, E. W. Padwick. pub. Clarke, 1959.
- The Librarian Subject Guide to Books, Volume Two, Biography, Family History, Heraldry, Genealogy Etc.., general editor Lionel R. McColvin, associate editors K. R. McColvin, E. W. Padwick. pub. James Clarke, 1960.
- Education: A Guide to Current Literature, 1963, ISBN 978-0-902837-02-7.
- Bibliographical Method (Aspects of Librarianship Series), pub. James Clarke & Co Ltd, 1969, ISBN 978-0-227-67718-6.
- A Bibliography of Cricket, 1st edition, pub. Library Association, 1977, ISBN 978-0-85365-129-1.
- Sixteen Fleet Street, 1522-1980: A house and its tenants, private circulation only, 1982.
- A Bibliography of Cricket, 2nd edition, pub. Library Association in association with McKenzie (Bookseller) on behalf of Cricket Society, 1984, ISBN 978-0-85365-902-0.
- William Herbert 1772-1851: Actor, Antiquary and Librarian, by Donovan Dawe and E. W. Padwick, Guildhall Library Publications, 1998, ISBN 978-0-900422-43-0.
