= Charles Hodson, Baron Hodson =

British judge (1895–1984)

The Right Honourable The Lord Hodson MC PC
- Hodson in 1954, by Walter Stoneman

Lords of Appeal in Ordinary
- In office 1 October 1960 – 1971

Lord Justice of Appeal
- In office 15 January 1951 – 1 October 1960

Justice of the High Court
- In office 1937–1951

Personal details
- Born: Francis Lord Charlton Hodson; 17 September 1895 Cheltenham, Gloucestershire, England
- Died: 11 March 1984 (aged 88) Goring-on-Thames, South Oxfordshire
- Spouse: Susan Mary Blake (m. 1918; died 1965)
- Children: 3, including Anthea Joseph
- Education: Cheltenham College
- Alma mater: Wadham College, Oxford
- Occupation: Judge

Military service
- Allegiance: United Kingdom
- Branch/service: British Army
- Years of service: 1915–1919
- Rank: Captain
- Unit: Gloucestershire Regiment
- Battles/wars: First World War

Francis Lord Charlton Hodson, Baron Hodson, MC, PC (17 September 1895 – 11 March 1984), also known as Charles Hodson, was a British judge who served as Lord of Appeal in Ordinary from 1960 to 1971.

== Biography ==
Charles, as he was always known, was the son of Rev. Thomas Hodson, rector of Oddington, Gloucestershire, and Catherine Anne (née Maskew), he was born in Cheltenham, Gloucestershire, and educated at Cheltenham College and Wadham College, Oxford.

His university studies were interrupted by the First World War, during which he served with the 7th Battalion, Gloucestershire Regiment in Gallipoli and Mesopotamia, being wounded several times. He received the Military Cross for his action during the Siege of Kut with the following citation:

For conspicuous gallantry and devotion to duty. He led his company most gallantly against a strong enemy redoubt, being twice wounded, and refused to be brought in till the wounded round him had been evacuated.

After the war, Hodson finished his studies and was called to the Bar by the Inner Temple in 1921. He initially practiced at the common law bar, but switched to the divorce bar, then thought of as a dead end because of financial reasons. At the time, judges of the Probate, Divorce and Admiralty Division were inevitable drawn from the admiralty bar. However, in 1937, the impending passage of the Matrimonial Causes Bill and the projected rise in the number of divorce cases made the appointment of a divorce specialist to the bench inevitable. As a consequence, that year, he was made a King's Counsel at the Lord Chancellor's invitation, was appointed to the High Court shortly after, and received the customary knighthood. Aged 42, he was the youngest High Court judge ever appointed.

He was Lord Justice of Appeal from 1951 to 1960, and was sworn in the Privy Council in 1951. On 1 October 1960, he was appointed Lord of Appeal in Ordinary and was created a life peer with the title Baron Hodson, of Rotherfield Greys in the County of Oxford.

He retired as Lord of Appeal in 1971. Hodson was a member of the International Court of Arbitration at The Hague between 1949 and 1971 and further president of the British branch of the International Law Association.

Of his legacy, Lord Devlin wrote that "Hodson's thirty-four years of judicial service left little or no mark on the law. He took the law as he found it, whether he liked it or not."

== Selected judgments ==
In Shaw v DPP, (1961) UKHL 1 rendered on 4 May 1961, Lord Hodson said,

I am wholly satisfied that there is a common law misdemeanour of conspiracy to corrupt public morals. The judicial precedents which have been cited show conclusively to my mind that the Courts have never abandoned their function as custodes morum by surrendering to the Legislature the right and duty to apply established principles to new combinations of circumstances.

== Personal life ==
In 1918, Hodson married Susan Mary Blake, daughter of Major William Greaves Blake. Susan had been his nurse during the war. They had three children. Their daughter, the Hon. Anthea Joseph, became a prominent publisher. Their elder son, Lt. Hubert Blake Hodson, was killed in action in Libya on 22 January 1941 while serving with the 9th Queen's Royal Lancers. The younger son, Hon. Charles Christopher Philip Hodson, married Rose Markham, daughter of Sir Charles Markham, 2nd Baronet, in 1953.

Lady Hodson died in 1965. Lord Hodson died in 1984 at a nursing home in Goring-on-Thames.
