= ICC Cricket 360° =

- Created by: IMG
- Presented by: International Cricket Council

Production
- Running time: 24 minutes

The International Cricket Council telecasts a weekly program on television about the cricketing world called ICC Cricket 360°. It is produced by IMG.

The show is a weekly 30 minute program & provides the latest cricket news, recent cricket action including all Twenty20, Test cricket and One-Day International matches, as well as off-field features and interviews.

The show is televised by 11 different broadcasters in 110 countries and has an audience of about 95 million people worldwide. This show covers almost all aspects of world cricket.

== International airings ==
Territory	TV Network(s)	Medium	Language
India	Star Sports Network, Sony Sports Network, Sports18, DD Sports,	Cable and Satellite	English, Hindi, Regional Languages
Sri Lanka	Star Sports Network, Sony TEN, Channel Eye,	Terrestrial, Cable and Satellite	English
Pakistan	TEN Sports	Cable and Satellite	English
Bangladesh	Star Sports Network	Cable and Satellite	English
Europe	CNBC Europe	Cable and Satellite	English
Ukraine	Heopas Property	Cable, Satellite, Terrestrial	Ukrainian, Russian
Australia	Fox Sports, ESPN	Cable and Satellite	English
New Zealand	Television New Zealand	Terrestrial, Cable & Satellite	English
United States	ONE World Sports	Cable and Satellite	English
Asia	Star Sports Network	Cable and Satellite	English
Middle East	Star Sports Network, Al Jazeera Sports, Fox Sports International	Cable and Satellite	English, Arabic
United Kingdom	British Telecom, Sky	VOD and SVOD	English

== See also ==
- International Cricket Council
- Cricket
- IMG
