= Trobriand Cricket (film) =

Trobriand Cricket: An Ingenious Response to Colonialism is an anthropological Documentary film about the people of the Trobriand Islands and their unique innovations to the game of cricket, filmed in 1973–74. The film was made by Gary Kildea, under the direction of anthropologist Jerry Leach. It was shot in three weeks, on a budget of around Au$180,000.

== Historical context and film summary ==
Cricket was introduced to Trobriand by a British missionary, Reverend Gilmour, in the early 20th century, to replace violent tribal warfare with gentlemanly sportsmanship. Cricket in Trobriand underwent a dramatic transformation: the number of players, balls, bats, rules, and uniforms changed, as did the meaning of the sport and manner of play. In the film, cricket in Trobriand appears to be a form of ritualized warfare.

The film contrasts scenes of the original, staid game played on pitches in England with the Trobriand version, full of colors, sounds, music, and dance. A Trobriand "reporter" also seeks to find the meaning and origin of his 'own' culture, by interviewing senior members of the community and by observing the cricket game/ritual.

In fact, this film was done of a reconstruction of cricket match "specifically enacted for the camera team by the members of a local political movement, who at the time of filming (1973) were seeking an ascendant role in the Trobriand politics." Annette Weiner, in an article she wrote about the movie in 1977, also claims that this Kabisawali Association movement, led by John Kasaipwalova (or John K, as Kiriwina people called him) caused "intense sociopolitical factionalism that generated hatred, violence and confusion" and that John K was convicted by the Papua New Guinea government for embezzlement of government funds. Weiner also notes that during that period and after, cricket was not being played in Kiriwina. Thus the Trobriand cricket in this film was a well orchestrated and heavily edited version of something of which Trobrianders had recent memory.

== Anthropological significance ==
Notwithstanding criticism of the re-enactment and surrounding politics, the film was praised for its anthropological contribution.

The film dramatically communicates the message that the Trobriand version is not in any sense a “primitive” game, nor is it a sport benignly accepted in its foreign form. Rather, Trobriand cricket is seen as a sophisticated activity, thoughtfully and creatively adapted by the local people, an adaptation that reflects the importance of fundamental cultural premises. From this perspective, the film has value for beginning anthropology students as well as those noncricket initiates for whom the fact that recently British women were permitted to swing their cricket bats at Lord’s in London would not be an impressive news item. (Unfortunately, Trobriand women did not escape the traditional male-dominated British game and they have not yet invaded the playing field.)

— Weiner, 1977

Trobriand Cricket is historically significant because it served in part as a model for future filmmakers seeking to take on an ethnographic project. In an interview published in the Spring 1978 issue of Film Quarterly, ethnographic filmmaker Jean Rouch is quoted as saying about Trobriand Cricket: “It's a wonderful film, perhaps one of the greatest anthropological films of recent time.”
