= A. G. Macdonell =

Scottish writer, journalist and broadcaster

Archibald Gordon Macdonell

Archibald Gordon Macdonell (3 November 1895 – 16 January 1941) was a Scottish writer, journalist and broadcaster, whose most famous work is the gently satirical novel England, Their England (1933).

== Early life and education ==
Macdonell was born in Poona, India to a Scottish family, the younger son of William Robert Macdonell, LL.D, an East India merchant and chairman of the Bombay chamber of commerce, and Alice Elizabeth, daughter of miller and art collector John Forbes White, who had trained as a doctor. The family subsequently lived in Aberdeen. His father was "a prominent personality" in Bombay, and "a devoted student of literature and the arts" who corresponded with the novelist George Gissing; his mother's sister, Rachel White, was a distinguished Newnham College, Cambridge-educated classical scholar and one of the earliest female teachers of the subject.

Macdonell was educated at Winchester where he excelled academically and at sports, representing the school at association football and golf.

== Career ==
During World War I, he served for two years as a lieutenant of the Royal Field Artillery before being invalided out of the army, possibly because of shell shock (Lieutenant Cameron, the protagonist of England, Their England is sent home for that reason). The war had a profound effect on him, as it did with so many of his generation. Afterwards he spent two years in eastern Europe, firstly on the reconstruction of Poland, and then on famine relief in Russia. In 1922 he joined the staff of the League of Nations where he spent five years. Politically, he was a supporter of the Liberal Party. During 1923 and 1924 he unsuccessfully contested Lincoln as the Liberal candidate.

Macdonell made his living as a journalist in London, principally writing stage reviews for the London Mercury. In 1933, he became famous with the publication of England, Their England. The book gained considerable critical and popular acclaim, and won the James Tait Black Award that year.

Today, Macdonell is mostly remembered for this book of his. It is regarded as one of the classics of English humour and is loved by readers for its evocation of England between the wars. It is particularly cherished by devotees of cricket for its famous description of the village cricket match.

Although the rest of his books have been largely forgotten, several of them earned accolades during his lifetime. Among these are the novels How Like An Angel (1934) and The Autobiography of a Cad (1938); the latter was reissued in the UK in 2001 in Prion Humour Classics. Macdonell also wrote six mystery novels under the name 'Neil Gordon', one of them in collaboration with Milward Kennedy. He also wrote under the pseudonym 'John Cameron'.

Macdonell was also a connoisseur of military history, and wrote a historical study called Napoleon and his Marshals (1934).

Macdonell wrote a number of plays for the theatre. These were mostly comedies, with titles like What Next, Baby? Or Shall I Go To Tanganyika, and were performed on the London stage. He also engaged in amateur theatrics himself, at least in the early part of his career. A review of an amateur production in Thursley, printed in The Times in January 1930, notes that he played his role with "immense gusto" which was "vastly to the taste of the audience". Macdonell also wrote "The crew of the Anaconda" in 1940, a Boys Own ripping yarn type tale.

Macdonell was a regular contributor to The Observer and The Bystander and also a well-known broadcaster for the BBC Empire Service. He was a keen sportsman and a first-rate golfer, representing the Old Wykehamists on a number of occasions.

He died suddenly in Oxford in 1941 at the age of 45. In his obituary, The Times called him "one of the leaders of the younger school of satirical novelists". He is buried at Wolvercote Cemetery in Oxford.

== Marriages ==
Macdonell was married twice. His first marriage lasted from 1926 to 1937, and gave him his only child Jenny. In July 1937, his wife Mona sued for divorce. According to the suit, Macdonell had committed adultery in a hotel in London the previous January. His second wife was Rose Paul-Schiff, whose family was associated with the banking firm of Warburg and who had fled to England from her native Vienna just before the Anschluss.

== Bibliography ==
- England, Their England (1933)
- How Like An Angel (1934)
- Napoleon and His Marshals (1934)
- A Visit to America (1935)
- Lords and Masters (1936)
- My Scotland (1937)
- Autobiography of a Cad (1939)
- The Spanish Pistol (1939)
- Flight from a Lady (1939)
- Crew of the Anaconda (1940)

As Robert Millward Kennnedy

- The Bleston Mystery (1928)

As Neil Gordon

- Professor's Poison (1928)
- The Factory on a Cliff (1928)
- The Silent Murders (1929)
- The Big Ben Alibi (1930)
- Murder in Earl's Court (1931)
- The Shakespeare Murders (1933)

As John Cameron

- The Seven Stabs (1929)
- Body Found Stabbed (1932)
