= Cricket Star =

Indian Television Series

- Created by: Emerging Media
- Country of origin: India

Cricket Star is an interactive, multimedia talent hunt for the world's best young cricketer. The first season of Cricket Star aired from December 2006 to March 2007 on DoorDarshan and Zee TV. The passion, drama and energy captured the hearts and minds of millions of viewers who followed the unravelling story on television, across the Internet and through their mobile phones. The winner, Sukhvir Singh, was awarded a contract with Leicestershire County Cricket Club.

Cricket Star India is the first programme in a 5-year international roll out, and the new series is scheduled to air in early 2008. This series will focus on the exciting new Twenty20 format, which Cricket Star helped introduce into India, as the Cricket Star contestants were put through a series of Twenty20 matches to test their skills. Public interest and excitement around the Twenty20 format continues to grow following India's surprise win of the inaugural World Twenty20 in South Africa in 2007. With the growth of this novel format of the game, there are new opportunities for cricketers with Twenty20 skills to shine.

The Cricket Star formula is:

- A nationwide application and screening process creates a shortlist of talented candidates
- Candidates are invited to attend auditions in their region
- Celebrity judges, national selectors and professional coaches select a final group
- Finalists spend up to 10 weeks in the Cricket Star Academy and are subjected to a televised series of unique mental and physical tests and a range of patented cricketing challenges
- Weekly televised cricket matches at the academy involving cricket celebrities will give the candidates a chance to shine
- Extended televised coverage will portray life at the academy, the interaction between hopefuls and insights into their passion for the game
- Based on the performance each week the judges will score each pupil. The public will vote by phone, online or text to eliminate a pupil each week until only two remain. The final selection will be made by millions of television viewers in a dramatic final episode.
