= William Goldwin =

English poet, schoolteacher, and vicar

William Goldwin (c.1682 – 1747 at Bristol) was an English schoolteacher and vicar who left his mark on cricket by creating the sport's earliest known work of literature. Goldwin, whose name is sometimes spelt "Goldwyn", wrote a poem of 95 competent and sometimes graceful lines of Latin hexameters on a rural cricket match. It was called In Certamen Pilae (On a Ball Game) and it was published in his Musae Juveniles in March 1706.

Little is known of Goldwin himself. He attended Eton and then graduated to King's College, Cambridge in 1700. He subsequently became a Master of Bristol Grammar School and was Vicar of St Nicholas' Church in Bristol until his death in 1747.
