= Max Hastings =

English journalist, editor, historian and author (born 1945)

Sir Max Hastings FRSL FRHistS
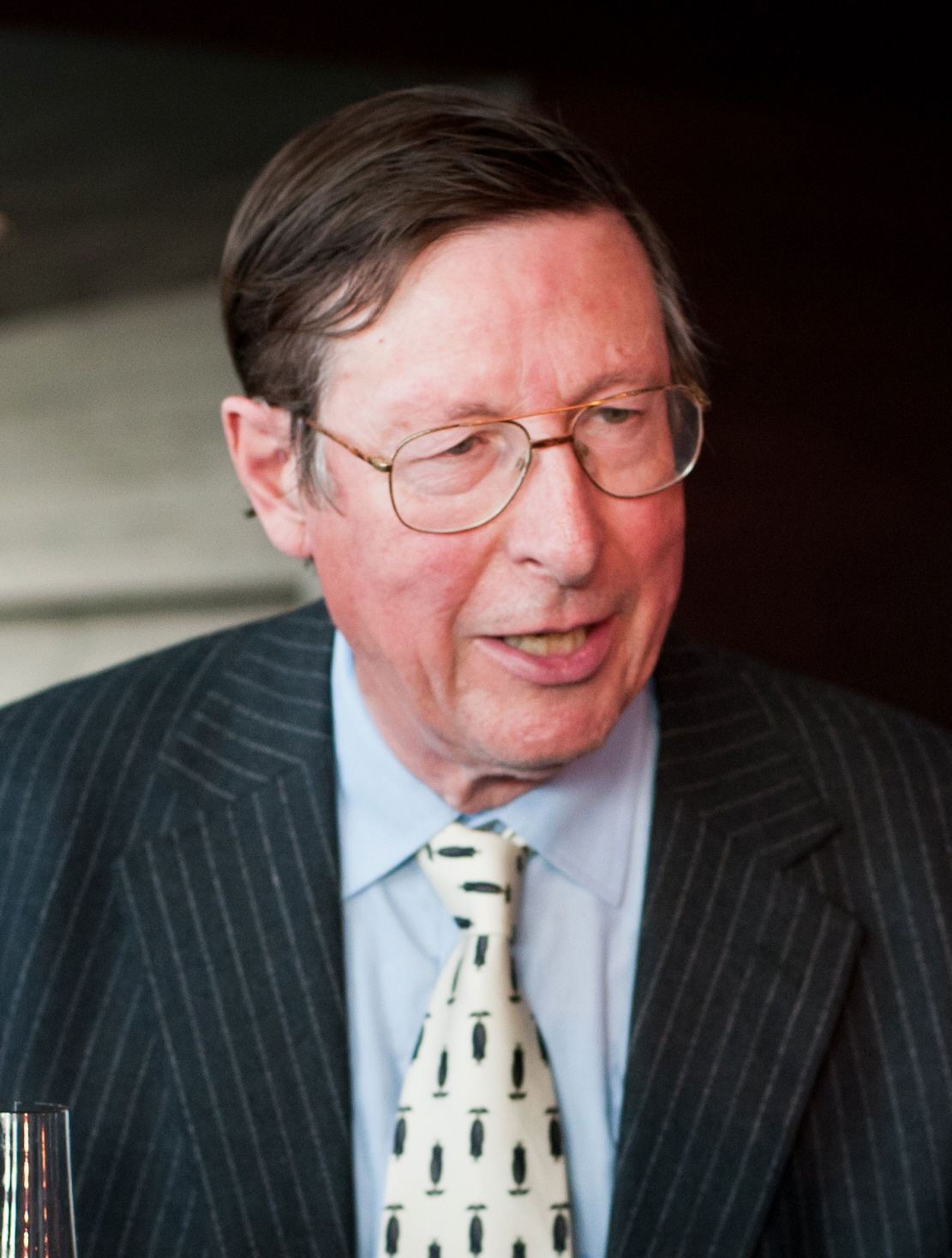
- Hastings in 2013
- Born: Max Hugh Macdonald Hastings; 28 December 1945 (age 80); Lambeth, London, England
- Education: Charterhouse
- Occupations: Journalist, editor, author
- Employers: BBC; Evening Standard; The Daily Telegraph
- Spouses: Patricia Edmondson (m. 1972; div. 1994); Penelope Levinson (m. 1999)
- Children: 3
- Parents: Macdonald Hastings (father); Anne Scott-James (mother)
- Relatives: Clare Hastings (sister)

Sir Max Hugh Macdonald Hastings (/ˈheɪstɪŋz/; born 28 December 1945) is a British journalist and military historian who has worked as a foreign correspondent for the BBC, editor-in-chief of The Daily Telegraph, and editor of the Evening Standard. He is also the author of thirty books, most significantly histories, which have won several major awards. Hastings currently writes a bimonthly column for Bloomberg Opinion and contributes to The Times and The Sunday Times.

== Early life ==
Hastings' parents were Macdonald Hastings, a journalist and correspondent, and Anne Scott-James, sometime editor of Harper's Bazaar. He was educated at Charterhouse and University College, Oxford, which he left after a year.

== Career ==
Hastings moved to the United States, spending a year (1967–68) as a Fellow of the World Press Institute, following which he published his first book, America, 1968: The Fire This Time, an account of the US in its tumultuous election year. He became a foreign correspondent and reported from more than sixty countries and eleven wars for BBC1's Twenty-Four Hours current affairs programme and for the Evening Standard in London.

Hastings was the first person accompanying the British Task Force to enter Port Stanley on the last day of the 1982 Falklands War. After ten years as editor and then editor-in-chief of The Daily Telegraph, he returned to the Evening Standard as editor in 1996 and remained there until his retirement in 2002. Hastings was appointed a Knight Bachelor in the 2002 Birthday Honours for services to journalism. He was elected a member of the political dining society known as The Other Club in 1993.

He has presented historical documentaries for the BBC and is the author of many books, including Bomber Command, which earned the Somerset Maugham Award for non-fiction in 1980. Both Overlord and The Battle for the Falklands won the Yorkshire Post Book of the Year prize. He was named Journalist of the Year and Reporter of the Year at the 1982 British Press Awards, and Editor of the Year in 1988. In 2010 he received the Royal United Services Institute's Westminster Medal for his "lifelong contribution to military literature", and the same year the Edgar Wallace Award from the London Press Club.

In 2012, he was awarded the US$100,000 Pritzker Military Library Literature Award, a lifetime achievement award for military writing, which includes an honorarium, citation and medallion, sponsored by the Chicago-based Tawani Foundation. Hastings is a Fellow of the Royal Society of Literature, and the Royal Historical Society. He was President of the Campaign to Protect Rural England from 2002 to 2007.

In his 2007 book Nemesis: The Battle for Japan, 1944–45 (known as Retribution in the United States), the chapter on Australia's role in the last year of the Pacific War was criticised by the chief of the Returned and Services League of Australia and one of the historians at the Australian War Memorial, for allegedly exaggerating discontent in the Australian Army. Dan van der Vat in The Guardian called it "even-handed", "refreshing" and "sensitive" and praised the language used. The Spectator called it "brilliant" and praised his telling of the human side of the story.

Hastings wrote a column for the Daily Mail between 2002 and 2008 and often contributes articles to other publications such as The Guardian, and The Sunday Times. He also currently writes a bimonthly column for Bloomberg Opinion.

== Personal life ==
Hastings lives near Hungerford, Berkshire, with his second wife, Penelope (née Levinson), whom he married in 1999. Hastings has a surviving son and daughter by his first wife, Patricia Edmondson, to whom he was married from 1972 until 1994. In 2000, his 27-year-old first son, Charles, died by suicide in Ningbo, China. He dedicated his book Nemesis: The Battle for Japan 1944–45, which was published in 2007, to Charles's memory.

== Political views ==
Hastings has at different times voted for all three major British political parties. He announced his support for the Conservative Party at the 2010 general election, having previously voted for the Labour Party at the 1997 and 2001 general elections. He said that "four terms are too many for any government" and described Gordon Brown as "wholly psychologically unfit to be Prime Minister".

In August 2014, Hastings was one of 200 public figures who were signatories to a letter to The Guardian opposing Scottish independence in the run-up to September's referendum on that issue.

In June 2019, Hastings described Boris Johnson, the Conservative Party leadership candidate, as "unfit for national office, because it seems he cares for no interest save his own fame and gratification ... [his] premiership will almost certainly reveal a contempt for rules, precedent, order and stability ... If the price of Johnson proves to be Corbyn, blame will rest with the Conservative party, which is about to foist a tasteless joke upon the British people – who will not find it funny for long." He continued along this line of argument throughout the Johnson premiership and he said that "the experiment in celebrity government to which the Conservative Party committed us has failed, and is seen by the world to have failed. The foremost task for a successor is to restore Britain's reputation as a serious country."

In his Bloomberg column on 14 February 2021, Hastings wrote that the United Kingdom's future was unlikely to be long-term. He advocated for a united Ireland but said he was against Scottish and Welsh independence. Hastings was criticised by journalist Huw Edwards for stating in the article that the Welsh language was of "marginal value" and that Wales could not succeed as an independent country because it was "dependent on English largesse".

In March 2021, Hastings wrote that the prospect of a showdown between the United States and China over Taiwan was becoming increasingly likely.

== Select bibliography ==
=== Reportage ===
- America 1968: The Fire this Time (Gollancz, 1969) ISBN 0-575-00234-4
- Ulster 1969: The Struggle for Civil Rights in Northern Ireland (Gollancz, 1970) ISBN 0-575-00482-7
- The Battle for the Falklands (with Simon Jenkins) (Michael Joseph, 1983) ISBN 0-7181-2228-3, (Norton, 1983) ISBN 0-393-01761-3

=== Biography ===
- Montrose: The King's Champion (Gollancz, 1977) ISBN 0-575-02226-4
- Yoni: Hero of Entebbe: Life of Yonathan Netanyahu (Weidenfeld & Nicolson, 1980) ISBN 0-297-77565-0

=== Autobiography ===
- Going to the Wars (Macmillan, 2000) ISBN 0-333-77104-4
- Editor: A Memoir (Macmillan, 2002) ISBN 0-333-90837-6
- Did You Really Shoot the Television?: A Family Fable (London, HarperPress, 2010) ISBN 978-0-00-727171-9

=== History ===
- Bomber Command (Michael Joseph, 1979) ISBN 0-7181-1603-8
- The Battle of Britain (with Len Deighton) (Jonathan Cape, 1980) ISBN 0-224-01826-4
- Das Reich: Resistance and the March of the Second SS Panzer Division Through France, June 1944 (Michael Joseph, 1981) ISBN 0-7181-2074-4, (Henry Holt & Co, 1982) ISBN 0-03-057059-X
- Overlord: D-Day and the Battle for Normandy (Simon & Schuster, 1984) ISBN 0-671-46029-3
- Victory in Europe: D-Day to VE-Day (Weidenfeld & Nicolson, 1985) ISBN 0-297-78650-4 (Little Brown & C, 1992) ISBN 0-316-81334-6
- The Korean War (Michael Joseph, 1987) ISBN 0-7181-2068-X, (Simon & Schuster, 1987) ISBN 0-671-52823-8
- Armageddon: The Battle for Germany 1944–45 (Macmillan, 2004) ISBN 0-333-90836-8
- Warriors: Exceptional Tales from the Battlefield (HarperPress [UK], 2005) ISBN 978-0-00-719756-9
- Nemesis: The Battle for Japan 1944–45 (HarperPress [UK], October 2007) ISBN 0-00-721982-2 (re-titled Retribution: The Battle for Japan, 1944–45 for US release Knopf ISBN 978-0-307-26351-3)
- Finest Years: Churchill as Warlord 1940–45 (London, HarperPress, 2009) ISBN 978-0-00-726367-7 (re-titled Winston's War: Churchill, 1940–1945 for US release by Knopf, 2010, ISBN 978-0-307-26839-6)
- All Hell Let Loose: The World At War 1939–1945 (London, HarperPress, 29 September 2011) ISBN 978-0-00-733809-2 (re-titled Inferno: The World At War, 1939–1945 for US release by Knopf, 1 November 2011, ISBN 978-0-307-27359-8. 729 pp)
- Catastrophe: Europe Goes to War 1914 (London, Knopf Press, 24 September 2013) ISBN 978-0307597052, 640 pp.
- The Secret War: Spies, Codes And Guerrillas 1939–45 (London: William Collins, 2015) ISBN 9780007503742
- Vietnam: An Epic Tragedy 1945–1975 (William Collins, 2018) ISBN 978-0062405678
- Chastise: The Dambusters Story 1943 (William Collins, 2019) ISBN 9780008280529
- Operation Pedestal: The Fleet that Battled to Malta 1942 (William Collins, 2021) ISBN 978-0008364946
- Abyss: The Cuban Missile Crisis 1962 (William Collins, 2022) ISBN 978-0008364991
- Operation Biting: The 1942 Parachute Assault to Capture Hitler's Radar (William Collins, 2024) ISBN 978-0008642167
- Sword: D-Day Trial by Battle (William Collins, 2025) ISBN 978-0008699758
- Plunder: The Last of the War in Europe 1945 (William Collins, 2026) ISBN 978-0008778231

=== Countryside writing ===
- Outside Days (Michael Joseph, 1989) ISBN 0-7181-3330-7
- Scattered Shots (Macmillan, 1999) ISBN 0-333-77103-6
- Country Fair (HarperCollins, October 2005) ISBN 0-00-719886-8. 288 pp

=== Anthology ===
- The Oxford Book of Military Anecdotes (ed.) (Oxford University Press, 1985) ISBN 0-19-214107-4
- Soldiers: Great Stories of War and Peace (William Collins, 2021) ISBN 978-0008454227

=== Journalism ===
- Hastings, Max (16 January 2010). "The Tory defence policy will be simple: cut, brutally". The Spectator.

== Filmography ==
- Wellington Bomber, 2010 BBC documentary
- The Necessary War, 2014 BBC documentary on the Centennial of the beginning of the First World War.

== See also ==
- Clan Macdonald of Sleat

Media offices
Preceded by Bill Deedes	Editor of The Daily Telegraph; 1986–1995	Succeeded by Charles Moore
Preceded by Stewart Steven	Editor of the Evening Standard; 1996–2002	Succeeded by Veronica Wadley
Non-profit organization positions
Preceded by Prunella Scales	President of the Campaign to Protect Rural England; 2002–2007	Succeeded by Bill Bryson
