= More Than a Game: The Story of Cricket's Early Years =

- Author: John Major
- Language: English
- Publisher: HarperCollins
- Publication date: 2007
- Publication place: United Kingdom
- Media type: Print
- Pages: 400
- ISBN: 9780007280117

More Than a Game: The Story of Cricket's Early Years is a 2007 book about the history of cricket written by former British prime minister John Major. It was published by HarperCollins.

== Background ==
John Major had been known to have a life long love of cricket. After losing the 1997 United Kingdom general election, he went to the Oval for an afternoon of cricket. Major would become the President of Surrey County Cricket Club from 2000 to 2001 (and Honorary Life Vice-president since 2002). The launch of the book was done at the Oval in a room named after himself.

== Content ==
Major traces the history of the game from its nebulae origins in the medieval games "creag" and "club-ball", through its denunciation by the clergy and violence in the 17th and 18th century, to the exuberance of Victorian players, concluding at the end of the first world war.

== Reception ==
Roger Mosey, writing in The Guardian found that Major's enjoyment of the game shone through his history of it, and particularly enjoyed Major's personalisation the narrative. Historian Dominic Sandbrook, in The Daily Telegraph, was also positive of the book, finding it "very charming and quintessentially English". Jack Williams, of The Independent, was more critical, finding that the biographical approach taken by Major resulted in "a potted history of a particular time in a chapter's first pages without any explanation of the effects of social and economic changes on cricket" and opining that academic historians would find the background history to be simplistic.
