= G. D. Martineau =

English cricket writer (1897–1976)

Gerald Durani Martineau (1897 – 29 May 1976) was a prolific English cricket writer.

He was born in Lahore and educated at Charterhouse School and Royal Military College, Sandhurst. He was a captain in the Royal Sussex Regiment in World War I and authored the History of the Royal Sussex Regiment (1953). He worked for many years as a schoolmaster.

Martineau's notable works on cricket include Bat, Ball, Wicket and All (1950), on the history of cricket implements; They Made Cricket (1956), on innovators in cricket from 1727 up to the first television broadcast in 1938; The Valiant Stumper, on the history of wicket-keeping; and The Field is Full of Shades (1946), on early cricketers in the period before 1800. John Arlott wrote that Martineau's "sympathy with his subject is sufficiently clear-headed to enable him to write of the early cricketers without sentimentality but with an understanding rarely equalled since Nyren". Martineau also contributed to E. W. Swanton's World of Cricket and The Cricketer magazine.

His Wisden obituary opines that his books "were not works of much original research" but, "pleasantly written, they were ideally calculated to arouse the interest of the novice and spur him on to try for himself the masterpieces". Martineau died at Lyme Regis in 1976 at the age of 79 after a long illness.
