= London Mercury =

The London Mercury was the name of several periodicals published in London from the 17th to the 20th centuries. The earliest was a newspaper that appeared during the Exclusion Bill crisis; it lasted only 56 issues (1682). (Earlier periodicals had employed similar names: Mercurius Politicus, 1659; The Impartial Protestant Mercury, 1681.) Successor periodicals published as The London Mercury during the 18th and 19th centuries.

== 20th century ==
In the 20th century, The London Mercury was the major monthly literary journal that published from 1919 to 1939. J. C. Squire served as editor from November 1919 to September 1934; Rolfe Arnold Scott-James succeeded Squire as editor from October 1934 to April 1939. The Mercury purchased the smaller title, The Bookman for £800 in 1935. By late 1938 the magazine was losing money heavily on a revenue of £4000 and efforts were being made to sell it, with approaches being made to the publishers Methuen, Rolls Publishing Company and Brendin Publishing Company, owners of the rival and more successful title Life and Letters To-day. Eventually a deal was agreed in March 1939 with Brendin, for £1000 clear, with the London Mercury and The Bookman being incorporated to Life and Letters To-day.

== Authors published ==
J. C. Squire published a wide variety of serious contemporary literature, including poetry by Robert Frost, Robert Graves, Richmond Lattimore, Siegfried Sassoon, Conrad Aiken, Hilaire Belloc, and William Butler Yeats, among many others.

The London Mercury also carried short fiction by several well-known authors, including Virginia Woolf, Katherine Mansfield, J. B. Priestley, John Betjeman, Margaret Irwin, Gerald Bullett, Henry Williamson and Karel Čapek, and published literary criticism by W. J. Turner, John Freeman and Edward Shanks. The London Mercury took a conservative political position.

In 2002 the London Mercury title was adopted by an online newspaper.
