= Taiwanese superstitions =

Superstitions

Taiwanese superstitions are widely believed among the Taiwanese population as these superstitions stem from legends, folklore, traditions, customs that have been practiced throughout generations, and many more.

== Societal superstitions ==
- If students trim their nails during the examination period, they will end up with failing grades for their subjects.
- When people point at the Moon, they will bring bad luck upon themselves. It is said that the Moon Goddess Chang’e finds the action of people pointing at the moon to be disrespectful, and as such she would sever the index finger of the person who pointed at the Moon. In modern times the superstition usually states that the moon will cut behind your ear.
- During a meal, it is frowned upon for people to leave their chopsticks sticking up vertically in rice, be it leftover or a new bowl of rice. The image of having chopsticks sticking up vertically in rice is similar to the image of having incense sticks being put up when the Chinese are offering meals to their ancestors’ ghosts. Therefore, this similarity would come across as
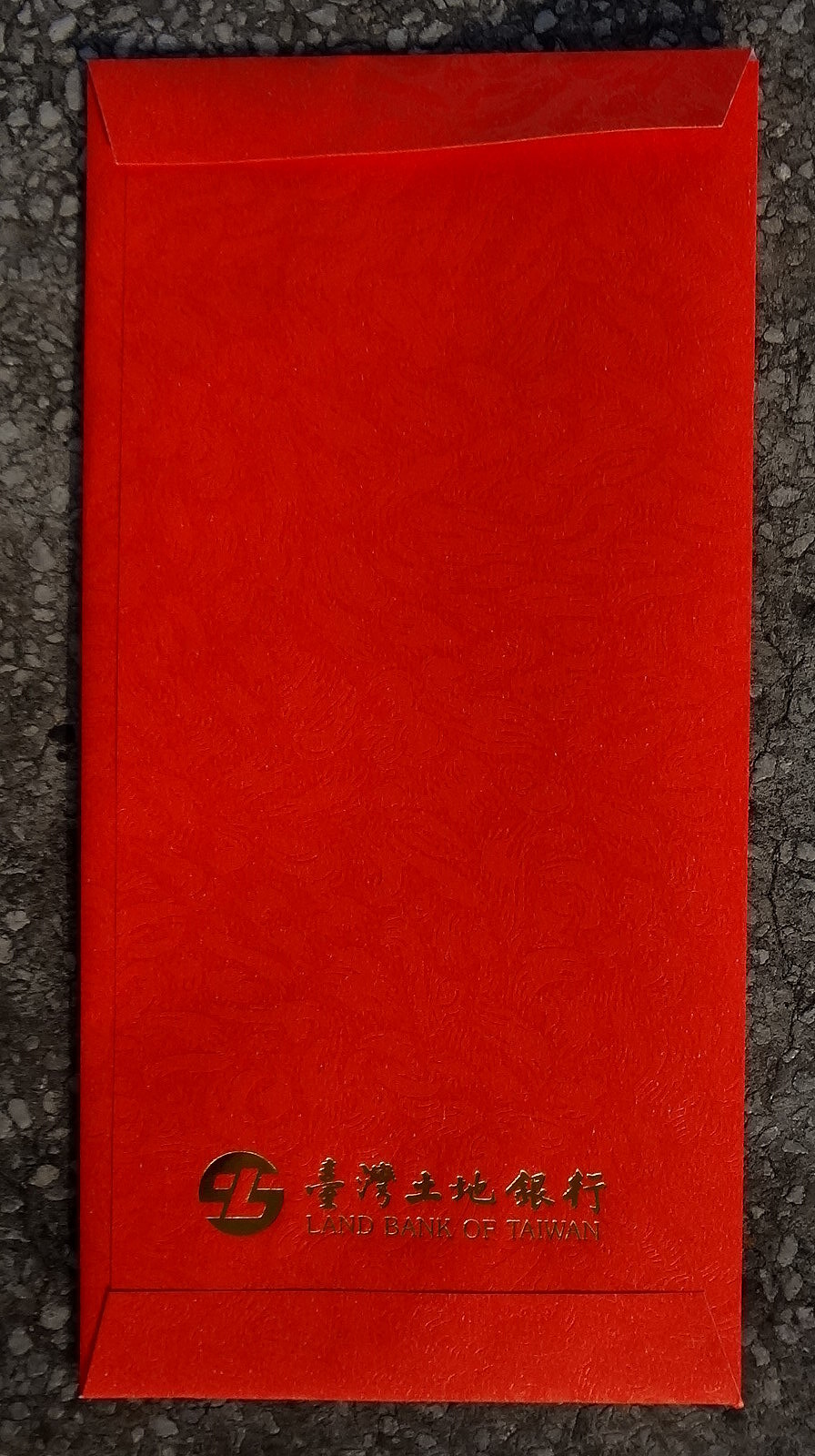
  According to Taiwanese superstitions, it is believed that if someone picks up an unattended red envelope, he is required to marry the deceased woman of the family who left the red packet on the streets.
  bringing bad luck or “unwanted spirits” to the owner of the restaurant.
- Do not pick up an unattended red envelope that has been left on the street. Usually, there will be money inside these unattended red envelopes and they have been left on the street intentionally. These envelopes are placed on the streets intentionally by the parents of an adult woman who has passed away. The intention behind this action is to have a man pick it up, which would require him to marry the spirit of the deceased woman. If the man refuses to wed her, it is believed that he will be haunted by the woman’s crying spirit until he agrees to marry her.
- When people are gambling, do not pat their backs. The Chinese character for back (背) has the same pronunciation as “bad luck,” so when gamblers are pat on their backs when gambling, it is believed that the action of patting their backs would cause them to be unlucky.
- Before entering paid lodging be sure to knock and say, “Sorry for the intrusion, but please let me stay for a few days.” Then, politely step to the side so that potential occupants living in that room will have a chance to exit. It is believed that if people do not announce their intended visit, the potential spirits living in that room would feel like their space has been invaded and thus might bring bad luck to the people living in that room.
- Tetraphobia is common throughout east Asia, including Taiwan, because in several varieties of Chinese, the character for four (四) is pronounced similarly to the character for death (死).

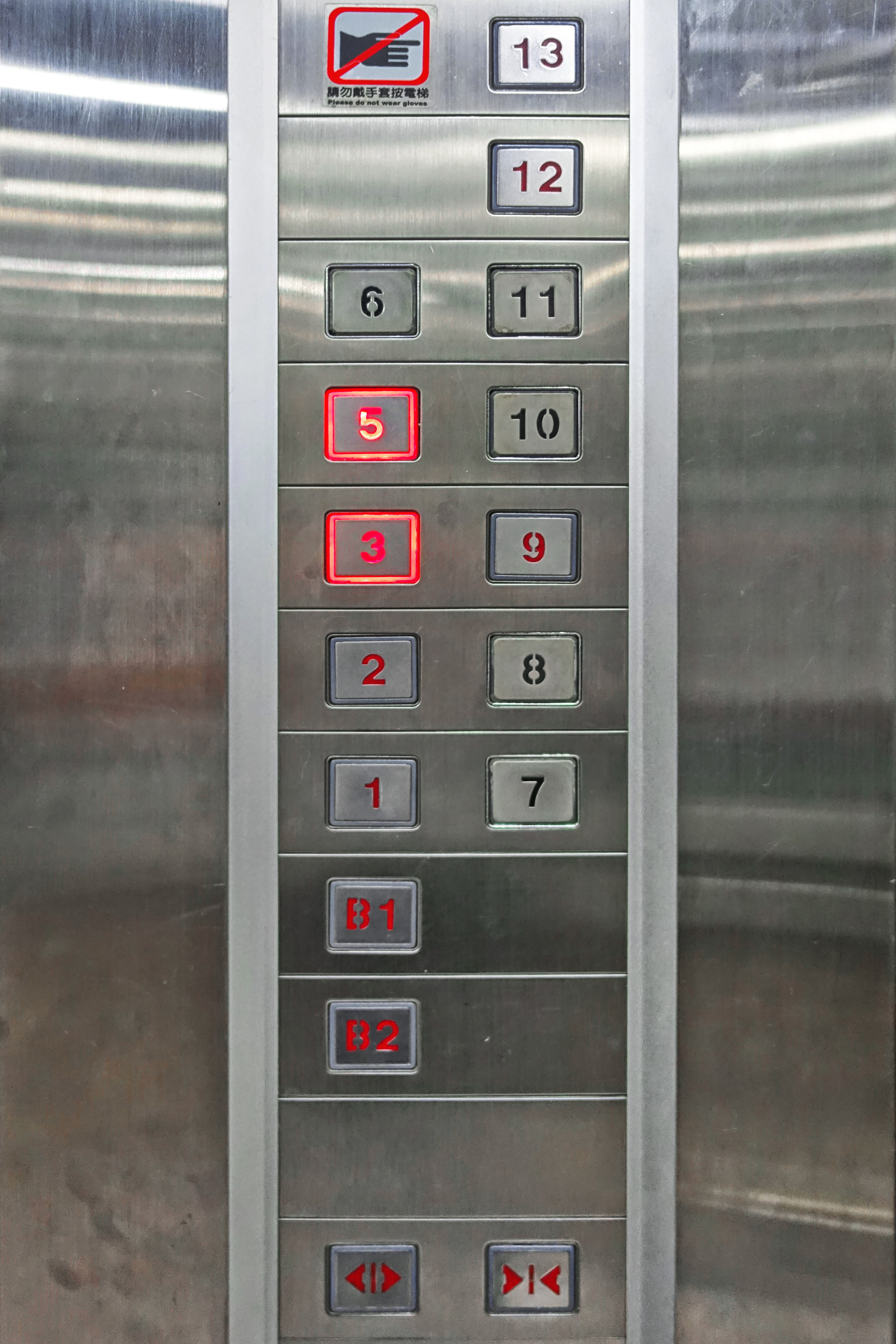
An elevator in Taiwan that is missing a button for the fourth floor of a building.

- Within science and technology-related industries in Taiwan, it is believed that placing coconut butter-flavored Kuai Kuai branded snacks in contact with machines will help them run without errors, as the Chinese character 乖; guāi, means obedient. The coconut butter flavored snacks are packaged in green bags, the color of which additionally signify that everything is in working order. In other contexts, Kuai Kuai packaged in yellow and red bags signify wealth and love, respectively, but are avoided in technological circles.

== Gift-giving superstitions ==
Taiwanese people exchange gifts amongst one another on many occasions as a sign of respect and good faith. They should understand the taboos and superstitions behind several gift giving traditions so that they do not unintentionally disrespect the other party.

If a person accidentally gifts someone a taboo gift, the recipient is required to give him/her a small amount of money, such as a $1 coin. This small gesture would indicate that the inauspicious gift was technically bought and not gifted; therefore, any unfortunate superstition behind it will be rescinded.

People are expected to refrain from gifting the following:

- Clocks

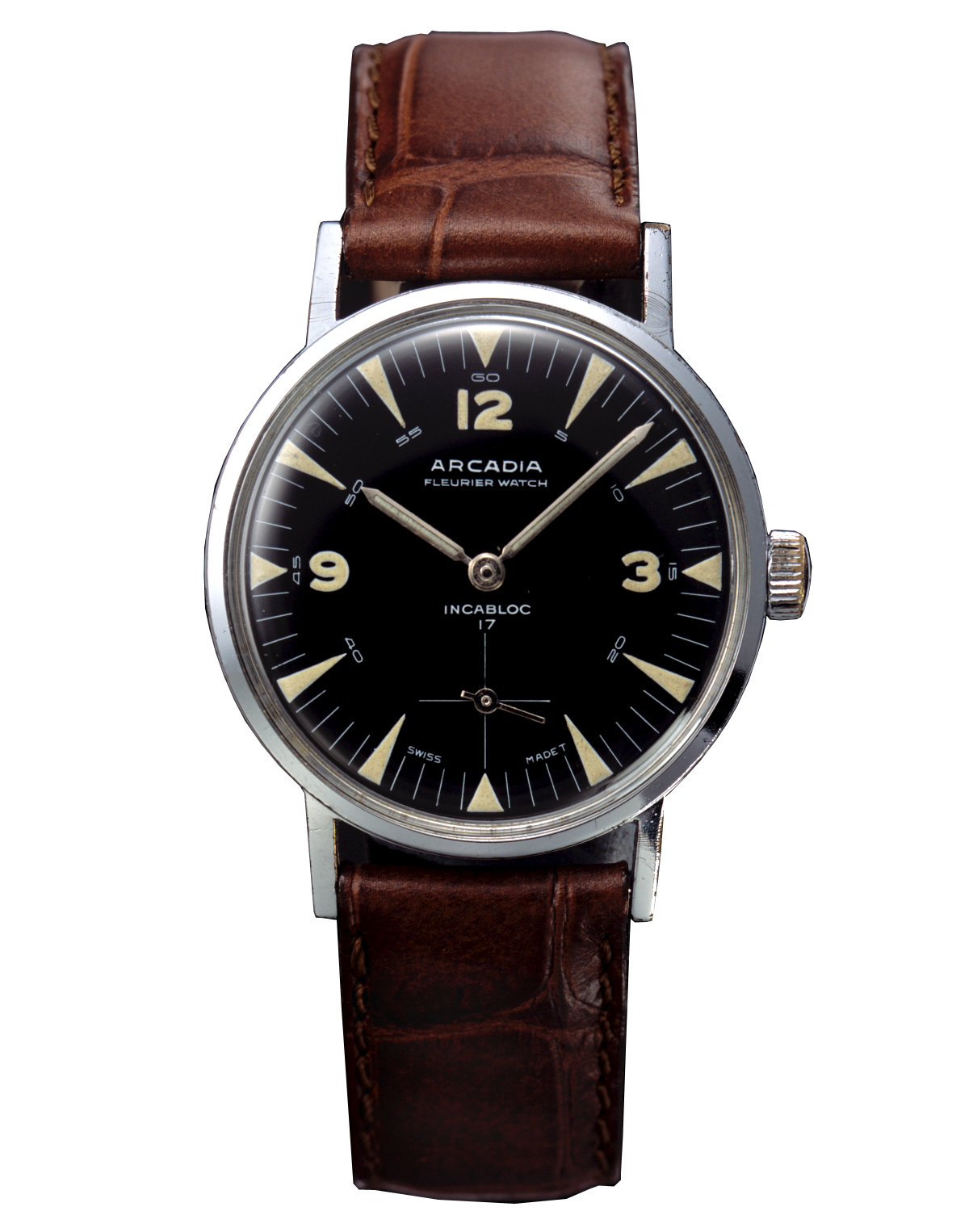
In the Taiwanese culture, gifting clocks and/or watches could be seen as wishing ill upon the recipient.

The Chinese phrase for “to give someone a clock” has an underlying meaning of “sending someone off,” otherwise interpreted as wishing death upon the person that was gifted clocks.

- Handkerchiefs

Handkerchiefs are usually avoided as an option when thinking about gifts as handkerchiefs are generally used to wipe away tears during sad occasions. Henceforth, gifting handkerchiefs is believed to bring bad fortune upon the recipient due to the downcast association handkerchiefs come along with.

- Sharp objects such as knives or scissors

It is widely accepted that gifting sharp objects such as knives or scissors would come across as the person who prepared this gift to be subtly indicating the intent to sever his/her relationship with the recipient. This is because sharp objects are usually used to cut and separate objects, thus transcending this function into a form of superstition.

- Red pens

Even though pens are considered as acceptable gifts, it is frowned upon to gift pens with red ink. Red is generally an auspicious colour in the Taiwanese culture, but in terms of red ink, it symbolises blood. Therefore, writing a person’s name in red would come across as wishing grave injuries or even death upon them.

== Feng shui ==
Another big superstition in the Taiwanese culture is feng shui, also known as geomancy. Feng shui superstitions have been playing such an influential role in Taiwan’s society that many people hire feng shui experts to determine the proper orientation of buildings, rooms, doors, and other architecture and/or furniture when they purchase properties or decorate the interiors of their home.

== Superstitions and folklore ==
Superstitions play a huge role in moulding many Taiwanese peoples’ lifestyles, especially during festivities as many superstitions stem from ancient folklore that have been told through generations.

=== Lunar New Year ===
Lunar New Year, also known as Chinese New Year, celebrates the beginning of a new year according to the Chinese calendar. During this period of about 15 days, many Taiwanese people celebrate its traditions and more importantly, strictly adhere to the superstitions that come with this occasion.

As it is believed that on the first day of Lunar New Year, various gods travel back to heaven to pay respect to the Jade Emperor as well as provide reports on household affairs on Earth, locals are required to honour these gods by burning ritualistic paper money. Furthermore, according to legends, it is believed that during the New Year, a monstrous beast known as Nian would appear and wreak havoc on local villages. The wreckage caused by Nian was only stopped when the colour red was placed everywhere, and fireworks and loud noises were set off to scare the beast away.

As such, it is now tradition that during the first day of Lunar New Year, fireworks and firecrackers are set off with the intention to scare away any bad luck, spirits, and/or energies. In addition, as the colour red represents auspiciousness and good fortune, it is believed that wearing red and having red decorations in peoples’ houses will bring about great fortune.

Several other superstitions followed by Taiwanese people during Lunar New Year are:

- Pay off debts before Lunar New Year begins

It is widely believed that if people do not settle any debts or grudges before Lunar New Year begins, they will have a year of poor wealth and luck in the year ahead.

- Major spring cleaning is to be done before the first day of Lunar New Year

According to Feng shui, having a clean and uncluttered house allows energy to flow smoother, which will provide prosperity to the inhabitants. It is also believed that by having a thorough cleansing of unwanted objects and the cleaning of the house, it will remove any bad luck and energy that have been accumulated over the past year. In other words, major spring cleaning before the first day of Lunar New Year will provide people with a fresh and clean start to begin a new year.

- Replace any withering plants with new ones

Many Taiwanese people believe that plants provide live energy, and where there is live energy, there’s cleansing and circulation of good energy within the environment. And where there is a withering plant, there is stagnant and unlucky energy.

- Stay up late on the eve of Lunar New Year

As many believe that the tradition of staying up late on the day before Lunar New Year is to bless their parents with longevity, the superstition behind this practice stems from the legend of Nian attacking ancient Chinese villages. According to the legend, villagers would keep the streets and more importantly, their homes well-light in order to keep Nian away. So, staying up late on the eve of Lunar New Year and keeping the lights on is now a customary practice to keep evil spirits out.

- Never throw out garbage on the first day of Lunar New Year

As Lunar New Year commences, it is believed that people are blessed with a fresh start to the new year, so if people were to throw out garbage on the first day of Lunar New Year, it would mean that they are throwing out the good fortune, luck, and energies that the New Year brings them.

- Do not wash your hair during the first day of Lunar New Year

The Chinese character for hair (髮) has a similar pronunciation as the Chinese character for “prosper” (發). As such, it is frowned upon for people to wash their hair during the first day of Lunar New Year as it would be seen as washing their prosperity for the year away.

- Never sweep during the first few days of Lunar New Year

The action of sweeping is believed to be synonymous with sweeping good fortune out of the house.

- Never hold any sharp objects, such as knives and scissors, during the first few days of the Lunar New Year

With the exception of cooking, it is forbidden for people to use any sharp objects during the first few days of the Lunar New Year. Since knives, scissors, and other sharp objects are generally used to sever objects, using sharp objects during the first few days of the Lunar New Year is believed to sever any good luck the New Year would have brought.

- Avoid bad language and topics about death

As it is with other auspicious occasions, the usage of bad language and talk of death is considered taboo as many Taiwanese people believe that any talk of inauspicious events would curse the speaker with bad luck.

- Serve fish during meals during these 15 days

As the Chinese word for fish (魚) is pronounced as “yu,” which has the same pronunciation as the Chinese word for “surplus” (餘), it is essential for people to eat fish during the New Year and other auspicious days as it would bring about good fortune and luck. However, people are expected to purposely leave some portions like the tail or head of the fish at the end of their meals as this indicates that they will have a surplus or abundance of good fortune in the coming year.

=== Ghost Festival ===
In Chinese numerology, the number 7 is considered inauspicious when linked to the Ghost Festival, which begins on the fifteenth night of the seventh month. Several taboos are observed during this time.

- People should avoid swimming, and bodies of water, so that evil spirits cannot drown the living, and gain a second chance at life. Water-based activities, such as showering, should not be performed after midnight. Maintenance of personal hygiene, such as the combing of hair, should not take place after midnight either, as the use of mirrors could reveal the presence of ghosts. However, it is considered important to care for hair, because spirits may consider a disheveled-looking person a fellow ghost. Yin forces abound near midnight, so birthdays should not be celebrated then, as ghosts could appear immediately after candles are extinguished.
- Going out alone at night should be avoided, especially for young people, as they are more susceptible to spirit possession. One should avoid capture by phantom drivers by not taking the last available iteration of public transportation.
- Whistling, particularly after dark, is not advised, because whistling is believed to attract evil spirits. Wind chimes should not be hung, as they sound similar to the ringing of souls, the sound of which lures ghosts.
- Attendees of a Taiwanese opera show should not sit in the front row, because the first row is reserved for spirits.
- Picking up money from the ground brings bad luck. Reaching for dropped joss paper is considered an insult to the spirits.
- Responses to shoulder taps should include turning the entire body. Turning just the head extinguishes one of the two protective flames that sit on the shoulders of the living.
- Do not kill insects that rarely appear in residential areas, as it is believed that ancestors visit relatives after reincarnation as a rare insect.
- Do not hang clothes outside to dry, because spirits are likely to wear them for warmth or to enter the house in disguise.
- Do not lean against walls, as it is believed that ghosts congregate near walls to keep cool.
- Urinating on trees will anger tree gods.
- Avoid completing major life milestones during the month, such as marriage, buying a house or car, starting a business, and scheduled hospital visits, such as for surgery.
- Consumption of horror media should be avoided, as it depletes yang energy. When discussing ghosts is necessary, refer to them as "good brothers" or "good sisters".
- Avoid opening umbrellas indoors. The action is believed to attract yin energy as ghosts gather around for protection from the sun. Additionally, because the Chinese character for umbrella (傘) and scatter (散) are homophones, the use of umbrellas indoors is thought to scatter one's wealth and family.
- Colors in Chinese culture can be considered auspicious or inauspicious, and people avoid wearing monochrome outfits of black, red, or white.
- It is suggested that one go to a temple to make offerings in exchange for protection from ghosts. If any offering is disturbed, apologize to both the living and the dead. Amulets depicting Guan Yu or Zhong Kui may be worn for further protection.
- Buddhists in Taiwan practice vegetarianism during the festival.
