= Canon (fiction) =

Continuity between different fictional works

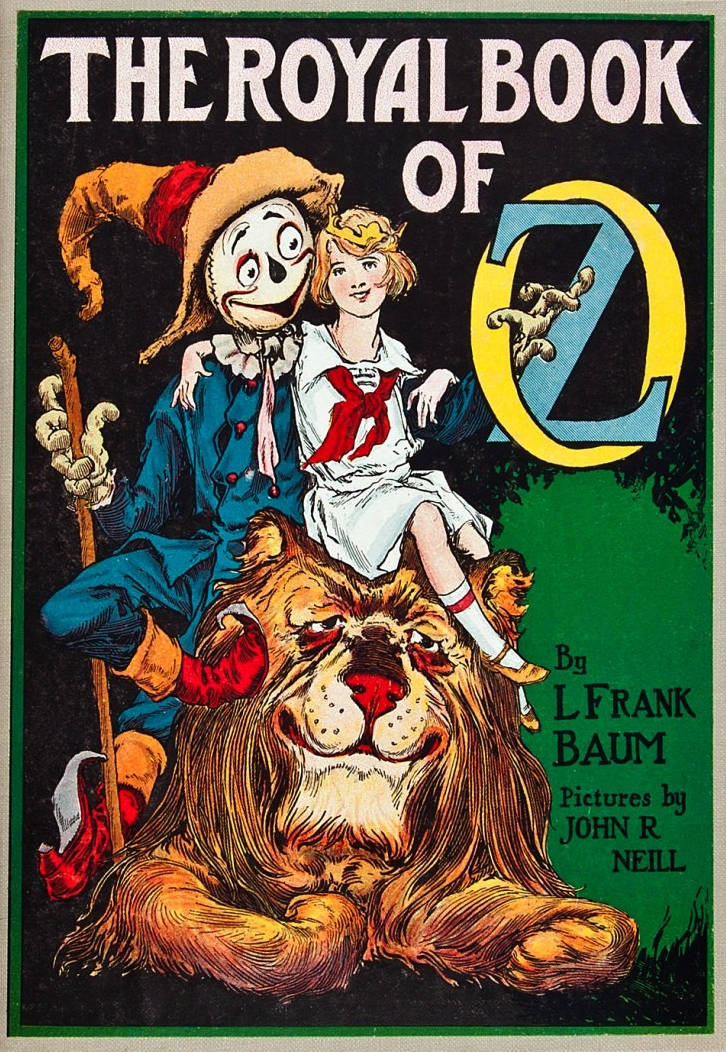
The Royal Book of Oz, designated as a canonical work in the Oz series by original publisher Reilly & Lee. It was written entirely by Ruth Plumly Thompson in 1921 after the death of original series writer L. Frank Baum in 1919.

The canon of a work of fiction is "the body of works taking place in a particular fictional world that are widely considered to be official or authoritative; [especially] those created by the original author or developer of the world". Canon is contrasted with or used as the basis for derivative works, including fan fiction.

== Canonicity ==
There is no consensus regarding who has the authority to decide what is or is not canonical, with copyright holders usually declaring themselves the authorities when they want to erase or retcon materials that were approved by the setting's original creator (with Star Wars being an example). The definition of canon is of particular importance with regard to reboots or re-imaginings of established franchises, such as the Star Trek 2009 remake, because of the ways in which it influences the viewer experience.

=== Examples ===
The official Star Trek website describes the Star Trek canon as "the events that take place within the episodes and movies", referring to the live-action television series and films, with Star Trek: The Animated Series having long existed in a nebulous gray area of canonicity. Events, characters, and storylines from tie-in novels, comic books, and video games are explicitly excluded from the Star Trek canon, but the site notes that elements from these sources have been subsequently introduced into the television series, and says that "canon is not something set in stone".

During George Lucas's time with the franchise, the Star Wars canon was divided into discrete tiers that incorporated the Expanded Universe (EU), with continuity tracked by Lucasfilm creative executive Leland Chee. Higher-tier and newer material abrogated lower-tier and older material in case of contradiction. The live-action theatrical films, the 2008 The Clone Wars TV series and its debut film, and statements by Lucas himself were at the top of this hierarchy; such works invariably superseded EU material in case of contradiction. The EU itself was further divided into several descending levels of continuity. After Disney's acquisition of the franchise, Lucasfilm designated all Expanded Universe material published before 25 April 2014 (other than the first six theatrical films and the 2008 The Clone Wars film and TV series) as the non-canonical "Legends" continuity. Material released since this announcement is a separate canonical timeline from the original George Lucas Canon, with all narrative development overseen by the Lucasfilm Story Group.

The makers of Doctor Who have generally avoided making pronouncements about canonicity, with Russell T Davies explaining that he does not think about the concept for the Doctor Who television series or its spin-offs.

The television series The Simpsons has as an example of non-canonical material the Treehouse of Horror episodes, a series of Halloween-themed specials with several stories that take place outside the show's normal continuity.

Productions under Walt Disney Animation Studios are considered by The Walt Disney Company as the canonical stories under the company's "Disney" brand. Therefore, sequels, prequels, television series, or other related media produced by other studios of the company (as is the case of Disneytoon Studios and Disney Television Animation productions that serve as a continuity of the films), and events in other media like books or video games, are ignored within the main Disney brand, focused on productions under Walt Disney Animation Studios, thus other productions and media being considered non-canonical events.

Several anime television series adapted from manga stories count with some extra episodes with original stories that are not part of the original manga, often being referred to as "filler episodes," being outside of the canon of their source material.

== Additional works ==
"The Field Bazaar" was rediscovered and reprinted by A. G. Macdonell in 1934.

=== Other writers ===
The canonical status of some works by the original writer but not the same publisher, such as "The Field Bazaar", may be debated. This is because copyright used to be exercised by the publisher of the work of literature rather than the author. Campaigning by Victor Hugo led to the Berne Convention which introduced author's rights.

However, sometimes in literature, original writers have not approved works as canon, but original publishers or literary estates of original writers posthumously approve subsequent works as canon, continuation novels such as The Royal Book of Oz (1921) (by original publisher), Porto Bello Gold (1924) (by estate), and Heidi Grows Up (1938) (by estate).

==== Late 20th century ====
In film and television it is common that the original writer does not decide what is canon. In literature, the estate of H. G. Wells authorised sequels by Stephen Baxter, The Massacre of Mankind (2017) and The Time Ships (1995). Scarlett was a 1991 sequel to Gone with the Wind authorised by the estate.

==== 21st century ====
In 2010, the Conan Doyle estate authorised Young Sherlock Holmes and The House of Silk.

Sequels to the stories by P G Wodehouse about the butler Jeeves were sanctioned by Wodehouse's estate for Jeeves and the Wedding Bells (2013) by Sebastian Faulks and Jeeves and the King of Clubs (2018) by Ben Schott.

The Monogram Murders (2014) by Sophie Hannah is a sequel to Hercule Poirot novels authorised by the Agatha Christie estate.

== Fanon ==
Fan fiction is never regarded as canonical. However, certain ideas may become influential or widely accepted within fan communities, who refer to such ideas as fanon, a portmanteau of fan and canon. Similarly, the term headcanon is used to describe a fan's personal interpretation of a fictional universe.

== See also ==
- Alternative universe (fan fiction) – Plot device in fiction
- Complete works – Collection of all creative works of a person or group
- Catalogue raisonné – Comprehensive, annotated listing of all the known artworks by an artist
- Continuity (fiction) – Consistency of a narrative
- Expanded universe – Non-linear additions with consistency to the fictional universe
- Fictional universe – Self-consistent fictional setting
- Shared universe – Type of universe in which works written by multiple writers are set
- Parallel universes in fiction – Plot device in fiction
- Reset button technique – Plot device that resets continuity in works of fiction
- Sequel – Continuation of a previous work
- Text corpus – Digital collections of natural language data
- Middle-earth canon – Works of Tolkien set in Middle-earth
- Retroactive continuity – Literary device in fictional storytelling
- Canon of Sherlock Holmes – Things confirmed about Sherlock Holmes in Sir Arthur Conan Doyle's stories
