= Superstition in Great Britain =

Superstitions have been present in Great Britain throughout its history. Early modern Britain was a superstitious society, and the superstitions were documented at the time. The belief in witches, the devil, ghosts, apparitions, and magical healing was founded on superstitions. In modern Britain, according to a 2003 survey carried out during the National Science Week and a 2007 poll conducted by Ipsos and Ben Schott of Schott's Almanac, knocking on wood is the most popular superstition in Britain, with "crossing fingers for good luck" coming after it.

== History ==
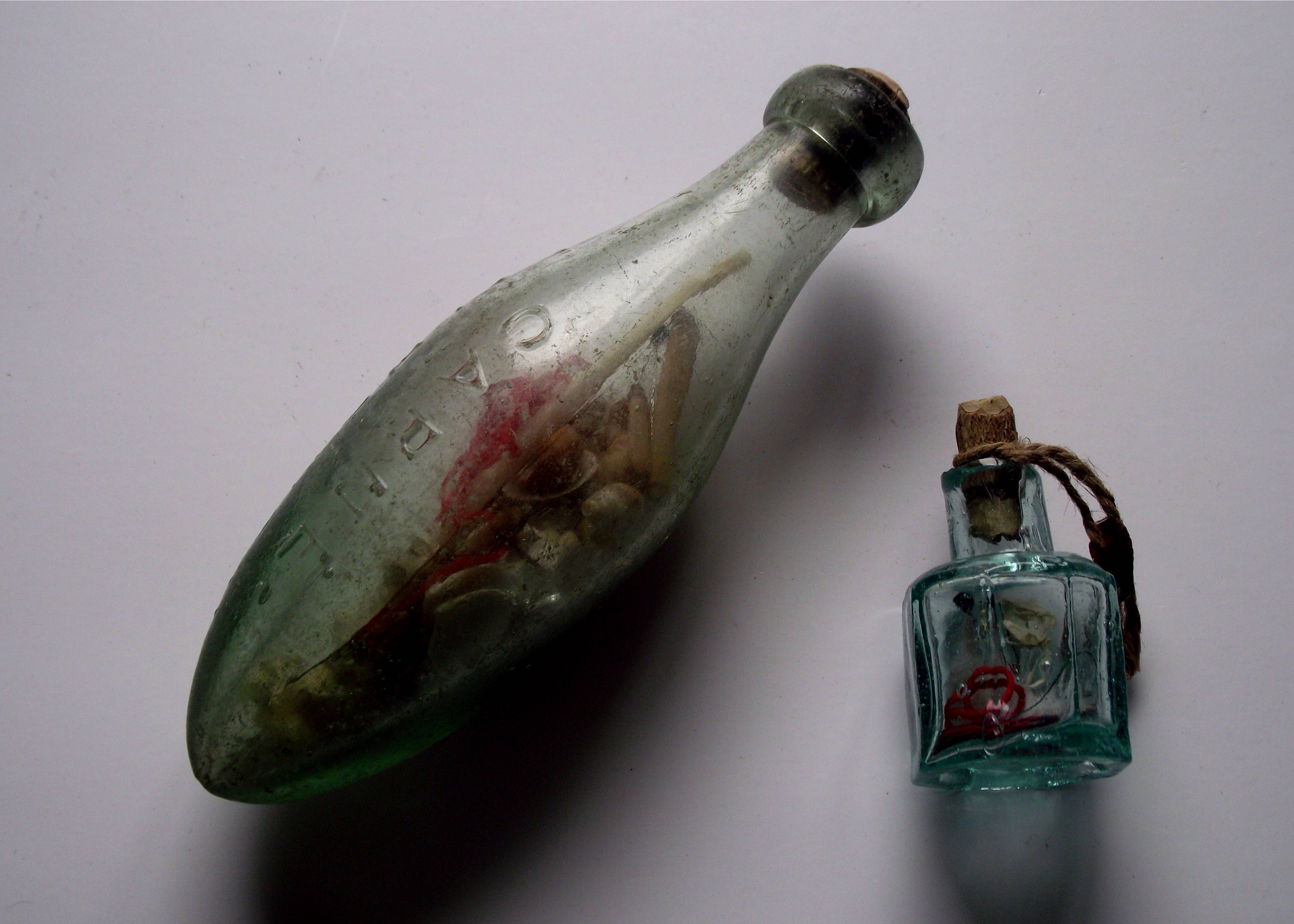
Witch bottles

According to Frederick Alexander Durham writing in 1892, the Britons at the time were in some ways just as superstitious as their ancestors. According to the Andrew D. McCarthy, the finding and identification of more than 200 witch bottles reinforces the view that early modern Britain was a superstitious society, where evil could be fended off with a mixture of urine and hair.

The belief in witches, the devil, ghosts, apparitions, and magical healing was founded on superstitions. Regardless of the fact that common superstitions were frequently criticized, their propagandist usefulness could not be overlooked. John Clare, an English poet, viewed superstition as an old tradition left behind by previous civilizations. He said in 1825 that these beliefs were "as old as England" and that, although being difficult to trace historically, superstitions are "as common to every memory as the seasons, and as familiar to children even as the rain and spring flowers." He said:

Superstition lives longer than books; it is engrafted on the human mind till it becomes a part of its existence; and is carried from generation to generation on the stream of eternity, with the proudest of fames, untroubled with the insect encroachments of oblivion which books are infested with.

— John Clare

Superstitions were documented in early modern Britain history. This task was a cultural and intellectual obsession in Victorian and Edwardian Britain. Scholars, preachers, and educated ladies devoted their lives to collecting odd items from a way of life they thought was on the point of extinction. Studies of late medieval England suggest that English kings often rejected their astrologers' forecasts and counsel.

== Superstitions ==
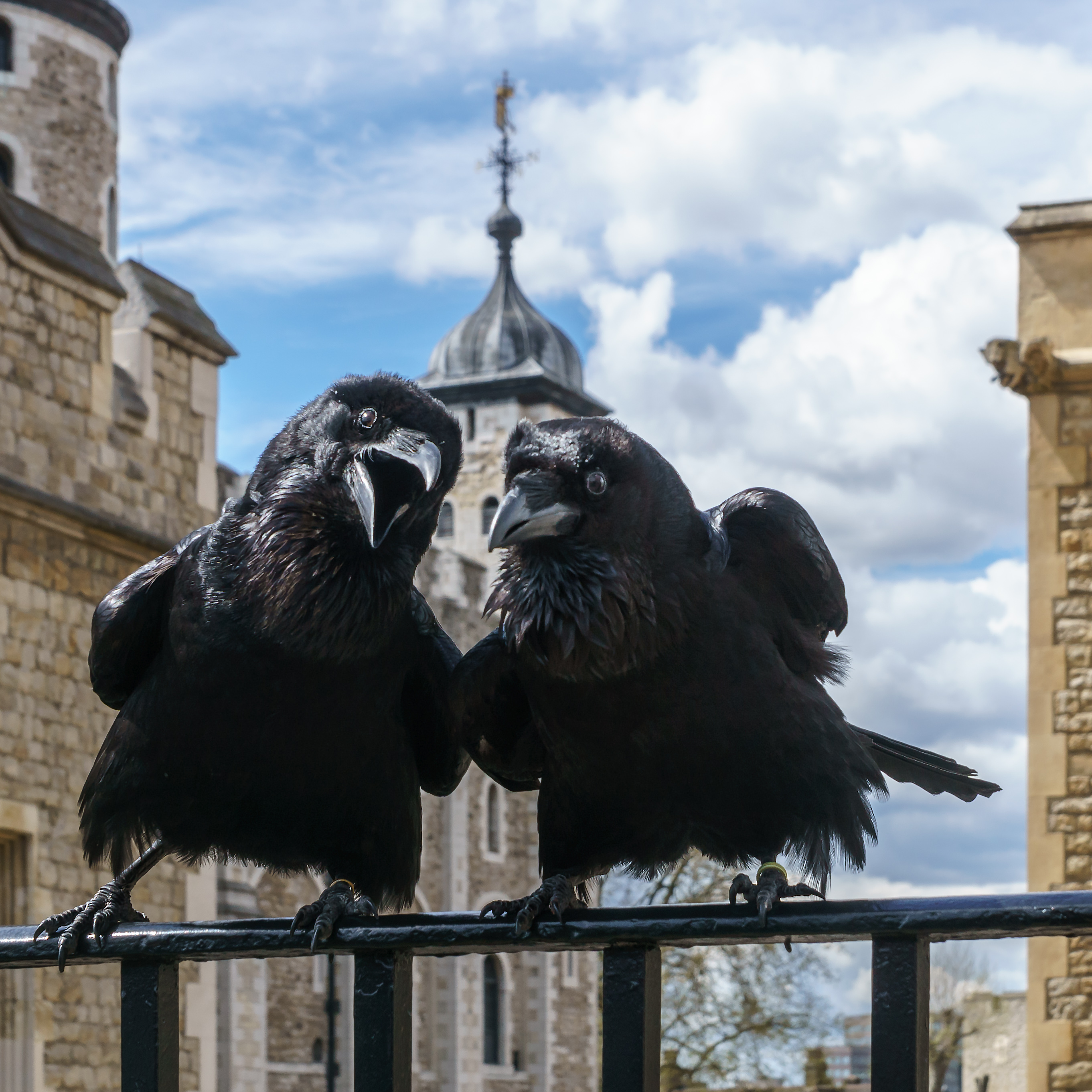
Jubilee and Munin, two of the Tower's ravens in 2016

It is believed in Britain that the Crown and Britain will collapse if the ravens of the Tower of London are lost or fly away. The astronomer of Charles II, John Flamsteed, asked the king to move the ravens from the tower. Fearing the mythology, the king ordered that the six ravens remain in place, and he instead relocated the Royal observatory to Greenwich.

The most well-known British table superstition is not to seat thirteen people at a table, and if salt is spilled, a pinch must be thrown over the left shoulder into the eyes of the Devil. Crossed knives at the table signify a conflict, while a white tablecloth left on a table overnight signifies that a coffin will soon be needed. Many women believed that stirring food "widdershins" or in the opposite direction of the Sun, would cause it to spoil. In Dorset, there is a belief that a slow-boiling kettle is bewitched, and might contain a toad. There is also a well-known saying that states "a watched pot never boils".

In Great Malvern, England, during the Victorian Era, it was considered bad luck to collect water from the springs on a half hour. If collected on a half hour, the superstition is that the water would be poison and also kill patients of the water cure.

In Berkshire, England, there is a popular superstition that a ring formed from a piece of silver collected at Communion provides a cure for all convulsions and fits. Another British superstition holds that a silver ring would cure fits if it is crafted from five sixpences collected from five separate bachelors and delivered by the hand of a bachelor to a bachelor smith.

=== Witchcraft ===
The belief in witchcraft was given more impetus due to the general agitation of religious ideas and the propensity of English Civil War fighters to rely on pictures drawn from beliefs about the devil and witches or to utilize omens to argue for the wrongdoings of their opponents.

=== Polls ===
A 2003 survey carried out by Richard Wiseman of the University of Hertfordshire during National Science Week, showed 74% of the 2068 participants believed in touching wood, which was followed by "crossing fingers, avoiding ladders, not smashing mirrors, carrying a lucky charm and having superstitious beliefs about the number 13." According to a 2007 poll conducted by Ipsos and Ben Schott of Schott's Almanac, while 77% of the British population deny being superstitious, half of them (51%) touch wood to ward off bad luck, two-fifths (39%) cross their fingers for good luck, 16% own a lucky charm, and 15% of them believe the number '13' is unlucky.
