= Uncut (magazine) =

British music magazine

- Cover of the December 2024 issue
- Editor: Michael Bonner
- Categories: Music magazine
- Frequency: Monthly
- Circulation: 47,890 (ABC Jul–Dec 2015); Print and digital editions
- First issue: May 1997
- Company: Kelsey Media
- Country: United Kingdom
- Based in: London
- Language: English
- Website: uncut.co.uk
- ISSN: 1368-0722

Uncut is a monthly magazine based in London. It is available across the English-speaking world, and focuses on music, but also includes film and books sections. A DVD magazine under the Uncut brand was published quarterly from 2005 to 2006. The magazine was acquired in 2019 by Singaporean music company BandLab Technologies, and was published by NME Networks from December 2021 to August 2023, when the brand was sold to Kelsey Media.

== Uncut (main magazine) ==
Uncut was launched in May 1997 by IPC as "a monthly magazine aimed at 25- to 45-year-old men that focuses on music and movies", edited by Allan Jones (former editor of Melody Maker). Jones has stated that "[t]he idea for Uncut came from my own disenchantment about what I was doing with Melody Maker. There was a publishing initiative to make the audience younger; I was getting older and they wanted to take the readers further away from me", specifically referring to the then dominant Britpop genre.

According to IPC Media, 86% of the magazine's readers are male and their average age is 37 years.

Uncut's contents include lengthy features on old albums, interviews with film directors, music and film news, and reviews of all major new album, film and DVD releases. Its music features tend to focus on genres such as Americana, rock and alternative country. Each month, the magazine includes a free CD, which may include both new and older music. Special Issues have covered U2, Radiohead, Bob Dylan, Bruce Springsteen, the Byrds, David Bowie, Demon Records, Eric Clapton, John Lennon, Pink Floyd, Queen, Martin Scorsese, Motown Records, Morrissey, George Harrison, Jimmy Page, Led Zeppelin, the Beach Boys, Paul McCartney, Neil Young, the Beatles, Elvis Costello, the Kinks, Fleetwood Mac and more.

Uncut underwent a radical redesign in May 2006, as a result of which the magazine no longer catered for books and reduced its film content.

Jones writes a regular monthly column, recounting stories from his long career in music journalism.

Uncut's monthly circulation dropped from over 90,000 in 2007 to 47,890 in the second half of 2015.

In 2019, TI Media, successor to IPC, sold NME and Uncut to Singaporean company BandLab Technologies. BandLab Technologies became the Caldecott Music Group in 2021 and split itself into three sub-units called BandLab Technologies, Vista Musical Instruments and NME Networks, with the latter group continuing to publish Uncut. In May 2023, NME Networks sold Uncut's print and digital assets to Kelsey Media, publisher of car magazines like Car Mechanics, Motorsport News and Fast Car, and farming titles like Crop Production Magazine, Practical Pigs and The Smallholder. The first copy of Uncut published under Kelsey Media was the September 2023 issue (Take 317) in August, with the magazine still being sold in shops with its Now Playing compilation CD.

== The Ultimate Music Guide ==
Uncut often produces themed spin-off titles celebrating the career of one artist. This series is now known as The Ultimate Music Guide, but was initially known as Uncut Legends. The series started in 2003 with an inaugural issue devoted to Bob Dylan, edited by Nigel Williamson (though the majority of titles that followed were produced by magazine editor Chris Hunt), followed by magazines entirely devoted to Radiohead, Kurt Cobain, U2, Bruce Springsteen, Tom Waits and John Lennon (with the Lennon magazine being produced to commemorate the 25th anniversary of the death of the former member of the Beatles).

Since the series was rebranded as The Ultimate Music Guide, artists such as Kraftwerk, Wilco, Creedence Clearwater Revival, the Fall and Talking Heads have been featured, with updated and expanded versions of earlier guides also released as Deluxe Editions (for example Lennon: 80th Birthday Edition or PJ Harvey's guide which came out again as a '30th Anniversary Edition' in June 2021).

In 2021, Uncut launched more spin-offs including The Complete Bob Dylan and The Beatles – Miscellany & Atlas, the latter being a publication typeset in the style of Schott's Miscellany.

Year	Pub Date	Vol	Original - Title	Cover detail
2009	April	1	U2	
2010	Spring	2	Bruce Springsteen	
2010		3	John Lennon	
2010		4	The Rolling Stones	
2010	Jan	5	The Who	
2010		6	Pink Floyd	
2010	Jan	7	David Bowie	
2012	Jan	8	The Clash	
20	March	9	REM	
20	June	10	Led Zepplin	
2012	Sept	11	Paul Weller	
2012	Winter	12	The Kinks	
2013	January	14	The Beatles	
2013	March	15	The Smiths	
2013	Sept	16	Nick Cave	
2013	Autumn	17	Depeche Mode	
2014	Sept	18	Small Faces & the Faces	
2014	Sept	19	Neil Young	
2014		20	Lou Reed	
2014	Sept	21	Oasis	
2014	Sept	22	The Cure	
2014	Sept	23	Tom Waits	
2014	Oct	24	Elvis Costello	
2015	Jan	25	Paul McCartney	
2015	Mar	26	Kate Bush	
2015	Aug	27	The Sex Pistols	
2015	May	28	Bob Dylan	
2015	Nov	29	Queen	
2016	Jan	30	The Byrds	
2016	Mar	31	The Beach Boys	
2016	May	32	Radiohead	
2016	May	33	Van Morrison	
2016	July	34	Eric Clapton	
2016	Sept	35	Jimi Hendrix	
2016	Nov	36	PJ Harvey	
2017	Jan	37	Leonard Cohen	
2017	May	38	Joni Mitchell	
2017	Sept	39	Bob Marley	
2017	Apr	40	Genesis	
2017	Sept	41	Prince	
2017	Nov	42	Steely Dan	
2018	May	43	Yes	
2018	Apr	44	Fleetwood Mac	
2018		45	Tom Petty	
2018	Jun	46	Black Sabbath & Ozzy Osbourne	
2018	Aug	47	Bob Dylan & the Band	
2018	Oct	48	Deep Purple	
2018	Dec	49	George Harrison	
2019	Feb	50	Roxy Music	
2019	April	51	Elton John	
2019	June	52	King Crimson	
2019	Aug	53	Ringo Starr	
2019	Oct	54	Crosby, Stills, Nash & Young	
2019	Nov	55	Joy Division & New Order	
2020	Jan	56	Simon & Garfunkel	
2020	Mar	57	Blondie	
2020	May	58	Kraftwerk	
2020	July	59	Wilco	
2020	Sept	60	The Grateful Dead	
2020		61	Talking Heads	
2020	Jan	62	T.Rex	
2021	March	63	The Fall	
2021		64	Creedence Clearwater Revival	
2021	July	65	The Doors	
2021	Sept	66	the Specials	
2021	Novem	67	Velvet Underground & Nico	
2022	January	68	The Pretenders	
2022	March	69	Robert Plant	
2022	May	70	The Eagles	
2022	July	71	Kate Bush 2 (Reprint)	
2022	Sept	72	Pixies & The Breeders	
2022		73	Patti Smith	
2023	January	74	Elvis Presley	
2023	March	75	The Yardbirds	
2023	May	76	The White Stripes	
2023	July	77	AC/DC	
2023	Oct	78	Television	
2024	Jan	79	Peter Gabriel	
2024		80	Nirvana	Issue
2024	18.07	81	Rod Stewart	
2025		82	The Police	
2025		83	Siouxie and the Banshees	
2025		84	Pavement	
2026	Jan	85	The Pogues	
2026	Oct	86	Bob Dylan The Bootleg Series	Issue 82

=== The History of Rock ===
In 2015, The History of Rock (using a title previously used for an Orbis Publishing partwork) was launched as a spin-off from Uncut. The new magazine would cover the key events in rock history by year, starting in 1965 and continuing to the present day (though the series was never completed). The History of Rock reproduced contemporary articles that had originally appeared in the music publications of IPC Magazines, with articles from Melody Maker and the NME (used for the period 1965 to 1990) joined by articles from Vox and Uncut in later issues.

=== Ultimate Genre Guide ===
Another spin-off to Bandlab's Ultimate Music Guide is the Ultimate Genre Guide, which takes an in depth look at a particular music style. Magazines in this series include 2021's Ultimate Genre Guide to Shoegaze which features articles about The Jesus and Mary Chain, Lush and My Bloody Valentine, as well as issues devoted to Punk, Glam and Soul In July 2023, the latest Ultimate Genre Guide was published, a title devoted to Goth which featured articles on the Cure, Nick Cave and cover star Siouxsie.

== Uncut DVD ==
In late 2005, editor Allan Jones and publishing director Andrew Sumner launched a spin-off of the main movies and music magazine, that focused its attention on DVD releases of classic movies. Billed as "the only great movie magazine", Uncut DVD was designed to compete with such established titles as Ultimate DVD, DVD Review and DVD Monthly. Despite strong reviews in the UK trade press, Uncut DVD folded after three quarterly issues.

== Uncut Music Award ==
In 2008, Uncut launched its inaugural Uncut Music Award; this is described as "a quest to find the most inspiring and rewarding musical experience of the past year". A list of 25 nominees is selected by a panel of 10 judges, who are all musicians or music industry professionals, and they come together to decide a winner. Past winners have included Fleet Foxes (2008), Tinariwen (2009), Paul Weller (2010) and P.J. Harvey (2011).
