= Kuai Kuai culture =

Modern Taiwanese custom

Kuai Kuai culture is a phenomenon in Taiwan wherein people put snacks of the brand Kuai Kuai (Chinese: 乖乖; pinyin: guāiguāi; Wade–Giles: kuai^{1}kuai^{1}) next to or on top of machines. People who do this believe that, because the name of the snack—"Kuai Kuai"—stands for "obedient" or "well-behaved," it will make a device function without errors. As such, it can be commonly found in myriad places of work in Taiwanese society. A rigid set of best practices has arisen surrounding the proper use of Kuai Kuai snacks, such as using green bags only, and ensuring the snacks are not expired.

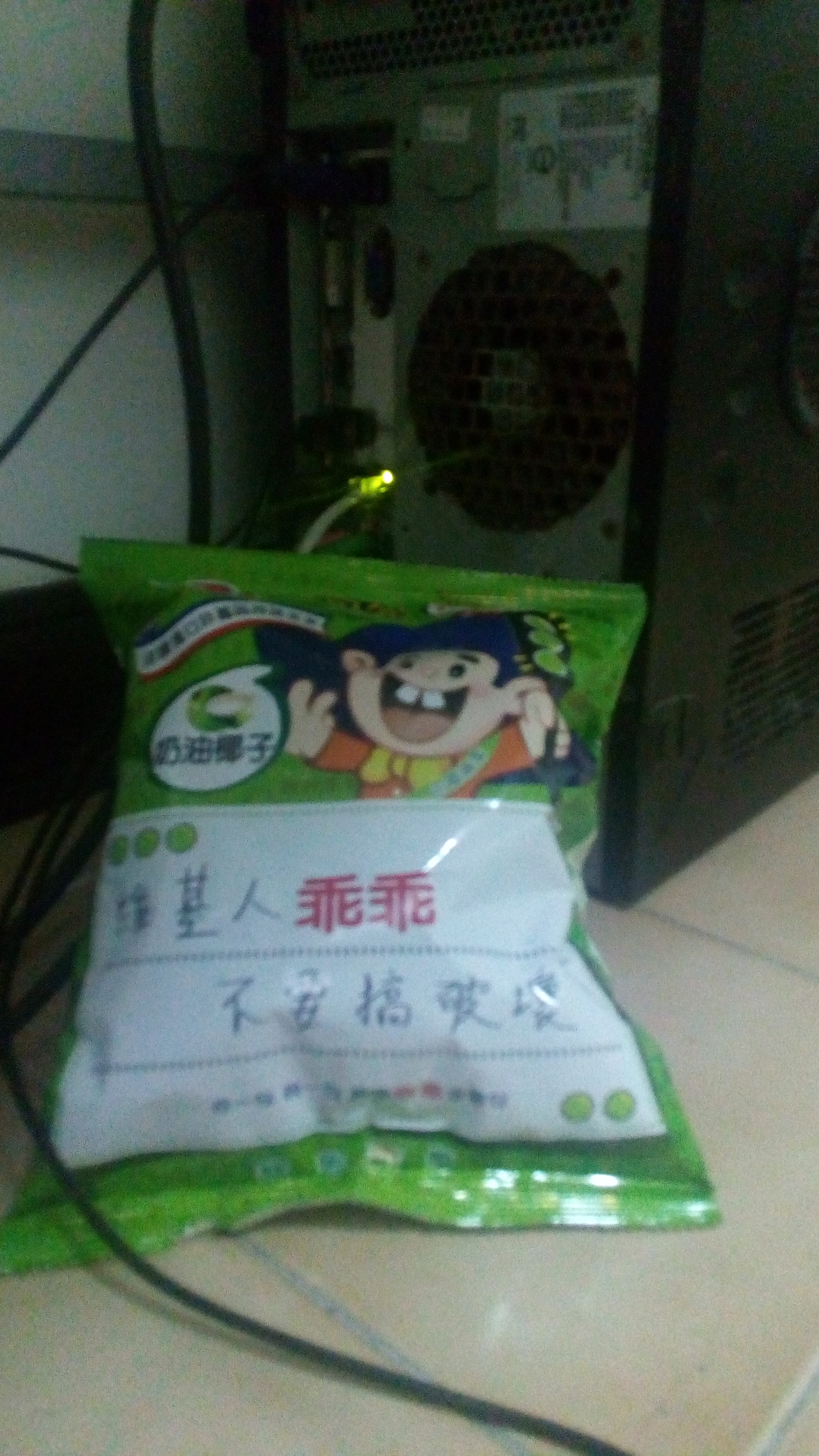
A bag of coconut butter flavored Kuai Kuai, with green bag, next to a desktop PC, believed by some Taiwanese to bless the machine. The package design has a space for writing wishes. The one pictured has been written with "Wikipedians behave. Do not sabotage." (維基人乖乖／不要搞破壞)

== Cultural influence ==
Kuai Kuai Company Limited was established in 1968. The company produces mainly cookies and puff corn snacks; among these is a line of puff corn snacks bearing the company's name.

The practice of adorning machines with the snack was documented as early as 2008. Adornment is not only an informal convention of the information industry in Taiwan, but also expands to other fields of industries. Kuai Kuai is now placed next to the devices of server rooms, ATMs, ticket booths, control systems, and toll booths. It was also seen in places such as a computer center, a social affairs bureau, an architecture of sustainability, a police station, a hospital, an office of nursing, a center of domestic violence and sexual assault prevention, a cutting room, a theater, household registration offices, and examination halls for national tests. It is also among the only items of food that one can bring into otherwise-fragile computer and server rooms.

The culture is seen by some as superstition. For example, movie director Chi Po-lin is on the record as saying, "I write my name (on the bag) and I am not fooling around." However, the vice professor of Taipei City University of Science and Technology, Chiang Tsan-teng (江燦騰), points out that the purported stabilizing effects of Kuai Kuai may be purely a coincidence, and the snack is only a placebo for engineers.

== Convention ==
The placement of Kuai Kuai is rather rigid. Because the indication light denoting correct function is green, the snack bag should be only the corresponding green one (coconut flavor). Conversely, the yellow or red ones represent abnormality and thus should not be used. For instance, in May 2017 during the collection of consolidated income taxes, the Ministry of Finance in Taiwan tried to place Kuai Kuai to save the overwhelmed operational systems due to overload access. However, they bought the yellow-colored bags, drawing criticism from netizens in Taiwan. The Kuomintang congressperson Lu Shiow-yen (盧秀燕) mentioned to the Ministry of Finance, when reviewing drafts of acts, that the Ministry must keep up with the conventions and not make mistakes with the color of the bag. However, the snack company itself proposes a different set of conventions. Green bags are for electronic devices and computer rooms. Yellow bags stand for gold and fortunes, so it is more welcome in the financial and banking industries. The red bags stands for love, so the company sells limited amounts for Valentine's Day or Mother's Day.

According to the prevailing culture, one must be aware of not only the color difference but also the expiration date. It is important to not place expired Kuai Kuai; expired products must be replaced immediately. People must also check the bags for signs of damage, lest the food inside be consumed by cockroaches or mice. Importantly, no one is permitted to open and eat snacks adorning machines themselves or haphazardly replace them. News reports in Taiwan have placed the blame for some accidents on improper Kuai Kuai usage.

== Partnerships ==
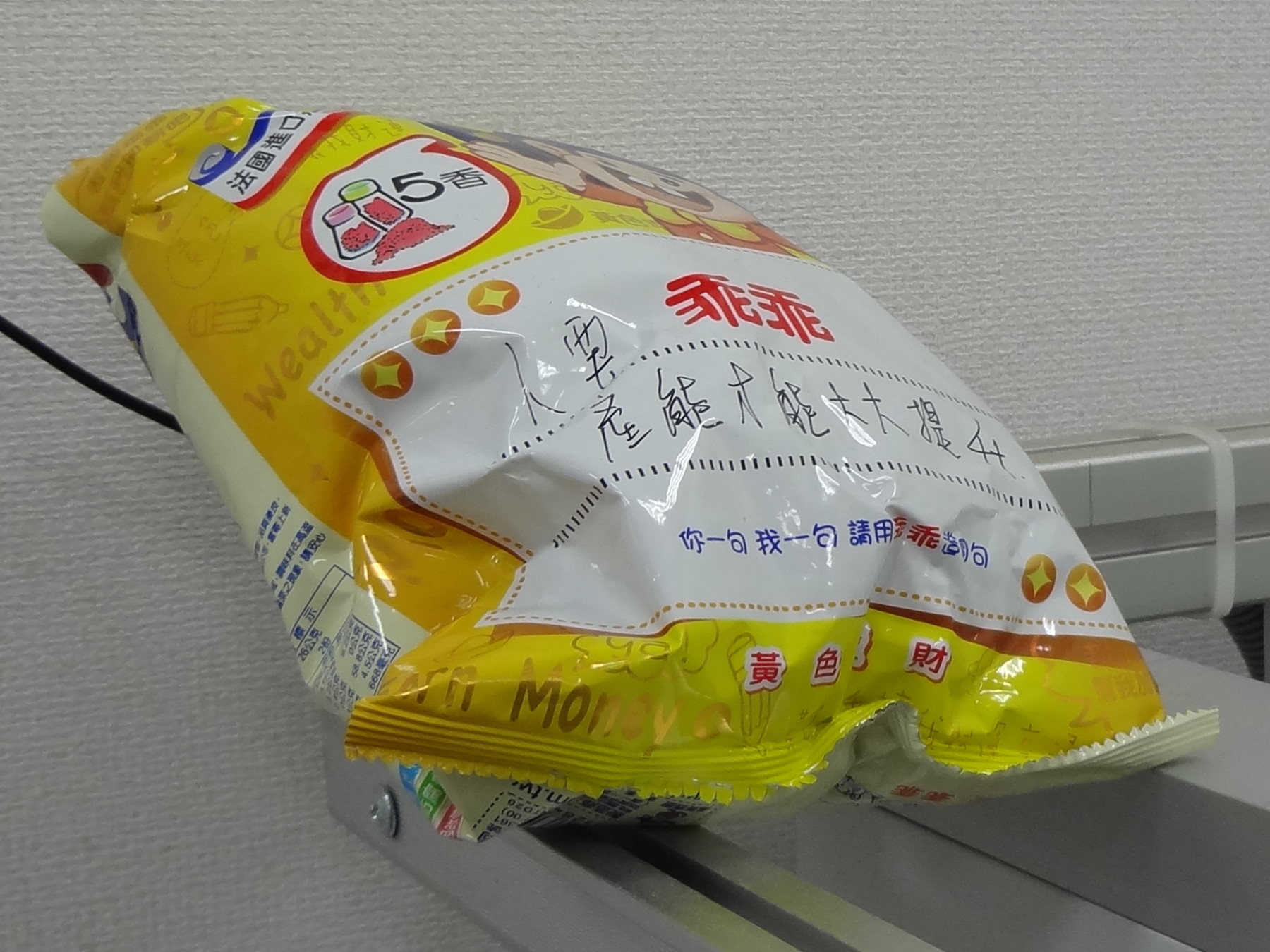
Five-spice-flavored Kuai Kuai on a conveyor belt.

The placement Kuai Kuai is often closely tied to machinery and equipment, so it is often considered part of the essential supply chain in the information industry in Taiwan. In 2016, the earthquake in Kaohsiung damaged the production line of TSMC in Southern Taiwan Science Park, and the TSMC engineers ordered a special edition of Kuai Kuai after they repaired the production line for the company staff. On the bag is customized print bearing the words "FAB14A 222K limited edition" (FAB14A 222K限定) and the mascot of the factory black-faced spoonbill; the limited edition bag could be found being sold on the internet for twenty times the ordinary price. After the event, other information companies also commissioned the Kuai Kuai company for custom editions. For example, Microsoft in Taiwan has collaborated with Kuai Kuai for the special edition of the "Peacock rice puff" (孔雀香酥脆); in March 2017, when the Taoyuan Airport MRT was opened, the MRT made 60,000 green bags that read, "Just take the MRT, it saves time" (乖乖搭捷運，省時又快捷) for the general public; Chang Hwa Bank also collaborated with Kuai Kuai to produce golden bags of five spice flavored Kuai Kuai.

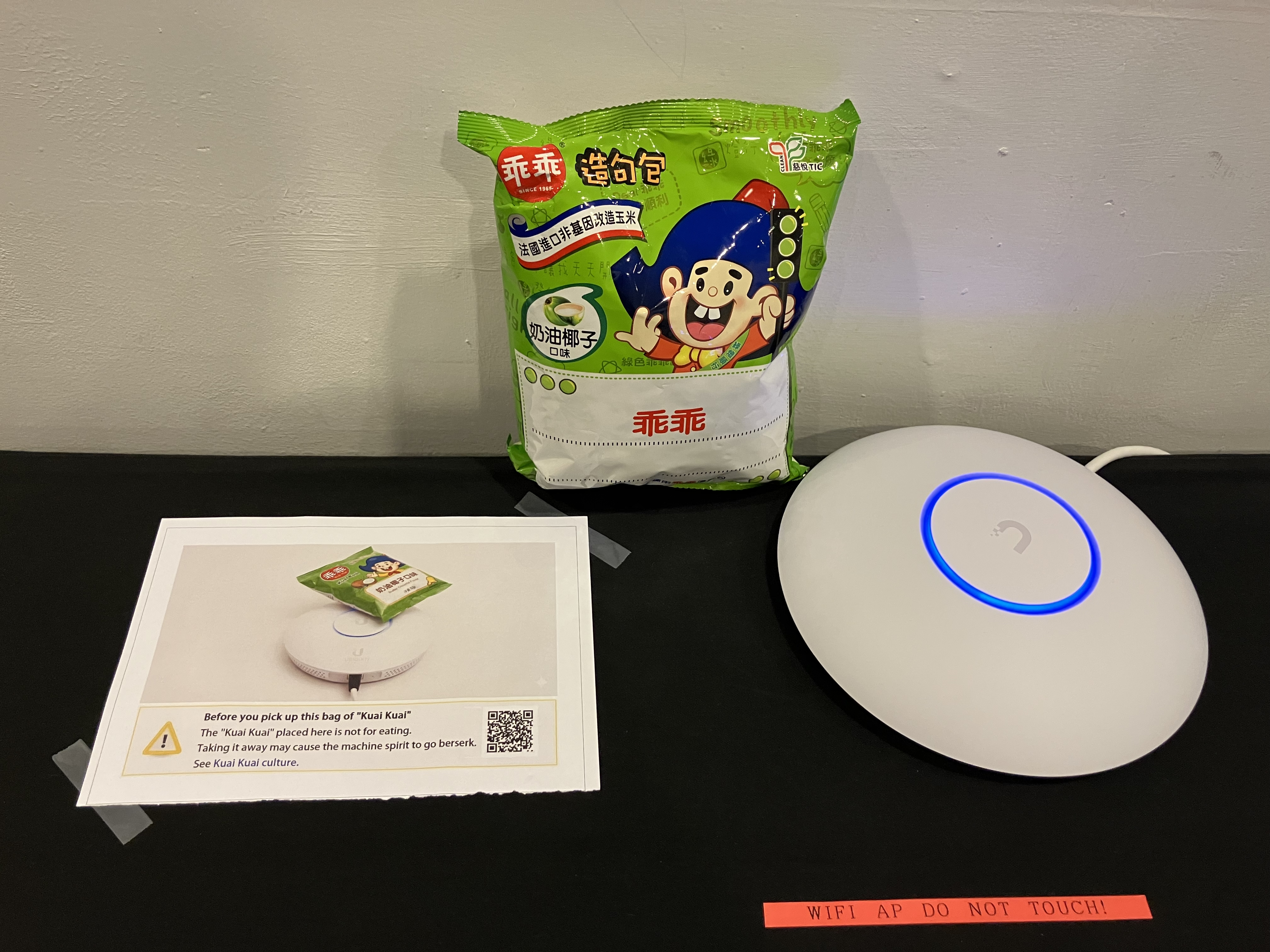
A bag of Kuai Kuai near the Wifi device at the Wikimedia Conference held in Kaohsiung, Taiwan in 2026.

In June 2017, when the German theme park Europa-Park announced the opening of a flying theater called "Voletarium," Kuai Kuai snacks were placed in the center of the press conference stage. The park introduced the snack to the public, calling it "an extraordinary tradition from Taiwan". Brogent Technologies, the company in charge of Voletarium, requires that gaming equipment outside of Taiwan from its company are all adorned with Kuai Kuai; the precise manner in which this is to be done is written in the relevant contracts.

Before the launch of Formosat-5, the first indigenous Taiwanese optical remote surveillance satellite, staff in the National Applied Research Laboratories piled up Kuai Kuai around the satellite model, to pray that all went well in the launching process. For the occasion, the Kuai Kuai company printed out another special edition bag with the laboratories reading, "All the amazing views from space will be taken into our lens" (太空浩瀚無垠，乖乖盡收眼底).
