= The Field Bazaar =

- Short story by Arthur Conan Doyle
- Country: UK
- Language: English

Publication
- Published in: The Student
- Publication type: Magazine
- Publisher: The Students' Representative Council, Edinburgh University
- Publication date: November 20, 1896

Chronology
- Series: Sherlock Holmes
The Final Problem	The Hound of the Baskervilles

"The Field Bazaar" is a short story by Arthur Conan Doyle, first published on November 20, 1896 in a special "Bazaar Number" of The Student, a publication of the students' representative council at Edinburgh University. It is a Sherlock Holmes story, published under Conan Doyle's byline and featuring both Holmes and his partner, Dr. John Watson. It is, however, treated by most experts as a parody or pastiche not suitable for inclusion in the traditional 60-story canon of Sherlock Holmes, though there are dissenters.

== Background ==
In 1896, the Students' Representative Council at Edinburgh University, Conan Doyle's alma mater, was raising money to build a pavilion at the University's new cricket field in the Craiglockhart neighborhood, southwest of downtown Edinburgh. The main fundraising event was a bazaar, held November 19–21, 1896, in the Edinburgh Music Hall. One of the items for sale at the event was a special Bazaar Number of the Council's weekly magazine, The Student, containing works by several popular authors, including Conan Doyle, J. M. Barrie, Walter Besant, William Muir, and Louis Tracy. Conan Doyle's contribution, "The Field Bazaar", was a very short story—it was two pages long—about Watson's connections to Edinburgh University and his cricket-playing college days. The story was touted in the regular issue of The Student preceding the bazaar:

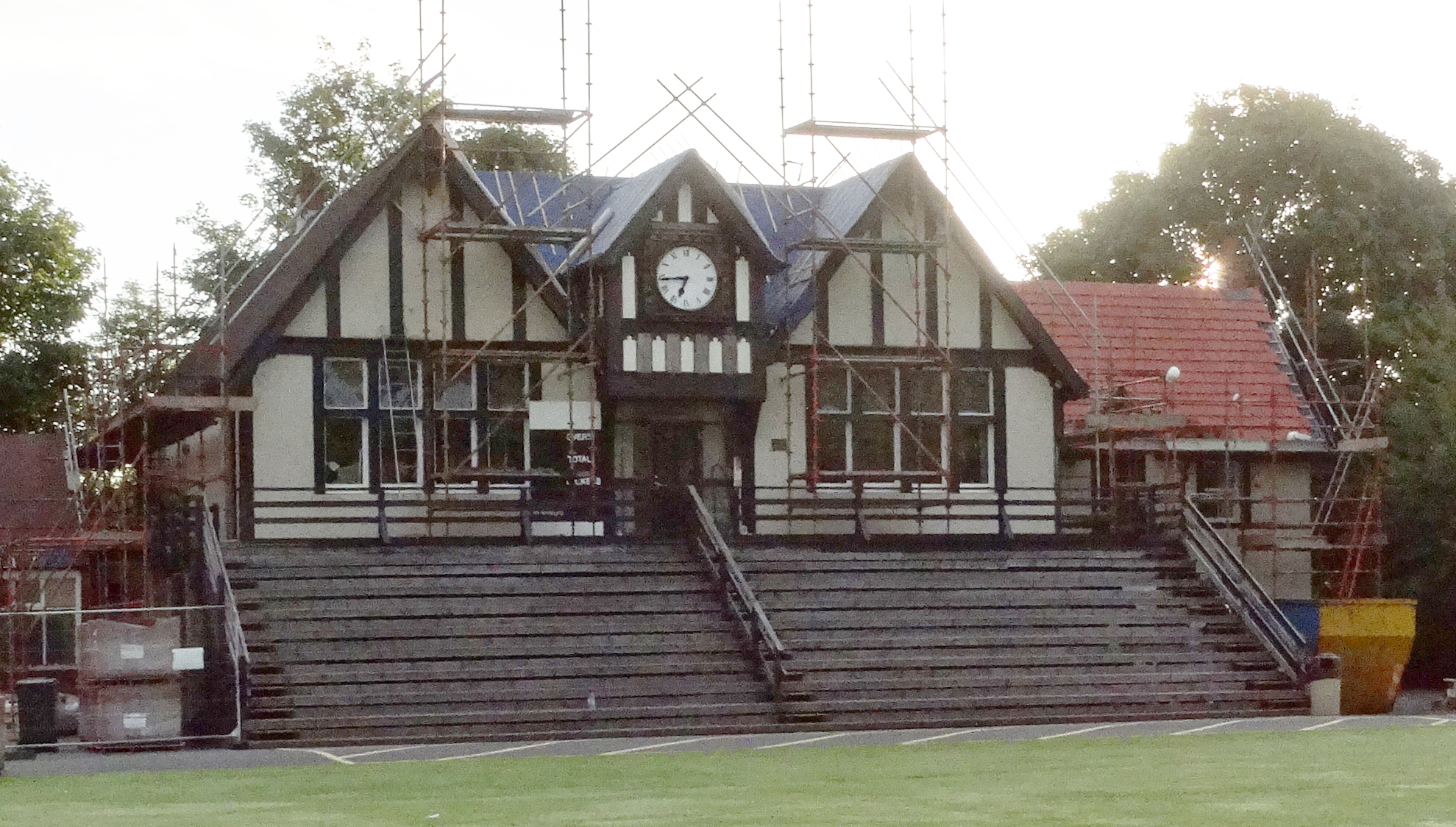
Built in 1897 partly with funds raised by sales of the issue of The Student in which "The Field Bazaar" appeared, the Craiglockhart Pavilion in Edinburgh, Scotland, was still standing (and being refurbished) in 2016.

Dr. A. Conan Doyle, another of our graduates, has contributed an original story of the "Sherlock Holmes" type. We all remember the indignation aroused by the death of the redoubtable detective, a few years ago. This is the only "Sherlock Holmes" story published since then, and we have to offer our best thanks to the writer for his kindness in thus helping us and the Bazaar.

In its first post-bazaar issue, The Student reported enthusiastic reader appreciation, including:

We received a good deal of gratuitous advice from people who were kind enough to buy the Bazaar number; but one man in particular really took the biscuit. After endeavouring to obtain his copy for sixpence, he told us that we ought to have a story by Conan Doyle every week! The Strand and The Idler only publish stories by "Sherlock Holmes" at varying intervals, and when even magazines like these can obtain a limited amount of MSS. from the talented author—well, where do we come in?

Nevertheless, "The Field Bazaar" disappeared from public view after the bazaar and was not republished in Conan Doyle's lifetime.

Conan Doyle knew the central subject of "The Field Bazaar"—cricket—quite well, being an able player himself. When he was a student at Edinburgh University, he was in the school's second XI in 1879. And he continued to play competitively well into middle age. According to his player profile at ESPNcricinfo, "Although never a famous cricketer, he could hit hard and bowl slows with a puzzling flight. For MCC v Cambridgeshire at Lord's, in 1899, he took seven wickets for 61 runs, and on the same ground two years later carried out his bat for 32 against Leicestershire, who had Woodcock, Geeson and King to bowl for them."

== Synopsis ==
Watson narrates "The Field Bazaar"—which mirrors the reality of Conan Doyle's gift of the story to The Student—from a first-person perspective.

The story opens with Holmes and Watson at breakfast in the sitting-room of their residence at 221B Baker Street. Holmes infers from a handful of clues that an envelope Watson is holding contains an invitation to "help in the Edinburgh University Bazaar." He then concludes, to Watson's astonishment, "that the particular help which you have been asked to give was that you should write in their album, and that you have already made up your mind that the present incident will be the subject of your article." Holmes then returns to reading his morning newspaper.

== Related works ==
Despite Conan Doyle's enthusiasm for cricket, "The Field Bazaar" remained his only story about the game for more than 20 years. Then in 1918 he wrote Three of Them, a series of five short stories that he described as "an attempt to catch some of the fleeting phases of childhood, those phases which are so infinitely subtle and have so rare a charm." The second story in the series, titled "About Cricket", featured a father telling his children bedtime stories about cricket. Conan Doyle also composed a poem about cricket, "A Reminiscence of Cricket", that was published in 1922. And in 1928, he produced his largest cricketing work, "The Story of Spedegue's Dropper", in which the protagonists are Walter Scougall and Tom Spedegue, not Holmes and Watson.

== Rediscovery ==
"The Field Bazaar" was rediscovered and reprinted by A. G. Macdonell in 1934.

"The Field Bazaar" resurfaced in 1934 when the owner of a copy of the Bazaar Number of The Student, prompted by publicity surrounding the founding in London of the Sherlock Holmes Society (forerunner of the modern Sherlock Holmes Society of London), sent it to the head of the Society, A. G. Macdonell. Macdonell printed 100 copies of the story. He distributed them to other members of the Society and when he visited the United States to their American counterparts The Baker Street Irregulars. The Irregulars published their own edition in 1947. Since then, "The Field Bazaar" has been republished several times, including appearances in collections edited by leading scholars of Conan Doyle and of Holmes. All modern editions silently correct a typographical oddity in the original 1896 version—missing quotation marks at the end of the story.

== Print editions ==
- The Memoirs of Sherlock Holmes: "The Field Bazaar", The Student (Students' Representative Council, Edinburgh University, November 20, 1896), pages 35–36.
- "The Field Bazaar" (Athenæum Press, 1934), single sheet.
- The Field Bazaar, in 221B: Studies in Sherlock Holmes by Various Hands (The MacMillan Company, 1940) (Vincent Starrett, editor), pages 1–4.
- The Field Bazaar (Pamphlet House, 1947), pamphlet.
- Two 'New' Holmes Stories, in The Daily Californian (January 14, 1969), pages 1 and 11.
- The Field Bazaar, in The Victorian Cricket Match (Sherlock Holmes Society of London, 2001), pages 1–3.
- The Field Bazaar, in The Green Bag Almanac & Reader (Green Bag Press, 2016), pages 370–371, 519–520.
- "The Field Bazaar" Illustrated, in The Green Bag Almanac & Reader (Green Bag Press, 2016) (David Hutchinson, illustrator), pages 464–470.

== Radio adaptations ==
The Stories of Sherlock Holmes, which ran on Springbok Radio in South Africa from 1979 to 1985, used the plot as a beginning to one of their own episodes, also titled "The Field Bazaar", in which Holmes and Watson travel to Watson's alma mater to solve a murder on a cricket pitch.

The story was incorporated into the beginning and ending of a radio adaptation of "The Adventure of the Veiled Lodger" that aired in 2006 as part of the Imagination Theatre radio series The Classic Adventures of Sherlock Holmes.
