= Superstition =

Belief or behavior that is considered irrational or supernatural

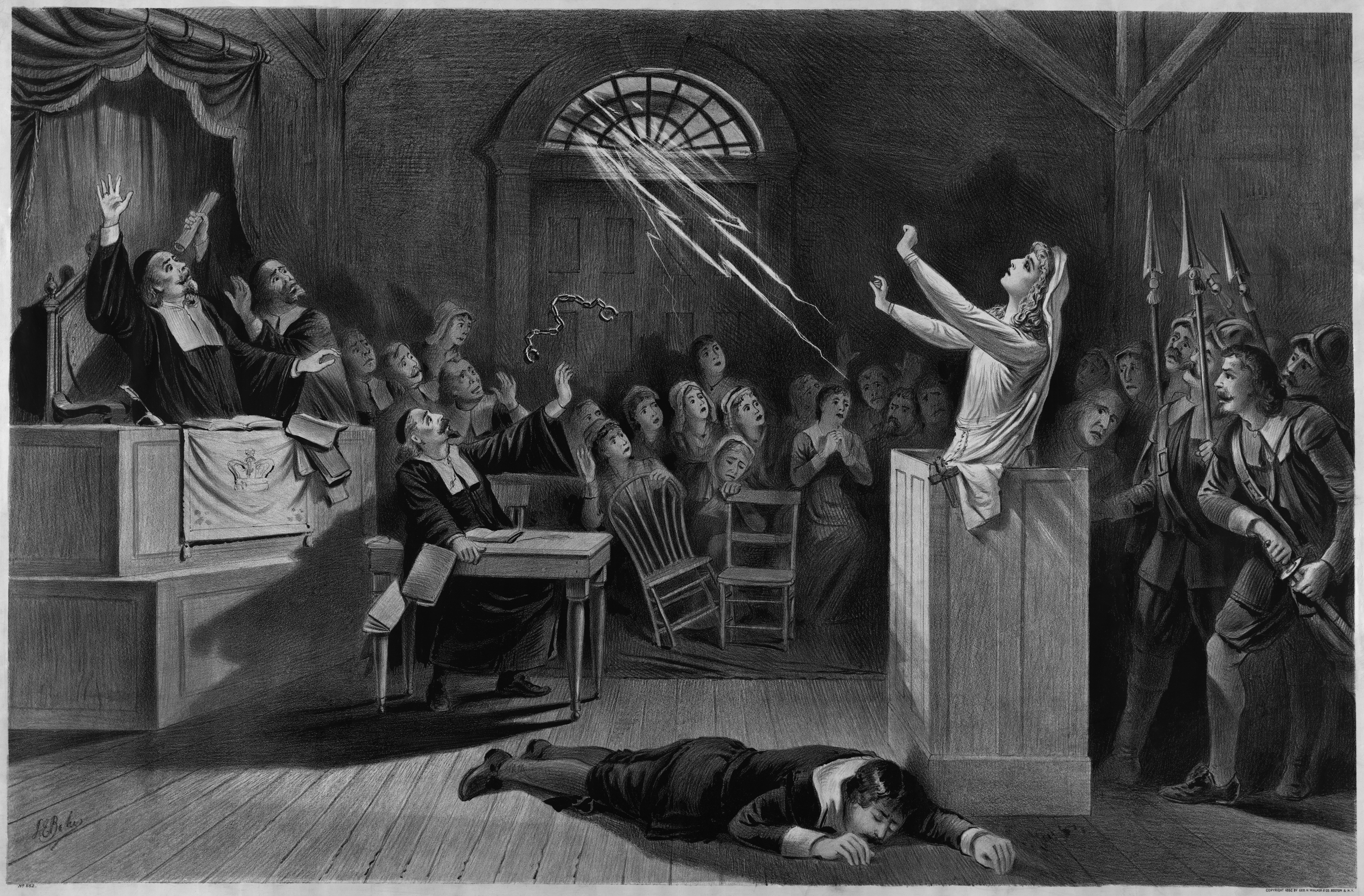
Witch-hunting is commonly motivated by religious superstition; pictured is an imaginative depiction of the Salem Witch Trials

A superstition is any belief or practice considered by non-practitioners to be irrational or supernatural. It is commonly applied to beliefs and practices surrounding luck, fate, magic, amulets, astrology, fortune telling, spirits, and certain paranormal entities, particularly the belief that future events can be foretold by specific unrelated prior events.

The word superstition is also used to refer to a religion not practiced by the majority of a given society regardless of whether the prevailing religion contains alleged superstitions or to all religions by the antireligious.

== Contemporary use ==
Definitions of the term vary, but superstitions are commonly described as irrational beliefs at odds with scientific knowledge of the world. Stuart Vyse proposes that a superstition's "presumed mechanism of action is inconsistent with our understanding of the physical world", with Jane Risen adding that these beliefs are not merely scientifically wrong but impossible. Similarly, Lysann Damisch defines superstition as "irrational beliefs that an object, action, or circumstance that is not logically related to a course of events influences its outcome." Dale Martin says that superstitions "presuppose an erroneous understanding about cause and effect, that have been rejected by modern science." The Oxford English Dictionary describes them as "irrational, unfounded", Merriam-Webster as "a false conception about causation or belief or practice", and the Cambridge Dictionary as "sans grounding in human reason or scientific knowledge". This notion of superstitious practices is not causally related to the outcomes.

Both Vyse and Martin argue that what is considered superstitious varies across cultures and time. For Vyse, "if a culture has not yet adopted science as its standard, then what we consider magic or superstition is more accurately the local science or religion." Dale points out that superstitions are often considered out of place in modern times and are influenced by modern science and its notions of what is rational or irrational, surviving as remnants of older popular beliefs and practices.

Vyse proposes that in addition to being irrational and culturally dependent, superstitions have to be instrumental; an actual effect is expected by the person holding a belief, such as increased odds of winning a prize. This distinction excludes practices where participants merely expect to be entertained.

== Alternative religious beliefs as superstition ==
Religious practices that differ from commonly accepted religions in a given culture are sometimes called superstitious; similarly, new practices brought into an established religious community can also be labeled as superstitious in an attempt to exclude them. Also, an excessive display of devoutness has often been labelled as superstitious behavior.

In antiquity, the Latin term superstitio, like its equivalent Greek deisidaimonia, became associated with exaggerated ritual and a credulous attitude towards prophecies. Greek and Roman polytheists, who modeled their relations with the gods on political and social terms, scorned the man who constantly trembled with fear at the thought of the gods, as a slave feared a cruel and capricious master. Such fear of the gods was what the Romans meant by "superstition" (Veyne 1987, p. 211). Cicero (106–43 BCE) contrasted superstitio with the mainstream religion of his day, stating: Nec vero superstitione tollenda religio tollitur – "One does not destroy religion by destroying superstition". Diderot's 18th-century Encyclopédie defines superstition as "any excess of religion in general", and links it specifically with paganism.

In his 1520 Prelude on the Babylonian Captivity of the Church, Martin Luther, who called the papacy "that fountain and source of all superstitions", accuses the popes of superstition:

For there was scarce another of the celebrated bishoprics that had so few learned pontiffs; only in violence, intrigue, and superstition has it hitherto surpassed the rest. For the men who occupied the Roman See a thousand years ago differ so vastly from those who have since come into power, that one is compelled to refuse the name of Roman pontiff either to the former or to the latter.

The current Catechism of the Catholic Church considers superstition sinful in the sense that it denotes "a perverse excess of religion", as a demonstrated lack of trust in divine providence (¶ 2110), and a violation of the first of the Ten Commandments. The Catechism represents a defense against the accusation that Catholic doctrine is superstitious:

Superstition is a deviation of religious feeling and of the practices this feeling imposes. It can even affect the worship we offer the true God, e.g., when one attributes an importance in some way magical to certain practices otherwise lawful or necessary. To attribute the efficacy of prayers or of sacramental signs to their mere external performance, apart from the interior dispositions that they demand is to fall into superstition. Cf. Matthew 23:16–22 (¶ 2111)

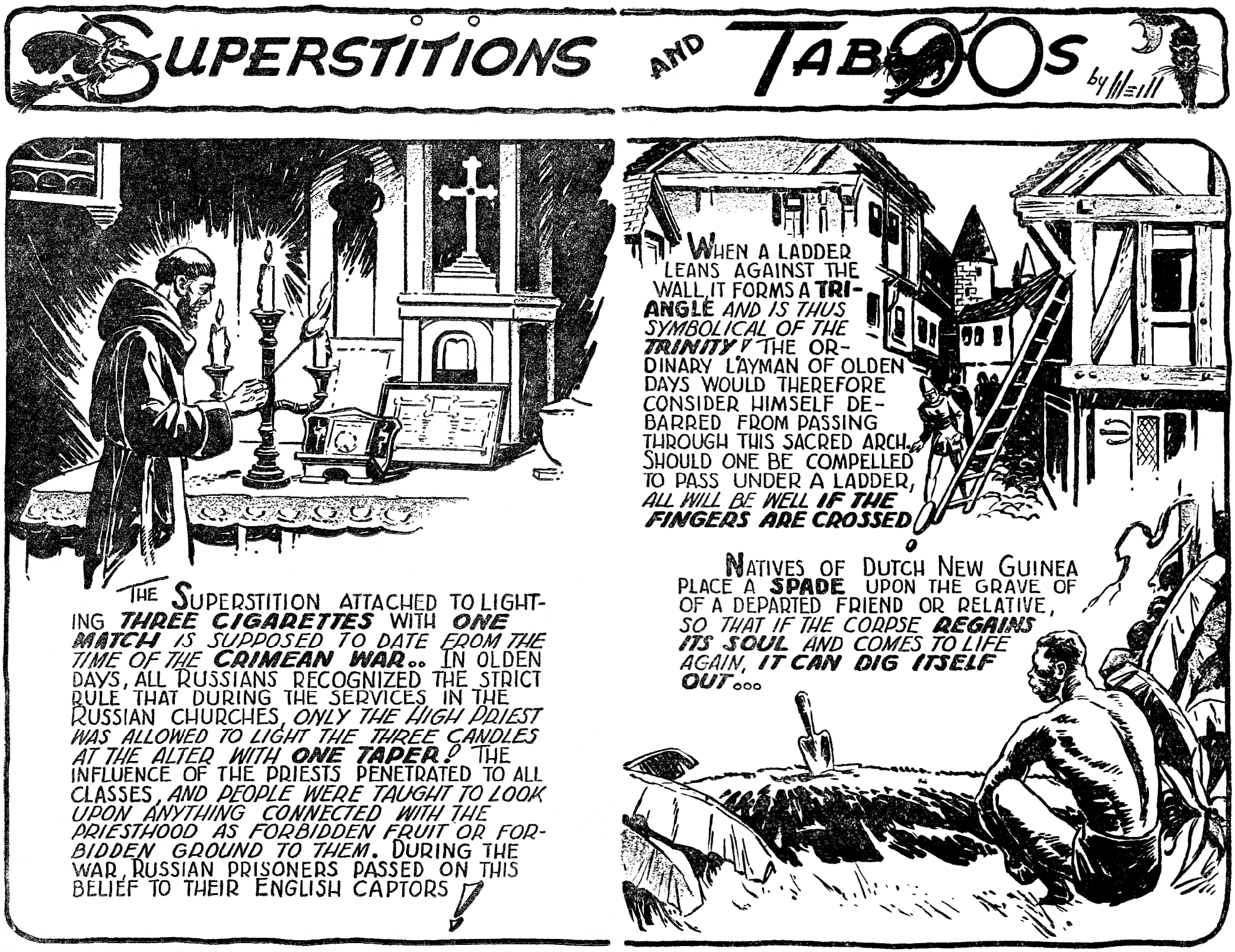
Examples of superstitions and taboos from a November 1941 issue of Weird Tales

=== Classifications ===
Dieter Harmening's 1979 book Superstitio categorizes superstitions in three categories: magic, divination and observances. The observances category subdivides into "signs" and "time". The time sub-category constitutes temporal prognostics like observances of various days related like dog days, Egyptian days, year prognosis and lunaries, whereas the signs category constitutes signs such as particular animal behaviors (like the call of birds or the neighing of horses) or the sighting of comets, or dreams. According to László Sándor Chardonnens, the signs subcategory usually needs an observer who might help in interpreting the signs and such observer does not need necessarily to be an active participant in the observation. According to Chardonnens, a participant in the category of divination may need to go beyond mere observation and need to be active participant in a given action. Examples of divination superstitions include judicial astrology, necromancy, haruspex, lot-casting, geomancy, aeromancy and prophecy. Chardonnens says superstitions belonging to the magic category are exceedingly hermetical and ritualistic: examples include witchcraft, potions, incantations, amulets etc. Chardonnens says that the observation category needs an observer, divination category needs a participant to tell what is to be observed, whereas magic requires a participant who must follow a protocol to influence the future, and that these three types of superstition need increasing stages of participation and knowledge.

Chardonnens defines "prognostication" as that component of superstition which expects knowledge of the future on systematic application of given ritual and order, and moves to classify it, writing: "Prognostication seems to occupy a place somewhere between observation and divination, of which the observation of times is represented most frequently due to the primacy of temporal prognostics.

Chardonnens classifies prophecy under the topic of divination; examples including the prophets of the Old Testament, biblical typological allegory, the fifteen signs before Judgement Day, and the many prophecies expressed by saints; Chardonnens further points out that since many aspects of religious experience are tied up with prophecy, the medieval church condones the same. Chardonnens says, one could differentiate between those kinds of prophecy which are (1) inspired by God or Satan and their minions; (2) "gecyndelic"; and (3) "wiglung" examples —lacking divine or infernal inspiration and not "gecyndelic" either. But practically, however, most, if not all, words relating to prophecy ought to be interpreted as inspired.

=== Criticism of definitions ===
Identifying something as superstition generally expresses a pejorative view. Items referred to as such in common parlance are commonly referred to as folk belief in folkloristics.

According to László Sándor Chardonnens, Oxford English Dictionary (OED) definitions pass value-judgement and attribution to "fear and ignorance" without doing enough justice to elaborate systems of superstitions. Chardonnens says the religious element in OED denotations is not understood as a system of observance and testifies to a belief in higher power on part of the compiler of the dictionary.

==== Subjective perceptions ====
Richard Webster's The Encyclopedia of Superstitions points out that many superstitions have connections with religion, that people may hold individual subjective perceptions vis à vis superstitions against one another (people of one belief are likely to call people of another belief superstitious); Constantine regarded paganism as a superstition; Tacitus on other hand regarded Christianity as a pernicious superstition; Saul of Tarsus and Martin Luther perceived any thing that was not centered on Christ to be superstitious. According to Dale Martin, difference of opinion on what constitutes "superstition" may become apparent when one moves from one culture to another culture.

Academic S.A. Smith writes that "superstition" has long been used as a pejorative characterization by people or groups seeking to malign their opponents.

=== Etymology ===
While the formation of the Latin word is clear, from the verb super-stare, "to stand over, stand upon; survive", its original intended sense is less clear. It can be interpreted as "'standing over a thing in amazement or awe", but other possibilities have been suggested, e.g. the sense of excess, i.e. over-scrupulousness or over-ceremoniousness in the performing of religious rites, or else the survival of old, irrational religious habits.

The earliest known use as a noun is found in Plautus, Ennius and later in Pliny the Elder, with the meaning of art of divination. From its use in the Classical Latin of Livy and Ovid, it is used in the pejorative sense that it holds today: of an excessive fear of the gods or unreasonable religious belief; as opposed to religio, the proper, reasonable awe of the gods. Cicero derived the term from superstitiosi, lit. those who are "left over", i.e. "survivors", "descendants", connecting it with excessive anxiety of parents in hoping that their children would survive them to perform their necessary funerary rites.

According to Michael David Bailey, it was with Pliny's usage that magic came close to superstition; and charges of being superstitious were first leveled by Roman authorities on their Christian subjects. In turn, early Christian writers saw all Roman and Pagan cults as superstitious, worshipping false Gods, fallen angels and demons. With Christian usage almost all forms of magic started being described as forms of superstition.

Academic Dale B. Martin wrote that the term superstitio proliferated in the Roman empire as a term for religious heretics who spread "contagious" and "depraved" beliefs.

== Superstition and psychology ==
=== Origins ===
==== Behaviorism perspective ====
In 1948, behavioral psychologist B.F. Skinner published an article in the Journal of Experimental Psychology, in which he described his pigeons exhibiting what appeared to be superstitious behaviour. One pigeon was making turns in its cage, another would swing its head in a pendulum motion, while others also displayed a variety of other behaviours. Because these behaviors were all done ritualistically in an attempt to receive food from a dispenser, even though the dispenser had already been programmed to release food at set time intervals regardless of the pigeons' actions, Skinner believed that the pigeons were trying to influence their feeding schedule by performing these actions. He then extended this as a proposition regarding the nature of superstitious behavior in humans.

Skinner's theory regarding superstition being the nature of the pigeons' behaviour has been challenged by other psychologists such as Staddon and Simmelhag, who theorised an alternative explanation for the pigeons' behaviour.

Despite challenges to Skinner's interpretation of the root of his pigeons' superstitious behaviour, his conception of the reinforcement schedule has been used to explain superstitious behaviour in humans. Originally, in Skinner's animal research, "some pigeons responded up to 10,000 times without reinforcement when they had originally been conditioned on an intermittent reinforcement basis." Compared to the other reinforcement schedules (e.g., fixed ratio, fixed interval), these behaviours were also the most resistant to extinction. This is called the partial reinforcement effect, and this has been used to explain superstitious behaviour in humans. To be more precise, this effect means that, whenever an individual performs an action expecting a reinforcement, and none seems forthcoming, it actually creates a sense of persistence within the individual.

==== Evolutionary/cognitive perspective ====
From a simpler perspective, natural selection will tend to reinforce a tendency to generate weak associations or heuristics that are overgeneralized. If there is a strong survival advantage to making correct associations, then this will outweigh the negatives of making many incorrect, "superstitious" associations. It has also been argued that there may be connections between OCD and superstition. It is stated that superstitions are long-held beliefs that are rooted in coincidence and/or cultural tradition rather than logic and facts.

OCD that involves superstition is often referred to as "Magical Thinking" People with this kind of manifestation of OCD believe that if they do not follow through with a certain compulsion, then something bad will happen to either themselves or others. Superstitious OCD, while can appear in anyone with OCD, more often appears in people with a religious background or with people who grew up in a culture that believes in magic and perform rituals. Like stated before in the article above, superstition and prophecies are sometimes linked together. People with religious or superstitious OCD may have compulsions and perform ritualistic behaviors. Those with "magical thinking" OCD may realize that doing an action will not actually 'save' someone, but the fear that if they do not perform a certain behavior someone could get hurt is so overwhelming that they do it just to be sure. People with superstitious OCD will go out of their way to avoid something deemed 'unlucky'. Such as the 13th floor of a building, the 13th room, certain numbers or colors, because if they do not they believe something horrible may happen. Though superstitious OCD may work in reverse where one will always wear a certain item of clothing or jewelry or carry a certain item like a bag because it brings them 'luck' and allow good things to happen.

A recent theory by Jane Risen proposes that superstitions are intuitions that people acknowledge to be wrong, but acquiesce to rather than correct when they arise as the intuitive assessment of a situation. Her theory draws on dual-process models of reasoning. In this view, superstitions are the output of "System 1" reasoning that are not corrected even when caught by "System 2".

=== Mechanisms ===
People seem to believe that superstitions influence events by changing the likelihood of currently possible outcomes rather than by creating new possible outcomes. In sporting events, for example, a lucky ritual or object is thought to increase the chance that an athlete will perform at the peak of their ability, rather than increasing their overall ability at that sport.

Psychologist Stuart Vyse has pointed out that until about 2010, "[m]ost researchers assumed superstitions were irrational and focused their attentions on discovering why people were superstitious." Vyse went on to describe studies that looked at the relationship between performance and superstitious rituals. Preliminary work has indicated that such rituals can reduce stress and thereby improve performance, but, Vyse has said, "...not because they are superstitious but because they are rituals.... So there is no real magic, but there is a bit of calming magic in performing a ritualistic sequence before attempting a high-pressure activity.... Any old ritual will do."

=== Occurrence ===
People tend to attribute events to supernatural causes (in psychological terms, "external causes") most often under two circumstances.

1. People are more likely to attribute an event to a superstitious cause if it is unlikely than if it is likely. In other words, the more surprising the event, the more likely it is to evoke a supernatural explanation. This is believed to stem from an effectance motivation – a basic desire to exert control over one's environment. When no natural cause can explain a situation, attributing an event to a superstitious cause may give people some sense of control and ability to predict what will happen in their environment.
2. People are more likely to attribute an event to a superstitious cause if it is negative than positive. This is called negative agency bias. Boston Red Sox fans, for instance, attributed the failure of their team to win the world series for 86 years to the curse of the Bambino: a curse placed on the team for trading Babe Ruth to the New York Yankees so that the team owner could fund a Broadway musical. When the Red Sox finally won the world series in 2004, however, the team's success was attributed to the team's skill and the rebuilding effort of the new owner and general manager. More commonly, people are more likely to perceive their computer to act according to its own intentions when it malfunctions than functions properly.

=== Consumer behavior ===
According to consumer behavior analytics of John C. Mowen et al., superstitions are employed as a heuristic tool hence those influence a variety of consumer behaviors. John C. Mowen et al. says, after taking into account for a set of antecedents, trait superstitions are predictive of a wide variety of consumer beliefs, like beliefs in astrology or in common negative superstitions (e.g., fear of black cats). A general proneness to be superstitious leads to enduring temperament to gamble, participation in promotional games, investments in stocks, forwarding of superstitious e‐mails, keeping good‐luck charms, and exhibit sport fanship etc. Additionally it has been estimated that between $700 million and $800 million are lost every Friday the 13th because of people's refusal to travel, purchase major items or conduct business.

== Superstition and politics ==
Ancient Greek historian Polybius in his Histories uses the word superstition explaining that in ancient Rome that belief maintained the cohesion of the empire, operating as an instrumentum regni.

=== Europe ===
As European empires expanded, they encountered foreign religious cultures and practices. Academic Albert Wu writes that for these empires, "'Superstition' became an important way to differentiate indigenous practices and beliefs from the organized 'religion' that could be found in Europe."

In late 1870s Germany, Prussian liberals criticized pilgrimages to Marian sites, contending that these pilgrimages were superstition and an activity of the "credulous, bigoted masses"

In the 1870s and 1880s, French Republicans went into rural France and sought to eliminate what they viewed as quackery and superstition.

Academic Albert Wu writes that in the late 19th century, anti-superstition developed "not only as a tool that aided the European domination of non-European countries, but also as a platform for nascent nation-states to forge a new collective identity among a fragmented populace. In other words, anti-superstition became an important part of the toolkit of state-building and state-making in the late nineteenth century."

=== China ===
Modernizers in China including Hu Shih, Chen Duxiu, and Cai Yuanpei viewed superstition as an obstacle to China becoming a strong and modern nation state.

From 1927 to 1937, the Nationalist government of the Republic of China condemned folk religious practices as superstition and sought to eliminate these practices through anti-superstition campaigns. It banned the professional practices of the "three aunties and six grannies": Buddhist and Daoist nuns, female fortune-tellers, female healers, female shamans, procuresses, female matchmakers, brothel madams, and midwives. In its campaign against superstition, the Nationalist government condemned men who practiced arts deemed superstitious as disreputable, deeming them "unproductive" and "useless to society." Male ritual professions condemned in this way included shamans, fortune tellers, and geomancers, among others.The efficacy of the ROC's anti-superstition policies were limited as a result of its weak bureaucracy, the political divisions of the warlord era, and then the Second Sino-Japanese War.

The Chinese Communist Party's first mass campaign against superstition occurred in Yan'an in 1944 and 1945. The campaign sought to eliminate shamanic ritual practices, reform shamans into productive workers, and to promote public health and hygiene. Various campaigns from the 1950s to the 1970s sought to eliminate the influence of folk religion, including through exhibition of objects deemed superstitious and publishing confessions from spirit mediums. These campaigns aimed to expose what the CCP deemed to be evil and ignorant superstitious practices.

== Opposition to superstition ==
In the classical era, the existence of gods was actively debated both among philosophers and theologians, and opposition to superstition arose consequently. The poem De rerum natura, written by the Roman poet and philosopher Lucretius further developed the opposition to superstition. Cicero's work De natura deorum also had a great influence on the development of the modern concept of superstition as well as the word itself. Where Cicero distinguished superstitio and religio, Lucretius used only the word religio. Cicero, for whom superstitio meant "excessive fear of the gods" wrote that "superstitio, non religio, tollenda est ", which means that only superstition, and not religion, should be abolished. The Roman Empire also made laws condemning those who excited excessive religious fear in others.

During the Middle Ages, the idea of God's influence on the world's events went mostly undisputed. Trials by ordeal were quite frequent, even though Frederick II (1194 – 1250 AD) was the first king who explicitly outlawed trials by ordeal as they were considered "irrational".

The rediscovery of lost classical works (The Renaissance) and scientific advancement led to a steadily increasing disbelief in superstition. A new, more rationalistic lens was beginning to see use in exegesis. Opposition to superstition was central to the Age of Enlightenment. The first philosopher who dared to criticize superstition publicly and in a written form was Baruch Spinoza, who was a key figure in the Age of Enlightenment.

During the European Enlightenment, the modern usage of superstition became increasingly established, with connotations focused on superstition being a form of irrational (non-scientific) thinking, rather than a form of "bad" religious thinking.

== Regional and national superstitions ==
Most superstitions arose over the course of centuries and are rooted in regional and historical circumstances, such as religious beliefs or the natural environment. For instance, geckos are believed to be of medicinal value in many Asian countries, including China.

In China, Feng shui is a belief system that different places have negative effects, e.g. that a room in the northwest corner of a house is "very bad". Similarly, the number 8 is a "lucky number" in China, so that it is more common than any other number in the Chinese housing market.

=== Animals ===
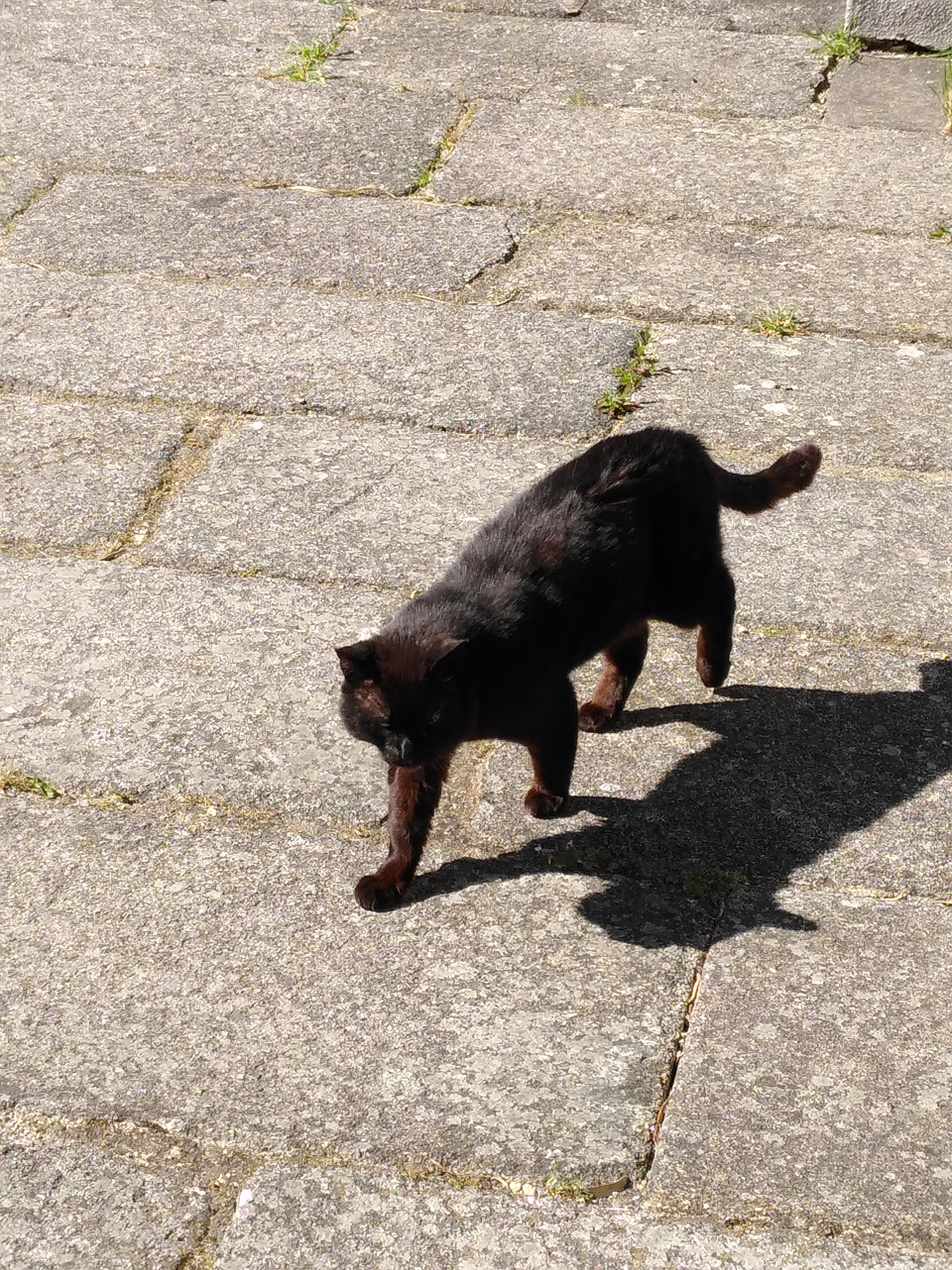
A black cat

There are many different animals around the world that have been tied to superstitions. People in the West are familiar with the omen of a black cat crossing one's path. Locomotive engineers believe a hare crossing one's path is bad luck. According to the International Union for Conservation of Nature (IUCN) the giant anteater (Myrmecophaga tridactyla) is targeted by motorists in regions of Brazil who do not want the creature to cross in front of them and give them bad luck.

The northern cardinal (Cardinalis cardinalis) is associated with receiving visits from heaven according to old folklore. With its name linked to cardinals of the Roman Catholic Church, sightings of the symbolic bird indicate positivity and hope, as described in the quote "Cardinals appear when Angels are near".

=== Numbers ===
Certain numbers hold significance for particular cultures and communities. It is common for buildings to omit certain floors on their elevator panels and there are specific terms for people with severe aversions to specific numbers. Triskaidekaphobia, for example, is the fear of the number 13. Similarly, the number 4 is avoided in many contexts in East Asia, due to the (near-)homophony between the words 四 "four" (Mandarin sì) and 死 "death" (sǐ) in Chinese and languages influenced by it. This is known as tetraphobia (from Ancient Greek τετράς (tetrás) 'four' and Ancient Greek φόβος (phóbos) 'fear'). A widespread superstition is fear of the number 666, given as the number of the beast in the biblical Book of Revelation. This fear is called hexakosioihexekontahexaphobia.

=== Objects ===
There are many objects tied to superstitions. During the Great Depression, it was common for people to carry a rabbit's foot around with them. During the Coronavirus pandemic, people in parts of Indonesia made tetek melek, a traditional homemade mask made of coconut palm fronds, which was hung in doorways to keep occupants safe.

According to superstitions, breaking a mirror is said to bring seven years of bad luck. From ancient Rome to Northern India, mirrors have been handled with care, or sometimes avoided all together.

Horseshoes have long been considered lucky. Opinion is divided as to which way up the horseshoe ought to be nailed. Some say the ends should point up, so that the horseshoe catches the luck, and that the ends pointing down allow the good luck to be lost; others say they should point down, so that the luck is poured upon those entering the home. Superstitious sailors believe that nailing a horseshoe to the mast will help their vessel avoid storms.

In China, yarrow and tortoiseshell are considered lucky and brooms have a number of superstitions attached to them. It is considered bad luck to use a broom within three days of the new year as this will sweep away good luck.

=== Actions ===
Common actions in the West include not walking under a ladder, knocking on wood, throwing salt over one's shoulder after one spills a container, or not opening an umbrella indoors. In China wearing certain colours is believed to bring luck.

"Break a leg" is a typical English idiom used in the context of theatre or other performing arts to wish a performer "good luck". An ironic or non-literal saying of uncertain origin (a dead metaphor), "break a leg" is commonly said to actors and musicians before they go on stage to perform or before an audition. In English (though it may originate in German), the expression was likely first used in this context in the United States in the 1930s or possibly 1920s, originally documented without specifically theatrical associations. Among professional dancers, the traditional saying is not "break a leg", but the French word "merde".

Some superstitious actions have practical origins. Opening an umbrella inside in eighteenth-century London was a physical hazard, as umbrellas then were metal-spoked, clumsy spring mechanisms and a "veritable hazard to open indoors."

Another superstition with practical origins is the action of blowing briefly left and right before crossing rail tracks for safe travels as the person engaging in the action looks both ways.

== See also ==
- Superstition in Britain
- Anthropology – Scientific study of humans, human behavior, and societies
- Curse – Supernatural hindrance, or incantation intended to bestow such a hindrance
- Elite religion – Form of a religion the leaders deem official
- Exorcism – Evicting spiritual entities from a person or area
- Faith – Belief in the teachings of a religion
- Fatalism – Philosophical doctrine on the subjugation of all events to fate
- Folklore – Expressive culture shared by particular groups
- God of the gaps – Theological argument
- Heritage science – Cross-disciplinary scientific research of cultural heritage
- Heritage studies – Academic discipline concerned with cultural heritage
- James Randi – Canadian-American magician and skeptic (1928–2020)
- Kuai Kuai culture – Modern Taiwanese custom
- List of superstitions – List of articles about superstitions
- Lived religion – Religion as practiced in everyday life
- Magical thinking – Belief in the connection of unrelated events
- Occult – Knowledge of the hidden or the paranormal
- Paranormal – Purported phenomena beyond the scope of normal scientific understanding
- Precognition – Paranormal sight of the future
- Pseudoscience – Unscientific claims presented as scientific
- Relationship between religion and science
- Sacred mysteries – Inexplicable or secret religious phenomena
- Synchronicity – Jungian concept of the meaningfulness of acausal coincidences
- Tradition – Long-existing custom or belief
- Urban legend – Form of modern folklore
