= Jeeves and the King of Clubs =

2018 novel by Ben Schott

- First edition (UK)
- Author: Ben Schott
- Language: English
- Published: 2018
- Publisher: Hutchinson (UK); Little, Brown (US)
- ISBN: 978-1-78633-143-4

Jeeves and the King of Clubs is a 2018 novel by Ben Schott, set in P. G. Wodehouse's Jeeves and Wooster universe.

Jeeves and the King of Clubs was produced with the permission of Sir Edward Cazalet, the executor of Wodehouse's estate. In October 2017, the publishing rights were purchased by Hutchinson for a six-figure sum.

== Plot ==
Bertie Wooster learns to his amazement that Jeeves' club for butlers and valets, the Junior Ganymede Club, is actually a front for a secretive arm of the British intelligence services. Because of a series of bizarre events, Bertie must help Jeeves track down and unmask a dangerous spy.

== Reception ==
Reception to the novel was generally positive. Alexander Larman described the novel as "an amusing and well written homage". Ian Sansom described the work as a "bravura performance" and a "bang-on Bertie Wooster reboot". The Times's Matthew Adams called it "a most thrilling return". The Irish Times's Tom Mathews called the work a "pale imitation". Paddy Kehoe for RTÉ gave the work three and a half stars out of five.

Sophie Ratcliffe for The Times Literary Supplement called the work as "Wodehouse for the Brexit era". Tom Williams reviewed the novel for Literary Review.

Schott published a sequel entitled Jeeves and the Leap of Faith in 2020.
