= Schott's Almanac =

- "A Book of the Past & A Song of the Future"
- Author: Ben Schott
- Cover artist: Allison Lang
- Language: English, German
- Genre: Reference
- Published: 14 November 2005 Bloomsbury Publishing PLC
- Publication place: United States, United Kingdom, Germany
- Pages: 352

Schott's Almanac was a best-selling UK reference book, published annually in the United Kingdom between 2006 and 2010. The book was compiled by Ben Schott and published by Bloomsbury Publishing Plc.

In addition to the UK version, the best known (and oldest), two other editions of Schott's Almanac were published, in the United States and Germany. Each Almanac had a different content and structure, and the German edition was in German.

== The Almanac ==
The Almanac presented the world in thirteen† sections:

- Chronicle ("The events of the year, day by day...")
- The World ("The four corners, the three worlds, the seven seas...")
- Society & Health ("From cradle to grave, and everything in between...")
- Media & Celebrity ("From the Big Brother house to the craze of Sudoku...")
- Sci, Tech, Net ("The scientific and technological year dissected...")
- Music & Cinema ("Pop, classical, Hollywood, and art-house...")
- Books & Arts ("Bestsellers, theatre, fashion, events, and exhibitions...")
- Travel & Leisure ("Planes, trains, automobiles, and the rest...");
- Money ("Personal finance, from pay-day to Tax Freedom Day...")
- Parliament & Politics ("The facts and figures behind the spin...")
- Establishment and Faith ("Royalty, nobility, military, and belief...")
- Sport ("Sporting endeavour and achievement...")
- Ephemerides (Key calendar dates and miscellany for the year ahead...).

†In the US edition, this number was changed to a total of fifteen sections, with the addition of:

- The Nation (The state of the Union...)
- The States (The state of the States...)
- Government (Donkey vs Elephant, Dove vs Hawk...)

The aforementioned replace the UK edition's "Parliament" section. Other minor differences in the US edition include, but are not limited to, changing the UK's "The World" to "World & Gazetteer", "Music & Cinema" to "Music & Movies", "Establishment and Faith" to "Form & Faith", as well as rearranging the order of the chapters.
