= Kuai Kuai =

Food company

Kuai Kuai Co, Ltd.

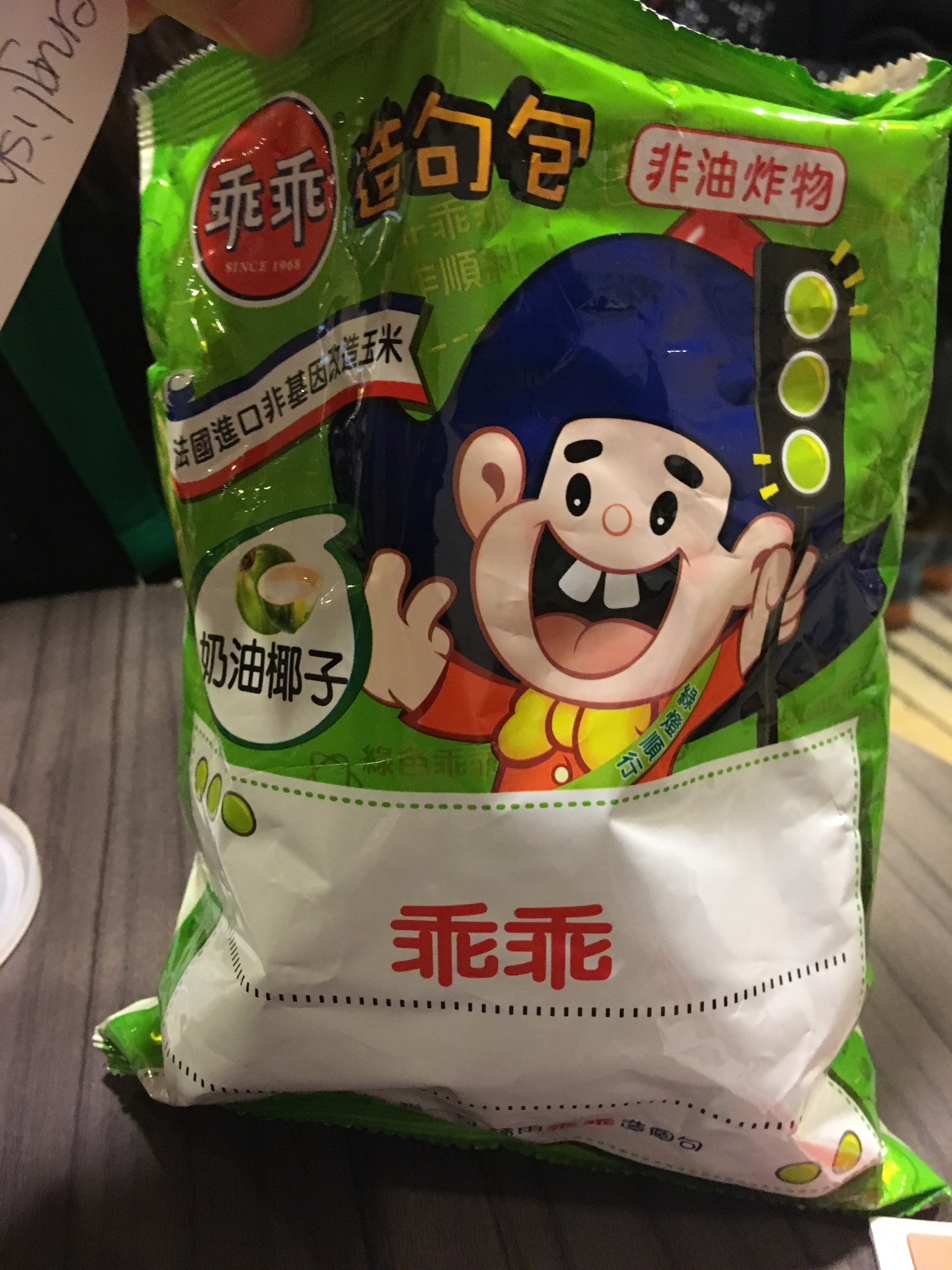
- Type: Privately held conglomerate
- Industry: Snacks
- Founded: 1956
- Headquarters: Taipei, Taiwan
- Key people: Zhong Jiacun (President)
- Website: www.kuai.com.tw

Kuai Kuai Co, Ltd. (Kuai Kuai) is a privately held Taiwanese food production company and is also the name of the puffed corn snacks it manufactures. Kuai Kuai products have been on sale since 1969 and the company officially changed its name to "Kuai Kuai" in 1974.

== History ==
From 1956 to 1967, Liao Jingang founded a pharmaceutical factory in Taipei, Taiwan, initially named "Nan Fang Hong Co., Ltd.," which later became "Dongda Pharmaceutical Co., Ltd." The company shifted its focus to manufacturing biscuits and snack foods in 1968, launching the "Kuai Kuai" series of products aimed at children. Over the years, the company expanded its operations, establishing the Zhongli Factory in 1983. In 1989, Dongda United merged with Kuai Kuai Company, which then focused primarily on biscuits production. In 1993, the company expanded its market to China. In 2013, Liao Jingang died, and his son, Liao Minghui, took over as chairman. Internal strife within the family led to leadership changes in 2018 and 2019, with Sandi Group taking over control of the company. In 2021, Jian Jiafeng assumed the role of general manager.

== Kuai Kuai culture ==
Kuai Kuai culture is a phenomenon in Taiwan wherein people put Kuai Kuai snacks next to or on top of machines. People who do this believe that, because the name of the snack—"Kuai Kuai"—stands for "obedient" or "well-behaved," it will make a device function without errors. As such, it can be commonly found in myriad places of work in Taiwanese society. A rigid set of best practices has arisen surrounding the proper use of Kuai Kuai snacks, such as using green bags only, and ensuring the snacks are not expired.

== See also ==
- List of companies of Taiwan
