= Ben Schott =

British writer & photographer (born 1974)

- Born: 26 May 1974 (age 52); North London, England
- Education: University College School, Hampstead
- Alma mater: Gonville and Caius College, Cambridge
- Writing career
- Notable works: Schott's Miscellany, Schott's Almanac
- Website: benschott.com

Ben Schott (born 26 May 1974) is a British writer, photographer, and author of the Schott's Miscellanies and Schott's Almanac series.

== Early life and university ==
Ben Schott was born in North London, England, the son of a neurologist and a nurse. He has one brother, also now a neurologist. He went to school at University College School, Hampstead.

Schott went to Gonville and Caius College, Cambridge, where he read Social and Political Sciences. He took a double first in 1996.

After Cambridge, Schott got a job at the London advertising agency J. Walter Thompson where he was an account manager on the Nestlé Rowntree account working on Smarties, Kit Kat and Polo. After only four months he resigned to become a freelance photographer.

== Photography ==
Schott worked as a photographer from 1996 to 2003, specialising in portraits of politicians and celebrities. He was commissioned by a range of editorial and commercial clients, including The Independent, The Sunday Times, Sunday Business, Reader's Digest, and the Institute of Directors. A profile by Tim Teeman in The Times said "his subjects included John Prescott, who was rude, and Sir Roy Strong, who had "the most wonderful, doleful eyes" and told him: "You must realise I'm awfully photogenic." Teeman noted that "Tony Blair asked Schott if he would like to see then-baby Leo; Cherie barked at him not to take too long as they were about to have lunch." His photographic portfolio is online.

== Schott's Miscellanies ==
The idea for the first book originated in some cards that Schott made to send to friends, which contained booklets of what he considered vital but hard to find information. Schott typeset the book himself and had 50 copies privately printed by the Pear Tree Press in Stevenage. After sending copies out to his friends, he sent one to the CEO of Bloomsbury, Nigel Newton. Newton told The Boston Globe, "I was completely bowled over when it arrived on my desk. It was a work of striking originality, and it was remarkable to receive an unsolicited submission like this in the mail. I immediately passed it to one of our editors, who signed it up."

Schott's Original Miscellany was published with little fanfare in 2002, but after an article in the Guardian, in which the book was described as the "publishing sensation of the year", sales increased, and within weeks Schott's Original Miscellany was at No. 1. Robert McCrum said of the book in The Observer: "Originality is like charisma. It's hard to define, but we know it when we find it ... Schott's Original Miscellany is, without doubt, the oldest, and possibly merriest title you will come across in a long day's march through the shimmering desert of contemporary publishing".

Schott followed the Original Miscellany with three sequels: Schott's Food & Drink Miscellany, Schott's Sporting, Gaming, & Idling Miscellany and Schott's Quintessential Miscellany. While the first two were best-sellers (Schott had two books simultaneously in the Sunday Times top ten), sales did not match the success of the first book.

== Schott's Almanacs ==
The first edition of Schott's Almanac was published in Britain in 2005, followed by yearly editions published in Britain, America, and Germany until 2010. The Almanacs shared the same look and feel as the Miscellanies – but were substantially longer and larger. Each edition was different, although some content was shared or adapted. The British edition had sections on The World; Society; Media & Celebrity; Music & Movies; Books & Arts; Science & Technology; Parliament & Politics; Form & Faith; The Establishment; Sport; and an Ephemerides section that contains traditional almanac information on dates, moon phases, and the season. The Sunday Times called Schott's Almanac "a social barometer of genuine historical value"; The Boston Globe called it "One of the oddest and most addictively readable reference books in print". Schott introduced the 2006 Almanac with a quote from Ben Hecht: "Trying to determine what is going on in the world by reading newspapers is like trying to tell the time by watching the second hand of a clock".

== Other works ==
In November 2018 his first novel, a pastiche Jeeves book titled Jeeves and the King of Clubs, was published by Little, Brown, and Company. It was written in homage to Jeeves creator P. G. Wodehouse, with the blessing of the Wodehouse Estate. Schott wrote a sequel titled Jeeves and the Leap of Faith that was published in 2020.

Schott publishes a bespoke Miscellany Diary with the society printers Smythson of Bond Street, and a desk-pad diary with Workman.

== Journalism ==
For two years after the publication of the first Miscellany, Schott wrote a weekly miscellany column for The Daily Telegraph, and also produced special miscellany features on Christmas and the Olympics. For over a year he wrote a regular travel miscellany column for the UK edition of Condé Nast Traveler magazine. In 2005 and 2006 the Guardian featured special editions of G2 featuring extracts from Schott's Almanac.

In 2008 Schott was appointed as a contributing columnist for The New York Times OpEd page. He also writes regular features for The Times.

== Design ==
His books are noted for specifying the precise design tools (fonts, leading, etc.) that he employs. He has regularly acknowledged the influence of the work of Edward Tufte in influencing the look and feel of his books.

In 2004, he won a D&AD award for the design of Schott's Food & Drink Miscellany.
