= Percy Fender =

English cricketer (1892-1985)

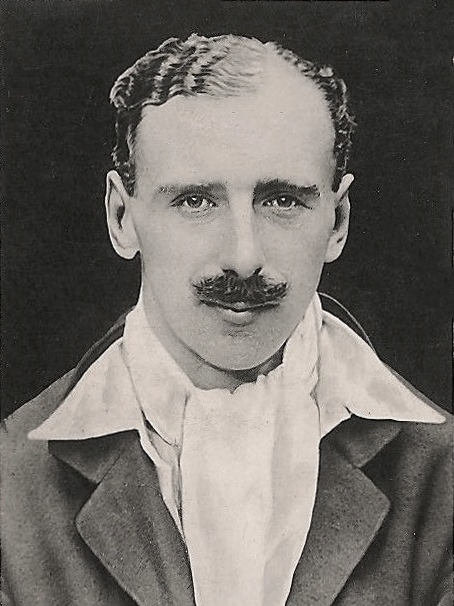
- Fender on a 1922 cigarette card

Personal information
- Full name: Percy George Herbert Fender
- Born: 22 August 1892; Balham, London, England
- Died: 15 June 1985 (aged 92); Exeter, Devon, England
- Nickname: Mossy
- Batting: Right-handed
- Bowling: Right arm medium Leg spin
- Role: All-rounder
- Relatives: Percy Herbert (uncle)

International information
- National side: England
- Test debut (cap 187): 14 January 1921 v Australia
- Last Test: 15 June 1929 v South Africa

Domestic team information
- Years: Team
- 1910–1913: Sussex
- 1914–1935: Surrey
- 1920–1936: MCC

Career statistics
Competition	Test	First-class
Matches	13	557
Runs scored	380	19,034
Batting average	19.00	26.65
100s/50s	0/2	21/103
Top score	60	185
Balls bowled	2,178	95,428
Wickets	29	1,894
Bowling average	40.86	25.05
5 wickets in innings	2	100
10 wickets in match	0	16
Best bowling	5/90	8/24
Catches/stumpings	14/0	602/0
- Source: ESPNCricinfo, 27 January 2009

Percy George Herbert Fender (22 August 1892 – 15 June 1985) was an English cricketer who played 13 Tests for his country and was captain of Surrey between 1921 and 1931. An all-rounder, he was a middle-order batsman who bowled mainly leg spin, and completed the cricketer's double seven times. Noted as a belligerent batsman, in 1920 he hit the fastest recorded first-class century, in terms of time rather than balls received, reaching three figures in only 35 minutes, which remains a record as of 2025. On the basis of his Surrey captaincy, contemporaries judged him the best captain in England.

As early as 1914 Fender was named one of Wisden's Cricketers of the Year. After war service in the Royal Flying Corps he re-established himself in the Surrey team and became captain in 1921. His captaincy inspired the team to challenge strongly for the County Championship over the course of several seasons, despite a shortage of effective bowlers. Alongside his forceful though sometimes controversial leadership, Fender was an effective performer with bat and ball, although he lacked support as a bowler. From 1921, he played occasionally in Tests for England but was never particularly successful. Despite press promptings, he was never appointed Test captain, and following a clash with the highly influential Lord Harris in 1924, his England career was effectively ended. Further disagreements between Fender and the Surrey committee over his approach and tactics led the county to replace him as captain in 1932 and to end his career in 1935.

A very recognisable figure, the amiable Fender was very popular with his team and with supporters. Cartoonists enjoyed caricaturing his distinctive appearance, but he was also well known outside cricket for his presence in bohemian society. In addition to his cricket career, Fender worked in the wine trade, had a successful career in journalism, and wrote several well-received books on cricket tours. He continued working well into the 1970s, even after going blind. He died in 1985 at the age of 92.

== Early life ==
Fender was the elder son of Percy Robert Fender, the director of a firm of stationers, and Lily, née Herbert. Born in Balham, Surrey, in 1892, he was encouraged to play cricket by his mother's family who were involved in Brighton club cricket, and from the age of eight he attended cricket matches to watch Sussex when visiting them. First educated at St George's College, Weybridge, then at St Paul's School, London, Fender did not excel academically, but was proficient in many sports.

At St Paul's, Fender began to attract attention as a cricketer. Awarded his school colours in 1908, he remained in the school team for three years. In 1909, he topped the school's batting averages, scoring a century in one match against Bedford School. In the same game, he was criticised by his schoolmaster for bowling lobs. Fender's success led to his selection for a representing Public Schools XI against the Marylebone Cricket Club (MCC) at Lord's. His success for St Paul's continued in 1910, but his school career came to an abrupt end following an argument between his father and the High Master of the school. The dispute concerned a cricket match which Fender had played without parental permission, and his father was unhappy that cricket was taking precedence over academic studies. Fender was removed from the school immediately; he still came top of the batting averages for 1910 but although selected, he was not allowed to play at Lord's that summer as he was no longer a schoolboy. Despite his successes, St Paul's cricket masters did not consider him a reliable cricketer; he was criticised for taking too many risks when batting and for experimenting with too many different styles while bowling. Fender's biographer, Richard Streeton, observes that "Fender's experiments were frowned upon from his earliest days but ... already there was never any shortage of ideas in his cricket thinking."

== County cricketer before the First World War ==
=== Sussex career ===
While at school, Fender spent his summers with his grandparents in Brighton, which qualified him to play County Cricket for Sussex. When he left school in 1910, he attracted the interest of the club and, after success in both local cricket and second-team matches, he made his first-class debut on 21 July as an amateur in Sussex's County Championship match against Nottinghamshire. He played one other game that season, against Worcestershire, where he was shaken by the pace of two opposing bowlers. In the two games, Fender scored 19 runs and took one wicket.

After the 1910 cricket season, Fender worked in a paper mill in Horwich, Lancashire, to experience paper manufacturing—his father's line of business—at first hand. While feeding paper into a machine, his left hand was trapped in the mechanism and injured. Three of his fingers were crushed at the tips; upon healing, they remained stiff and numb for the rest of his life. Fender remained in Horwich at the start of the 1911 cricket season and played several times for Manchester Cricket Club. He was on the verge of selection for Lancashire when he had to return to Brighton. That season he played twice for Sussex; the following year, in his second match for the county, he scored his maiden first-class century, against Oxford University. He followed this by taking five for 42 (five wickets taken and 42 runs conceded) against Surrey. After these successes, Fender played regularly for the remainder of the 1912 season. In total, he scored 606 runs at an average of 24.24, and, bowling medium pace, took 16 wickets at an average of 25.50.

In 1913, Fender was a regular member of the Sussex county side. In the first two months of the season, he made a considerable impact; in 21 innings with the bat, he scored six fifties and one century. His reputation as an exciting, big-hitting batsman grew quickly, and he was chosen in the representative Gentlemen v Players matches at Lord's and The Oval. His performances for the Gentlemen, a team of amateurs, were unsuccessful, and the failure affected his form for the rest of the season. Wisden Cricketers' Almanack commented that he was not worth his place in the team in these latter months. Even so, he reached 1,000 first-class runs in a season for the first time: 1,163 runs at an average of 23.73. He also took 34 wickets at 35.08.

=== Move to Surrey ===
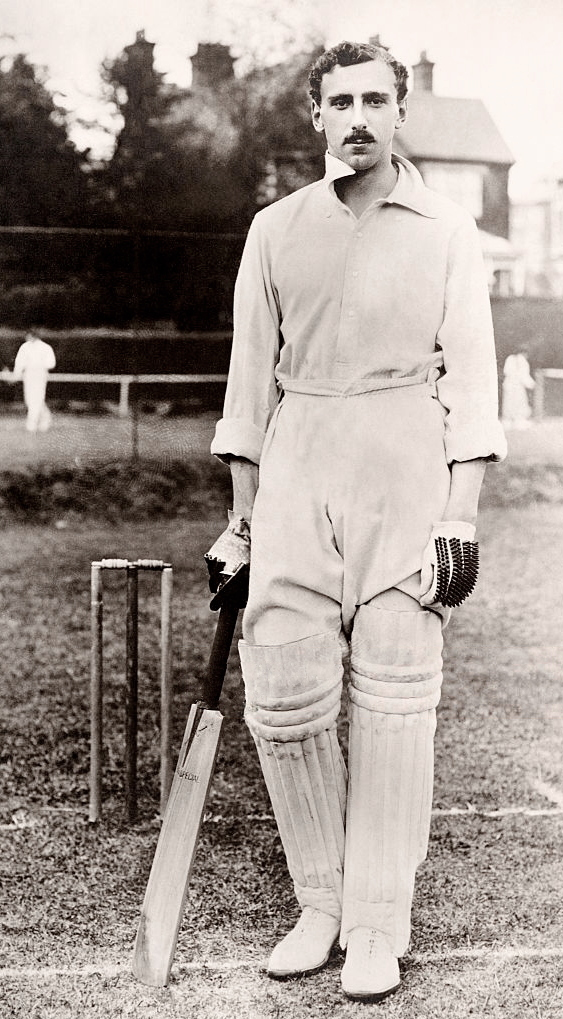
Fender in his early career

Fender initially wanted to be a barrister, but his family could not afford the costs. By 1914, he was working for the firm of paper manufacturers and stationers of which his father was managing director. Although he permitted Fender to play cricket, his father believed that sport and a business career were incompatible. Fender disagreed, suggesting that the influential contacts made in county cricket offset the lost working time. To aid his business career, Fender moved to London during the winter of 1913–14. Fender was qualified by his birthplace to play for Surrey, and the county was eager to register him for the County Championship. Fender attended to business matters before and after each day's play, and often combined Surrey's trips to away matches with business meetings. Socially, Fender became a familiar figure in clubs and at the theatre. He became friends with the actor Jack Hulbert and developed an interest in musical theatre, for which he provided financial support; he also wrote lyrics for some songs. By the end of the 1914 season, Fender had convinced his father that he could successfully combine cricket and business. His improvement as a cricketer was recognised when was chosen as one of Wisden's Cricketers of the Year for 1914.

As a player, Fender quickly made an impact for Surrey. He took a hat-trick in his second game, and scored a century in his fifth, to establish his popularity with the Surrey crowds. During the season Fender scored 820 runs, often very quickly, and took 83 wickets including some through experimenting with leg spin bowling. According to Wisden his worth was measured by more than figures: "As a match winning factor he is a far greater force on a side than his records would suggest." In an already powerful Surrey side he batted aggressively, bowled more frequently than at Sussex—mainly as a support bowler to the main attack—and established a reputation as an excellent slip fielder. A teammate judged that Fender was the "making" of the team, and Wisden commented that "he always seemed the right man in the right place". A late replacement in the Gentlemen v Players game at Lord's, Fender was not particularly successful but made a good impression on critics. The season ended prematurely because of the outbreak of war in August 1914. Surrey had by then established a commanding lead in the County Championship table, and as their nearest challengers had no objection, the MCC declared them as county champions.

=== Career in wartime ===
Immediately following the cancellation of county cricket in 1914, Fender enlisted in the army, joining the Inns of Court Regiment. Commissioned as a lieutenant in the Royal Fusiliers, Fender found he disliked the routine and regimentation of army life, thinking it tedious. With the help of the cricketer Pelham Warner, who worked in the War Office, in 1915 he was transferred to the Royal Flying Corps, which was more to his sense of adventure. Fender was initially stationed in London, where he was involved in work repelling Zeppelin attacks, before being sent to India in 1916. However, soon after his arrival, he became seriously ill with dysentery, possibly cholera and several other diseases. He returned to England to recover but was left weak for much of the following two years. Army doctors were unsure what exactly was wrong with Fender and he remained in their care until 1918. He played some charity cricket in 1917 and 1918, but did not return to light duties with the Royal Flying Corps until the latter year. Just as he seemed to have recovered fully, he fractured his left leg in five places playing football at the end of 1918. He remained on crutches throughout the remainder of 1918 and 1919, missing the resumption of county cricket in 1919. (Note: Fender played football regularly as a goalkeeper. He made appearances for several amateur clubs and in non-League games for Fulham. In addition, he played in Belgium when he spent some time there working for his father. His most notable achievement was to play for the Casuals in the AFA Cup Final in 1913, won 3–2 by his team.) While incapacitated, Fender attempted to gain a place at Caius College, Cambridge, but was turned down owing to the restriction his injury placed upon his cricket, and his stated desire to concentrate on academic interests to further his business career; the university interviewing panel only wanted him as a cricketer. Although he recovered in time to play in the 1920 season, his leg still troubled him for the remainder of his career; he was left with a minor limp, and long spells of fielding left him in pain.

== Captain and leading cricketer ==
=== Appointment as Surrey captain ===
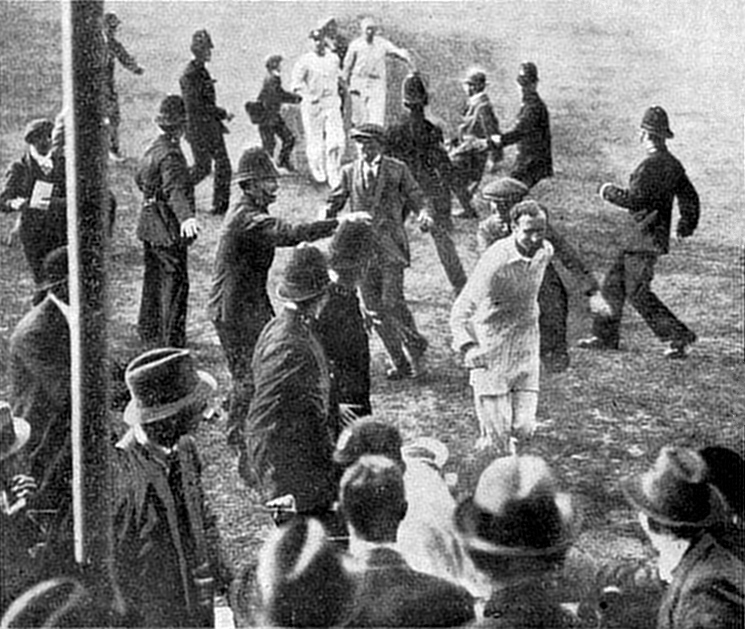
Fender leads Surrey from the field after an unexpected victory over Yorkshire in 1920.

Surrey's official captain for 1920, Cyril Wilkinson, missed much of the 1920 season and was unavailable for the opening matches. As the only amateur in the team who was expected to play regularly, Fender was appointed as captain in Wilkinson's absence. Years later Fender stated that he had found the situation embarrassing, as he realised there were better qualified professional players who could have been appointed instead. He led the team to victory in his first two matches in charge, and ten of his first twelve games. Wilkinson resumed the leadership at several points during the season, but his return in the final weeks coincided with a poor run of results. He consequently withdrew for two crucial games, and allowed Fender to captain the side. That year Surrey had few effective bowlers; Fender was the leading wicket-taker with 109 wickets in County Championship games. In all first-class matches he took 124 wickets at an average of 21.40 to reach 100 wickets in a season for the first time. Inconsistent with the bat, particularly in the latter half of the season, he scored 841 runs at 20.51. In almost every match Fender contributed, either with bat, ball or in the field. His captaincy was very effective; his flair, quick-wittedness, and willingness to use unconventional tactics were most unusual at the time. This was rapidly noticed by the public, who appreciated Surrey's entertaining brand of cricket. Several games were won by Surrey after Fender used unorthodox methods to force the pace. In addition, Fender's batting and bowling performances swayed several games in Surrey's favour. Surrey finished third in the County Championship, but lost their final match, against Middlesex, when a victory would have made them champions. Surrey needed 244 to win but Fender's instruction to his batsmen to attempt to score quickly had an adverse effect, and he later blamed himself for the defeat. Nevertheless, his optimism and inventiveness were appreciated by his teammates and he was appointed permanent captain by the club for the following season.

Against Northamptonshire in one of the last games of the 1920 season, (Note: This was one of the matches in which Fender was not captain.) Surrey had passed Northamptonshire's score and were in a dominant position when Fender batted. He was dropped early on but batting in a carefree, highly aggressive style, reached 100 runs in 35 minutes, as of 2021 still the fastest individual century on record in first-class cricket. (Note: Fender's century is the fastest in terms of minutes batted, not in terms of deliveries faced. Although the number of deliveries faced by Fender was not recorded at the time, subsequent research has suggested his hundred came from between 40 and 46 balls. As of 2021, the first-class hundred from the fewest deliveries came from 34 balls, by David Hookes in October 1982 for South Australia against Victoria. Although other batsmen have scored hundreds in even fewer balls, or in a faster time, these innings are not included in most respected lists of records because they came in intentionally contrived circumstances where the bowlers deliberately aimed to concede runs quickly in order to expedite declarations, and in not genuine match conditions.) In total, he scored 113 not out and shared a partnership of 171 runs in 42 minutes with Alan Peach. Although acknowledged to be a fast innings, Fender's century was not recognised as a record at the time; cricket records were not widely kept or studied, and other innings were believed to have been quicker. Surrey went on to win the match.

Chosen for the Gentlemen v Players, Fender had his first success in the fixture, hitting 50 in 40 minutes, the highest score for the Gentlemen in the match; it may have influenced his selection for the MCC team to tour Australia. Some sections of the press suggested Fender should captain that team, but Reginald Spooner was initially appointed by the MCC; when he was unavailable, J. W. H. T. Douglas became captain. Fender was included in the team, and the press regarded his selection as a formality.

=== Test match cricketer ===
During the MCC tour of Australia, England lost every game of the five-match Test series. (Note: Throughout Fender's career, the MCC organised and administered English cricket. Official English touring teams always played under the name of MCC and were only styled "England" during Test matches.) Fender played infrequently and with little success during the early part of the tour. Douglas rarely used him as a bowler, and for the first Test, he was omitted from the team at the last minute and was twelfth man. He was eventually selected for the third Test; Jack Hearne was unavailable owing to illness, and Fender had recently been successful in a tour game. The tour manager Frederick Toone had suggested that Fender should replace Douglas as captain, an idea which had the support of two of the team's leading professionals, but Douglas refused. Fender made his Test debut on 14 January 1921 but achieved little with bat or ball, partly owing to his lack of match practice in the preceding weeks. He dropped a catch from Charles Kelleway, who went on to score 147 runs. Nevertheless, Fender retained his place in the team for the remainder of the series. In the fourth Test, he took five for 122, and achieved five for 90 in the fifth and final game. He led the English Test bowling averages with 12 wickets at an average of 34.16, and was the only England spin bowler to make the ball turn on the hard Australian pitches, though he was not particularly accurate. With the bat, he scored 59 in the fourth Test and passed 40 in two other innings. In the last game of the tour, against South Australia, Fender took 12 wickets, including seven for 75 in the first innings. In general, he withstood the hot weather better than his teammates, but his weak leg made fielding painful on the hard ground. In all first-class games on the tour, he scored 325 runs at 27.08 and took 32 wickets at 32.71.

As an amateur, Fender was not paid for the tour, but some of his expenses were paid by the MCC. However, tours at the time often left many amateurs out of pocket. To offset their costs, Fender and his teammate Rockley Wilson wrote for several newspapers and magazines during the tour. Their comments were unpopular in Australia, particularly in the final Test when Wilson criticised the behaviour of the Australian spectators. Fender was barracked several times by the crowds when reports reached Australia of his newspaper columns; occasionally, the crowds chanted "Please Go Home Fender", making a play on his initials. Fender made light of this, joining in by conducting the barrackers. In subsequent tours, the MCC forbade cricketers from writing about matches in which they were playing. On his way home, Fender wrote an account of the tour which was published as Defending the Ashes. However, he did not elaborate on his own opinions, and left out any controversy.

The Australian team joined the MCC cricketers on the journey to England, to play a further five Tests in 1921. Once again, some newspapers suggested Fender should captain the England team, but Douglas was initially retained; as the series progressed, several writers lamented the fact that Fender was overlooked. Fender began the season poorly and was not picked for the first three Tests, all of which were won by Australia. The England selectors tried 30 players in the course of the summer, many of whom critics did not consider to be of suitable quality. Fender began to take wickets consistently in the middle of the season, and scored a century in the Gentlemen v Players match, so he was chosen for the fourth Test. The game was drawn, affected by rain. Fender scored 44 not out and took two for 30 in the game. The final match was also a rain-ruined draw; Fender retained his place but had little success. He later said that he learned a great deal from Warwick Armstrong's captaincy of the Australians.

Fender had greater success for Surrey in 1921. For the second year in succession Surrey played Middlesex in the final game of the season, to decide the County Championship, and again they lost. They finished second in the table, but were hampered throughout the season by a lack of quality bowling. Wisden praised Fender's intelligent handling of his modest bowling resources, and stated that much of Surrey's success came from his captaincy. Several of Surrey's victories were very close, and had come after Fender declared. Fender took the brave decision to include a lob bowler, Trevor Molony, in three games; lob bowling had practically died out from first-class cricket by this time, and Molony was the last specialist underarm bowler selected in county cricket. But Molony met with fairly limited success and faded out of cricket. Owing to the lack of penetrative alternatives, Fender had to use his own bowling frequently, and often conceded many runs. Wisden said he was generally effective with the ball and described his slip fielding as "dazzling", but suggested that perhaps his best batting came for teams other than Surrey. In all first-class matches Fender completed the double of 1,000 runs and 100 wickets for the first time; he scored 1,152 runs at 21.33 and took 134 wickets at 26.58. He also took 53 catches to become the first cricketer to pass 50 catches while completing the double; as of 2021, only Peter Walker has also done so.

=== Peak in county cricket ===
A cartoon by Tom Webster showing Fender, wearing glasses for the first time, scoring 185 against Hampshire.

Fender completed the double in 1922 with 1,169 runs and 157 wickets, Surrey finished third in the Championship, and once again the lack of effective bowling hindered the team. Wisden described the team's success as "nothing less than a triumph for Mr Fender". Despite damp weather which did not suit his style, he bowled more than his share of overs, often because there were few alternative bowlers. Wisden said: "Essentially a change bowler [one who bowls while the main bowlers are rested]—the best in England, as he has been aptly described—he became by force of circumstances the chief attacking force". He bowled mainly leg spin, but often bowled successfully at medium pace. Wisden praised his inspirational captaincy, and concluded: "Over and above all this he was, by general consent, by far the best of the county captains, never losing his grip of the game and managing his side with a judgement that was seldom at fault." During the season, Fender began to wear glasses in an attempt to cure headaches; the remedy worked, although he later discovered there was nothing wrong with his eyesight, and the lenses he wore were little more than plain glass. The first time he wore glasses, Fender scored 185 in 130 minutes against Hampshire. Other rapid scoring feats included 91 in 50 minutes against Leicestershire and 137 in 90 minutes against Kent. There were no Tests in 1922, but Sydney Pardon wrote that Fender was the only amateur who could be guaranteed a place on ability alone in an England team. Late in the season, Fender was involved in a public dispute with Lord Harris over the qualification of Alfred Jeacocke to play for Surrey. Harris, the influential treasurer of the MCC and chairman of Kent, had noticed that Jeacocke's qualification had lapsed when he moved across the border from Surrey to Kent, albeit living on the same road. Fender, privately furious with Harris, publicly defended Jeacocke, and the press supported him; the rules were altered the following season to allow Jeacocke to continue to play for Surrey.

Fender was chosen in the MCC team to tour South Africa in 1922–23, but despite support from journalists, he was not chosen as captain. Frank Mann led the team; his appointment was criticised in the press, which judged him to lack playing ability and suggested that the selectors favoured those associated with Lord's—Mann was Middlesex captain. Mann appointed Fender his vice-captain on the journey to South Africa, but played every match on the tour to leave Fender with no opportunity to lead the side. England won the Test series 2–1, but Fender had some difficulties playing on the matting pitches used in South Africa, (Note: Matting pitches were used as an alternative to turf in some parts of the world where it was difficult to produce a good grass pitch. The matting was made of jute or coir, and laid over a surface which may have been sand, grass, soil or gravel.) on which the ball bounced and turned in a different fashion from the turf on which cricket was played in England. He began in good batting form, scoring 96 in the first match, and he passed fifty on two other occasions, including an uncharacteristically defensive innings of 60 in the third Test, but his batting faded as the tour progressed. He was generally successful as a bowler, but proved expensive in the Tests. However, his best bowling performance according to his teammates came in the second Test, when he took four for 29 on the first day; all the South Africans found it difficult to bat against him, and he later described it as one of the best bowling spells of his career. He played in all five Tests, scoring 128 runs at an average of 14.22 and taking 10 wickets at 41.80, while in all first-class games, he scored 459 runs at 22.95 and took 58 wickets at 19.58.

In 1923 Fender enjoyed his best all-round season, scoring 1,427 runs and taking 178 wickets. The former was the second best aggregate of his career, the latter his highest total of wickets. Again, there were no Test matches, but Fender played in two Test trials. He was successful in the first match, taking six for 44 and scoring 49 runs, but his performance was overshadowed by continued controversy over the captaincy; Fender was not asked to captain a side in either match. The press questioned why the selectors ignored Fender's captaincy claims even though, in the view of journalists, he was the most deserving candidate. One writer suggested that Lord's "resented" Fender's success, and that politics prevented his appointment. At that time it was usual for amateurs and professionals to enter the field of play from different gates; Fender's habit was to use the same gate as his professionals. This brought a rebuke for Fender from Lord Harris, who said: "We do not want that sort of thing at Lord's, Fender". Surrey finished fourth in the Championship, hampered once again by their lack of bowlers; their batsmen frequently made large scores but the team could not bowl out the opposition and many games were drawn. Fender's batting continued to be effective, but he demonstrated a more restrained approach and improved his defence. Again, he had a heavy bowling workload given the lack of support, and Wisden said that he bowled with "pronounced spin and variety of device".

=== Controversy and loss of England place ===
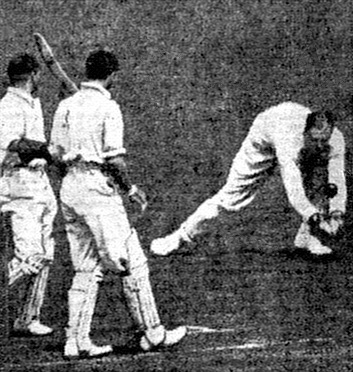
Fender fielding in 1922

Fender's form dipped in 1924 after a good start with bat and ball; thereafter, despite occasional successes, he lacked consistency. Surrey finished third in the Championship, and Fender contributed 1,004 runs and 84 wickets in all first-class matches. Once again, Fender was a candidate for the England captaincy—South Africa played a Test series that season, and the MCC were to tour Australia in 1924–25. The eventual appointment of Arthur Gilligan was criticised in the press, which again speculated why Fender was not chosen. Fender's prospects of leading England receded further when he clashed once more with Lord Harris. The MCC had rebuked two county committees for covering their pitches prior to matches against the South Africans during a spell of wet weather. Fender pointed out in a letter published by the press that Lord Harris and the MCC were aware that this was common practice at the Scarborough Festival, despite their claims to the contrary. When Fender next played at Lord's, the furious Lord Harris summoned Fender to admonish him. Fender always regretted his indiscretion and believed it finished any chance he had of the England captaincy. Fender played in the first two Tests, without much success, and was dropped; he played only one more Test in his career. Gilligan was injured during the series, but the selectors recalled Douglas as captain rather than select Fender. When the team to tour Australia that winter was chosen, Fender was not selected, a decision which upset him deeply. Fender was married at the end of the 1924 cricket season, and in the off-season wrote about the MCC tour of Australia for the Daily Express.

In 1925, Fender returned to his best form, completing the double with 1,042 runs and 137 wickets. Surrey finished second in the table and by the end of the season had not lost a Championship match at the Oval for five years. However, they never challenged the champions, Yorkshire, and this proved to be the last time under Fender's leadership that the team finished near the top of the Championship table. In the view of the press, Fender remained a potential England captain for the Ashes series in 1926, but Arthur Carr was chosen. In his survey of England cricket captains, Alan Gibson suggests that Fender and Carr were the only two realistic candidates by that time—other county captains either lacked the skill to play Tests or had already been tried and discarded. When Carr was dropped before the final Test, the journalist Home Gordon reported that a "certain amateur"—Gibson suggests this must have been Fender—was waiting by the phone for news that he was to captain England. In the event, Percy Chapman took over for the final match and England regained the Ashes. However, Streeton believes that by this stage, Fender was never likely to be chosen; he played in a Test trial match and for the Gentlemen against the Players, but Greville Stevens was preferred in the England team. In all first-class matches, Fender completed the double again with 1,043 runs and 112 wickets. After the season, he joined a short tour of Jamaica led by Lord Tennyson, playing three first-class matches.

== Final years ==
=== Late 1920s ===
In the following seasons, Surrey dropped steadily down the Championship table. Fender failed to reach 1,000 runs in 1927, although his average of 31.96 was his best for five seasons; he also took 89 wickets at 25.75. That season, he achieved one of the best bowling performances of his career when he took six wickets in 11 balls against Middlesex, to become the first player in first-class cricket to take six wickets in so few deliveries. This remained a record until 1972 when Pat Pocock took seven wickets in 11 balls. Fender went on to take seven wickets in 19 balls; his final analysis was seven for 10. The following two seasons were his best with the bat; in 1928, he scored 1,376 runs at 37.18, his highest average in a season, and in 1929 he scored 1,625 runs, his highest run aggregate. He was less successful with the ball: in 1928 he took 110 wickets but his bowling average rose to 28, and took 88 wickets at an average of over 30 in 1929. His good form at the start of 1929 led to his recall to the England team, and he played one Test against South Africa. This was his final Test; overall, in 13 Tests, he scored 380 runs at an average of 19.00 and took 29 wickets at 40.86. By that season, Surrey had fallen to tenth in the table.

=== Involvement with Bradman and Bodyline ===
During the MCC tour to Australia in 1928–29, the Australian batsman Donald Bradman made his Test debut. Covering the tour as a journalist, Fender judged that Bradman "was one of the most curious mixtures of good and bad batting I have ever seen", but was not convinced by his ability at the time. Bradman came to England with the Australian touring team in 1930, and was extremely successful; during the course of the season, Fender completely changed his mind—not least when Bradman, particularly determined to succeed against Fender following his criticism, scored 252 against Surrey. Fender played fewer matches than in previous seasons, as he was writing on the Tests for a newspaper; in the 1930 season, he scored 700 runs and took 65 wickets. Meanwhile, the Australian victory in the Test series owed much to Bradman, who scored 974 runs in seven innings, breaking several records in the process. His success, and the manner of it, concerned the English authorities, and Fender among others believed that success against Bradman was to be found in adopting new tactics. In his newspaper reports that summer, Fender was critical of Bradman during one spell in the final Test when he batted unconvincingly against fast bowler Harold Larwood on a pitch affected by rain. Fender passed this information on to his Surrey colleague Douglas Jardine, who was later named England captain for the MCC tour of 1932–33. Over the following months, Australian journalists kept Fender informed of developments in batting in that country, information which he passed on to Jardine. Jardine later conceived the strategy of Bodyline, where fast bowlers bowled at the batsmen's leg stump, frequently pitching the ball short and hitting him. The tactic was contentious, and created much ill-feeling between the players. Fender did not cover the tour as a journalist, as his newspaper sent Jack Hobbs instead. However, during the tour Jardine wrote to inform Fender that much of his information had been correct and that he was adapting his tactics accordingly. Fender later insisted that his role was minor in creating the strategy, but he was close to both Jardine and Arthur Carr, who discussed the plans before the tour began; some writers suggested that the original idea was Fender's.

=== Resignation and retirement ===
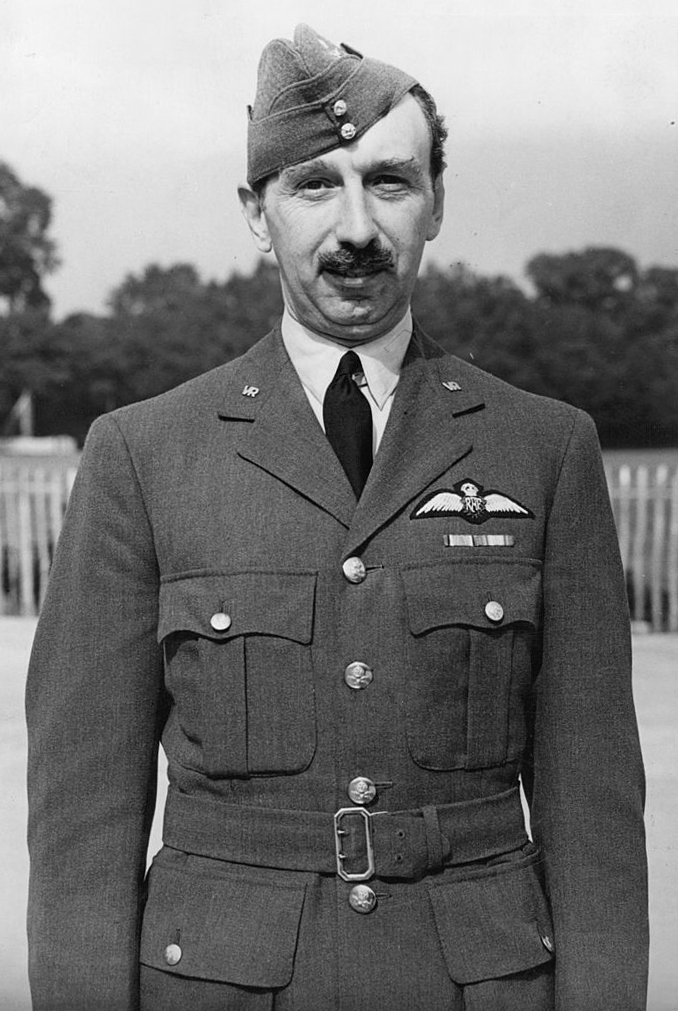
Fender in September 1940

Early in 1931 Fender offered to resign as Surrey's captain, to give Jardine more experience of leadership before he assumed the England captaincy, but Surrey declined. Fender scored 916 runs and took 84 wickets that season. However, the Surrey committee were becoming disillusioned with Fender as captain after he had missed matches in 1930 to work as a journalist. Another point of contention was that Fender, against the wishes of the committee, preferred to keep in-form professional players in the team instead of playing amateurs when they were available. There were disagreements over expenses, and the committee disapproved when Fender declared Surrey's innings closed after one ball, to make up time in a rain-affected match. A series of other controversial incidents further antagonised the committee. As a result, Fender was dismissed in January 1932, a move rumoured in the press for some time and which was quickly leaked. The club released a statement which said Fender would only stand down if a suitable replacement could be found, before Jardine was officially appointed in March. It is likely that the uncertainty arose because Jardine took his time in accepting the position. Fender supported Jardine's appointment, and pledged to continue playing under his captaincy.

Fender played less frequently in the following seasons, as his appearances were restricted by journalistic and business requirements. He scored over 400 runs in each season between 1932 and 1935 and scored two centuries in that time, both in 1933. With the ball, he took over 60 wickets in each season, although with higher bowling averages than earlier in his career. Having played regularly for the Gentlemen against the Players throughout his career, he made his last appearance in the match in 1934. He continued to be an effective member of the county team, which he occasionally led when the regular captain—initially Jardine, later, Errol Holmes—was absent. Prior to the 1936 season Holmes suggested to Fender that he should play fewer games for Surrey that year. Rather than do so, Fender preferred not to play at all, and he informed the committee that he would no longer represent the county. The committee publicly thanked Fender, but the reasons for the sudden termination of his county career are unclear; rumours suggested that some factions at Surrey wanted Fender out of the club. In the event, Fender played two first-class matches in 1936, captaining MCC teams against Oxford and Cambridge universities; these were his final appearances in first-class cricket. In all first-class matches, he scored 19,034 runs at an average of 26.65, and took 1,894 wickets at 25.05. He continued to play minor cricket for some time, and maintained his association with the sport for many years. His most notable appearance came after the war, when he captained an "Old England XI", featuring many former England players, against Surrey in 1946 in a match to celebrate Surrey's centenary.

During the Second World War, Fender joined the Royal Air Force, reaching the rank of Wing Commander. He worked in southern England with a responsibility for moving men and equipment, and was mentioned in dispatches for his role in preparations for the Allied invasion of Europe. Later, he was posted to various parts of the world in his role in movements.

In the 1920s, Fender was approached four times to stand for Parliament as a Conservative Party candidate and declined each time. Between 1952 and 1958, he served as a Conservative member on the London County Council for Norwood and later was appointed Deputy Lieutenant of London. In the late 1970s, Fender became blind, and moved in with his daughter, although continuing to run his business. He travelled to Australia in 1977 to attend celebrations that marked 100 years of Test cricket and was the oldest man there.

In 1983, Fender's 35-minute record for the fastest ever first-class century was equalled by Steven O'Shaughnessy in contrived circumstances. Fender sent a congratulatory telegram to O'Shaughnessy and the two subsequently met, Fender joking about keeping O'Shaughnessy's bat as a souvenir.

In his final years, he moved into a nursing home and died there on 15 June 1985.

== Style and technique ==
=== Batting, bowling and fielding ===
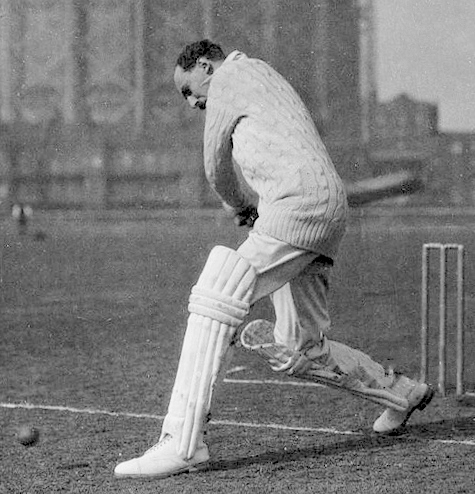
Fender batting at the Oval in 1925

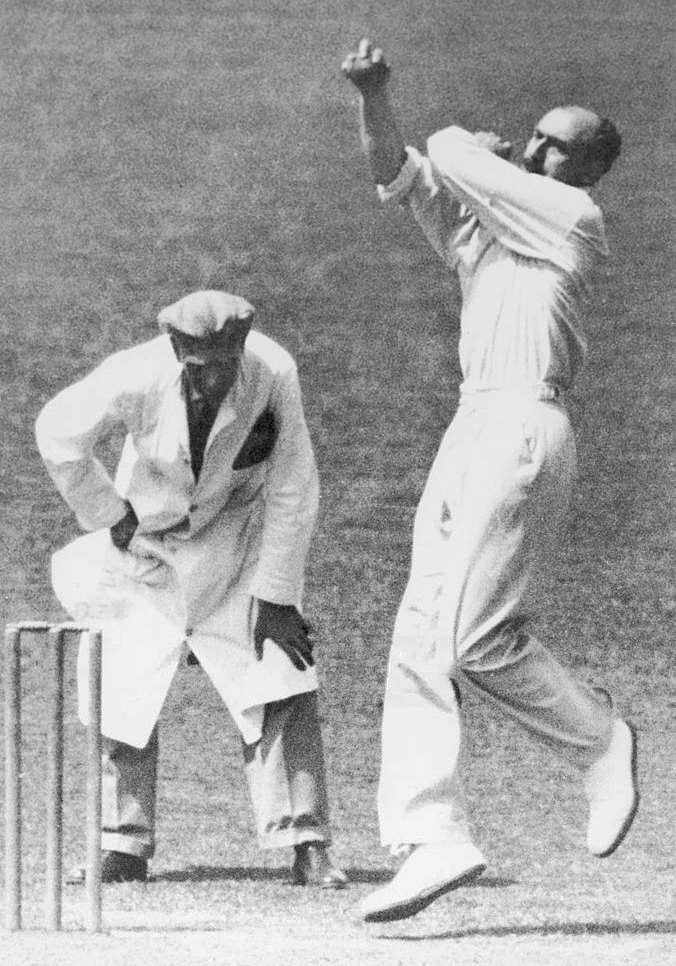
Fender bowling in 1935

As a batsman, Fender's approach was aggressive; whatever the circumstances he hit the ball very hard, and his ability to play a variety of strokes made it difficult for captains to place fielders effectively. He batted with his weight mainly on his front foot and used powerful wrist-work to send the ball in different directions while playing the same stroke. Among his favoured shots were the drive, pull and cut. Other than his 35-minute century, he played many innings in which he scored quickly, and the cricket historian Gerald Brodribb has calculated that Fender was among first-class cricket's fastest scorers, with an average rate of 62 runs an hour. He also recorded several notably powerful hits, including one which sent the ball 132 yards. Fender's aggressive approach made him an inconsistent scorer, but Surrey had a strong batting side and his hitting power was more valuable to the team than if he had played in more orthodox fashion. The side's batting strength meant that Fender rarely had to play defensively, although he could do so if the situation demanded.

Originally a fast-medium bowler—a style to which he sometimes reverted when Surrey were short of bowlers—Fender's main bowling style was wrist spin, and he could spin the ball effectively. His googly was more of a top spinner and he was adept at using flight and dip, with many of his wickets being bowled or caught behind the wicket.

He gripped the ball differently from most wrist spinners, using his thumb and first two fingers, and would attempt any kind of unorthodox delivery if he thought it might be effective. To deceive the batsman he varied the position from which he bowled and the height of his arm, and occasionally bowled deliberate full tosses or long hops to surprise them. Fender hoped that, in his eagerness to score from an apparently innocuous ball, the batsman would mis-hit, a tactic he would often try when the batsman was playing defensively. Fender's love of experimentation and his surprise variations made him difficult for batsmen to face, but produced inconsistent results and he sometimes conceded many runs. His Wisden obituary suggests that Fender would have been better employed as a "fourth or fifth bowler in a strong bowling side", but Surrey's weakness in bowling meant that he had to do far more work than was ideal for his style and approach. Despite his experimentation, critics regarded him as a reliable bowler using his primary method, and The Times described him as "subtle in flight and with artful variations".

Fender fielded mainly at slip. He possessed quick reactions and could move quickly to catch balls hit some distance from him. His technique was unorthodox; he crouched low when waiting for the ball with one leg stretched behind him, like a sprinter ready to begin a race. Good catching was vital in a Surrey side which possessed weak bowling, making his contributions even more important, and critics regarded him as one of the best slip fielders in England.

The journalist and cricket writer John Arlott wrote of Fender: "Unmistakable on the field, lanky, bespectacled, curly-haired, slouching along, hands deep in pockets and wearing a grotesquely long sweater, he was immortalised by cartoonist Tom Webster". This appearance made him a favourite of cartoonists generally, and Fender enjoyed this fame, particularly the cartoons of Webster who drew Fender in a long sweater before he ever wore one; Fender then adopted them to match his image. Similarly, he continued to wear glasses on the field after discovering that he did not need them.

=== Captaincy ===
Contemporary critics believed that Fender's handling of a limited bowling side while Surrey captain in the 1920s, and his achievements in taking the county to high positions in the County Championship, made him the best captain in England. Teammates and opponents praised his captaincy skills, and described him as the best they had known. His Times obituary stated: "[Fender] was a sharp captain, quick to observe the slightest opportunity of advantage and ready to gamble on his ability to exploit it. His keen eye for weakness in an opponent and ability to extract and employ the best powers of his own players caused him often, and with reason, to be described as the best county captain who never captained England. No more flexible thinker on cricket ever lived." Always willing to take risks in order to win, Fender's main objective was to surprise the opposition; legends grew of his successful ploys. Prior to Fender, few county captains displayed tactical imagination; Fender inspired his teams to play forceful, entertaining cricket which made him and his Surrey team very popular. His leadership was often specifically commented on by the press, an unusual occurrence in county cricket reports. In particular, his declarations often were the subject of attention and controversy—he often declared, contrary to orthodox tactics at the time, before his side had built up a big lead or even before they reached the opposition's first innings total. One of his favoured approaches was for the batsmen in the lower middle-order to hit out at the bowling, no matter the state of the match; if successful, the team either quickly consolidated a position of strength or regained the initiative if earlier batsmen had failed. Fender also used non-regular bowlers in an attempt to unsettle batsmen. His innovative approach included the introduction of caps with larger peaks to shade his players' eyes from the sun, and he recruited a baseball coach to improve their throwing.

Although often a candidate in the press to captain England, Fender was never chosen to do so. Rumours circulated at the time about the reasons. One suggestion was that he was overlooked because he was Jewish, but Fender said he was not Jewish and in any case did not believe this would have been a problem. Other purported reasons included that he had not been to Oxford or Cambridge, and that he was in the wine trade, which was considered an unsuitable career for a gentleman, but in later life Fender dismissed these as potential factors. In fact, not everyone approved of Fender's captaincy. He was sometimes accused of gamesmanship, for example by persuading umpires that conditions were unfit for play until they favoured his team. He occasionally used negative tactics when he was unhappy with the approach of the opposition—in one game where the opposition had not declared, he slowed down play to the extent that one over took 12 minutes to bowl. Opponents recalled other uses of time-wasting tactics, deliberate damaging of the pitch by Surrey players to assist their bowlers, and intimidation of both the opposition and umpires. The cricket writer Martin Williamson suggests that "in an era where gentlemen played by the rules, Fender was adroit at stretching the Laws to snapping point." Fender's attitude towards amateurs also brought him into opposition with others. His disinclination to play amateurs in the Surrey team unless they were talented enough was opposed by the Surrey committee—the Surrey president, H. D. G. Leveson Gower, wished Fender to include friends and contacts whom Fender did not consider worth a place in the team. According to E. W. Swanton: "While always highly popular with the teams he led, his relations with the Surrey authorities were also apt to be difficult." Fender attempted to unite the amateurs and professionals in the team through using one gate to enter the field, and stopped the practice of separate lunches and teas. He planned to end the tradition of using separate changing rooms, until stopped by the professional Hobbs. Fender's proposals shocked senior cricket figures, and caused another clash with the influential Lord Harris; allied to other disagreements between the pair, it may have ended his England career. The deeply conservative cricket establishment may also have resented Fender's unorthodoxy on the cricket pitch. Fender made himself more unacceptable by mocking establishment figures such as Leveson Gower; a teammate later remarked that Fender "was often his own worst enemy". Fender also believed that the controversy over his journalism in 1921 counted against him with the MCC committee. According to Wisden, Fender's limited success at Test level "may have saved the selectors, who were thought never to favour him as a captain of England, an embarrassing problem". His Wisden obituary concluded: "He was one of the most colourful figures in the cricket world for many years ... and was widely regarded as the shrewdest county captain of his generation".

== Cricket journalism ==
While still a cricketer, Fender wrote for several London newspapers and magazines, and also broadcast on the radio. Although remaining in England, he commented on the 1924–25 Ashes series for the Sunday Express and became involved in an argument which arose during the tour over the merits of professional captaincy; Fender believed professionals would make good captains. He also wrote about the 1926 series, and drew criticism from Australians when he called their sportsmanship into question. He later wrote regularly for the Evening News and The Star; to the irritation of other journalists, he became the first man to use a typewriter in the press box.

Fender wrote four books on cricket tours: his 1920–21 account Defending the Ashes, an account of the 1928–29 tour which he covered as a journalist, and books about the 1930 and 1934 Australian tours of England. A fifth book, An ABC of Cricket, more autobiographical in nature, followed in 1937. The Times described Fender as "an astute critic of the game" whose accounts were "well-observed and analytical". Wisden found his writing outspoken at times, but rated his four tour books as among the best available. In 2012, the cricket journalist Steven Lynch wrote that Fender "can probably be credited with revolutionising the [cricket] tour book. Previously they were often travelogues, but Fender included serious in-depth analysis of the play, backed up with copious statistics".

== Personal life ==
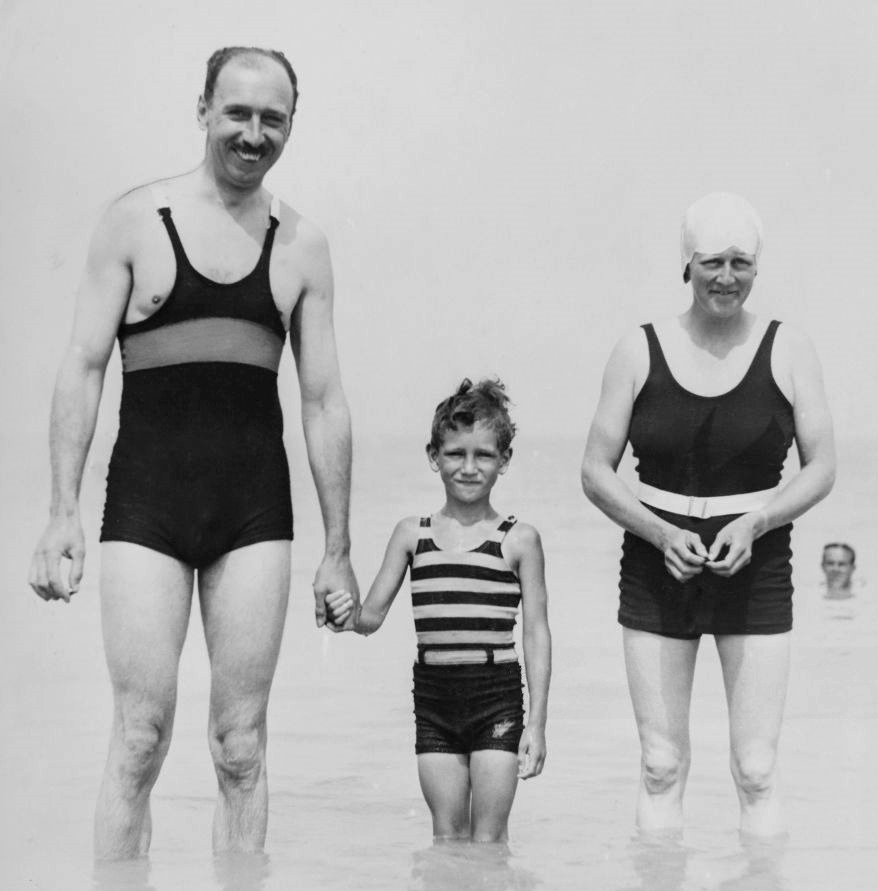
Fender on holiday with family in 1933 in Kent

Fender worked for his father's stationery business, including periods spent in France and Belgium, up until the outbreak of war in 1914, but when he returned from active service found the business frustrating. With his father's approval, he left the firm to start his own wine business with his brother Robert. The business thrived, in part owing to Fender's wide range of connections, and he remained chairman and managing director of the company until 1976. For a time, Fender produced his own whiskey brand, which he tried to sell when touring South Africa with the MCC in 1922–23, but strong competition from the larger distilling companies meant that it was only a short-lived success. After the Second World War, he had to rebuild his wine firm, which had suffered from wartime trade restrictions and hardships, this time assisted by his son. He and Robert also established a paper merchants called Fender Brothers, although he later relinquished his shares in the company. Meanwhile, he maintained his connections with Crescens Robinson and followed his father as chairman of the company from 1943 to 1968.

The press closely followed the flamboyant Fender's activities in his personal life, reporting his attendance and activities at dances, the theatre, horse races and shooting. As such, he had a high profile, and was easily recognisable to the general public. In September 1924, he married Ruth Clapham, a well-known figure in society and the daughter of a Manchester jeweller, whom he had met in Monte Carlo in 1923. The couple had two children; Ruth died suddenly in 1937 from Bright's disease. Fender remarried in 1962, but his second wife, Susan Gordon, died in 1968.

== In popular culture ==
Fender was played in the Bodyline miniseries by John Gregg. The series represents Fender as a bon viveur who had a considerable influence on the young Douglas Jardine, and is seen as epitomising an English establishment disdain for Don Bradman on his emergence as a Test cricketer. The series appears to exaggerate Fender's reluctance about giving up the captaincy of Surrey for Jardine.

== Bibliography ==
These are the books of which Fender was the main author.

- Defending the Ashes (The tour of the M.C.C. team in Australia, 1920–21). London: Chapman and Hall. 1921. OCLC 559986543.
- The Turn of the Wheel: M.C.C. team, Australia, 1928–1929. London: Faber and Faber. 1929. OCLC 752829492.
- The tests of 1930: the 17th Australian team in England. London: Faber and Faber. 1930. OCLC 155909714.
- Kissing the rod: the story of the Tests of 1934. London: Chapman and Hall. 1934. OCLC 35365291.
- An ABC of cricket. London: Arthur Barker. 1937. OCLC 9599314.

== Sources ==
- Douglas, Christopher (2002). Douglas Jardine: Spartan Cricketer. London: Methuen. ISBN 0-413-77216-0.
- Frith, David (2002). Bodyline Autopsy. The full story of the most sensational Test cricket series: Australia v England 1932–33. London: Aurum Press. ISBN 1-85410-896-4.
- Gibson, Alan (1979). The Cricket Captains of England. London: Cassell. ISBN 0-304-29779-8.
- Hilton, Christopher (2009). Bradman and the Summer that Changed Cricket: The 1930 Australian Tour of England. London: JR Books. ISBN 978-1-906779-02-3.
- Marshall, Michael (1987). Gentlemen and Players: Conversations with Cricketers. London: Grafton Books. ISBN 0-246-11874-1.
- McKinstry, Leo (2011). Jack Hobbs: England's Greatest Cricketer. London: Yellow Jersey Press. ISBN 978-0-224-08329-4.
- Streeton, Richard (1981). P. G. H. Fender: A Biography. London: Faber & Faber. ISBN 0-571-11635-3.
- Wynne-Thomas, Peter (1989). The Complete History of Cricket Tours at Home and Abroad. London: Guild Publishing. OCLC 440099345.

Preceded by Jack MacBryan	Oldest Living Test Cricketer; 14 July 1983 – 15 June 1985	Succeeded by Stork Hendry
