= Streeton =

Streeton is a surname. Notable people with the surname include:

- Arthur Streeton (1867–1943), Australian landscape painter
- George H. Streeton (1864–?), American architect
- Richard Streeton (1930–2006), English journalist
- Terence Streeton (1930–2017), British diplomat

== See also ==
- Division of Streeton
