= Trevor Molony =

English cricketer

Cricket information
- Batting: Right-handed
- Bowling: Right-arm slow

Career statistics
| Competition | First-class |
|---|---|
| Matches | 3 |
| Runs scored | 2 |
| Batting average | 0.50 |
| 100s/50s | 0/0 |
| Top score | 2 |
| Balls bowled | 198 |
| Wickets | 4 |
| Bowling average | 22.25 |
| 5 wickets in innings | 0 |
| 10 wickets in match | 0 |
| Best bowling | 3/11 |
| Catches/stumpings | 0/– |
- Source: CricketArchive, 8 November 2022

Trevor James Molony (6 July 1897 – 3 September 1962) was a cricketer who played for Surrey. He is considered as the last lob bowler to play first-class cricket purely as a bowler.

Trevor Molony studied at Repton and Pembroke College, Cambridge. He appeared in but did not take any wickets in the Freshers match but another fine performance for his college won the attention of Digby Jephson. Jephson, himself a former first-class cricketer who bowled underarm, who was then involved in Cambridge cricket, recommended him for Surrey's pre-season trial match at The Oval in April 1921. He took the wicket of Jack Hobbs (who apparently gave away his wicket) in the first innings and three more in the second.

This led to him being selected for the Surrey's match against Nottinghamshire at Trent Bridge in May at the recommendation of the Surrey captain Percy Fender. Surrey was dismissed for 76 and Notts reached 170 for 5 when Molony was introduced into bowling. The Cricketer reported that Molony "is a lob bowler who bowls leg theory and bowls it accurately, too. He varies the flight of the ball excellently and bowls an exceedingly good full-toss at awkward height". Bowling with eight men on the leg side, Molony went on to take three wickets for 11 runs in seven overs, Notts being all-out for 201. Cricketer recorded that "the attempts of the last few batsmen were ludicrous, which evinced much laughter from the crowd, which showed their unmistakable delight in seeing a lob bowler go on".

Molony took one wicket in his next match against Leicestershire, Albert Lord being caught by the Surrey wicket-keeper Bert Strudwick who "had to catch it or be almost decapitated". Possibly on the protest from Strudwick, he was then dropped from the side. Molony was given one more match against Warwickshire in June, but he took no more wickets. He was never again selected for Surrey or their Second XI.

He continued in Club cricket for many more years playing for Repton Pilgrims. During the war he was a Station Commander in the RAF.
