= Percy Herbert (cricketer) =

English cricketer

Personal information
- Full name: Percy Herbert
- Born: 12 August 1878; Shoreham-by-Sea, Sussex, England
- Died: 24 January 1958 (aged 79); Hove, Sussex, England
- Batting: Unknown
- Relatives: Percy Fender (nephew)

Career statistics
Competition	First-class
Matches	1
Runs scored	–
Batting average	–
100s/50s	–/–
Top score	–
Balls bowled	–
Wickets	–
Bowling average	–
5 wickets in innings	–
10 wickets in match	–
Best bowling	–
Catches/stumpings	–/–
- Source: Cricinfo, 18 May 2013

Percy Herbert (12 August 1878 – 24 January 1958) was an English cricketer. Herbert's batting style is unknown. He was born at Shoreham-by-Sea, Sussex.

The uncle of the future England Test cricketer Percy Fender, Herbert, a successful club cricketer, was given the chance to play first-class cricket by his nephew in a benefit match in aid of the pavilion attendant at The Oval. The match saw the Gentlemen of the South play the Players of the South, The Players of the South accumulated 551 for 9 by the end of the first day. The Gentlemen were short of players on the second day, having used substitute fielders on the first day, with Fender calling upon his uncle to make up the numbers. It rained on both the second and third days of the match, with no play possible, meaning Herbert has the rare distinction of having never taken to the field during his first-class career, having arrived at the ground on day two, he also never saw a ball bowled.

He died at Hove, Sussex on 24 January 1958.
