= Lucille Iremonger =

Jamaican writer and politician

Lucille d'Oyen Iremonger
- Born: June 1915
- Died: January 1989 (aged 73)
- Known for: Writer and politician
- Political party: Conservative Party

Lucille d'Oyen Iremonger, née Parks, (June 1915 – January 1989) was a Jamaican writer and politician, active in the United Kingdom.

Iremonger was born to Ivy Lucille (Joseph) Parks and Basil Oscar Parks (1882–1947) in Kingston, Jamaica. Both parents were born in Jamaica; her paternal grandparents, however, were from England and Scotland. Iremonger's father was managing director of the Jamaica Times, a literary paper edited by Thomas MacDermot (aka Tom Redcam, the first poet laureate of Jamaica).

Iremonger won a scholarship to St Hugh's College, a constituent college of Oxford, where she met Tom Iremonger. They married in 1939, and she moved with him to the then–British colonies of Gilbert and Ellice Islands and Fiji, before returning to Britain.

There she wrote her first book, It´s a Bigger Life, an account of the author's life in the Gilbert and Ellice Islands (1948). This was followed in short-suit by many other works, including the novels Creole (1951), The Cannibals (1952) short stories such as one collected in the Ernest Carr anthology Caribbean Anthology of Short Stories published in 1953 by Una Marson's Jamaica-based Pioneer Press, The Young Traveller in the West Indies (1955), a collection of Caribbean folktales for children (1956), the book The Ghosts of Versailles (1956) debunking her teachers' Moberly–Jourdain incident, The Young Traveller in the South Seas (1959), and the historical works Love and the Princesses (1960), And His Charming Lady (1961), Yes, My Darling Daughter (1964) and The Fiery Chariot (1970). The last was an influential book addressing the many British prime ministers who were illegitimate or orphaned as children. And His Charming Lady was a semi-autobiographical work about her position as the wife of a Member of Parliament. In 1978, she produced the third published biography of the 4th Earl of Aberdeen, British Prime Minister 1851-5.

At the 1961 London County Council election, Iremonger was elected to represent Norwood for the Conservative Party, serving until the council's abolition three years later.
