= Alfred Jeacocke =

English cricketer

Personal information
- Full name: Alfred Jeacocke
- Born: 1 December 1892; Islington, London, England
- Died: 26 September 1961 (aged 68); Ladywell, Lewisham, London, England
- Batting: Right-handed
- Bowling: Right arm off break
- Role: Batsman

Domestic team information
- Years: Team
- 1920–1934: Surrey
- 1930–1933: Marylebone Cricket Club

Career statistics
Competition	First-class
Matches	148
Runs scored	6,228
Batting average	28.83
100s/50s	8/29
Top score	201*
Balls bowled	884
Wickets	15
Bowling average	38.40
5 wickets in innings	0
10 wickets in match	0
Best bowling	3/24
Catches/stumpings	112/–
- Source: CricketArchive, 12 January 2013

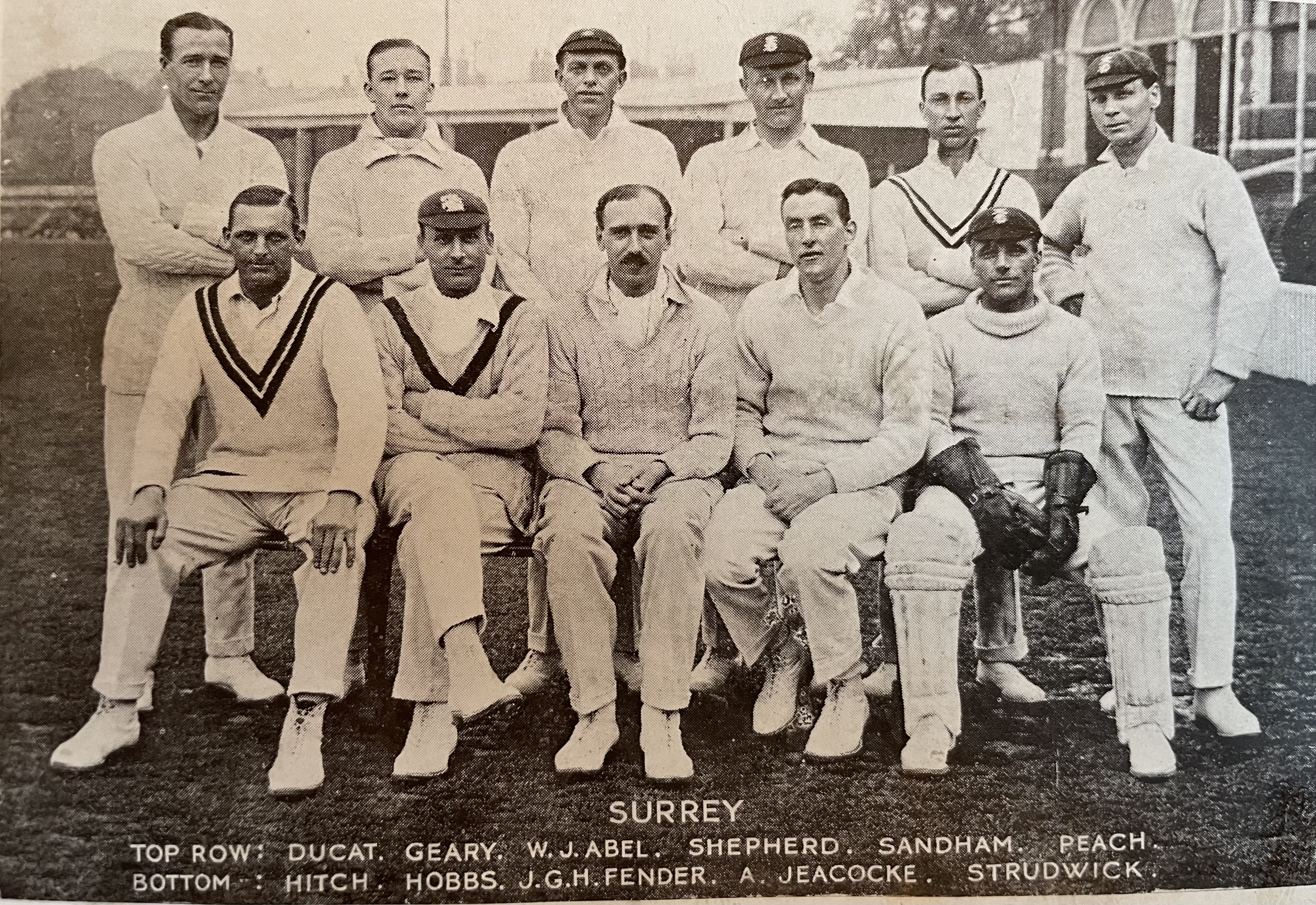
Surrey cricket team c1922

Alfred Jeacocke (1 December 1892 – 26 September 1961) was an English cricketer who played as an amateur for Surrey County Cricket Club from 1920 to 1934. An injury to Jack Hobbs gave him his chance to play regularly, and he scored over 1,000 runs in his first full season. His career was almost ended over a challenge to his qualification to play for Surrey in 1922. Outside of cricket, Jeacocke worked in the family business at Smithfield Market.

== Cricket career ==
Up until the 1920 cricket season, Jeacocke played club cricket in Surrey. After playing second team cricket, he made his first-class debut for Surrey on 29 May 1920. He played eight matches in total, averaging 26.00.

When Jack Hobbs was indisposed through illness and injury early in the 1921 season, Jeacocke was selected as an opening batsman for Surrey, in partnership with Andrew Sandham. He was very successful, scoring 1,056 runs at an average of 42.24 with three centuries. His average was among the best by amateur batsmen that season. Although never again passing 1,000 runs, he continued to play regularly for Surrey throughout the 1920s, and was selected six times to play in the prestigious Gentlemen v Players match. During his first-class career, Jeacocke worked in his family's business in Smithfield Market each day before cricket, rising to start work at 3am and continuing until play was due to start in any match in which he played. From 1929, Jeacocke appeared infrequently, but continued to play club cricket with great success. He mainly represented Forest Hill cricket club, continuing to appear in the team until the 1950s, and was president of the club at the time of his death in 1961.

== Controversies ==
During 1922, when he hit his highest first-class score of 201, Jeacocke was involved in a controversy over his registration to play for Surrey. He was born outside of the county of Surrey, but qualified to play for the team through having lived there long enough to be eligible. In August, Kent questioned his qualification on the grounds that he technically lived in Kent—his house was within the Kent boundary, although the other side of the road fell within Surrey. The situation arose through a housing shortage; when Jeacocke married in 1920, there were no suitable houses for him and his wife, so his father lent him a house rent-free. Jeacocke missed the remainder of the season, but Percy Fender, the county captain, defended him in the press and pointed out that the letter of the law meant that Jeacocke would have to re-qualify, making him ineligible until 1924. Kent were probably driven by Lord Harris, the influential treasurer of the MCC and chairman of Kent. During the same season, Harris had forced Gloucestershire to drop Wally Hammond from their team as he had not properly qualified for the team; he later defended Kent's actions in the press and equated any disagreement with Bolshevism. The Jeacocke episode generated much criticism of Lord Harris in the press, and the qualification rules were changed before the 1923 season so that a player was considered to be qualified for a county for the rest of his career once he had played three seasons with the club—as Jeacocke had.

In 1925, Jeacocke was involved in another incident, the details of which are vague. Surrey played Essex County Cricket Club at Leyton Cricket Ground. The rules for the time at which the lunch interval began had just been standardised, and Fender rejected a request from the Essex captain, Johnny Douglas, to keep the old time for the interval on the Leyton ground, preferring to "stick to MCC rules". This possibly aggravated what followed, and during this period Fender and Douglas had a difficult relationship. After two days' play, Surrey had scored 431 and Essex had replied with 333 for seven wickets. Before the third and final day, one of the umpires informed the captains that none of Surrey's professional players had arrived in time for the start of play. Douglas refused to postpone the start, stating "Strict MCC rules, Fender—the side refusing to play loses the match." Fender elected to continue, and when play began, only he and Jeacocke were present and these two went out to field alone. They had driven to the ground together, while the professionals were delayed in traffic. The Essex batsmen, possibly embarrassed by their captain's stance, did not appear until Fender sent a message saying that he could claim victory in the match if they did not come out to bat. They did so, and Fender and Jeacocke bowled from opposite ends until the remainder of the team arrived. The two men bowled wide and the batsmen made no attempt to score. Later in the day, the crowd jeered Fender for refusing to declare his innings closed, unaware of what had passed earlier. Whether the press were unaware of what happened, or if they agreed to keep it quiet, the incident was not reported, although several accounts hinted that something unusual had occurred. The play which took place was not recorded by the match scorers until the full Surrey team arrived, but several players who took part remembered it happening. In later years, rumours persisted that something like it had taken place.

== Style and technique ==
As a batsman, Jeacocke scored quickly, and was an effective driver of the ball. Many of his longer innings were scored at a great pace. His obituary in The Cricketer magazine described him as "a tall and stylish batsman and a superb driver". He was also a good slip fielder. In first-class cricket, he scored 6,228 runs at an average of 28.83 and took 14 wickets with off spin. Twice in his career, he shared partnerships of over 200 runs with Sandham.

== Bibliography ==
- Streeton, Richard (1981). P. G. H. Fender: A Biography. London: Faber & Faber. ISBN 0-571-11635-3.
