= Daily Citizen (British newspaper) =

The Daily Citizen was a short-lived early 20th century British newspaper from October 1912 to June 1915. It was an official organ of the nascent Labour Party and published in London with a simultaneous edition in Manchester. Tom Webster was brought from Birmingham to be the paper's political cartoonist, and a young Neville Cardus was briefly a music critic for the paper in 1913.
