= Norwood (London County Council constituency) =

London County Council constituency

- Former constituency for the London County Council

Former constituency
- Created: 1889
- Abolished: 1965
- Member(s): 2 (to 1949); 3 (from 1949)

Norwood was a constituency used for elections to the London County Council between 1889 and the council's abolition, in 1965. The seat shared boundaries with the UK Parliament constituency of the same name.

== Councillors ==
Year	Name	Party	Name	Party	Name	Party
1889	William Bennett Doubleday	Progressive	Nathaniel William Hubbard	Progressive	Two seats until 1949	
1895	Frederick Campbell	Moderate	James White	Moderate	Two seats until 1949	
1901	Nathaniel William Hubbard	Progressive	George Shrubsall	Progressive	Two seats until 1949	
1907	Cecil Urquhart Fisher	Municipal Reform	Forbes St John Morrow	Municipal Reform	Two seats until 1949	
1922	Rose Dunn-Gardner	Municipal Reform	William Francis Marchant	Municipal Reform	Two seats until 1949	
1931	Priscilla Worsthorne	Municipal Reform	William Francis Marchant	Municipal Reform	Two seats until 1949	
1934	Audrey Nona Gamble	Municipal Reform	William Francis Marchant	Municipal Reform	Two seats until 1949	
1937	Joan Vickers	Municipal Reform	William Francis Marchant	Municipal Reform	Two seats until 1949	
1946	Ronald Russell	Conservative	Margery Thornton	Conservative	Two seats until 1949	
1949	Ronald Russell	Conservative	Margery Thornton	Conservative	Aubrey Stapleton	Conservative
1955	Wilfrid Bateman	Conservative	Margery Thornton	Conservative	Percy Fender	Conservative
1958	Ellis Hillman	Labour	Robert William Humphreys	Labour	Nancy Silverman	Labour
1961	Lucille Iremonger	Conservative	William Wycliffe Livingston	Conservative	John Patten	Conservative

== Election results ==
1889 London County Council election: Norwood
Party	Candidate	Votes	%	±%
Progressive	William Bennett Doubleday	2,101		
Progressive	Nathaniel William Hubbard	1,525		
Moderate	Frederick Frampton Day	1,329		
Moderate	Horace W. Chatterton	1,326		
Moderate	Joseph Edmund Shepherd King	435		
Independent	Amos Cave	35		
Progressive win (new seat)				
Progressive win (new seat)				

1892 London County Council election: Norwood
Party	Candidate	Votes	%	±%
Progressive	William Bennett Doubleday	2,900		
Progressive	Nathaniel William Hubbard	2,895		
Moderate	Arthur Philip Quicke	2,681		
Moderate	W. J. Bonsor	2,666		
Progressive hold		Swing		
Progressive hold		Swing		

1895 London County Council election: Norwood
Party	Candidate	Votes	%	±%
Moderate	James White	3,245		
Moderate	Frederick Campbell	3,231		
Progressive	Nathaniel William Hubbard	2,753		
Progressive	F. W. Verney	2,692		
Moderate gain from Progressive		Swing		
Moderate gain from Progressive		Swing		

1898 London County Council election: Norwood
Party	Candidate	Votes	%	±%
Moderate	Frederick Campbell	3,373		
Moderate	James White	3,354		
Progressive	A. Allen	2,784		
Progressive	H. de R. Walker	2,781		
Moderate hold		Swing		

1901 London County Council election: Norwood
Party	Candidate	Votes	%	±%
Progressive	Nathaniel William Hubbard	3,770	29.5	+6.9
Progressive	George Shrubsall	3,626	28.4	+5.8
Conservative	Alfred Rice-Oxley	2,709	21.2	−6.2
Conservative	John Cutler	2,669	20.9	−6.4
Progressive gain from Conservative		Swing		
Progressive gain from Conservative		Swing	+6.3	

1904 London County Council election: Norwood
Party	Candidate	Votes	%	±%
Progressive	Nathaniel William Hubbard	4,328		
Progressive	George Shrubsall	4,233		
Conservative	E. E. Micholls	3,922		
Conservative	A. Chapman	3,887		
Majority				
Progressive hold		Swing		

1907 London County Council election: Norwood
Party	Candidate	Votes	%	±%
Municipal Reform	Cecil Urquhart Fisher	6,585		
Municipal Reform	Forbes St John Morrow	6,539		
Progressive	Nathaniel William Hubbard	4,174		
Progressive	George Shrubsall	4,120		
Majority				
Municipal Reform gain from Progressive		Swing		
Municipal Reform gain from Progressive		Swing		

1910 London County Council election: Norwood
Party	Candidate	Votes	%	±%
Municipal Reform	Cecil Urquhart Fisher	5,604		
Municipal Reform	Forbes St John Morrow	5,565		
Progressive	Nathaniel William Hubbard	3,698		
Progressive	Frederick Kellaway	3,552		
Majority				
Municipal Reform hold		Swing		

1913 London County Council election: Norwood
Party	Candidate	Votes	%	±%
Municipal Reform	Cecil Urquhart Fisher	6,047	31.5	+1.1
Municipal Reform	Forbes St John Morrow	6,006	31.3	+1.1
Progressive	Charles Tarring	3,559	18.6	−1.5
Progressive	A. E. Bennetts	3,553	18.5	−0.8
Majority		2,447	12.8	+2.7
Municipal Reform hold		Swing	+1.3	
Municipal Reform hold		Swing	+1.0	

1919 London County Council election: Norwood
Party	Candidate	Votes	%	±%
Municipal Reform	Cecil Urquhart Fisher	Unopposed	n/a	n/a
Municipal Reform	Forbes St John Morrow	Unopposed	n/a	n/a
Municipal Reform hold		Swing	n/a	
Municipal Reform hold		Swing	n/a	

1922 London County Council election: Norwood
Party	Candidate	Votes	%	±%
Municipal Reform	Rose Dunn Gardner	12,076	38.0	n/a
Municipal Reform	William Francis Marchant	12,044	37.9	n/a
Labour	Edgar Lansbury	3,895	12.2	n/a
Labour	Alfred Lugg	3,800	11.9	n/a
Majority		8,149	25.7	n/a
Municipal Reform hold		Swing	n/a	
Municipal Reform hold		Swing	n/a	

1925 London County Council election: Norwood
Party	Candidate	Votes	%	±%
Municipal Reform	Rose Dunn Gardner	8,178		
Municipal Reform	William Francis Marchant	8,050		
Labour	Edgar Lansbury	2,454		
Labour	H. A. Banks	2,407		
Majority				
Municipal Reform hold		Swing		
Municipal Reform hold		Swing		

1928 London County Council election: Norwood
Party	Candidate	Votes	%	±%
Municipal Reform	Rose Dunn Gardner	8,338		
Municipal Reform	William Francis Marchant	8,323		
Labour	H. A. Banks	2,806		
Labour	H. J. Bostock	2,749		
Majority				
Municipal Reform hold		Swing		
Municipal Reform hold		Swing		

1931 London County Council election: Norwood
Party	Candidate	Votes	%	±%
Municipal Reform	William Francis Marchant	7,772		
Municipal Reform	Priscilla Worsthorne	7,617		
Labour	Ann Anstey	2,244		
Labour	P. E. Thompson	2,196		
Majority				
Municipal Reform hold		Swing		
Municipal Reform hold		Swing		

1934 London County Council election: Norwood
Party	Candidate	Votes	%	±%
Municipal Reform	William Francis Marchant	8,148		
Municipal Reform	Audrey Nona Gamble	7,701		
Labour	W. Hunter	3,078		
Labour	Ruth Dalton	3,013		
Majority				
Municipal Reform hold		Swing		
Municipal Reform hold		Swing		

1937 London County Council election: Norwood
Party	Candidate	Votes	%	±%
Municipal Reform	William Francis Marchant	10,962		
Municipal Reform	Joan Vickers	10,664		
Labour	C. W. James	5,566		
Labour	G. Esher	5,538		
Majority				
Municipal Reform hold		Swing		
Municipal Reform hold		Swing		

1946 London County Council election: Norwood
Party	Candidate	Votes	%	±%
Conservative	Ronald Russell	7,938		
Conservative	Margery Thornton	7,854		
Labour	F. Matzen	6,655		
Labour	Bernard Bagnari	6,584		
Majority				
Conservative hold		Swing		
Conservative hold		Swing		

1949 London County Council election: Norwood
Party	Candidate	Votes	%	±%
Conservative	Aubrey Stapleton	16,794		
Conservative	Margery Thornton	16,369		
Conservative	Ronald Russell	16,195		
Labour	John Stonehouse	11,653		
Labour	F. E. Armond	10,927		
Labour	K. M. Shade	10,869		
Conservative win (new seat)				
Conservative hold		Swing		
Conservative hold		Swing		

1952 London County Council election: Norwood
Party	Candidate	Votes	%	±%
Conservative	Percy Fender	16,415		
Conservative	Margery Thornton	16,326		
Conservative	Wilfrid Bateman	16,268		
Labour	D. Finch	15,412		
Labour	M. J. Jenkins	15,244		
Labour	N. Whine	14,587		
Conservative hold		Swing		
Conservative hold		Swing		
Conservative hold		Swing		

1955 London County Council election: Norwood
Party	Candidate	Votes	%	±%
Conservative	Percy Fender	14,005		
Conservative	Margery Thornton	13,967		
Conservative	Wilfrid Bateman	13,757		
Labour	Charles Wegg-Prosser	8,801		
Labour	Fred Tonge	8,787		
Labour	Ena Daniels	8,761		
Liberal	G. D. Day	754		
Liberal	A. W. Wilson	607		
Liberal	R. J. B. Rappitt	531		
Conservative hold		Swing		
Conservative hold		Swing		
Conservative hold		Swing		

1958 London County Council election: Norwood
Party	Candidate	Votes	%	±%
Labour	Ellis Hillman	11,708		
Labour	Robert William Humphreys	11,579		
Labour	Nancy Silverman	11,578		
Conservative	William Wycliffe Livingston	10,834		
Conservative	Margery Thornton	10,561		
Conservative	Percy Fender	10,561		
Labour gain from Conservative		Swing		
Labour gain from Conservative		Swing		
Labour gain from Conservative		Swing		

1961 London County Council election: Norwood
Party	Candidate	Votes	%	±%
Conservative	William Wycliffe Livingston	13,390		
Conservative	Lucille Iremonger	13,182		
Conservative	John Patten	13,089		
Labour	F. B. Groves	9,819		
Labour	T. G. Boston	9,693		
Labour	Robert William Humphreys	9,685		
Liberal	Dennis Raymond Chapman	2,227		
Liberal	M. Deakin	2,112		
Liberal	D. D. Simons	1,417		
Conservative gain from Labour		Swing		
Conservative gain from Labour		Swing		
Conservative gain from Labour		Swing		
