= Richard Streeton =

English sports journalist

Richard Marsh Streeton (4 November 1930 – 30 June 2006) was an English sports journalist, concentrating on cricket.

Streeton's father was a manager for His Master's Voice and the BBC. Streeton was educated at King's School, Canterbury, before leading a distinguished naval career. He worked on provincial newspapers in Nuneaton, Mansfield, Nottingham, and Kettering, before joining Reuters in 1958.

He remained at Reuters for over a decade, where his assignments included the 1964 Summer Olympics in Tokyo and the 1968 Summer Olympics in Mexico City; England cricket tours to Australia, New Zealand, and the West Indies; and the Monte Carlo Rally.

He joined The Times in 1969, in London. He originally combined writing with sub-editing, but became a full-time writer from 1977. He wrote a biography of the cricketer Percy Fender in 1981, writing during a strike of print workers that closed The Times for almost a year. He became well known as a cricket and rugby correspondent, but also covered badminton, table tennis, and cycling. He went on several winter tours with the England cricket team. He left The Times in January 1993 and retired to Devon.

A resemblance to the actor Jack Hawkins caused him to be given the nickname "Hawkins".

== Bibliography ==
- PGH Fender: A Biography, Faber Books, 1981. ISBN 0-571-11635-3
