= Digby Jephson =

English cricketer

Digby Jepson
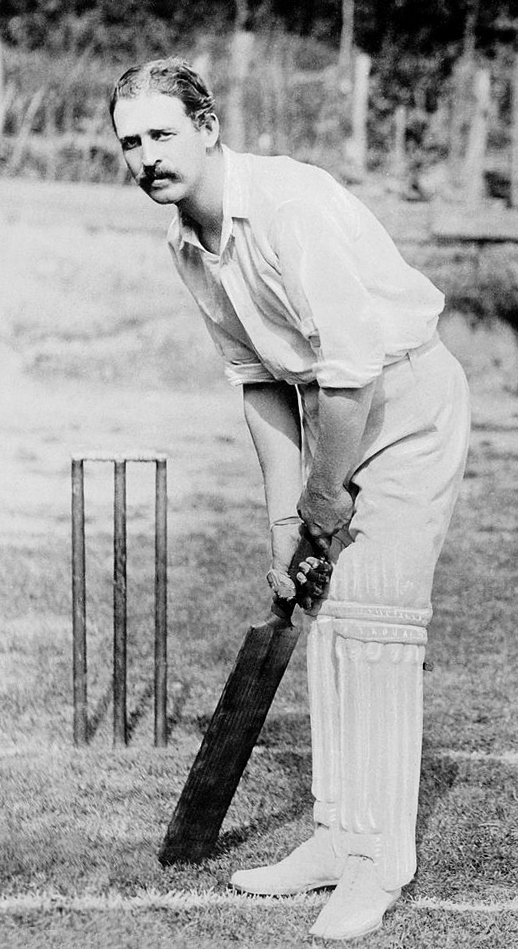
- Jephson in about 1902

Personal information
- Full name: Digby Loder Armroid Jephson
- Born: 23 February 1871; Brixton, London, England
- Died: 19 January 1926 (aged 54); Cambridge, England
- Batting: Right-handed
- Bowling: Right-arm fast

Domestic team information
- Years: Team
- 1890–1892: Cambridge University Cricket Club
- 1894–1904: Surrey County Cricket Club

Career statistics
Competition	First-class
Matches	207
Runs scored	7,973
Batting average	30.66
100s/50s	11/40
Top score	213
Balls bowled	14,263
Wickets	297
Bowling average	25.10
5 wickets in innings	14
10 wickets in match	2
Best bowling	7/51
Catches/stumpings	104/–
- Source: CricInfo, 23 April 2023

Digby Loder Armroid Jephson (23 February 1871 – 19 January 1926) was a cricketer who played for Cambridge University and Surrey. Jephson was a right-handed middle order batsman. But his enduring fame rests on his reputation as one of the last lob bowlers, bowling slow right-arm underarm lobs. His action was described as a little like setting a wood in crown green bowling. In fact, he started as an overarm right-handed fast bowler, but switched to lobs with great success when he took up regular county cricket in the late 1890s.

== Life ==
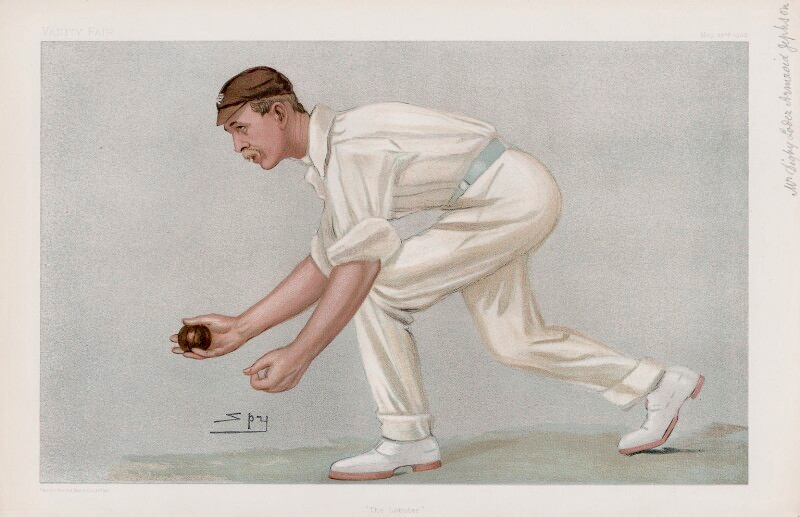
"The Lobster" Jephson as caricatured by Spy (Leslie Ward) in Vanity Fair, May 1902

Digby Jephson was the son of Cuthbert Armroid Jephson of Clapham. He was educated at Manor House School in Clapham and at Peterhouse, Cambridge. Despite fairly modest achievements, Jephson won his Blue at Cambridge for three years from 1890 to 1892, and he played for Surrey regularly in 1894, again without distinction. He barely played in 1895, and not at all in 1896, but from July 1897 he returned to regular county cricket with Surrey and appeared in most matches for the next 5 1/2 seasons. He scored more than 1,000 runs in the four seasons from 1898 to 1901, with a best of 1,952 runs, average 41.53, in 1900, when he appeared in 38 first-class matches.

His lob bowling seemed to get more effective with the passing years. In 1899 he took 6 for 21 in the Gentlemen v Players match at Lord's which the Gentlemen won by an innings. In 1900 he took 66 wickets and the following year he managed 77, including career best figures of seven for 51 against Gloucestershire at The Oval.

Jephson captained Surrey from 1900 to 1902, but stood down before the end of the 1902 season, and thereafter appeared only a few times in first-class cricket. Aside from his first-class career, he was also a prolific batsman in London club cricket, in particular for the touring side Wanderers.

He worked in the London Stock Exchange before becoming a journalist and a part-time cricket coach at Cambridge. He published A Few Overs, a book of 25 poems about cricket, with a foreword by C. B. Fry, in 1913.
