= Underarm bowling =

Cricket terminology

Underarm bowling is a style of bowling in cricket. The style is as old as the sport itself. Until the introduction of the roundarm style in the first half of the 19th century, bowling was performed in the same way as in the sport of bowls, with the ball being delivered with the hand below the waist. Bowls may well be an older game than cricket and it is possible that it provided a template for delivering a ball with a degree of accuracy.

== History ==
For centuries, bowling in cricket was performed exactly as in the sport of bowls because the ball was rolled or skimmed along the ground. The bowlers may have used variations in pace but the basic action was essentially the same. There are surviving illustrations from the first half of the eighteenth century which depict the bowler with one knee bent forward and his bowling hand close to the ground, while the ball trundles (if slow) or skims (if quick) towards a batsman armed with a bat shaped something like a large hockey stick and guarding a two-stump wicket.

Cricket's first great bowling revolution occurred probably in the 1760s when bowlers started to pitch the ball instead of rolling it along the ground. The change was evolutionary and has been described as the event that took cricket out of its "pioneering phase" into what may be termed its "pre-modern phase" (i.e., which ended when overarm bowling ushered in the modern game in 1864) and effectively created a different code of cricket, just as there are now two different codes of rugby football.

The pitched delivery was well established by 1772 when detailed scorecards became commonplace and the straight bat had already replaced the curved one by that time. There is no doubt that the straight bat was invented to contest the pitched delivery. It has been said that the inventor was John Small of Hambledon but it is unlikely that he actually invented it; rather, he was the first great batsman to master its use.

The 1760s are one of cricket's "Dark Ages"; a good deal more is known about the decades 1731–1750 than of 1751–1770. This has largely to do with the impact of the Seven Years' War of 1756–1763 which not only claimed the sport's manpower but also its patronage. Pitching may have begun during that period, but little is known about it for it seems to have been introduced and widely accepted without the huge controversies that surrounded the later implementations of roundarm and overarm.

The first known codification of the Laws of Cricket, created by the London Cricket Club in 1744, makes no mention of prescribed bowling action and does not say the ball must be delivered at ground level, which suggests a pitched delivery would not be illegal. The rules for bowlers in the 1744 Laws focus on the position of the hind foot during delivery (i.e., it had to be behind the bowling crease) and overstepping is the only specified cause for calling a no-ball. The umpires were granted "discretion" and so presumably would call no-ball if, say, a ball was thrown by the bowler.

One of the first great bowlers to employ the pitched delivery to good effect was Edward "Lumpy" Stevens of Chertsey and Surrey. There is a surviving rhyme about him to the effect that "honest Lumpy did allow he ne'er would pitch but o'er a brow". In those days, the leading bowler on each team had choice of precisely where the wickets would be placed, and Lumpy was adept at finding a spot where the turf was uneven on a good length, so that he could use his repertoire of shooters, twisters, and risers. Lumpy was a true professional who studied the arts and crafts of the game to seek continuous improvement as a bowler. He is known to have observed the flight of the ball and experimented for long hours with variations of line, length and speed of delivery until he had mastered the art of pitching.

Other great bowlers of the late 18th century were Thomas Brett and David Harris, both of the Hambledon club. They were fast bowlers whereas Lumpy relied on variety of pace. A notable bowler of the time was Lamborn who spun the ball in an unorthodox fashion and may have been the first unorthodox spinner.

Underarm bowling was effective while pitch conditions were difficult for batsmen due to being uneven and uncovered. In time, especially after the opening of Lord's and the development of groundsmanship, pitches began to improve and batsmen were able to play longer innings than previously. In the 1780s and 1790s, one of the best batsmen around was Tom Walker, who was also a very useful slow bowler. Walker was another improviser like Lumpy and he began to experiment by bowling with his hand away from his body. It is not clear how high he raised his hand but it could have been waist height. He was accused of "jerking" the ball and so delivering it in an unfair and improper manner. He was censured for his trouble and was forced to return to his normal underarm lobs, but he had sown the seeds of bowling's next revolution.

This was roundarm, so called because the hand is held out from the body (i.e., between waist and shoulder height) at the point of delivery. The roundarm style was promoted successively by John Willes, William Lillywhite and Jem Broadbridge until it was finally legalised, amid furious controversy, in 1835 with an amendment to the rule in 1845.

Roundarm did not mean the end of underarm, which continued well into the overarm era that began in 1864. William Clarke, founder of the All England Eleven in 1845, remained a highly effective underarm bowler long after roundarm began. Others who sometimes bowled underarm into the overarm era were James Grundy and James Southerton.

By the beginning of the twentieth century, underarm had more or less disappeared and was rarely seen thereafter, although exceptions did occur. There were cases where a bowler had been injured and so completed his over with underarms. In more controversial circumstances, there were instances of bowlers who had been no-balled for throwing who decided to bowl underarm to get through the over.

George Simpson-Hayward was an England hero of the 1909–10 series in South Africa with his underarm bowling. Reference books often refer to him as the "last great lob bowler", but other descriptions suggest he was a ferocious under-arm spinner of the ball, getting immense turn off the pitch through a fairly low trajectory, rather than being a true "lobster".

== Lob bowling ==
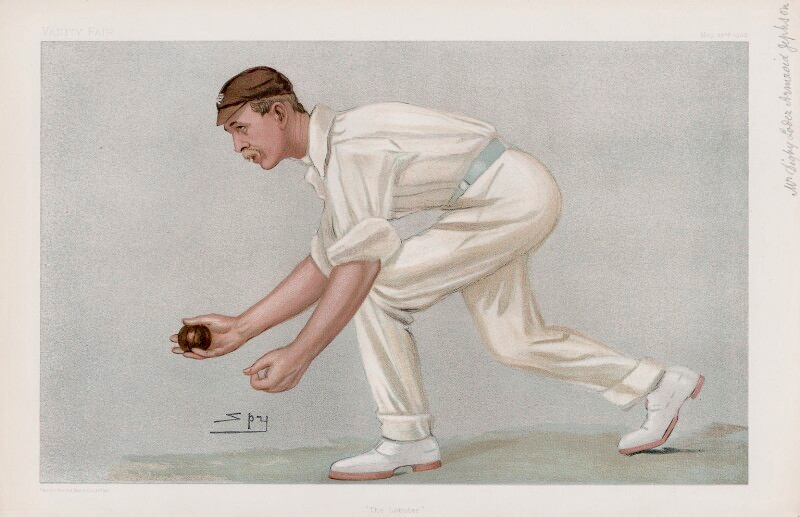
"The Lobster" Jephson as caricatured by Spy in Vanity Fair, May 1902

In cricket, lob bowling is a largely disused style of bowling. It has become illegal under Law 21.1.2 to use underarm bowling without prior agreement before the match, an amendment to the laws of cricket that was made following the notorious incident in the 1980–81 World Series match.

It was used in the game in the 19th century, where trajectory was the most important consideration. Lob bowlers, both right and left-handed, sometimes attempted 'donkey drops', attempting to pitch the ball on the stumps from as great a height as possible, preferably with the ball descending behind the batsman standing at the crease.

The last regular bowler of lobs in international cricket was George Simpson-Hayward, in the period before the First World War. He bowled with a much lower trajectory than most earlier lob bowlers, imparting great spin to the ball with constant variation of pace as well.

Others famous "lobsters" include Digby Jephson. As an underarm bowler he had an action a little like setting a wood in crown green bowling.

The last specialist lob bowler to play cricket in England was Trevor Molony who made three appearances in the County Championship for Surrey in 1921, by which time the style was already essentially defunct.

Charles Palmer (1919–2005), who played for Worcestershire and Leicestershire, sometimes used donkey-drops to good effect.

Sir Arthur Conan Doyle wrote a story about a similar style of bowling called The Story of Spedegue's Dropper.

Today Law 41.7.1 forbids the bowling of "beamers", which renders the ball an illegal no-ball if it passes above the batter's waist height on the full. Any bowler doing so by intent would now be further sanctioned for bowling a deliberate beamer (which is considered both dangerous and unfair even at slow speed), but there is nothing to stop the ball from being lobbed, as long as it pitches short enough to pass the popping crease below waist height, and such a ball would still pose a challenge to the batter.

Lob bowling is still sometimes found in low-level village cricket; these deliveries are known as donkey-drops. More usually these are over-arm deliveries; but round-arm is also possible and would more closely approximate a traditional lob.

== In modern cricket ==
Underarm bowling became virtually extinct after the First World War. Trevor Molony, who represented Surrey in three matches in 1921, was probably the last specialist lob-bowler. However, Gerald Brodribb in his book on this subject lists about twenty-five instances since that time when underarm lob bowling was employed as an occasional tactic. The list of bowlers who have tried this includes George Brown (who played first-class cricket between 1908 and 1932), Fred Root (first-class career from 1910 to 1932), Bhupinder Singh, the Maharaja of Patiala (played between 1911 and 1937), Hedley Verity (played 1930–39), Wilf Wooller (1930–1962), Jack Iverson (1948–51) and most recently Mike Brearley (who played first-class cricket between 1961 and 1981).

Bowlers have employed underarm bowling for several reasons. When the Trinidadian cricketer Syed Mubarak Ali was no-balled 30 times for throwing in a match against Barbados in 1942, he resorted to simply rolling the ball along the ground to avoid more no-balls. In similar circumstances, South African bowler Geoff Griffin did the same in an exhibition match that followed the Test against England at Lord's in 1960, where he had already been no-balled. As rain threatened to end the match between Victoria and Marylebone Cricket Club (MCC) in 1928–29, the MCC bowler Fred Barratt rolled the ball along the ground to allow Bill Woodfull to score a four to complete his hundred and Victoria to win.

But some of the modern instances of underarm deliveries occurred when bowlers did it in frustration to register some form of protest; when Lancashire batted on for too long against Oxford University at Oxford in 1990, Phil Gerrans, an Australian playing for Oxford, bowled a ball underarm. Since he had not informed the umpire of the change of action, he was no-balled. This appears to be the most recent recorded instance of underarm bowling.

=== Definition ===
Technically speaking, an underarm delivery is one in which the bowler's hand does not rise above the level of the waist. The Laws of Cricket now (2000 Code) declare that an underarm delivery is illegal unless otherwise agreed before the match. A delivery is a no-ball if it bounces more than twice before passing the popping crease: an underarm delivery cannot be performed rolling along the ground. A pitched underarm delivery is a good ball, providing it only pitches once, and providing the opposing captain has agreed beforehand that the style may be used. It is unlikely that any bowler would reintroduce the style, given modern pitch conditions.

=== 1981 incident ===
A highly controversial incident occurred in the final of the Benson & Hedges World Series Cup at the MCG in 1981 when Australian bowler Trevor Chappell, under orders from his captain and brother Greg Chappell, rolled the final ball along the ground to batsman Brian McKechnie to avoid the possibility of it being hit for the six runs that New Zealand needed to tie the match.

== In informal cricket ==
Underarm bowling still plays a role in informal garden cricket games, which are often played by less athletic people or young children. Novices at playing the game often find it awkward or difficult to bowl overarm or roundarm either effectively or accurately, so can be allowed to bowl underarm by general consensus. Since underarm bowling is also slower than overarm or roundarm, it is easier for novice batsmen to hit the ball, making it ideal for informal and children's cricket.
