= Tom Webster (cartoonist) =

English cartoonist and caricaturist

Gilbert Thomas Webster (1886–1962) was an English cartoonist and caricaturist.

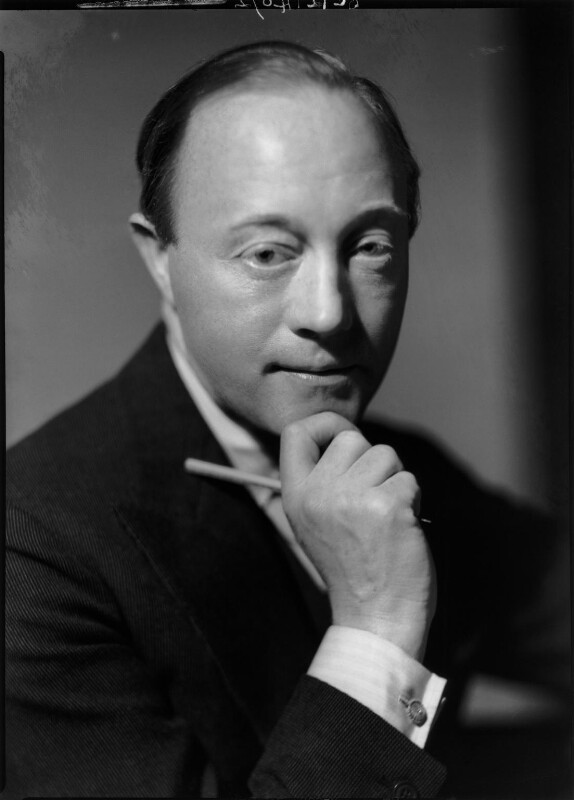
Tom Webster by Howard Coster in The National Portrait Gallery London

== Biography ==
Born in Church Street, Bilston, Staffordshire (now West Midlands), Webster was the son of Daniel Webster, ironmonger, and his wife Sarah Ann (née Bostock) a tobacconist. However, his father died before Tom was five years old. He was educated at the Royal Wolverhampton School, and at the age of fourteen got his first job as a railway booking-clerk. He taught himself to draw, and in 1904 he won a newspaper cartoon contest. This began his career in cartooning. He started out at the Sports Argus in Birmingham, moving to London in 1912 to become the political cartoonist for the short-lived Labour Party mouthpiece, the Daily Citizen. This was an ironic placement, given his later Conservative-inclined stance.

In November 1915, Webster volunteered for the army, giving his occupation as "Bank clerk". He was sent to France in May 1916 as a Lance Corporal and saw action in the Battle of the Somme. He was wounded in the neck at St. Eloi in November 1916 and invalided home soon afterwards. Webster spent six months in hospital before being discharged in July 1917.

Eventually, in 1918, Webster secured a job with the Evening News, before joining the Daily Mail in 1919. He specialised in cartoons of horseracing, cricket and golf, and stayed at the Mail for over twenty years, enjoying enormous popularity. As early as 1924 he was reputedly the highest-paid cartoonist in the world.

In his capacity as a sports cartoonist, he became friends and golf partner with Arsenal manager Herbert Chapman, and one account says it was a combination of clothing worn by Webster that inspired Chapman to add white sleeves to Arsenal's red shirts.

Webster also continued caricaturising politicians, generally with an anti-Labour tone; notably, on the night of the 1929 general election, a selection of his cartoons was projected in public in London's Trafalgar Square.

The same year, in New York City, Webster married Mae Flynn, a former member of the Ziegfeld Follies, and their wedding was covered by the newsreels. They had their honeymoon in Hollywood, where Webster drew Charlie Chaplin, whom he had known earlier in England. The marriage was childless and Webster was divorced in 1933.

In December 1935, he married Ida Michael, an American showgirl who had starred on Broadway and in the Dorchester Cabaret in London.

He left the Daily Mail in 1940, and later, during the war, he performed in concert parties in France and Belgium, as a cartoonist and comedian, as well as doing some work as a war correspondent. He continued to draw for other newspapers, and his own range of annuals, until 1960.

Tom Webster died at his home in London on 21 June 1962 aged 76. He was survived by his second wife, two daughters, and a son.
