= Somerset County Cricket Club in 1890 =

Somerset County Cricket Club
1890 season
- Captain: Herbie Hewett
- 'Second-class County Championship': Champions
- Most runs: Herbie Hewett (543)

The 1890 season saw Somerset County Cricket Club playing thirteen fixtures against other county teams. These matches were not considered first-class, after Somerset had five years earlier been removed from the County Championship due to playing too few matches against other first-class counties. In the summer of 1890, Somerset scheduled thirteen fixtures, winning twelve of them and tying one against Middlesex. As a result of this, they were readmitted to the County Championship for the following 1891 season.

== Squad ==
Players with international caps are listed in bold.

Name	Nat	Birth date (Note: Age refers to player's age at the start of the season (27 May 1890).)	Batting Style	Bowling Style	Notes
Batsmen
Herbie Hewett	(England)	25 May 1864 (aged 26)	Left-handed	Unknown arm medium pace	Club captain
John Challen	(England)	26 March 1863 (aged 27)	Right-handed	Right arm fast-medium	
Albert Clapp	(England)	3 May 1867 (aged 23)	Right-handed	Right arm medium pace	
Eustace Hill	(England)	13 April 1869 (aged 21)	Right-handed	–	
Stephen Newton	(England)	21 April 1853 (aged 37)	Right-handed	–	
**Lionel Palairet**	(England)	27 May 1870 (aged 20)	Right-handed	Right arm medium pace / slow (underarm)	Two Test appearances for England in 1902.
Richard Palairet	(England)	25 June 1871 (aged 18)	Right-handed	–	
Crescens Robinson	(England)	21 May 1864 (aged 26)	Right-handed	–	
Bill Roe	(England)	21 March 1861 (aged 29)	Right-handed	Right arm off break / medium pace	
John Trask	(England)	27 October 1861 (aged 28)	Right-handed	Right-arm medium pace	
Lower-order Batsmen
Joseph Gibbs	(England)	25 November 1867 (aged 22)	Right-handed	–	
Vernon Hill	(England)	30 January 1871 (aged 19)	Left-handed	Right arm fast-medium	
Edward Lock	(England)	21 November 1868 (aged 21)	Unknown	–	
Henry Murray-Anderdon	(England)	8 December 1848 (aged 41)	Unknown	–	Honorary club secretary
S Spencer	(England)	Unknown	Unknown-handed	–	
Thomas Spencer	(England)	10 June 1850 (aged 39)	Unknown-handed	–	Assistant secretary
Clement Stock	(England)	21 March 1867 (aged 23)	Unknown-handed	–	
Edward Whitting	(England)	1 September 1872 (aged 17)	Right-handed	Right arm fast	
Wilfrid Young	(England)	5 October 1867 (aged 22)	Right-handed	Right arm slow	
All-rounders
Gerald Fowler	(England)	27 July 1866 (aged 23)	Right-handed	Right arm fast-medium	
Walter Hedley	(England)	12 December 1865 (aged 24)	Right-handed	Right arm fast-medium	
George Nichols	(England)	14 June 1862 (aged 27)	Right-handed	Right arm fast-medium	
**Ted Tyler**	(England)	13 October 1864 (aged 25)	Left-handed	Slow left-arm orthodox	One Test appearance for England in 1896.
**Sammy Woods**	(Australia) / (England)	13 April 1867 (aged 23)	Right-handed	Right arm fast-medium	Three Test appearances for Australia and three for England.
Wicket-keepers
Leonard Compton	(England)	17 August 1864 (aged 25)	Unknown-handed	–	
Edward Ebdon	(England)	22 April 1870 (aged 20)	Right-handed	–	
Arthur Newton	(England)	12 September 1862 (aged 27)	Right-handed	–	
Hamilton Ross	(England)	26 August 1849 (aged 40)	Right-handed	–	
Bowlers
Charles Winter	(England)	9 October 1866 (aged 23)	Unknown-handed	Right arm fast	

== Matches ==
26–27 May 1890
Scorecard

Somerset	v	Middlesex
133 (39.4 overs); Coote Hedley 36; Jim Phillips 7/48		132 (55 overs); PJT Henery 42; Ted Tyler 5/62
208 (58.3 overs); Herbie Hewett 65; G Burton 5/80		131 (41.4 overs); Tim O'Brien 44; George Nichols 5/55

Somerset won by 78 runs
Lord's Cricket Ground, London
Umpires: RP Carpenter and CK Pullin

26–28 June 1890 (Note: Number of overs and full bowling statistics not recorded, only number of wickets.)
Scorecard

Somerset	v	Hampshire
127; Ted Tyler 35; William Roberts 7/?		94; Teddy Wynyard 22; George Nichols 8/?
99; Ted Tyler 39*; Thomas Soar 4/?		130; Russell Bencraft 52; Ted Tyler 5/?

Somerset won by 2 runs
County Ground, Southampton
Umpires: Unknown

14–15 July 1890
Scorecard

Somerset	v	Leicestershire
415 (125.0 overs); Lionel Palairet 158; Dick Pougher 6/161		61 (39.2 overs); Dick Pougher 16; George Nichols 6/23
		197 (f/o) (83.0 overs); Dick Pougher 44; Ted Tyler 5/85

Somerset won by an innings and 157 runs
County Ground, Taunton
Umpires: Unknown

18–19 July 1890
Scorecard

Staffordshire	v	Somerset
36 (37.1 overs); Henry Briscoe 10*; George Nichols 4/14		266/9d (95.4 overs); John Trask 63; Charles Vale 3/86
81 (67.3 overs); Arthur Heath 36*; George Nichols 6/54

Somerset won by an innings and 149 runs
County Ground, Stoke-on-Trent
Umpires: H James and W Turner

21–22 July 1890
Scorecard

Somerset	v	Warwickshire
149; George Nichols 50; Henry Pallett 4/?, Joseph Cresswell 4/?		144; Herbert Bainbridge 37; Ted Tyler 7/?
212; George Nichols 67; Henry Pallett 4/?, John Shilton 4/?		96; John Hill 25*; Ted Tyler 6/?

Somerset won by 121 runs
Edgbaston, Birmingham
Umpires: Unknown

25–26 July 1890
Scorecard

Somerset	v	Glamorgan
300 (102.3 overs); George Nichols 49; Theo Robinson 3/71		84 (48.0 overs); Bill Gwynn 24; Ted Tyler 7/37
		140 (f/o) (75.4 overs); William Williams 37; Ted Tyler 7/61

Somerset won by an innings and 76 runs
Cardiff Arms Park, Cardiff
Umpires: JHG Devey and R Humphrey

4–5 August 1890
Scorecard

Somerset	v	Leicestershire
296 (120.3 overs); George Nichols 110; Samuel Wright 3/45		130 (61.1 overs); Samuel Wright 32; Sammy Woods 7/76
5 (2.0 overs); Coote Hedley 4*		170 (f/o) (44.3 overs); John Turnerr 61; Ted Tyler 3/51

Somerset won by 10 wickets
Grace Road, Leicester
Umpires: Unknown

11–12 August 1890
Scorecard

Staffordshire	v	Somerset
43 (46.1 overs); Francis Marlow 22; Ted Tyler 6/21		338/7d (78.0 overs); Herbie Hewett 203*; William Calkin 2/84
124 (66.1 overs); John Brown 43; George Nichols 4/34

Somerset won by an innings and 171 runs
County Ground, Taunton
Umpires: FH Farrands and T Mycroft

14–15 August 1890
Scorecard

Somerset	v	Hampshire
140; Lionel Palairet 44; Ledger Hill 4/?		97; Harry Baldwin 31; Ted Tyler 6/?
179; WN Roe 48; Harry Baldwin 4/?, William Roberts 4/?		54; Teddy Wynyard 33; George Nichols 7/?

Somerset won by 168 runs
County Ground, Taunton
Umpires: Unknown

18–19 August 1890
Scorecard

Somerset	v	Warwickshire
211; Bill Roe 42; Joseph Cresswell 8/45		27; John Hill 6 Ted Tyler 5/?
		97 (f/o); Ludford Docker 26; Ted Tyler 6/?

Somerset won by an innings and 87 runs
County Ground, Taunton
Umpires: Unknown

21–22 August 1890
Scorecard

Somerset	v	Middlesex
107 (73.2 overs); John Challen 49; Jack Hearne 8/55		108 (43.2 overs); Alexander Webbe 43; Ted Tyler 5/64
127 (75.1 overs); Herbie Hewett 34; Jack Hearne 3/44		126 (57.4 overs); Alexander Webbe 57; Sammy Woods 5/61

Match tied
County Ground, Taunton
Umpires: A Hill and CK Pullin

27–28 August 1890
Scorecard

Devon	v	Somerset
172 (92.1 overs); John Copleston 45; Ted Tyler 6/76 (47.1 overs)		159 (50 overs); Bill Roe 32; Montagu Toller 6/71 (24 overs)
46 (61.2 overs); BL Gerrish 12; Ted Tyler 7/16 (31 overs)		60/4 (12.1 overs); John Challen 15; Byron Drury 3/31 (6 overs)

Somerset won by 6 wickets
County Ground, Taunton
Umpires: W Hearn and T Mycroft

29–30 August 1890
Scorecard

Glamorgan	v	Somerset
27 (35.2 overs); Willie Llewelyn 8 Ted Tyler 6/17		245 (79.1 overs); WN Roe 82; William Morgan 6/62
115 (41.2 overs); Robert Lewis 52; Ted Tyler 5/49

Somerset won by an innings and 103 runs
Lansdown Cricket Club Ground, Bath
Umpires: W Hearne and T Mycroft

== Batting averages ==
Player	Matches	Innings	Runs	Average	100s	50s
Herbie Hewett	10	15	543	38.79	1	2
Lionel Palairet	10	14	408	29.14	1	1
Bill Roe	8	12	316	28.73	0	1
George Nichols	13	18	497	27.61	1	3
John Challen	9	14	286	20.43	0	1
Ted Tyler	13	18	297	18.56	0	0
Crescens Robinson	9	13	162	14.73	0	0
Albert Clapp	11	15	159	10.60	0	0
Qualification: 150 runs. Source: CricketArchive (Note: Statistics collated from match scorecards.)

== Bibliography ==
- Foot, David. Sunshine, Sixes and Cider: The History of Somerset Cricket (1986 ed.). David & Charles. ISBN 0-7153-8890-8.
