= Joseph Gibbs (cricketer) =

English cricketer

Joseph Arthur Gibbs
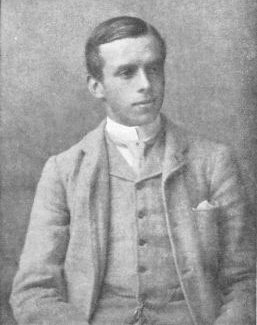

Personal information
- Full name: Joseph Arthur Gibbs
- Born: 25 November 1867; London, England
- Died: 13 May 1899 (aged 31); London, England
- Batting: Right-handed
- Role: Batsman

Domestic team information
- Years: Team
- 1890–1894: Somerset
- 1894–1896: Marylebone Cricket Club
- First-class debut: 9 July 1891 Somerset v Lancashire
- Last First-class: 4 June 1896 Marylebone Cricket Club (MCC) v Oxford University

Career statistics
Competition	First-class
Matches	10
Runs scored	162
Batting average	9.52
100s/50s	0/1
Top score	75
Catches/stumpings	5/–
- Source: CricketArchive, 9 January 2010

Joseph Arthur Gibbs (25 November 1867 – 13 May 1899) was an English cricketer who made ten first-class appearances between 1891 and 1896. He played five first-class matches for Somerset, and also appeared for the Marylebone Cricket Club (MCC) and I Zingari. He also published a number of books, including A Cotswold Village; or, country life and pursuits in Gloucestershire and The Improvement of Cricket Grounds on economical principles.

== Life and career ==
Gibbs was educated at Eton College, and then Christ Church, Oxford. He spent two years with the family banking firm in London before moving to Ablington, near Cirencester in 1892, where he lived as the squire of a small estate at Ablington Manor. He died of sudden heart failure in 1899, aged only 31.

== Cricket career ==
While at Oxford, Gibbs played in a one-day, single innings match against Eton College, opening the batting and scoring 10 runs, and then claiming two wickets as Eton beat them by seven wickets. The next summer he played two matches for Somerset, during their successful 1890 season. During these matches, he averaged 25 while batting in the lower order. His first-class debut came in the following season, after Somerset's readmission to the first-class game. Playing against Lancashire at the County Ground, Taunton, Gibbs made six in both innings during a nine wicket defeat. That was his only first-class appearance of the season, his next coming eleven months later, playing for H Hewett's XII against Cambridge University. He followed this up with two matches for I Zingari in Ireland, and a further two for the Marylebone Cricket Club (MCC) at Lord's.

During the English winter of 1892–93, Gibbs travelled to Ceylon and India as part of Lord Hawke's tour. Gibbs' top-score on the tour was 14, and although he bowled, he failed to take any wickets. During his only first-class match of the tour, against Bombay, Gibbs caught his Somerset team-mate John Trask in Bombay's second innings. Gibbs made his highest score in first-class cricket, 75 against Oxford University for Somerset only a week after making a pair for the MCC. The last of his five first-class appearances for Somerset was in June 1894, in which he scored seven runs in his only innings of the match. His highest recorded score came two years later, playing in a one-day, single-innings match for the MCC against Dulwich. Opening the batting, Gibbs made 178 of the MCC's 358 runs, as they won by seven wickets.

In his work, A Cotswold Village, Gibbs describes county cricket as being "a little over done", believing the time demands of the game, playing two three-day matches each week through the summer, too great. He thinks that an amateur who has received a good education, composed of public-school followed by university is wasting this education if they then send the majority of the week playing cricket each year. Despite this belief, he is in favour of some amateurs remaining in the game, to "prevent the further development of professionalism." Gibbs hypothesises that the "abnormal extent" of the development of cricket was due to the peaceful times that he lived in, but that in times of war, Englishmen would be glad of the useful lessons in courage and coolness that sport taught them.
