= Thomas Spencer (cricketer) =

English cricketer

Thomas Spencer (10 June 1850 – 28 November 1933) played first-class cricket for Somerset in three matches between 1891 and 1893. His birthplace is not known, and he died at Bishopsteignton, Devon.

Spencer's batting and bowling styles are not known and in his three first-class matches, one in 1891 and two in 1893, and all played when he was more than 40 years old, he batted as a tail-ender and did not bowl. His highest first-class score was 14, made in his first match, against Yorkshire, for whom George Hirst was also making his debut. Spencer had, however, played as a middle-order batsman and as an occasional bowler in other matches for Somerset during the period up to 1891 when the team's matches were not deemed first-class.

Spencer's role within Somerset County Cricket Club was wider than just as a player: a history of the club indicates that at the time of the restoration of Somerset to first-class status, Spencer was helping the club secretary, H. E. Murray-Anderdon, with the administration duties, a task he handed over when Sammy Woods was recruited as an "amateur" player in need of financial assistance in 1893. Another history refers to him as the "diffident and effective joint secretary" alongside Murray-Anderdon. As a Somerset official, he attended the meeting of the County Cricket Council in December 1890 with Somerset captain Herbie Hewett at which the council unexpectedly voted to abolish itself, opening the way for the first-class counties to increase their number by arranging fixtures between themselves, with Somerset as the first beneficiary of this loosening of the rules.
