= Edward Whitting =

English cricketer

Personal information
- Full name: Edward Jewel Whitting
- Born: 1 September 1872; Mylor, Cornwall, England
- Died: 8 March 1938 (aged 65); Abergavenny, Monmouthshire, Wales
- Batting: Right-handed
- Bowling: Right-arm fast

Domestic team information
- Years: Team
- 1890: Somerset
- Only First-class: 13 June 1892 HT Hewett's XII v Cambridge University

Career statistics
Competition	First-class
Matches	1
Runs scored	6
Batting average	6.00
100s/50s	0/0
Top score	5
Catches/stumpings	0/–
- Source: CricketArchive, 27 October 2010

Edward Jewel Whitting (1 September 1872 – 8 March 1938) was an English cricketer who made one first-class appearance in 1892. He was a right-handed batsman and a right-arm fast bowler, although he did not bowl in first-class cricket.

== Cricket career ==
Whitting attended Rugby School, and among his appearances for the school's cricket team, he top-scored in both innings for the school in an 1889 match against Marlborough College, making 15 and 51 respectively. He captained the side in the same fixture the following season, and claimed two wickets in Marlborough's first-innings, before scoring a half-century in Rugby's second-innings. During 1890, he played his first and solitary match for Somerset, appearing for the side in a second-class match against Leicestershire. Whitting scored a duck in his only innings. Somerset won the match by ten wickets, and remained unbeaten for the rest of the season, gaining admission to the County Championship for the following season. He remained as captain of the Rugby School first eleven in 1891 and his performance stood out during a single-innings match against Trinity College, Oxford in which he top-scored for Rugby with 46, and claimed three wickets.

He made his only first-class appearance in 1892. Somerset were due to play Cambridge University, but the match was played as a twelve-a-side contest in which Norman Cooper of Cambridge University represented the Somerset side. Due to this, the Somerset side was entitled 'HT Hewett's XII', with HT Hewett being Somerset's captain at the time. Whitting scored one run in the first-innings and remained not out, and added another five runs in the second-innings. The Somerset side won by 194 runs. He appeared on six occasions for the Marylebone Cricket Club in 1893 and 1894, none of which were considered first-class fixtures. In each of the two years, he played against Herefordshire, Monmouthshire and Glamorgan. His highest score in these matches was 71, which he made against Herefordshire in 1893.
