= Frances Fry =

English wildlife artist

- Born: Frances Fry
- Known for: Illustration
- Movement: Watercolour, wildlife

Frances Fry was an English wildlife artist and illustrator, known for her work published as greetings cards (Medici Society) and calendars. She also wrote and illustrated The Colour Guide to British Birds and Their Eggs (Nimrod Press, 1990), and provided illustrations for Cyril Roger's The World of Zebra Finches (Nimrod Press, 1986), Watmough's The Cult of the Budgerigar (Triplegate, 1983), Frank Finn's Fancy Waterfoul (Nimrod Press, 1985). Additionally she wrote various articles on nature and animals as well as the "Country Diary" column for The West Somerset Gazette.

Fry lived in the West Country and was fond of walking the countryside of Exmoor, which provided inspiration for her paintings. An animal lover and conservationist, she had a wildlife-orientated garden. She listed gardening as one of her hobbies, together with bird- and animal-watching, photography and listening to classical music.

== Career ==
Produced the book - A Colour Guide to British Birds and their Eggs - Published by Nimrod Press.

Produced a regular column in the Somerset County Gazette entitled "Frances Fry's Exmoor Diary"
