= Frederic John Poynton =

English physician and cricketer (1869–1943)

Frederick Poynton
Personal information
- Full name: Frederic John Poynton
- Born: 26 June 1869; Kelston, Somerset, England
- Died: 29 October 1943 (aged 74); Weston, Bath, Somerset, England
- Batting: Right-handed

Domestic team information
- Years: Team
- 1891–1896: Somerset
- First-class debut: 1 June 1891 Somerset v Surrey
- Last First-class: 1 June 1896 Somerset v Surrey

Career statistics
Competition	First-class
Matches	25
Runs scored	575
Batting average	13.69
100s/50s	0/3
Top score	57
Balls bowled	70
Wickets	2
Bowling average	19.00
5 wickets in innings	0
10 wickets in match	0
Best bowling	1/6
Catches/stumpings	7/–
- Source: CricketArchive, 30 May 2010

Dr. Frederic John Poynton M.D., F.R.C.P. (26 June 1869 – 29 October 1943) was an English physician who studied rheumatism in children while practising at Great Ormond Street Hospital and University College Hospital. Also a keen cricketer, he played 25 first-class matches for Somerset County Cricket Club between 1891 and 1896.

== Life and medical career ==
Born in June 1869, Poynton was the son of a Bath clergyman. He was educated first at Marlborough College, and then studied medicine at University College, Bristol. He qualified in 1893 and specialised in children's medicine, which resulted in him being appointed as assistant physician at Great Ormond Street Hospital in 1900, and at University College Hospital (UCH) in 1903. He married Alice Constance Campbell-Orde, daughter of Sir John William Powlett Campbell-Orde in December 1904. UCH appointed him as a full physician in 1910. During the First World War, he served in the Royal Army Medical Corps as a captain. In 1919, he was appointed as a full physician as Great Ormond Street, and over the following years he attempted to secure the site of the Foundling Hospital, which has recently relocated, so that Great Ormond Street could expand. He failed in this endeavour, but these years still provided him with the peak of his medical career. He was the Bradshaw lecturer at the Royal College of Physicians in 1924 and the Lettsomian lecturer at the Medical Society of London in 1927. In 1931, he was elected president of the British Paediatric Association, and in 1934, the year he retired from hospital appointments, he was the Long Fox Lecturer at Bristol. In 1939, he and his wife divorced.

In 1907, he wrote a book on Heart Disease and Thoracic Aneurysm. He was particularly interested in childhood rheumatism, a subject on which he wrote extensively, working with Alexander Paine. His writings were often controversial, fueling feuds with a number of his contemporaries. In Poynton and Paine's 1913 publication Researches on Rheumatism, they formulated a streptococcal theory for the cause of acute rheumatism, which was strongly argued against. He was awarded the Dawson Williams Memorial prize for founding the Heard Homes for convalescent rheumatic children in London. He co-authored Recent Advances in the Study of Rheumatism with Dr Bernard Schlesinger, which reached a second edition in 1937. In his obituary in the British Medical Journal, he is described as a pioneer of the bacteriology of acute rheumatism.

== Cricket career ==
He made his debut for Somerset against Surrey, in a match starting 1 June 1891. He claimed a solitary wicket in Surrey's first-innings, having only bowled two overs, and in Somerset's successive innings—they were forced to follow-on—he remained two not out in the first and was dismissed for seven in the second as Somerset only managed 37 in each innings. One further appearance in 1891 against Kent saw him pick up a single run as the Somerset innings closed with Poynton unbeaten.

His next matches for Somerset weren't until 1893, when he appeared 12 times for the county, the most he would play in any single season of his career, After scoring runs down the order in the early part of the season, Poynton batted as part of the top order most of the year. He scored his first half-century in first-class cricket as an opener, making 51 against Yorkshire. Yorkshire were also the opponents when he claimed his second, and final career first-class wicket, bowling George Ulyett. Two first-class matches in 1894 brought Poynton little success, he averaged just 6.50 with the bat.

Poynton reached his highest total in first-class cricket in an 1895 match against Sussex, scoring 57 before being run out. A high-scoring match, it also provided highest career scores to team-mate Sammy Woods who scored 215, and Sussex's Francis Marlow who scored 155. He scored his final half-century in a county match against Hampshire with a second-innings 55, which helped set up a 183 run victory for Somerset. He played in four matches in 1896, and in eight innings failed to reach 20. His final first-class match was, like his first, against Surrey at The Oval starting on 1 June and, as with the first, Somerset suffered a heavy loss.
