= Gerald Fowler (cricketer) =

English cricketer

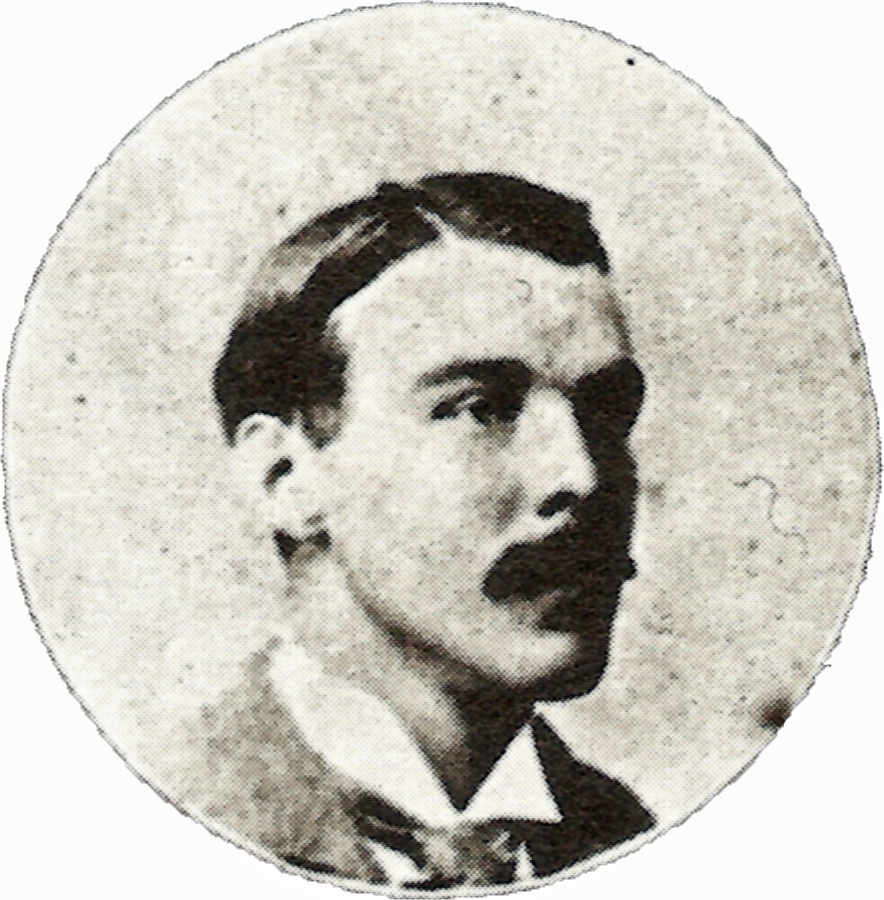

Personal information
- Full name: Gerald Fowler
- Born: 27 July 1866; Leytonstone, Essex, England
- Died: 24 May 1916 (aged 49); Trull, Somerset, England
- Batting: Right-handed
- Bowling: Right-arm fast-medium

Domestic team information
- Years: Team
- 1890–1903: Somerset
- 1884–1889: Essex
- 1888–1889: Oxford University
- First-class debut: 17 May 1888 Oxford University v Australians
- Last First-class: 10 August 1903 Somerset v Kent

Career statistics
Competition	First-class
Matches	132
Runs scored	3571
Batting average	16.84
100s/50s	1/13
Top score	118
Balls bowled	5430
Wickets	92
Bowling average	31.03
5 wickets in innings	4
10 wickets in match	0
Best bowling	6/50
Catches/stumpings	66/–
- Source: , 12 February 2010

Gerald Fowler (27 July 1866 – 24 May 1916) was an English cricketer who made 119 first-class appearances for Somerset between 1891 and 1903. A son of William Fowler, a politician, Gerald Fowler was educated at Clifton College and Oriel College, Oxford. He died in 1916 after an operation for appendicitis.

== Career ==
A right-handed batsman and right-arm fast-medium bowler, Fowler made his first appearance in county cricket for his native Essex, who did not have first-class status at the time. The 18‑year‑old Fowler claimed four wickets in the match He continued to appear for Essex over the following years, playing his final match for the county in May 1889. By this time, he had already made his first-class debut for Oxford University against the touring Australians.

He joined Somerset for their successful 1890 season, and remained part of their team following their admittance to the County Championship the following summer. During the 1891 season, Fowler claimed his best bowling return, taking six wickets in an innings against the Marylebone Cricket Club (MCC). Fowler frequently opened the batting for Somerset, and it was from this position that he made his top-score, and only century, against Gloucestershire in 1895.
