= Henry Pallett =

English cricketer

Personal information
- Full name: Henry James Pallett
- Born: 2 January 1863; Birchfield, Staffordshire, England
- Died: 18 June 1917 (aged 54); Aston, Warwickshire, England
- Batting: Right-handed
- Bowling: Right-arm slow

Domestic team information
- Years: Team
- 1894–1898: Warwickshire
- 1903: Staffordshire

Career statistics
Competition	First-class
Matches	77
Runs scored	929
Batting average	11.19
100s/50s	–/2
Top score	55*
Balls bowled	16,459
Wickets	305
Bowling average	21.57
5 wickets in innings	21
10 wickets in match	7
Best bowling	9/55
Catches/stumpings	21/–
- Source: Cricinfo, 25 March 2019

Henry James Pallett (2 January 1863 – 18 June 1917) was an English cricketer who played first-class cricket between 1886 and 1898, principally for Warwickshire. He was born in Birchfield, then in Staffordshire, and died at Aston, Birmingham.

Pallett was a right-handed lower-order batsman, though early in his career he batted higher up the batting order, and a right-arm slow bowler. Prominent in Birmingham area club cricket, he played for Warwickshire from 1883, though the county's games were not considered first-class until 1894, and the team was not included in the County Championship until 1895. At the end of the 1886 season, he was picked for a non-Test match England XI to play the Australian touring team under the captaincy of W. G. Grace and this game was his first-class cricket debut. He then played for the North against the 1890 Australians, in the 1891 North v South match, and for a team representing "Second-Class Counties" against the 1893 Australians: in none of these matches did he make much impact with either bat or ball.

In 1894, Warwickshire's matches against first-class teams were deemed also to be first-class, and Pallett played 15 matches that year, with outstanding success: he took 79 wickets at an average of 11.87 and among significant wicket-takers was behind only Test cricketers Dick Pougher and Tom Richardson in the national averages. He took five wickets in an innings 10 times and had three 10-wicket matches. His best return of the season, and of his entire first-class career, came in the match against Essex at Leyton, when he took nine first-innings wickets for 55 runs and followed that with five for 45 in the second innings for a match return of 14 for 100. He took a further 11 wickets in the return match at Edgbaston two weeks later.

The more competitive cricket that Warwickshire's entry into the County Championship in 1895 brought had some impact on Pallett's bowling figures, but with 95 wickets at an average of 21.49 he was the team's leading wicket-taker and second only to the irregular bowler Alfred Glover in terms of average. His best bowling came in an early-season game against Derbyshire, when he took eight first-innings wickets for 69 runs, and these were the best Championship figures he achieved in his career. He was less effective in 1896, when his 74 wickets cost more than 25 runs apiece, and even less so in 1897, with a poor return of 44 wickets costing more than 33 runs each. In these seasons, however, his batting improved and he made two scores of 55, the first of them, against Surrey in 1896, being not out and therefore counting as his highest first-class score.

After a few games in 1898, he disappeared from first-class cricket, although he played in a few Minor Counties matches for Staffordshire in 1903. By profession, he was a schoolmaster.
