= Herbie Hewett =

English amateur cricketer (1864–1921)

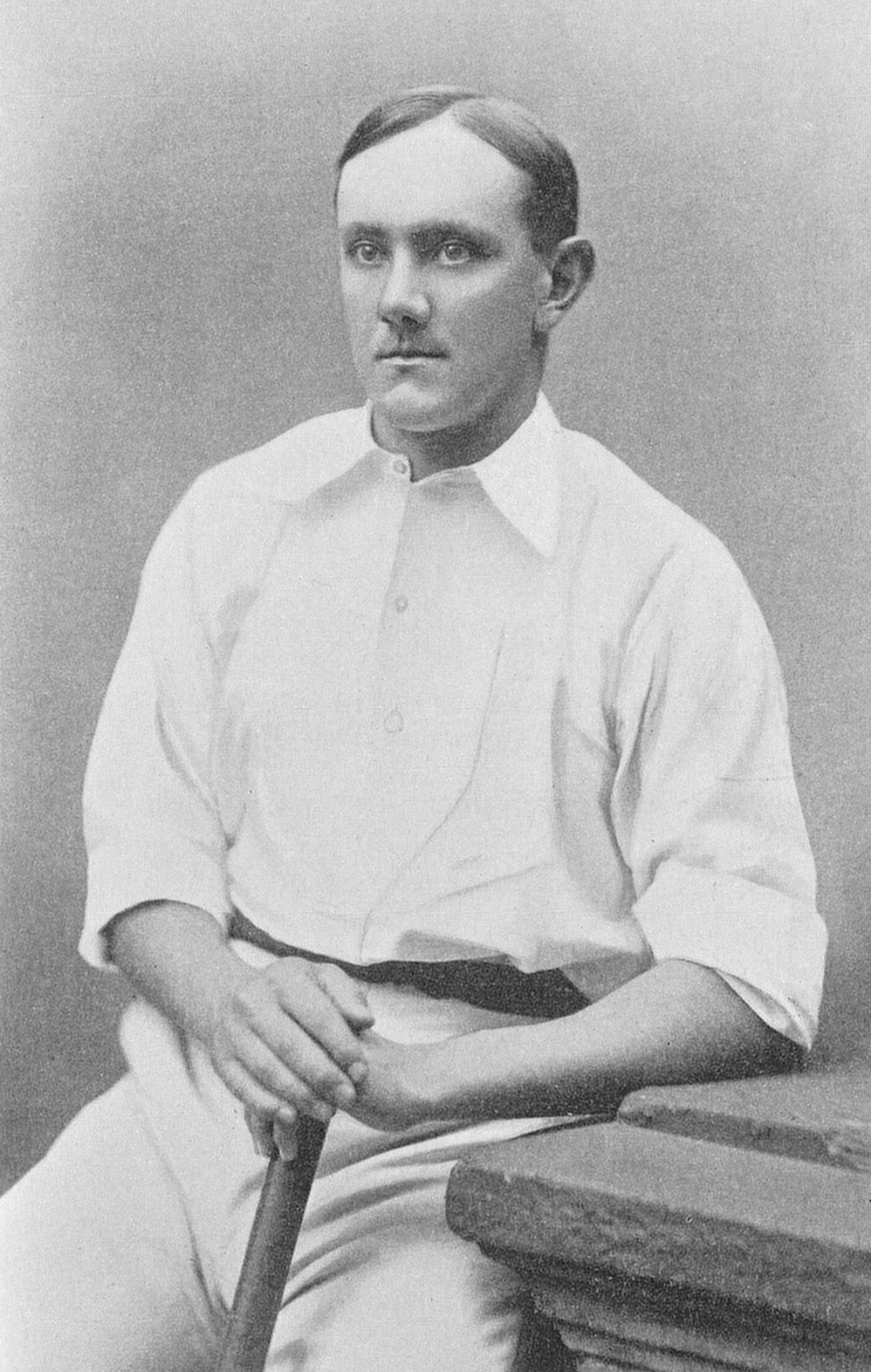

Personal information
- Full name: Herbert Tremenheere Hewett
- Born: 25 May 1864; Norton Fitzwarren, Somerset, England
- Died: 4 March 1921 (aged 56); Hove, Sussex, England
- Batting: Left-handed
- Bowling: Medium

Domestic team information
- Years: Team
- 1884–1893: Somerset
- 1886–1887: Oxford University
- 1888–1896: Marylebone Cricket Club
- FC debut: 25 August 1884 Somerset v Kent
- Last FC: 29 June 1895 MCC v Oxford University

Career statistics
Competition	First-class
Matches	106
Runs scored	5,099
Batting average	29.30
100s/50s	7/30
Top score	201
Balls bowled	454
Wickets	2
Bowling average	120.00
5 wickets in innings	0
10 wickets in match	0
Best bowling	2/40
Catches/stumpings	49/–
- Source: CricketArchive, 10 October 2010

Herbert Tremenheere Hewett (25 May 1864 – 4 March 1921) was an English amateur cricketer who played for Somerset, captaining the county from 1889 to 1893, as well as Oxford University and the Marylebone Cricket Club. A battling left-handed opening batsman, Hewett could post a large score in a short time against even the best bowlers. Capable of hitting the ball powerfully, he combined an excellent eye with an unorthodox style to be regarded at his peak as one of England's finest batsmen.

Hewett was educated at Harrow School, won a blue at Oxford in 1886 and played for Somerset from 1884. As an inconsistent middle-order batsman he made little impact during this period. Even so, he was appointed captain of Somerset in 1889. Over the next two years, his leadership and performances as an opening batsman were instrumental in the county regaining first-class status and admission to the County Championship in 1891. He remained Somerset captain for a further three seasons, usually opening the batting with Lionel Palairet. In 1892, they shared a partnership of 346 for the first wicket, of which Hewett scored 201. The stand remains the county's highest first-wicket partnership. (Note: As of February 2011.) In that season, Hewett made 1,405 runs at an average of more than 35, and was named as one of the "Five Batsmen of the Year" by Wisden. His highest accolade was being selected to play for the Gentlemen against the Players at Lord's in 1894. A disagreement over whether play should take place on a sodden pitch in the match against the Australians in 1893 led to Hewett's departure from Somerset at the end of that season.

He played first-class cricket for three more years, during which time he scored centuries against both Oxford and Cambridge Universities, appearing for a variety of amateur and representative sides. Having been selected to captain an "England XI" at Scarborough in 1895, Hewett was involved in another incident caused by a wet pitch. Feeling insulted by shouts of derision from the crowd, he left the match at lunch-time on the first day. Hewett made only one further first-class appearance: playing for the Marylebone Cricket Club against Oxford University in 1896. Hewett practised as a barrister, having been called to the bar at the Inner Temple.

== Early life ==
Herbert Tremenheere Hewett was born at Norton Court in Norton Fitzwarren, near Taunton, on 25 May 1864, the only son of William Henry and Frances M. Hewett. Although he was the couple's only son, they had at least four daughters; in 1871 two older sisters, Emily Louisa and Helen G. Hewett are listed in the census, along with one younger sister, Florance Ethel Hewett. By 1891, Mary W. Hewett is also listed as a younger sister, although by this date both older sisters are no longer registered at the address nor their father William Henry. He was initially educated at Hillside, Godalming where he was captain of the cricket and rugby teams. On leaving Hillside in 1879 he went to Harrow School. In 1881 he had a trial for the school cricket eleven mainly on the strength of his bowling, having taken all ten wickets for 22 runs in a house match. Hewett was part of the school's cricket first eleven in 1882 and 1883, and appeared in the annual contest against Eton College in both years, but did little on either occasion, his highest score being six, made in the first-innings in 1882. In all matches for Harrow he had a batting average of just 7.4 in 1883 and 9.5 in 1884 while his bowling average in 1884 was 32.10. Hewett also appeared in the school association football eleven in 1883. On completion of his studies at Harrow, he attended Trinity College, Oxford. In his reminiscences, W. G. Grace suggests that Hewett "first won some little renown in Public School and 'Varsity cricket, but it was not until he joined Somersetshire that he forced himself to a prominent place in County Cricket."

== Oxford and Somerset (1884–1888) ==
After appearing in The Freshman's Match in 1884, during which he scored zero and eight and took two wickets, Hewett made little impact in his first season at Oxford and was not selected for the university eleven. His debut in first-class cricket came later that season for Somerset County Cricket Club at Tunbridge Wells, when he was 20 years old. Against Kent in late August, he scored 14 and 0 batting as part of the middle order, and claimed his only two wickets in first-class cricket. He made one other appearance in 1884, against Lancashire.

In 1885 Hewett played in a trial match at Oxford without success. He did, however, play in four of Somerset's six first-class matches that summer. In his first game of the season for Somerset, in mid-July, Hewett scored his maiden half-century; he remained 50 not out in the second-innings of a five-wicket victory over Hampshire. He passed 50 for Somerset on two more occasions during 1885, and finished the season with 247 runs at a batting average of 35.28, one of seven seasons in which his average was in excess of 30.

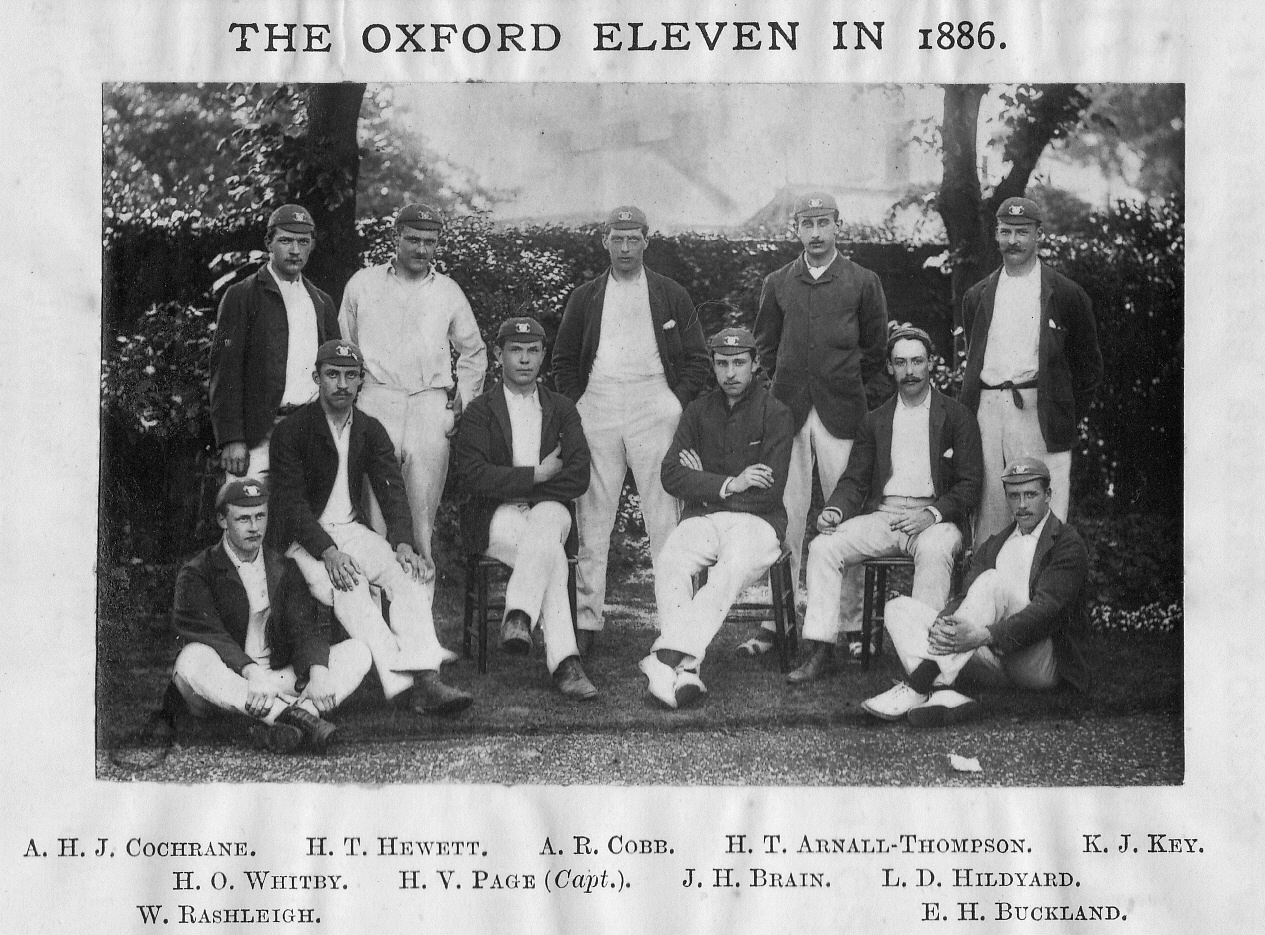
Hewett (back row, second from the left) with the Oxford University cricket team in 1886

He started the 1886 season well, scoring 151 for his college and 164 not out for Perambulators against Etceteras. An 1893 write-up in Wisden Cricketers' Almanack said: "early in the season of 1886 [Hewett] showed signs of the brilliant hitting which has since made him famous". Although he top-scored in the Seniors Match, he was not selected for the eleven until the university's third game. He made scores of 49 and 77 in successive matches for Oxford University against Lancashire and gained his blue, scoring 0 and 7 in the University Match against Cambridge. He finished the season fourth in the Oxford University batting averages with his 160 runs being scored at 22.85, and was described in James Lillywhite's Cricketers' Annual as being: "Sometimes a most dashing left-handed hitter, but not at all dependable; hard-working field."

Poor results in 1885 saw Somerset lose their first-class status for the following seasons. Somerset played just six matches in 1886 of which Hewett played two, top-scoring with 69 against Devon. An injury to his hand prevented him from playing all but one match for the university in his final year at Oxford, 1887, when "he would have had a good chance of retaining his place in the University eleven", according to Wisden Cricketers' Almanack, although he was fit enough to score a century with a broomstick in a college match. During 1887, in a second-class match for Somerset against Warwickshire, Hewett scored 98 to help Somerset to an innings victory, scoring the first 92 runs in less than an hour, an unusually high rate of scoring.

The next year, 1888, he scored successive half-centuries for Somerset early in the season against Warwickshire and Staffordshire before making his debut for the Marylebone Cricket Club (MCC). Facing Oxford University, Hewett made zero and eight for the London club. The same summer, Hewett was selected to play for an England XI against the touring Australians, and in a ten wicket win for the tourists, he scored 12 and 1. Between 1884 and 1888 Hewett had limited success at the first-class level, establishing a reputation as a useful, if erratic, hard-hitting middle-order batsman. He played a lot of club cricket, being a regular for Harrow Wanderers, and scoring 201 not out for Senior Common Room against Christ Church in 1888.

== Captaining Somerset ==
=== Second-class county ===
Hewett's appearances for Somerset in 1889 were more successful. Having previously appeared in the middle-order, Hewett switched to opening the innings at the start of the season, and took on the captaincy. He scored three half-centuries in the season: two against Warwickshire, and one against Staffordshire. (Note: For individual match scorecards see) He comfortably headed the Somerset batting with an average of 38 in matches against the other second-class counties. In his history of Somerset cricket, Sunshine, Sixes and Cider, David Foot describes Hewett's selection policy as captain as being one that was more dependent on the cricketing ability of the player than "of [the player's] social charm and ability to drink into the early hours"—unlike some of his predecessors.

In 1890, his side were unbeaten against county opposition, winning the "Second-class County Championship". In an early season first-class appearance for A. J. Webbe's XI, Hewett scored his maiden first-class century, reaching 114 against Cambridge University. Later in May, for the MCC against Oxford University, he scored 71. Hewett top-scored with 65 in the second-innings of Somerset's opening county match of 1890, and two matches later scored 64 during a first-wicket partnership of 115 with Lionel Palairet against Leicestershire. A string of lower scores followed for just under a month before Somerset hosted Staffordshire at Taunton. Having dismissed the visitors for 43, Hewett remained 203 not out when he declared the Somerset innings closed, scored in four hours, "a remarkable display of powerful and well-timed hitting". He did not pass 100 again that season, but came close during the Scarborough Festival, being bowled for 99 in the second-innings for the Gentlemen of England. Hewett led Somerset's batting averages in 1890, during which the club won twelve and tied one of their thirteen matches against county opposition. Due to this record the county were admitted to the County Championship for 1891 after a unanimous vote, regaining their first-class status.

While Red Lillywhite assessed him as "a dangerous left-hand bat, very free, but somewhat uncertain; good point", after the 1889 season, a year later he was described as "one of the very best left-hand bats in England, hitting hard all round; excellent point. Captain in 1889–1890, which post he filled with wonderful judgement." At the end of the 1890 season he was presented with a handsome silver flask by members of Somerset County Cricket Club.

=== County Championship cricket ===
Hewett (seated, third from the left) with the Somerset team of 1892

Hewett led his side in their first County Championship match starting on 18 May 1891. Although the club had played first-class cricket a few years earlier, the championship had only been formed the previous season. Their debut in the competition was interrupted by rain and finished a draw; Hewett top-scored in Somerset's only innings with 31. Somerset's next match was against reigning county champions Surrey. Lionel Palairet, Bill Roe and Sammy Woods were all missing for various reasons, leaving Hewett with a depleted side and only two real bowlers; Ted Tyler and George Nichols. Surrey reached 449, and then bowled Somerset out twice, for 37 in each innings. When Surrey travelled to Taunton later that season, most likely expecting an easy win to secure a second consecutive championship, Hewett top-scored for his team with 55 in the first-innings as Somerset reached 194. Woods, Nichols and Tyler then secured a 40 run first-innings lead for the home side who added another 331 runs in their second-innings, Hewett contributing 42. The same trio of Somerset bowlers proceeded to bowl the champions out for a second time, the final wicket falling two minutes from the close of play, and their team recorded a 130-run victory. Hewett had a quiet season with the bat, in addition to his 55 against Surrey he passed 50 on only one other occasion; against Middlesex two weeks later. He totalled 514 runs during the season at an average of 19.76; his lowest average when playing eight or more innings in a season.

== Touring North America ==
Following the close of the 1891 County Championship, Hewett was part of Lord Hawke's party which toured North America, playing six matches in the United States and two in Canada. Sammy Woods wrote that Hewett, along with Charles Wreford-Brown and George Ricketts, became very seasick on the journey there. The first two matches were first-class fixtures against the Gentlemen of Philadelphia. Hewett scored 30 and 49 in the first, an eight wicket loss which Woods blamed on taking place too soon after their arrival, saying the team "had hardly found our land-legs." The first match had yielded an aggregate of 861 runs, the second contained only 352, of which Hewett scored 10 and 29. His captain, Lord Hawke, was the only other batsman to reach double figures in both innings as the touring side won by four wickets. None of the remaining fixtures on the tour had first-class status, and not all were eleven-a-side contests. Hewett scored 113 against the sixteen man All New York on Staten Island, a match in which he was standing in as captain due to Lord Hawke being ill. Woods rated Hewett, along with Lord Hawke and Brown, as the best batsmen on the tour.

== Batsman of the Year ==
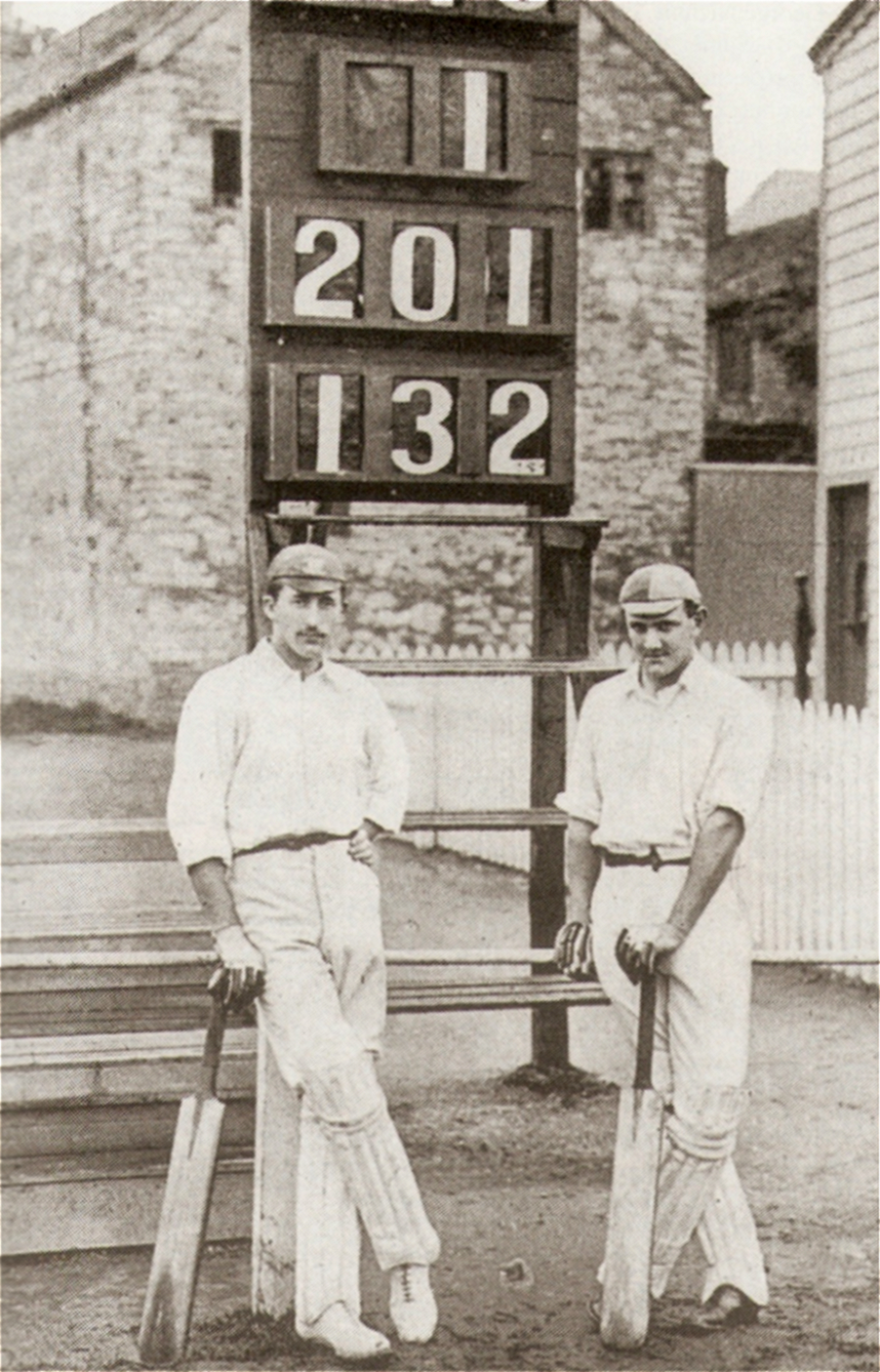
Hewett (right) with Lionel Palairet after their record first-wicket partnership of 346 against Yorkshire in 1892

Hewett's first three matches of the 1892 season were for representative sides against the universities. He reached double figures in each of his six innings, and scored a half-century for the Gentlemen of England against Cambridge. On returning to Somerset, he did not score a half-century until his third match, making 54 against Oxford University. He passed 50 on twelve occasions during the season, the most during any season of his career. In late August, playing Yorkshire, Hewett scored 201 out of a partnership of 346, establishing a record for the first wicket in first-class cricket, surpassing W. G. Grace and Bransby Cooper's 1869 total of 283. Although their record has since been beaten in first-class cricket, it remains Somerset's record partnership for the first wicket. Their partnership was described as "Pure grace at one end, sheer force at the other", in H. S. Altham and E. W. Swanton's A History of Cricket. At the time, The Daily Telegraph reported that the pair remained together for three and half hours, during which Hewett scored 30 fours.

Hewett finished the season with 1,047 runs for Somerset, making him the only batsman in England to score 1,000 runs in county matches. In total he scored 1,407 first-class runs, the most by any batsman, and was third in the amateur batting averages. He was named as one of the Five Batsmen of the Year by the Wisden Cricketers' Almanack in 1893, in which it was claimed that "had it been necessary last August [1892] to put a representative England eleven into the field, Hewett would undoubtedly have been given a place." Under Hewett's captaincy, Somerset won eight, drew three and lost five matches in 1892, finishing third in the County Championship, which would remain their highest position for over 100 years, until the county were runners-up in the competition in 2001. The Times praised the county's achievements during the year, and reserved special praise for Hewett; "Somerset's many brilliant feats, and the fine play of Messrs. Hewett and Palairet in particular, were a marked feature of this year's cricket." After the close of the County Championship, Hewett appeared in three representative matches, captaining the West to victory over the East, and appearing under the captaincy of W.G. Grace for both the South and the Gentlemen v Players.

== Departure from Somerset ==
Hewett began the 1893 season in good form, reaching his half-century in each of his first three matches for the county, including a total of 94 against Oxford University in late May. Hewett missed most of the match against Kent shortly after, returning to Taunton due to the death of his brother-in-law, during which time George Wood replaced him as a substitute. In July 1893, the touring Australians played Somerset at Taunton for the first time since 1882, when both the ground and the county team were barely established. After the success of the 1892 season, and because talented, Australian-born Sammy Woods was playing for Somerset, the match was eagerly anticipated. Thousands arrived in Taunton for the match, but after overnight torrential rain, the umpires inspected the pitch at 11:00 and abandoned play for the day. In his history of the county club, Roebuck suggest that they may have been put under pressure by the Australians or by Hewett himself. The Somerset fans and members were angry at the decision, but the Australians packed picnic baskets and after exchanging strong words with the locals, departed for the Quantock Hills. Hewett, along with Woods and Vernon Hill, arranged to play golf in Minehead. The crowd continued to show their dismay at the decision, and eventually the Somerset officials asked the umpires to take another look at the ground. Woods supported this decision in his reminiscences, claiming that "the decision not to play was premature." At 14:00, after their second inspection, the umpires retracted their previous decision and announced that play could start. Hewett reacted angrily, and argued unsuccessfully against the decision with the Somerset committee. The Australian players were recalled from their picnic, and play began at 16:00, although neither team particularly wanted to play. Roebuck recorded that "Hewett, in particular, was in high dudgeon and ... he threw away his wicket for 12 runs, having been dropped once." David Foot offered a more tempered opinion, saying simply that Hewett's "mind wasn't on the game." No play was possible on the second day, and on the third, Australia won the match by six wickets. Hewett felt let down by the Somerset committee, who he felt had undermined his authority, prompting him to say that "if a captain can't lead at Taunton, this is no place for him." Although friends thought he was overreacting, he declared that he would resign from the captaincy and the club at the end of the season. Both Foot and Roebuck suggested that Hewett reacted in an over-sensitive and extreme manner, but that his lack of self-control may have limited his long-term captaincy prospects.

In his five further games for Somerset before the end of the season Hewett hit two centuries. He reached 120 runs against Nottinghamshire and against Gloucestershire, on his final appearance for the county, he scored 112 runs in just under two hours; according to James Lillywhite's Cricketers' Annual, it "was a splendid display". He scored 1,092 runs in total during 1893, of which his 669 for Somerset in the championship were scored at an average of 31.85, topping the county's batting charts. During his five seasons of first-class cricket for Somerset, he played 51 matches and scored 2,592 runs at an average of 30.85.

== Later cricket career and life ==
After leaving Somerset, Hewett did not continue in county cricket at all, opting to play first-class cricket only for amateur and representative sides. At the tail-end of the 1893 season, he played three times for the South, scoring two half-centuries. In July 1894, Hewett made the second of his two appearances for the Gentlemen against the Players. Unlike his first appearance, made at Hastings, the match was played at Lord's Cricket Ground, which was generally considered to be the more prestigious Gentlemen v Players fixture of the season, being the more representative. These matches were keenly contested during the 1890s, and were considered to be second in prestige only to gaining a Test cap. Batting at number three, Hewett scored 12 runs out of the Gentlemen's total of 254, before Stanley Jackson and Hewett's former Somerset colleague, Sammy Woods, bowled the Players out for 108 and 107. He appeared 11 times in 1894, scoring 579 runs at an average of 34.05, higher than the previous season. Woods described Hewett as being "in splendid form" when he played, and lamented that he was no longer playing for Somerset. He scored his only century of the season for A. J. Webbe's XI, reaching 110 after opening the innings against Oxford University. He continued his form with the bat into 1895, twice scoring centuries for the Gentlemen against the universities, making 109 against Cambridge, and 102 against Oxford. During this season Hewett appeared in his first match for the amateur side I Zingari, who had strong links with both Harrow School and Somerset president Sir Spencer Ponsonby-Fane.

Hewett played all three matches of the 1895 Scarborough Festival; he opened the innings for the MCC against Yorkshire, and then captained the South in their loss against the North. In the third match, Hewett was named captain of an England XI, a compliment for the former Somerset captain. However, rain meant the start was delayed. Unlike a couple of years earlier, Hewett was happy to ignore the puddles in the field and start the match at the scheduled time. The umpires disagreed with him, and the crowd, wanting cricket, blamed Hewett for the delay and lack of sport. When he belatedly led his side onto the field, the spectators threw insults at him until the Yorkshire captain, Lord Hawke, angrily shouted "Keep quiet or I'll think about calling the game off". Hewett did not bother with such threats, and left the field, got changed and departed from the ground, taking no further part in the game. Fred Spofforth replaced him in the match which the England side went on to win by nine wickets.

During the English winter of 1895–96, Hewett once again toured with Lord Hawke, travelling to South Africa. Arriving too late to take part in the first match of the tour, he then played the next four matches, but was summoned back to England by important business. The tour included three matches against a South African national team which were deemed to be Tests, but by this stage of the tour Hewett had left South Africa, and he thus completed his cricket career without any Test appearances. He played his final first-class match in 1896, scoring 86 for the MCC against Oxford University. In this match, for unknown reasons, he appeared as "Mr. H Herbert".

When Mr 'Herbert' came in to bat ... many of the spectators in the free seats did not recognise him, but after he had sampled an over or two, an old gentleman, who had shown some knowledge of the game, hit the nail on the head when he remarked: I don't remember to have seen this Mr 'Erbert' before but he's 'class'.

He continued to play cricket for the Harrow Wanderers, MCC and I Zingari until 1901. At the time of the 1901 Census, Hewett was living in Westminster. He was listed as head of the household, the only other resident being a servant.

Hewett practised as a barrister, having trained at the Inner Temple, where he passed at least one exam in 1890. During the First World War, he served in the Territorial Force Reserve as an Assistant Provost Marshal, an appointment which he held from 7 September 1915 until 24 May 1918. He died in Hove, Sussex, on 4 March 1921, and his funeral was held in Norton Fitzwarren four days later. His obituary in The Times describes only Hewett's cricket career, and does not give any details about his later life. It does not mention a spouse or any children. The notice of his funeral in the same paper says: "The whole village [of Norton Fitzwarren] was in mourning and among those present at the graveside were Mr H. E. Murray Anderdon, president, and Mr S. M. J. Woods, secretary of the Somerset Cricket Club."

== Personality and style ==
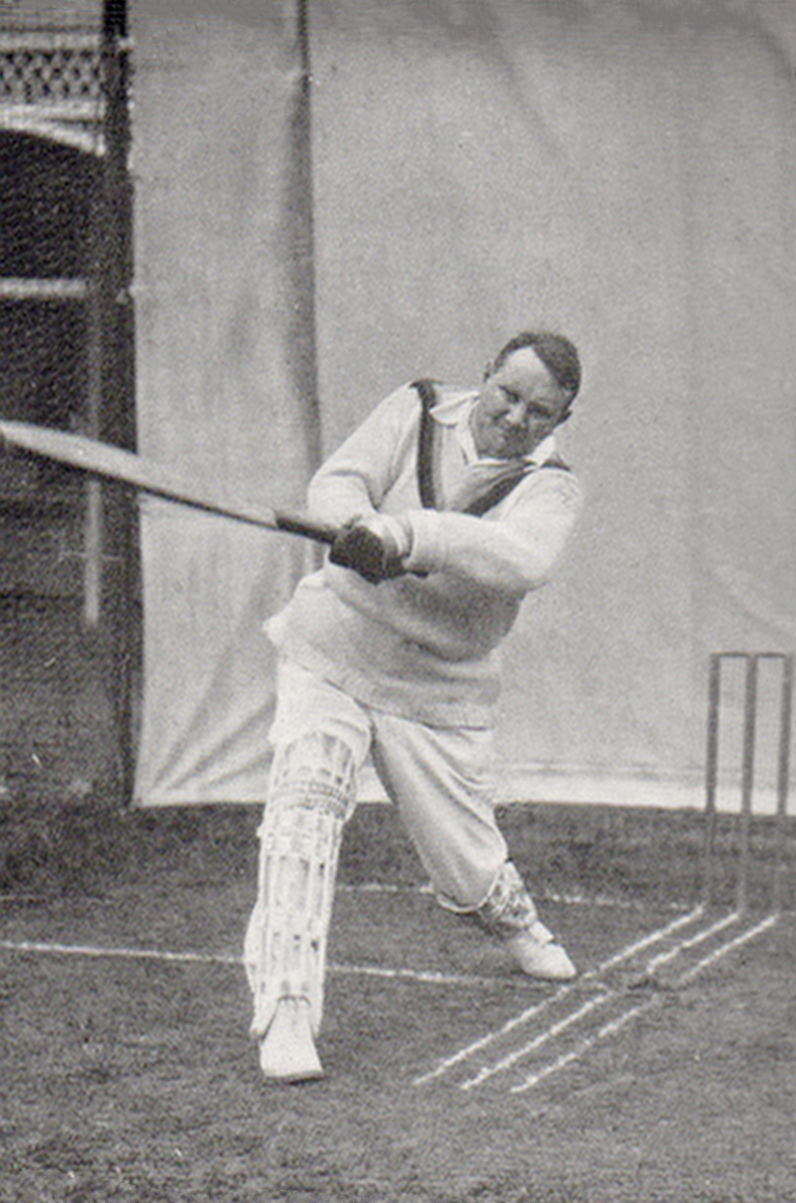
Hewett demonstrating an on drive, photographed by George Beldham in 1905

When Hewett was named as one of the Five Batsmen of the Year by Wisden Cricketers' Almanack in 1893, the publication described him as "the finest left-handed batsman in England". He played in an unorthodox but attractive fashion, which prompted W.G. Grace to praise "his dashing and fearless hitting", while remarking that he had an awkward style. In Somerset, Cider and Sixes, David Foot described that he was "possessed of an eagle eye, considerable meat and the ability to make his forcing shots attractive." In Peter Roebuck's From Sammy to Jimmy, he offered a similar portrait of Hewett's batting style, adding that "he saw it as his task to conquer". Hewett's batting received praise in H. S. Altham and E. W. Swanton's A History of Cricket, where he is described as a "singularly determined and venomous" batsman who "hit the ball in unexpected and demoralizing directions." He frequently scored his runs rapidly, as described by the Reverend R. S. Holmes, who wrote of his batting against Nottinghamshire; "the Captain scored at his usual rate – three out of four runs notched, represent his pace. Against Surrey he got 61 out of 81, this time 60 out of the same total. That's the kind of example every captain should set – a run a minute, or thereabouts." In summary of the 1892 season The Cricket Annual notes that "the Somerset player, in fact, had established the reputation of being the most punishing batsman and rapid scorer of the day, and on last season's form no representative eleven could be considered complete without him." Sammy Woods claimed that Hewett disliked fielding, but offered the view that he was good at point. Woods also related how Hewett would chew on a toothpick, which he always had in his mouth when fielding, when his team was losing.

As evidenced by the manner in which Hewett left Somerset and walked off during the Scarborough Festival of 1895, he possessed a short fuse. Teammate Frederic John Poynton characterised his captain as a player who suffered "from a deep, difficult nature, which once upset, took long to recover". He was a strong leader who was both respected and feared by his colleagues. In 1885, Somerset County Cricket Club had failed to field eleven players for some of their first-class contests, and in most of their other matches were a poor side. Hewett took on the county captaincy in 1889, and in his second year led his side unbeaten against fellow county opposition to win the 'Second-class County Championship', and gain re-admission to the first-class game. Hewett's batting and captaincy were aided by the emergence of Woods and Palairet, both of whom were named as Wisden Cricketers of the Year between 1889 and 1893. In 1891, Somerset finished joint fifth among the nine first-class counties, while the subsequent year they rose to third. Hewett's final season at Somerset was the county's least successful under his captaincy; they won just four of their sixteen matches to finish in eighth.

== Bibliography ==
- Roebuck, Peter (1991). From Sammy to Jimmy: The Official History of Somerset County Cricket Club (1991 ed.). London: Partridge Press. ISBN 1-85225-085-2.
- Foot, David (1986). Sunshine, Sixes and Cider: The History of Somerset Cricket (1986 ed.). Newton Abbot, Devon: David & Charles. ISBN 0-7153-8890-8.
- Woods, S. M. J. (1925). My Reminscences. London: Chapman and Hall Ltd.

Sporting positions
Preceded by Edward Sainsbury	Somerset County Cricket Captain; 1891–1893	Succeeded by Sammy Woods
