= Samuel Wright (English cricketer) =

English cricketer

Samuel Reginald Wright (4 January 1869 – 25 January 1947) was an English cricketer active from 1896 to 1897 who played for Leicestershire. He was born in Markfield and died in Romford. He appeared in three first-class matches as a lefthanded batsman who bowled left arm fast medium. He scored 75 runs with a highest score of 65 and took two wickets with a best performance of one for 14.
