= County Ground, Taunton =

Cricket ground in Somerset, England

Cooper Associates County Ground
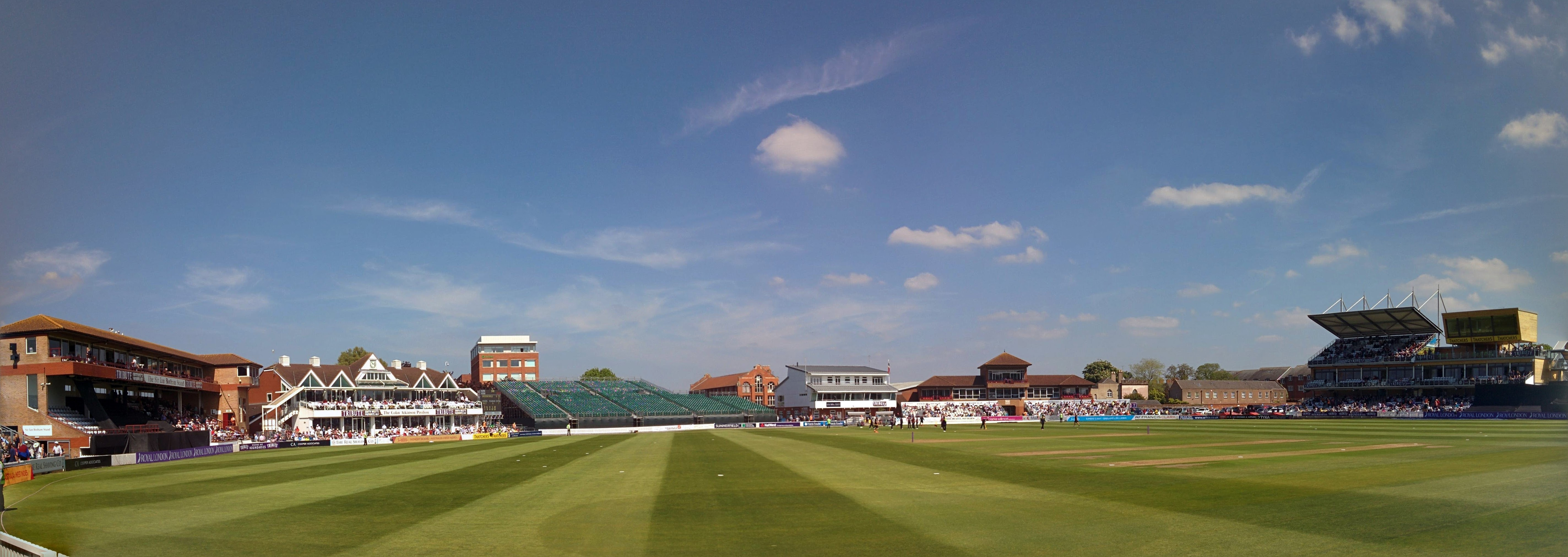
- Panoramic view of the County Ground, Taunton
- Interactive map of Cooper Associates County Ground

Ground information
- Location: Taunton, Somerset
- Country: England
- Coordinates: 51°1′8″N 3°6′3″W
- Establishment: 1882
- Capacity: 8,500 (12,500 for internationals)
- Owner: Somerset County Cricket Club
- Tenants: England women's cricket team (since 2006)
- End names
- The River End Marcus Trescothick Pavilion End

International information
- First men's ODI: 11 June 1983: England v Sri Lanka
- Last men's ODI: 17 June 2019: Bangladesh v West Indies
- Only men's T20I: 23 June 2017: England v South Africa
- First women's Test: 14–18 August 2002: England v India
- Last women's Test: 27–30 June 2022: England v South Africa
- First women's ODI: 17 August 1997: England v South Africa
- Last women's ODI: 7 June 2025: England v West Indies
- First women's T20I: 2 September 2005: England v Australia
- Last women's T20I: 2 June 2026: England v India

Team information
Somerset	(1882 – present)
Western Storm	(2016 – present)
- As of 26 May 2024; Source: Cricinfo

The County Ground, known for sponsorship reasons as Cooper Associates County Ground, is a cricket ground in Taunton, Somerset. It is the home of Somerset County Cricket Club, who have played there since 1882. The ground, which is located between Priory Bridge Road and St James Street, has a capacity of 8,500. The ground was originally built as part of a sports centre by Taunton Athletic Club in 1881, and became the home of the previously nomadic Somerset County Cricket Club soon after. Having leased the ground for ten years, the club bought the ground in 1896, under the guidance of club secretary Henry Murray-Anderdon. The ground ends are the River End to the north and the Marcus Trescothick Pavilion End to the south.

Somerset played their first match of first-class cricket on the ground over 8–10 August 1882, beating Hampshire County Cricket Club by five wickets. Later in the same month, the touring Australia national cricket team played a match against Somerset, becoming the first international side to play at the ground. The first international cricket to be played on the ground was in the 1983 Cricket World Cup, for a group-stage match between England and Sri Lanka. The ground also hosted two group-stage matches during the 1999 Cricket World Cup and venue for the tournament in 2019. Since 1997, women's international cricket has been played at the ground, and in 2006 it became the home of the England women's cricket team. The ground saw (men's) international cricket in 2017, with a Twenty20 International (T20I) tie between England and South Africa.

== History ==
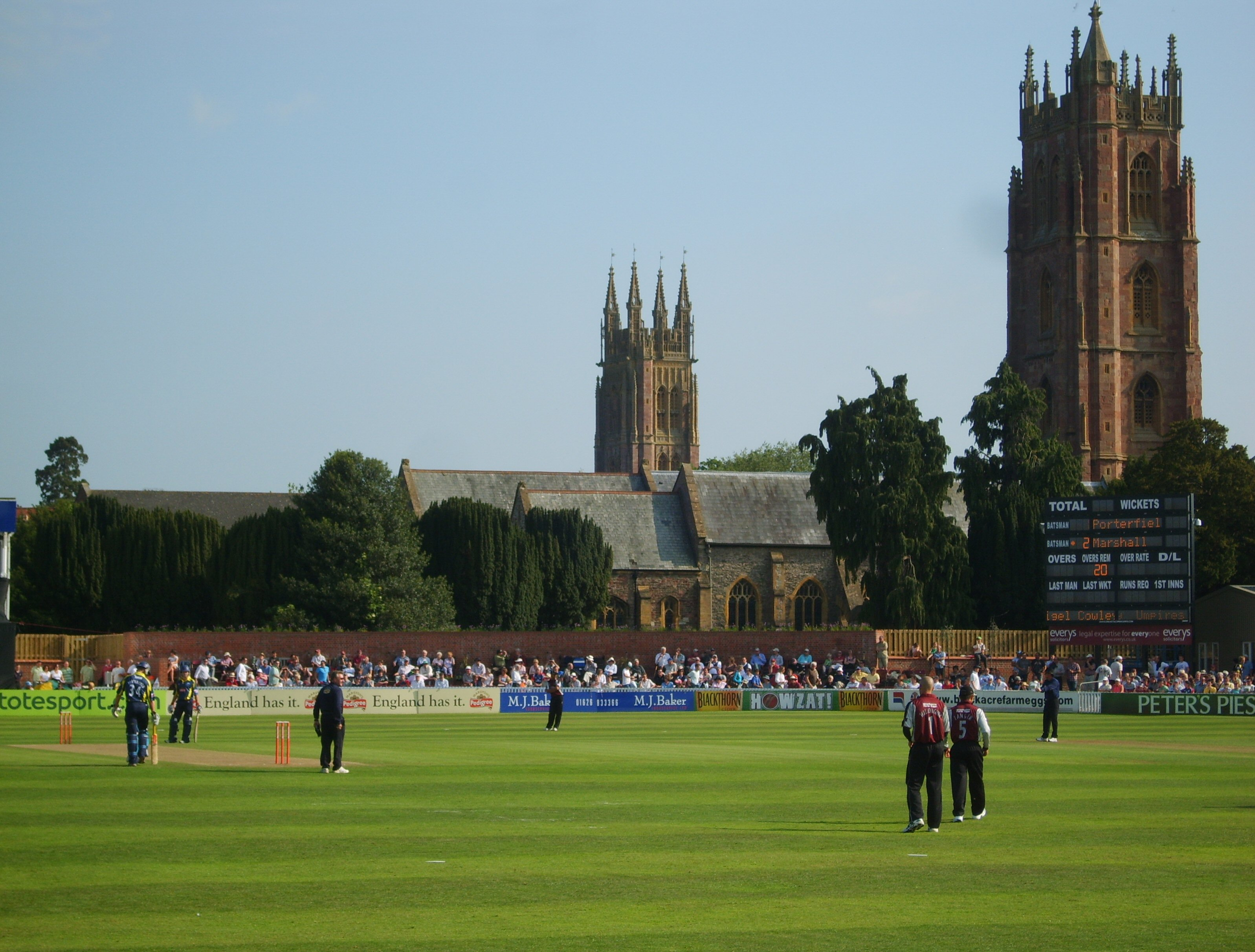
The churches of St James and St Mary Magdalene form the backdrop to the ground

In the winter of 1880, Somerset County Cricket Club, prompted by an article in the Somerset County Gazette describing cricket in Taunton as being "in a sorry plight", were considering building their own ground. Athletics was booming in the town, and it was an amalgamation of sporting clubs that leased seven and a half acres of land known as "Rack Field" from local gentleman farmer John Winter for £50 per year. A cricket pitch, cycling-track and running-track were all laid on the ground with great difficulty; with the land lying next to the River Tone. Although Edward Western promised that Somerset could play fixtures on the ground, he acknowledged that the cricket pitch belonged to Taunton Cricket Club. The new sports centre was opened on Whit Monday 1881, with an athletics fixture held on the newly laid running-track to mark the occasion. Although some cricket was played at the ground in 1881, it was not yet ready for first-class matches. Taunton Athletic Society, thanks to money raised by Western, funded the erection of a grandstand and pavilion on the ground ready for a 15-mile bicycle race between French champion Frédéric de Civry and John Keen in August 1881.

Known as the Taunton Athletic Ground, Somerset County Cricket Club played their maiden first-class game there in 1882. Originally a nomadic club, Somerset played their home matches across the county, relying on the good will of other people. Four first-class matches were played at the ground in 1882; after a five-wicket victory over Hampshire County Cricket Club in the first match, Somerset failed to win any of the remaining games, culminating in an innings and 19 run loss against the touring Australians. Somerset lost their briefly held first-class status in 1886, but in the same year took out a nineteen-year lease on the Athletic Ground. The more loyal members of the club had decided that there was a need to restructure the club and have a permanent home. Somerset regained their first-class status after an unbeaten season in 1890, winning the so-called 'Second-class County Championship'. The first official County Championship match was played at the ground in 1891, a nine-wicket loss to Lancashire. In 1896, ten years after taking out the lease on the ground, the freehold was purchased by the club for £2,000. Under the administration of club secretary Henry Murray-Anderdon, the small ground was developed, with trees planted along the boundary.

By the start of the twentieth century, the ground was, according to Roebuck, "an intimate and lovely place". A section of the ground known as the "Hen Coop" was used by the important families in Taunton, and although there were no official seat reservations, no one else occupied these seats in the absence of their regular user. For the less well off, hard benches were placed around much of the ground, and the floor was used by many others, particularly under some chestnut trees. A public bar was erected soon after, and was well used, especially after the First World War. In 1925, some of the seats were removed in one corner of the ground, and a hill was built to provide a superior view of the ground, using 400 lorry-loads of earth. During the Second World War, the ground, like many others in the country, was lent to the military. It was used by local soldiers and firemen alike, but the groundsman was careful to maintain the cricket surface throughout the war, in preparation for use again at its conclusion.

In 1989 the Somerset Cricket Museum was opened at the ground within the Old Priory Barn, a Grade II* listed building. The exhibits and displays in the museum primarily cover the cricket club's history including Test match players such as Ian Botham and Marcus Trescothick. It also has a section devoted to the England women's cricket team, due to the County Ground being their headquarters. The museum also hosts a collection of I Zingari memorabilia, a club to whom current chairman Charles Clive Ponsonby-Fane has strong family links.

In June 2010, Somerset County Cricket Club officially reopened 'The Colin Atkinson Pavilion' after undergoing GBP1.25 million ($1.8 million) of redevelopment – this, together with the construction of the Marcus Trescothick Stand (in 2008), the Somerset Stand (in 2009), and the Ondaatje Pavilion (in 2011) has enhanced the capacity of the County Ground to 8,500; it is part of phased development plans which will eventually see the venue expand to a capacity of up to 15,000 (including temporary seating) and capable of hosting Test matches.

It hosted three matches at the 2019 Cricket World Cup.

== Structure and facilities ==
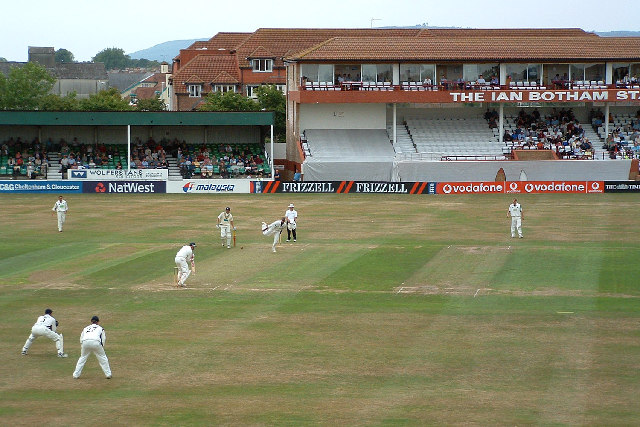
A 2003 image showing the (now demolished) River Stand beside the Ian Botham Stand.

The pitch at the County Ground is surrounded by a number of stands and pavilions. The members' areas, situated at the River End of the ground consists of the Colin Atkinson Pavilion, the Sir Ian Botham Stand and the Marcus Trescothick stand. The non-members' areas, covering the rest of the ground consists of the front of main scoreboard stand, the Family Stand, St James Street Stand, Old Pavilion, Gimblett's Hill and the Somerset Stand.

The largest stand at the County Ground is the Somerset Stand, which was opened at the start of the 2009 season. The stand was built as the first stage of a ground development project, and can accommodate over 3,000 spectators. Behind the Somerset Stand is the Pegasus Court development, containing 65 luxury retirement apartments overlooking the cricket ground. The Old Pavilion is located at the southern end of the ground, and has a small number of seats on its upper tier. On the ground floor, it houses a bar and restaurant. Between the Old Pavilion and the Somerset Stand is Gimblett's Hill, an area that backs onto the churchyard of St. James Church. This section of the ground has a small number of wooden benches at ground-level. To the east of the Old Pavilion is St James Street Stand, a covered section of the ground with a shallow incline.

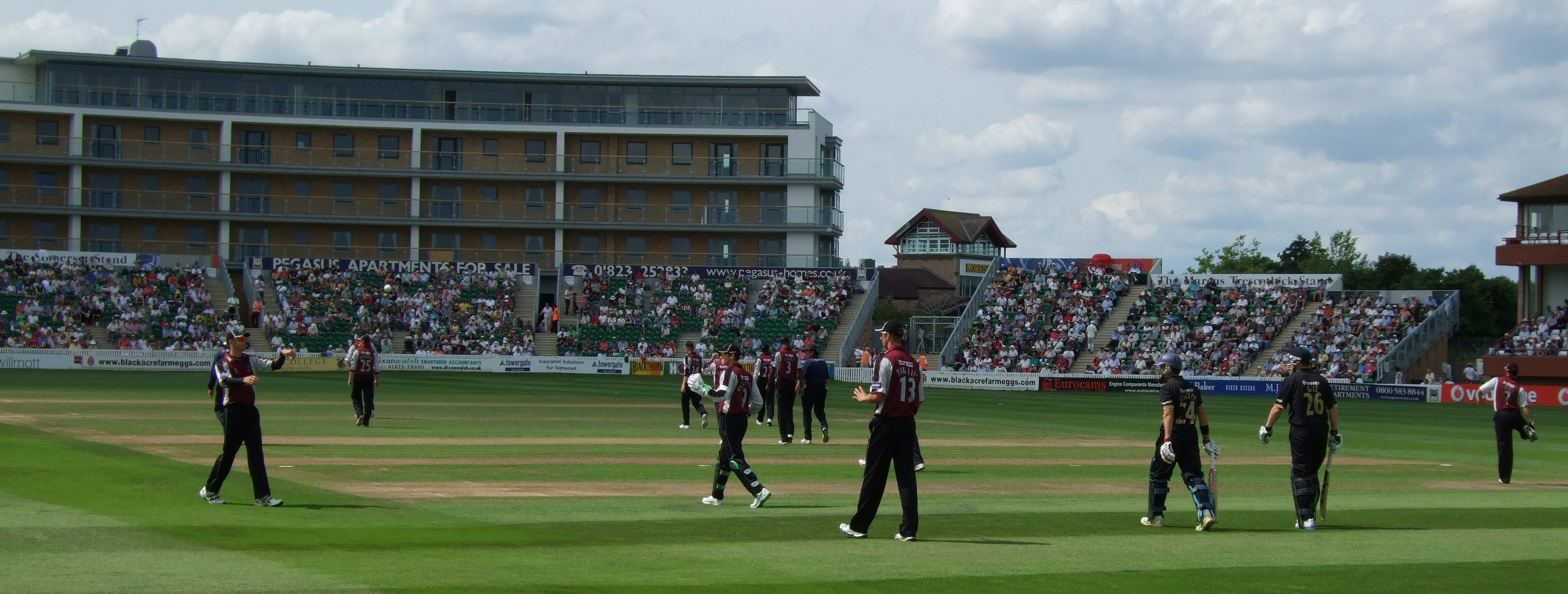
View across the ground towards the Somerset Stand on the left and Marcus Trescothick Stand on the right.

The eastern side of the ground holds both the Family Stand and the front of main scoreboard stand. Between the two are the Ondaatje Pavilion and the Andy Caddick pavilion, the newest of the pavilions on the ground, and the one currently that currently houses the team's changing room facilities. To the north of the front of main scoreboard stand is the Colin Atkinson Pavilion. A member's area, this has a small number of seats and accommodates the member's bar and restaurant. The second tier, formerly the player's changing rooms, has been converted into a Long Room which seats over 180 spectators. The Sir Ian Botham Stand is at the northern end of the ground, and provides covered member's seating. To the west of this is the Marcus Trescothick Stand, which was opened in June 2008.

Scoreboards are located in the north-east and south-west of the ground, and in addition to the restaurant facilities in the Old Pavilion and the Colin Atkinson Pavilion, food outlets are also located in the Somerset Stand, the Sir Ian Botham Stand and the front of the main scoreboard. The club shop is situated behind the St James Street Stand.

== Development ==
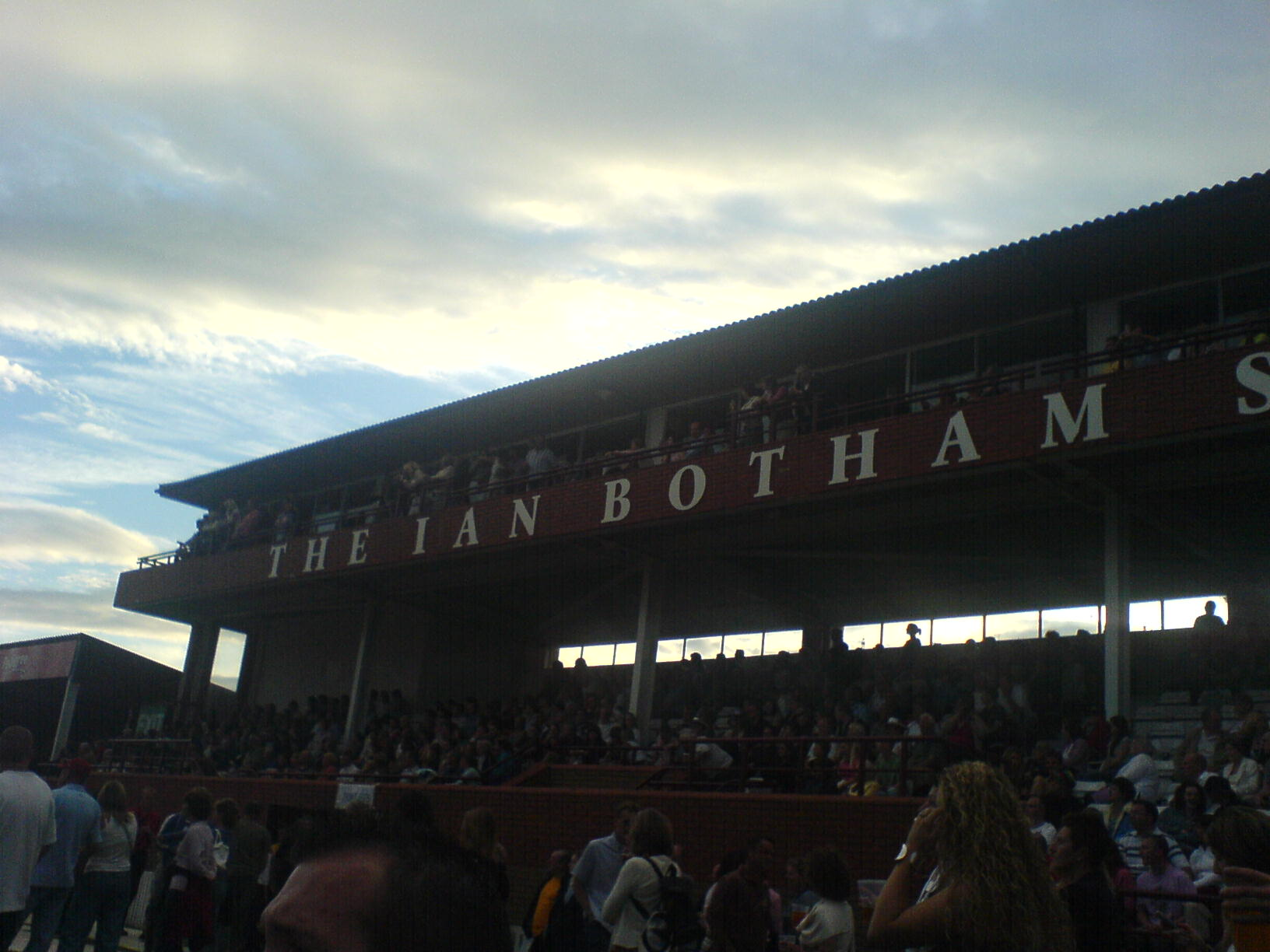
The Ian Botham Stand

After a long debate by Somerset members on the future location of the cricket club, or redevelopment of the existing ground, the club obtained a grant from the South West Regional Development Agency to fund a feasibility study. The aim of the study was to identify how the development of a new stadium could guarantee the future long-term well-being of Somerset CCC through the construction of modern international standard cricket facilities.

The feasibility study found that both through financial deliberations and the great assistance offered by Taunton Deane Borough Council, that Chairman Giles Clarke announced in April 2006 that the long-term future lies at the County Ground. The project costs total approximately £60 million and will deliver a cricket capacity of up to 15,000. It commenced on 17 January 2008. In order for the club to remain financially viable, the development is to be conducted in phases (see below) in order to allow cricket and other club business to proceed with minimal interruption. Also, in order to fit an international standard pitch on site, it is necessary to increase the boundaries.

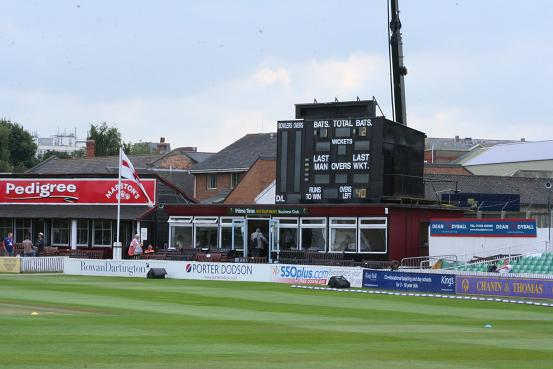
The secondary scoreboard (since demolished)

- Phase 1 – was completed in time for Taunton to be a venue for the 2009 ICC World Twenty20 Championship.It incorporates a new stand with a capacity for 3,000 seats. Additionally there will be a residential development and commercial units fronting on to the town centre
- Phase 2 – will see the development of a new South Stand, and media facilities required for International and First Class Cricket. There will be a new and improved indoor school with glass walls facing on to St James Street, as well as other multi sport facilities available to the public. In addition to some residential opportunities this phase will also include a reception area, café, new club shop and other commercial facilities
- Phase 3 – is part of the plans for the Taunton Vision Firepool redevelopment. As well as a new stand and extensive corporate facilities the study has also concluded that the development of a major conference and banqueting facility would be of great benefit to the South West region. There will be a low level multi-story car park with club and commercial office space in the tower above.

In October 2012, the ECB granted Somerset approval to move the County Ground to the technical specifications required for international one day cricket, paving the way for smaller international fixtures to be held at the ground in the future.

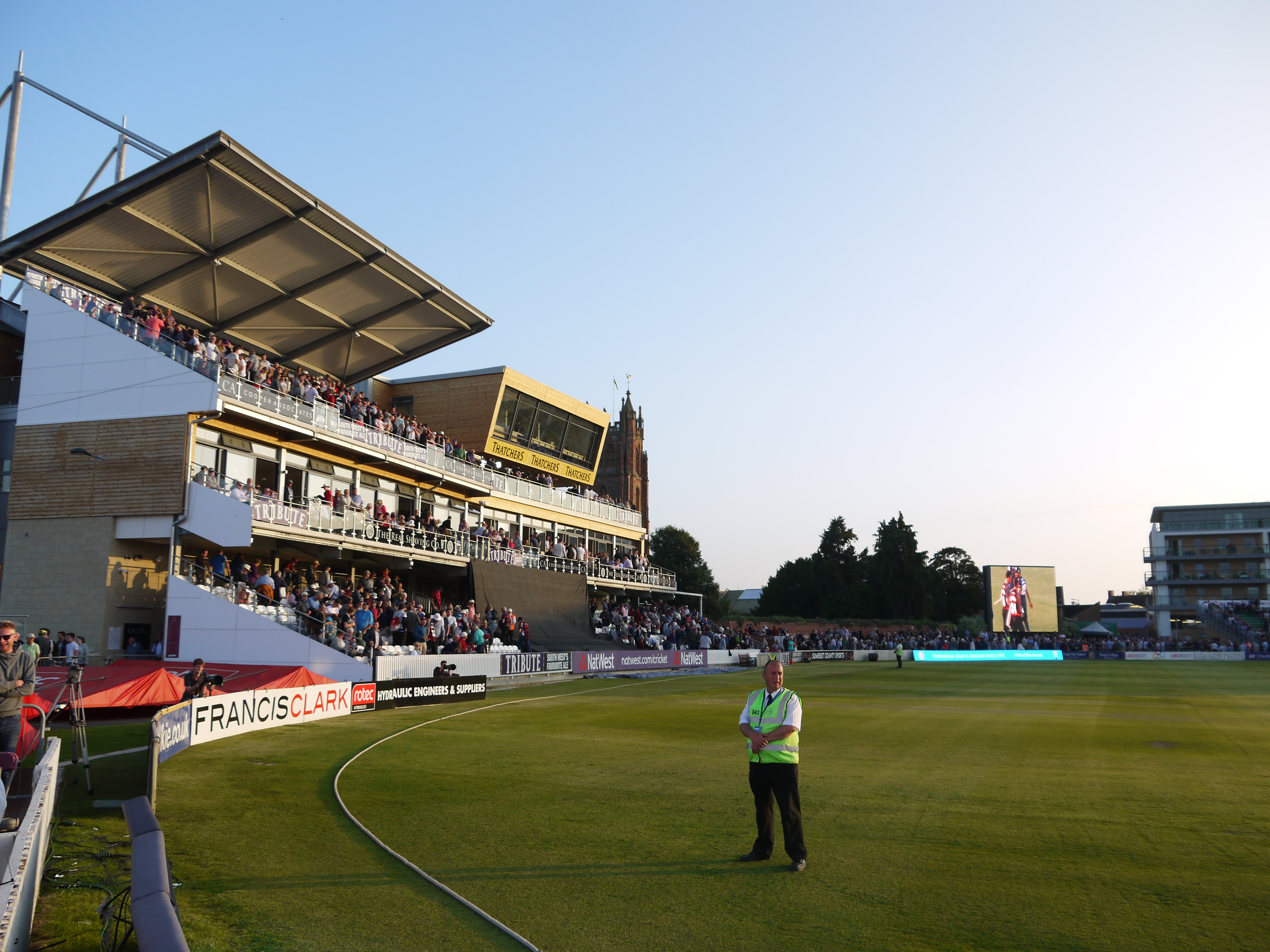
New Somerset Pavilion

Phase 2 (as above) is currently under-way. The Old Pavilion and adjacent St James Street Stand were demolished shortly after the conclusion of the 2014 season, to make way for the new Somerset Pavilion, which was completed in time for the 2016 season. The new pavilion includes a dedicated media centre, the Stragglers Bar, an increase in seating by around 500 and also extends the boundary – allowing for international cricket to be played once again at the County Ground.

== Greyhound racing ==
Independent (unaffiliated to a governing body) greyhound racing took place at the County Ground from 1961 to 1979. The track was constructed around the perimeter of the cricket pitch and was used from 8 December 1961 until 3 May 1979. The track was known as the Priory Greyhound Stadium with racing was on Tuesday and Friday evenings at 7.30pm. It was described as a pear shaped track with distances of 275, 400, 500, 525, 750 and 900 yards. The circumference was 485 yards and the hare system was an 'outside McKee'. It was closed by the promoter at the time, Dan Pipe.

== Other uses ==
On 18 June 2006, the Cricket Ground hosted an open-air concert by Elton John to a sell-out 23,000 crowd. Elton John's dedication of one of his songs to Ian Botham revealed the retired English cricketer to be in the audience, watching from his namesake pavilion. Elton John then performed at the County Ground again on 3 June 2012, a day before he then played at the Diamond Jubilee Concert in London.

In October 2008, as part of Marcus Trescothick's benefit season, the ground was converted into a baseball field, and a team of cricketers led by Trescothick, known as 'Marcus Trescothick's Bangers' took on the Great Britain national baseball team. Great Britain won 21–1.

== International centuries ==
There are six ODI centuries that have been scored at the venue.

No.	Score	Player	Team	Balls	Opposing team	Date	Result
1	130	David Gower	England	120	Sri Lanka	11 June 1983	Won
2	183	Sourav Ganguly	India	129	Sri Lanka	26 May 1999	Won
3	145	Rahul Dravid	India	120	Sri Lanka	26 May 1999	Won
4	107	David Warner	Australia	111	Pakistan	12 June 2019	Won
5	124*	Shakib Al Hasan	Bangladesh	99	West Indies	17 June 2019	Won
6	129	Nat Sciver-Brunt	England	149	Australia	18 July 2023	Won

== Five-wicket hauls ==
There are 4 five-wicket hauls in ODI matches have been taken at the venue.

No.	Bowler	Date	Team	Opposing team	Inn	Overs	Runs	Wkts	Econ	Result
1	Vic Marks	11 June 1983	England	Sri Lanka	2	12	39	5	3.25	Won
2	Robin Singh	26 May 1999	India	Sri Lanka	2	9.3	31	5	3.26	Won
3	James Neesham	8 June 2019	New Zealand	Afghanistan	1	10	31	5	3.10	Won
4	Mohammad Amir	12 June 2019	Pakistan	Australia	1	10	30	5	3.00	Lost

== See also ==
- List of cricket grounds in England and Wales

== Bibliography ==
- Foot, David (3 February 1986). Sunshine, Sixes and Cider: The History of Somerset Cricket (1986 ed.). David & Charles. ISBN 0-7153-8890-8.
- Roebuck, Peter (3 February 1991). From Sammy to Jimmy: The Official History of Somerset County Cricket Club (1991 ed.). London: Partridge Press. ISBN 1-85225-085-2.
