= George Nichols (cricketer) =

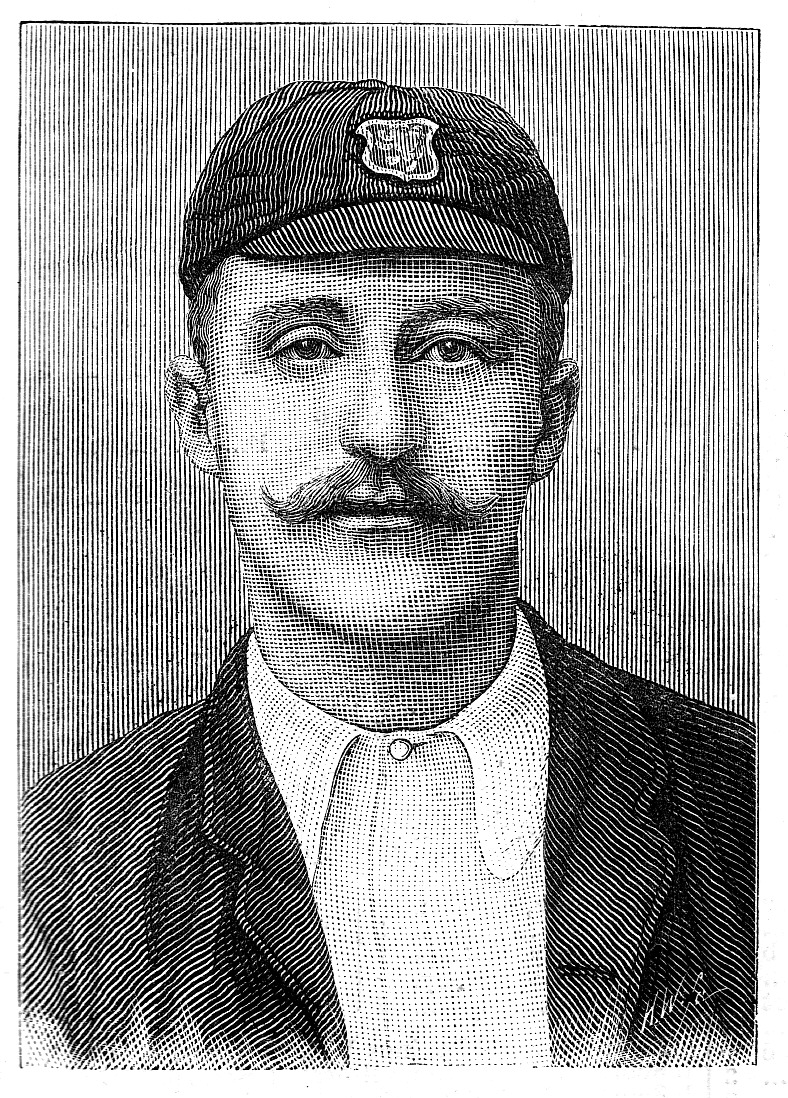

Personal information
- Full name: George Benjamin Nichols
- Born: 14 June 1862; Fishponds, Bristol, England
- Died: 19 February 1911 (aged 48); Dublin, Ireland
- Batting: Right-handed
- Bowling: Right-arm fast-medium
- Role: Bowler

Domestic team information
- Years: Team
- 1883–1885: Gloucestershire
- 1886–1899: Somerset
- FC debut: 28 May 1883 Gloucestershire v Middlesex
- Last FC: 7 August 1899 Somerset v Middlesex

Career statistics
Competition	First-class
Matches	143
Runs scored	2,958
Batting average	13.63
100s/50s	0/8
Top score	74*
Balls bowled	17,497
Wickets	299
Bowling average	23.87
5 wickets in innings	7
10 wickets in match	0
Best bowling	6/75
Catches/stumpings	65/–
- Source: CricketArchive, 6 December 2009

George Benjamin Nichols (14 June 1862 – 19 February 1911) was an English professional first-class cricketer who played 134 matches for Somerset, after starting his career with five first-class appearances for Gloucestershire. He was a key part of the Somerset team that won the 'Second-class County Championship' in 1890 by winning twelve of their thirteen matches, tying the other with Middlesex. A right-handed batsman and right-arm fast-medium bowler, he was known for being able to bowl long, accurate spells.

== Career ==
=== Early career ===
Nichols began his career at Gloucestershire, taking just three wickets as part of a bowling attack dominated by W. G. Grace. His five first-class matches for the county came over three seasons and in 1886 he moved to bordering Somerset. Somerset had just lost their first-class status, having failed to arrange a sufficient number of matches against other first-class counties in 1885. Having customarily batted as part of the tail for Gloucestershire, Nichols opened the batting alongside fellow professional Albert Clapp on his first recorded appearance for Somerset in July 1886. A highlight for Nichols during these early years at Somerset was his 6/30 during the 1887 match against Hampshire. Typifying his bowling, he bowled 32.2 overs, of which 24 were maidens.

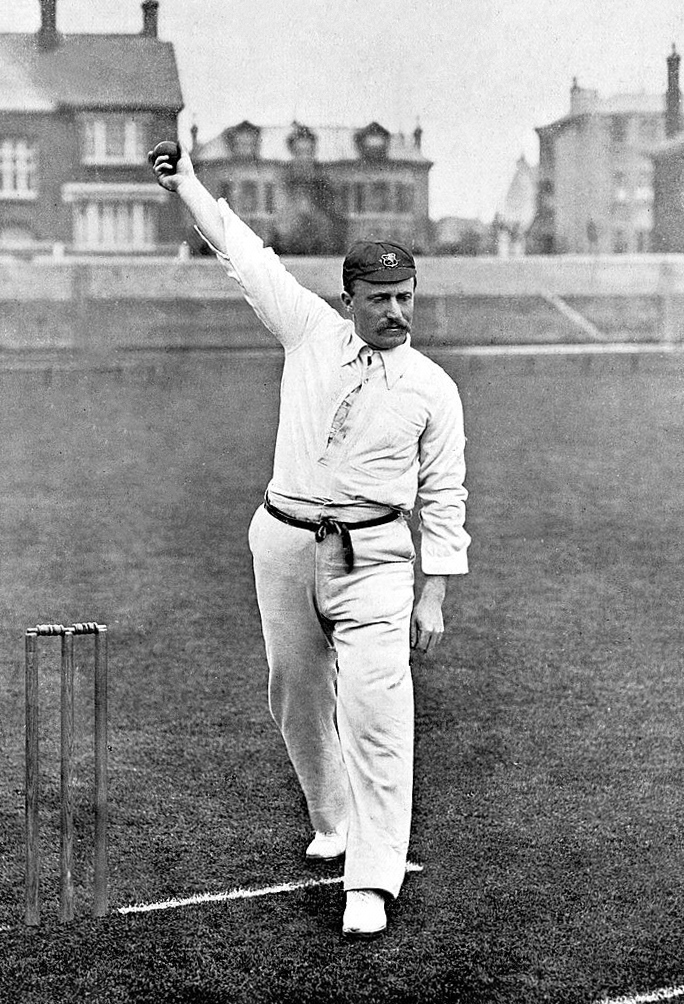
George Nichols

=== 1890 season ===
The demotion from first-class cricket in 1886 had stung the pride of Somerset, and they were determined to regain first-class status. Plans were immediately put into action to turn things around, with a nineteen-year lease taken on their ground, and a declaration from club-secretary Henry Murray-Anderdon: "There's only one way we'll do it, we must demonstrate that we are good enough." Thirteen fixtures were arranged against a variety of first-class and other second-class counties. Their first match of the season was at Lord's, against a Middlesex team that was part of the inaugural official County Championship. The Middlesex side, which contained four players with Test caps, dismissed Somerset for 133 in their first-innings, Nichols one of James Phillips' seven victims. Nichols' three wickets helped to limit the Londoners to 132, giving Somerset a first-innings lead, albeit by a single run. After a second-innings in which Somerset scored 208, they had to take all ten Middlesex wickets for less than 209 to secure the win. Opening pair A E Stoddart and A J Webbe both failed to make double-figures, bowled by Nichols and Ted Tyler respectively. Nichols went on to take 5/55, and Middlesex were bowled out for 131, giving Somerset a 78 run victory.

In the next match, against Hampshire, Nichols went one step further. After taking eight wickets in the first-innings, he already had one wicket to his name in the second-innings when C R Young was caught by Cres Robinson off his bowling, handing Nichols a ten-wicket haul in the match, and more importantly, granting Somerset the win by just two runs. Against Leicestershire, Nichols scored 95 batting at number three as the West Country team amassed a first-innings total of 415. Nichols and Tyler combined to take all ten Leicestershire wickets in their first-innings, Nichols claiming six, restricting them to 61. Enforcing the follow-on, Somerset took eighty-three overs to bowl Leicestershire out for a second time, Nichols claiming a solitary wicket. Staffordshire were the next to fall victim, losing by an innings and 149 runs as Nichols claimed another ten-wicket haul. In the next match, against Warwickshire, Nichols took three wickets in each innings, Tyler taking all the rest. Nichols top-scored for Somerset in both innings; claiming two half-centuries, and narrowly missed out on a third consecutive fifty when he was bowled on 49 against Glamorgan a few days later. His good form with the bat continued as he hit 110 against Leicestershire at Grace Road in early August. In the return fixture against Staffordshire the visitors were two batsmen short which, in addition to a pair of run outs, left only fourteen wickets on offer. Nichols claimed five of them, leaving the slow bowler Tyler to collect the other nine.

Although quiet with the bat against Hampshire, Nichols took eight wickets in the match, seven of them coming in the second-innings as Somerset won by 168 runs. In the next two matches, he scored only ten runs in his three batting innings, and took one wicket in each of his four with the ball in hand. The final match of the season brought him seven further wickets, and secured Somerset an unbeaten season. Nichols finished the season second amongst Somerset wicket-takers, his 79 wickets trailing only the 126 taken by Tyler. In the 556.1 overs that he bowled in the season, he delivered only two no-balls. From the matches with available scorecards, (Note: CricketArchive records a match played against Devon, but the scorecard is unavailable.) Nichols took five-wicket hauls on six occasions in 1890 and claimed ten wickets in a match twice. Unfortunately for Somerset, he was unable to replicate this form in the following first-class seasons, finishing his career with seven first-class five-wicket hauls, and no ten-wicket matches.

== Bibliography ==
- Foot, David (3 February 1986). Sunshine, Sixes and Cider: The History of Somerset Cricket (1986 ed.). David & Charles. ISBN 0-7153-8890-8.
