= Sammy Woods =

Australian sportsman (1867–1931)

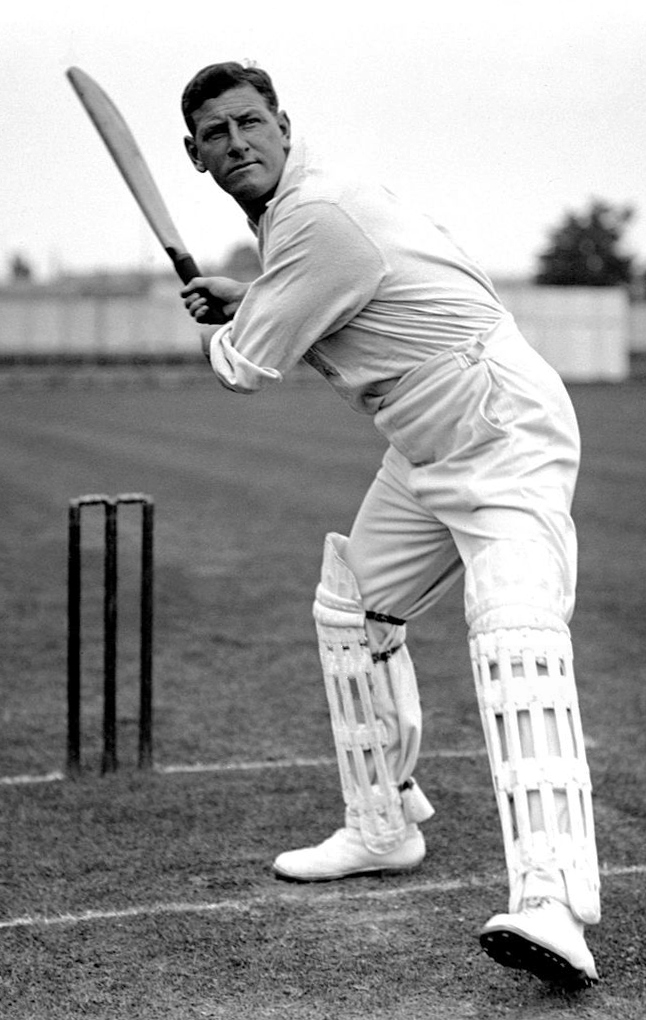

Personal information
- Full name: Samuel Moses James Woods
- Born: 13 April 1867; Ashfield, Sydney, Australia
- Died: 30 April 1931 (aged 64); Taunton, Somerset, England
- Batting: Right-handed
- Bowling: Right arm fast medium
- Role: All-rounder

International information
- National sides: Australia (1888); England (1896)
- Test debut (cap 54/100): 16 July 1888; Australia v England
- Last Test: 21 March 1896; England v South Africa

Domestic team information
- Years: Team
- 1891–1910: Somerset
- 1889–1902: Marylebone Cricket Club
- 1888–1891: Cambridge University

Career statistics
Competition	Test	First-class
Matches	6^{[a]}	401
Runs scored	154	15345
Batting average	15.40	23.42
100s/50s	0/1	19/62
Top score	53	215
Balls bowled	412	41195
Wickets	10	1040
Bowling average	25.00	20.82
5 wickets in innings	0	77
10 wickets in match	0	21
Best bowling	3/28	10/69
Catches/stumpings	5/–	279/–
- Source: CricketArchive, 2 December 2008

Rugby union career
- Position: Forward
Amateur team(s)
Years	Team	Apps	(Points)
1886–1907	Bridgwater		
–	Wellington		
–	Wiveliscombe		
–	Blackheath		
–	Barbarians		
International career
Years	Team	Apps	(Points)
1890–1895	England	13	(6)

Official website
- Profile on ESPNscrum

Samuel Moses James Woods (13 April 1867 – 30 April 1931) was an Australian sportsman who represented both Australia and England at Test cricket, and appeared thirteen times for England at rugby union, including five times as captain. He also played at county level in England at both soccer and hockey. At cricket—his primary sport—he played over four hundred first-class matches in a twenty-four-year career. The majority of these matches were for his county side, Somerset, whom he captained from 1894 to 1906. A. A. Thomson described him thus: "Sammy ... radiated such elemental force in hard hitting, fast bowling and electrical fielding that he might have been the forerunner of Sir Learie Constantine."

Having moved to England at the age of sixteen to complete his education, Woods became entrenched in English sport. Having already played cricket and rugby growing up in Australia, at Brighton College he began playing soccer, and while still at the college, represented Sussex at the sport. Woods was also part of a strong cricket team at the college; in the 23 matches he played for them, only two were lost. He made his first-class cricket debut shortly after leaving Brighton College, in August 1886, playing for GN Wyatt's XI against the touring Australians. Later in the same month he made his first appearance for Somerset, a second-class match against Warwickshire. At Cambridge University he achieved blues in both cricket and rugby.

Woods played the first three of his six Test cricket matches during his first year at Cambridge, called up to the Australian squad to face England in 1888 after Sammy Jones contracted smallpox. During this early part of his career, Woods was considered among the finest bowlers in England, and was named as one of the 'Six Great Bowlers of the Year' (later to form the inaugural Wisden Cricketers of the Year) in 1889. He twice claimed in excess of a hundred first-class wickets in an English season, and averaged under twenty in five consecutive seasons from 1888. In an 1890 match for Cambridge University, Woods claimed all ten of the opposition's wickets in the second-innings. However, by the time he was selected as part of the England Test squad to tour South Africa in 1895–96, his bowling was beginning to lose its potency. Additionally curtailed by injuries, Woods claimed five wickets on the tour, thirty less than the leading wicket-taker George Lohmann.

While his bowling worsened, his batting improved; in 133 first-class matches up to the end of 1894, Woods scored one century, while in his next 129 matches he passed a hundred on fourteen occasions. Primarily an aggressive batsman, Woods had fast footwork and was capable of powerful strokes all around the ground, though he favoured the square cut. His twelve-year Somerset captaincy is the longest at the county. He was an attacking captain, once observing: "Draws? They're only for bathing in." He also served the club as secretary from 1920 to 1922.

== Growing up in Australia ==
Samuel Moses James, or Sammy as he commonly came to be known, was born to John Woods and Margaret Ewing on 13 April 1867. His parents, both born and raised in Ireland, had emigrated to Australia in 1853 shortly after their wedding. At the time of their wedding, John Woods was described as a 'labourer', but by the birth of Samuel Woods, he was listed as a 'gentleman', having carried out various contracts in the development of Sydney, and served as the city's mayor for a term in 1865. Sammy Woods was one of five boys all of whom were athletic, and at the age of ten he played a match for an under-16s team captained by one of his elder brothers. A boy short for the match, Sammy was enlisted; he scored a few runs in each innings and claimed three wickets, and was afterwards presented with a cap by his brother, which he later claimed to prize more than even his international caps. Woods was educated at Royston College and Sydney Grammar School, and while at Royston once claimed seven wickets in seven balls. One school season, he claimed seventy wickets at an average of five runs.

Woods often missed school to watch cricket, and recounts that on more than one occasion he "got a jolly good caning". On one such occasion when he was 14, during the English tour of Australia of 1881–82, after buying a couple of the England team drinks, he bowled at George Ulyett in the nets. He played a number of matches for the Manly cricket club, taking part in challenge matches which on occasion included famous cricketers of the day such as Fred Spofforth and Billy Murdoch.

== Education in England ==
=== Brighton College ===
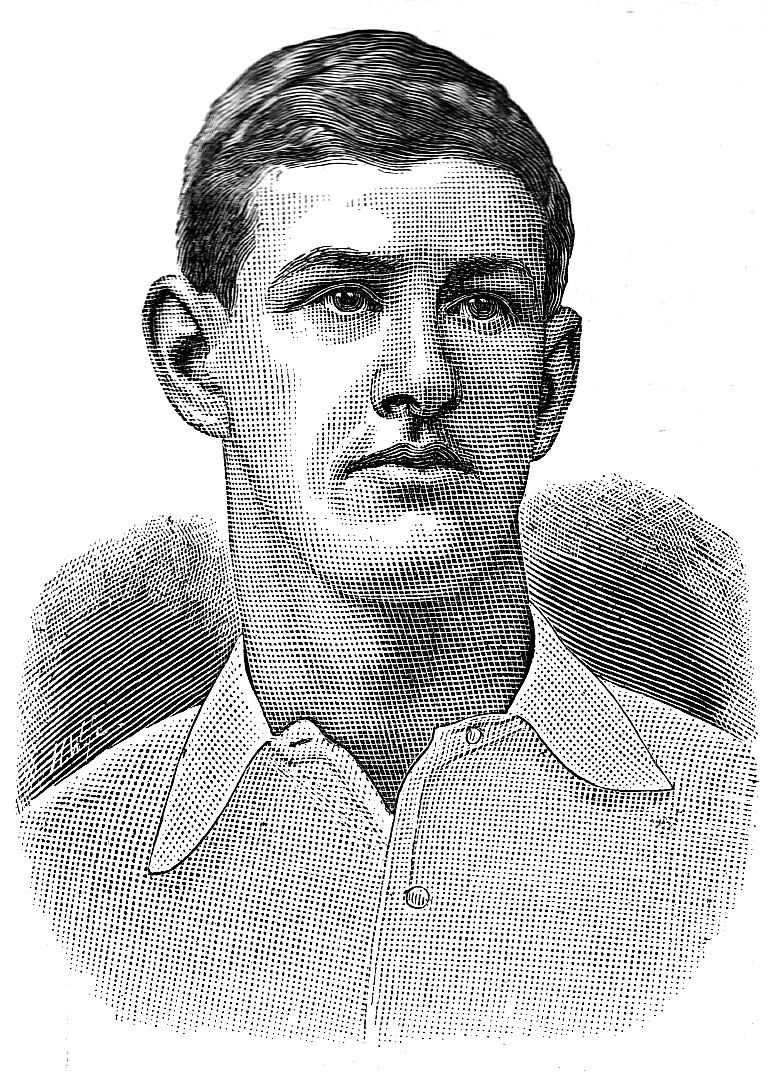
Sammy Woods

When he was aged 16, Woods' father decided to send him and his younger brother, Harris, to complete their education in England. Both boys were sent to Silwood House in Tunbridge Wells, Kent, a preparatory school. While at the school, Woods played for the town cricket club, and by the end of the season he was seventh in the published batting averages, with a top-score of 42 not out. He joined Brighton College in August 1884, and after playing a couple of cricket matches, the weather turned and the football season began. For Woods, whose Australian upbringing had consisted of cricket in the summer and rugby in the winter, the realisation that 'soccer' was played at the school was one made with some dismay. After only a few weeks though, he was playing in goal for both the school and the Sussex county football team.

His newly discovered prowess at soccer did not detract from his cricketing skills. The two summers in which Woods played for Brighton College were strong ones for the school, of the 23 matches they played, only 2 were lost. Alongside the Woods brothers were a number of other players who would go on to appear in county cricket; George Cotterill and George Wilson both played for Sussex, while Leslie Gay made one Test appearance for England in addition to representing Hampshire and Somerset. Woods topped the bowling averages in both his years at the school; in the first he claimed 59 wickets at an average just over eight, figures which he improved upon during his second year when he took 78 wickets at an average of 7.3. His college reports commented much more favourably on his sporting achievements than his academic ones, praising his batting, bowling and fielding alike.

The highlight of Woods' time at Brighton College was during a schools match against Lancing College. Playing away from home at the West Sussex school, Woods claimed 8 wickets for 17 in the first-innings, with all his victims being bowled, and followed this with 6 for 10 in the second-innings, five of the wickets bowled, and the other caught and bowled. On another occasion playing for the College's first eleven, Woods hit the stumps eight times in eight balls, but only claimed three wickets. After three successive no-balls hit, he bowled an opponent with the fourth ball (the first legal ball of the over), hit the leg stump without dislodging a bail with the fifth, took successive wickets with the sixth and seventh, and then once again hit the stumps without disturbing the bails with the eighth. This was not the only time on which Woods hit the stumps without removing the bails: in an interview a few years later, he recalls a match against Dulwich College in which he "[hit] the leg stump – and [hit] it hard – three times in one over, without knocking the bails off", each ball then went for four byes.

During his time at the college, Woods developed a slower ball after watching George Lohmann bowling against Sussex. Woods claimed that after practising the delivery for hours, he took a wicket with the first one he ever bowled, dismissing GG Hearne caught and bowled in a match against the Marylebone Cricket Club and Ground. Woods left Brighton College in 1886, aged 19, and shortly after, in August of the same year, he made his first-class cricket debut. Playing for GN Wyatt's XI against the touring Australians, Woods opened the bowling in both innings for the English side which was termed a 'South of England XI'. Woods made scores of 21 and 11 with the bat, and took 2/45 and 0/40 bowling. He claimed that he strained his side trying to bowl too fast, and would have done better otherwise.

=== Somerset: Learning business habits ===
After completing his time at Brighton College, Woods moved to Bridgwater where a friend of his father's helped to find him a job as a bank clerk. Woods reflected in his reminiscences that his father wanted him to "learn business habits" before he went to university. He soon became a key figure in the town's sport, playing for both the cricket and rugby teams. His performances on the cricket field drew the attention of the county club, and late during the 1886 season, Woods made his first appearance for Somerset County Cricket Club. Somerset were not at the time a first-class county, and Woods travelled up to Edgbaston, Birmingham to play Warwickshire, who similarly lacked first-class status. He failed in both batting innings, collecting a pair, but claimed twelve wickets; 7/23 in the first-innings and 5/34 in the second. His performance was praised in the Somerset County Gazette and in the Sussex Daily News; the latter publication noting that many had "anticipated or hoped that he would ultimately render good service to Sussex."

He continued to play for Somerset in 1887, generally batting as part of the lower order. He collected ten wickets against the Marylebone Cricket Club during this time. His work experience at the bank ended when an inspector noticed that the books were not balancing; which Woods was happy to explain was due to him taking a sovereign from time to time to buy stamps. After losing this job, he paid a surveyor to teach him the trade, but after an afternoon of the training, his teacher ran off with the money and soon committed suicide, bringing that to a halt.

== Cambridge University ==
=== First year ===
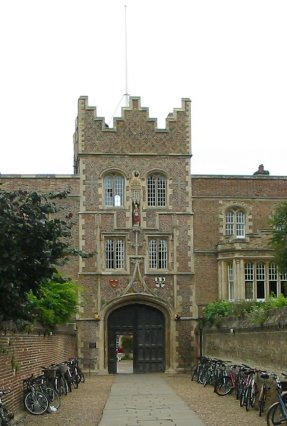
The Gatehouse of Jesus College, Cambridge, where Woods spent four years.

Woods entered Jesus College, Cambridge in 1888 and soon became a vibrant part of the social community. He joined port wine and oyster clubs, (known as Rhadegund and the Natives respectively) and played both cricket and rugby during his time at the university. He had also applied to Oxford University, who had turned him down, not realising his sporting abilities. He made his debut for the university at Fenner's in May 1888, claiming his first five-wicket haul in first-class cricket when he bowled four members of CI Thornton's XI, and had another one caught. Despite his wickets, he was relatively expensive, and the visiting side beat Cambridge easily. A week later, Woods improved on his performance against a 'Gentlemen of England' side which was also captained by Thornton, and claimed seven wickets in the first innings and another five in the second innings, top-scoring with the bat for Cambridge in-between, to help the university to a six wicket victory. This match also saw Woods take the only first-class hat-trick of his career.

He continued to bowl effectively for the university side, claiming another twelve wickets during a match against Yorkshire, nine of the twelve being bowled. He topped both the batting and the bowling averages for Cambridge during his first year, and gained his Blue in cricket, claiming six wickets in Oxford University's only innings of a match that was drawn, due to rain, with Cambridge the better of the two sides. In Geoffrey Bolton's History of the O.U.C.C., the author offers the opinion that the Cambridge side relied on the bowling of Woods, and although the rain initially softened the ground too much for his fast bowling, "when it had dried, he was irresistible." He also gained a Blue in rugby union, despite breaking his collarbone in an early game for the university. He also gained colours for Jesus College in both rugby and soccer. During his first year at Cambridge, Woods made his first appearances in the Gentlemen v Players fixture, representing the Gentlemen at both Lord's and The Oval in early July. In the first of the two matches, he claimed five wickets in each innings to help secure the Gentlemen a narrow five run victory. He collected another five wickets in the first innings of the match at The Oval, but could not prevent the Players achieving an innings victory, scoring a duck in the first innings and six runs in the second.

=== Test debut ===
During 1888, the sixth Australian team formed and travelled to England to contest three Tests and over 30 first-class matches. The squad was considered to be relatively weak, particularly in the batting, where only four players had any experience of English conditions. H.S Altham described them as leaving Australia "amid a chorus of gloomy prophecy". In his reminiscences, W. G. Grace expressed his disappointment at George Giffen and Harry Moses, who he rated as Australia's best players, not travelling with the team, and also noted that they missed the bowling of Fred Spofforth. Sammy Jones, an all-rounder from Sydney, fell ill with smallpox early during the tour, and due to the Australians only having a thirteen-man squad, Woods was invited into the tourists squad. His debut for Australia was made just two days after the conclusion of the second of his appearances for the Gentlemen, and was in the first Test of the series. Woods scored 18 and 3 batting from number six, and claimed one wicket during the first innings; the only wicket taken by Australia that did not fall to either Charlie Turner or John Ferris during the match. The match was notable for having the lowest aggregate number of runs scored in a Test match; Australia scored 116 and 60, while England made 53 and 62, totalling 291 runs. The record stood until 1932 when South Africa and Australia totalled less, but remains the second lowest aggregate.

Woods appeared against the Australians shortly thereafter, playing for 'Cambridge University Past and Present', but rejoined them for matches against Yorkshire and Surrey, the latter of which drew his best performance for the Australians, when he claimed four wickets, over a third of his total for the side. He claimed two wickets in each of the other two Test matches, but failed to reach double figures when batting in any innings. Australia lost both matches, granting England a 2–1 series victory. Grace observed that "neither with bat nor ball did Mr. S. M. J. Woods give promise of the sterling qualities of which he proved himself the possessor as years went on. Woods, in his reminiscences, only provides a paragraph on his time playing for the Australians, and concentrates mainly on the first-ball duck he made in the match at Old Trafford, Manchester. These three Test appearances for Australia were the only he made for his native country; he was invited to play for them again when they toured England in 1890, but had to decline due to injury. In 1889, Woods was named by Wisden Cricketers' Almanack as one of the "Six Great Bowlers of the Year" due to his performances for Cambridge and Australia. His bowling is described in the piece as being "very fast right-hand, now and then sending in a good yorker."

=== Second year ===
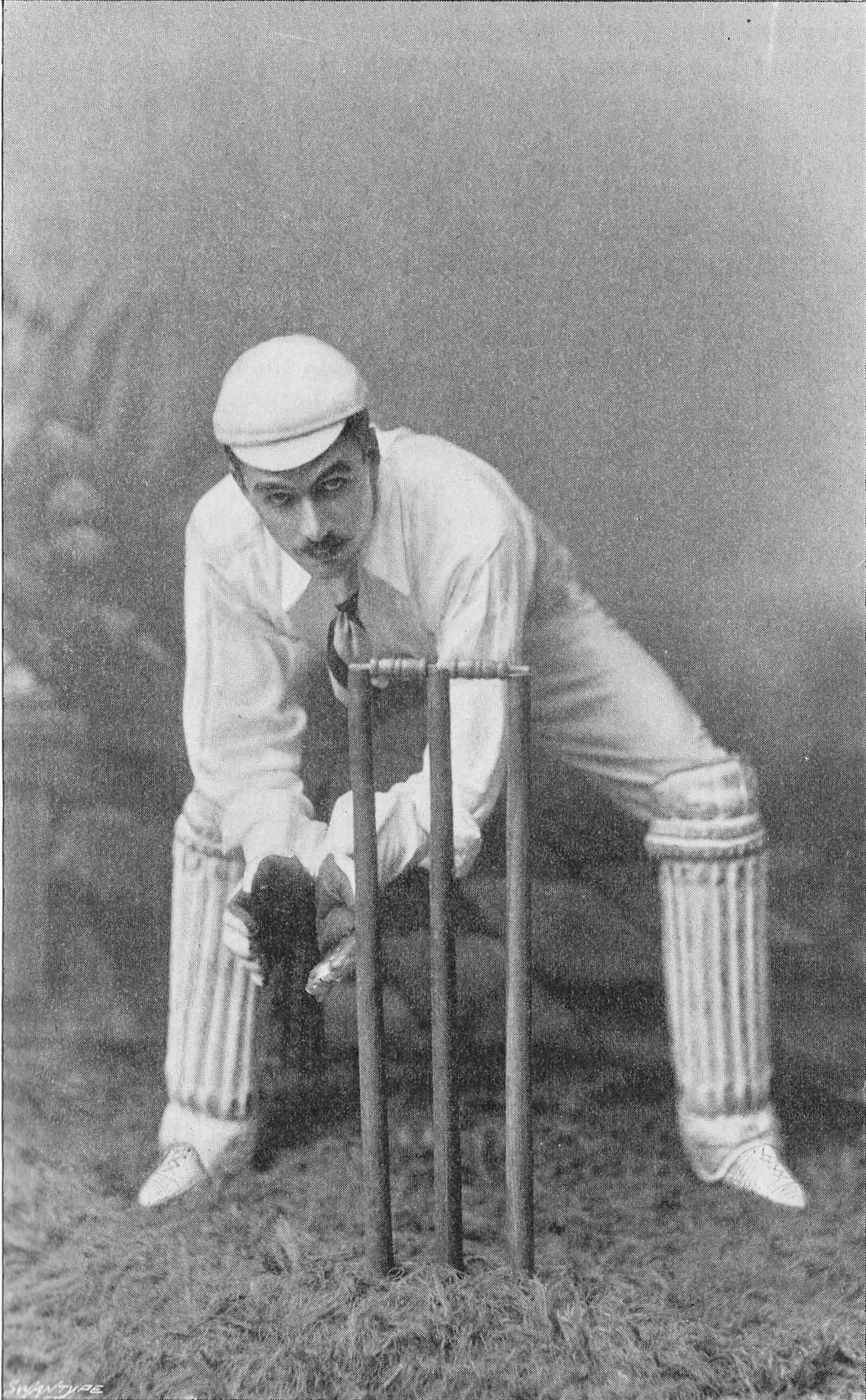
Woods formed a close friendship with Gregor MacGregor while at Cambridge.

In his second year at Cambridge, Woods continued his good bowling form from the previous season. He picked up five first innings wickets in his second match of the year, against the Marylebone Cricket Club, and in his next match a couple of day later, achieved his best bowling analysis in an innings to that point, claiming eight wickets against AJ Webbe's XI. He claimed another eleven wickets in the match against Yorkshire, taking five in the first innings and six in the second. Despite his wicket taking, Cambridge only won three of their seven first-class encounters in the run-up to facing Oxford, and the last of those came without Woods in the side. Nevertheless, they entered the fixture with better results than Oxford, who had lost six of their seven matches. Woods proved one of the deciding factors, claiming eleven wickets in the match, of which seven were bowled, and two were in combination with wicket-keeper Gregor MacGregor. Cambridge opening batsman Henry Mordaunt scored 127 in the match, and they secured an innings victory, requiring just two of the three allocated days.

The partnership which MacGregor and Woods forged during their time at Cambridge was noted by Bolton, who commented that "the two most successful Cambridge bowlers, Steel and Woods, were partnered by their two greatest wicket-keepers, Alfred Lyttelton and MacGregor." The pair shared a room together at Jesus College for two years, and on the field MacGregor proved himself capable of standing up to the wicket against Woods' bowling. Teammate Digby Jephson described their partnership as having "machine-like precision ... the faster Sam bowled, the nearer the sticks stood Mac."

After the conclusion of the university term, Woods played five further five-class fixtures, as well as a number of matches for Somerset. He performed well, but without much note in the two Gentlemen v Players fixtures in London, claiming three wickets in an innings twice, but both games resulted in victories for the Players. Four appearances for Somerset in August brought him more wickets, although the cricket was not first-class; he took five wickets in an innings three times, and totalled 33 wickets in the matches.^{[b]} He continued this wicket-taking form into his next two matches, both first-class, taking seven wickets in the second innings against I Zingari for the Gentlemen of England, aggregating eleven wickets in the match, and a few days later he claimed ten wickets in a match for the Marylebone Cricket Club against Yorkshire. He completed his second full season of first-class cricket with 74 wickets, at a bowling average of 16.74, roughly equivalent to his figure from the previous season.

=== Third year ===
Woods took on the captaincy of the university side during his third year, a role he had taken up twice before in 1889. In the first match of the season, he put in the best bowling display of his career; in his third annual match against CI Thornton's XI, Woods took five wickets in the first innings, and after his teammates had built a 62 run lead, he then proceeded to claim all ten of the opposition's wickets in the second innings, bowling seven of them. His figures of ten wickets for 69 runs were his career best in an innings. Woods was troubled by strains throughout the summer of 1890, and so despite playing as many matches as the previous season, he bowled over 30% fewer deliveries. When he did bowl, he was still effective, claiming 59 wickets at an average of 13.13, his best during an English season. In the matches leading up to the fixture against Oxford, Woods' Cambridge side won three, loss three and drew one of their seven games, and were considered to be a stronger side than their rivals. Rain prevented any play on the first day, and the soft conditions did not favour Woods' bowling. He picked up four wickets in each innings, but more significantly, Oxford were restricted to 42 in their first innings. Cambridge did not manage to score any quicker in their reply, but did bat for longer open up a lead of 55 runs. An improved display from Oxford in the second innings left Cambridge requiring 54 runs to win, which they reached with an hour of the match remaining.

During 1890, Somerset played thirteen 'second-class' fixtures, and remained undefeated for the whole season. Woods, due to his commitments at Cambridge and his injuries, only appeared in three of these matches. In the matches in which he did play, Woods made a significant impact: he claimed seven wickets in the first innings against Leicestershire, and in total in the three matches for the county, he took 24 wickets. In late August, playing for the Gentlemen of England against I Zingari at the Scarborough Festival, Woods claimed 12 wickets in the match, opening the bowling alongside W. G. Grace.

=== Fourth year ===
Woods and Stanley Jackson took the majority of wickets for Cambridge during the year, with Woods at his deadliest against Surrey in a two-day match in the middle of June. Though he bowled typically expensively, he claimed seven wickets in each innings, bowling nine men, helping Cambridge to a 19 run victory. He also top-scored with the bat for Cambridge in their second innings, hitting 27 runs. According to Bolton, Cambridge once again had a superior side in the University Match, but despite this strength, they very nearly lost the contest. Their strong batting line-up reached 210, which Bolton claims "could not be called a formidable score." In Oxford's innings, Woods bowled at what is claimed to be the quickest of his career, collecting seven wickets. Oxford were all out for 108, and MacGregor, captaining Cambridge, enforced the follow on. Oxford batted better in their second innings, but Cambridge only required 90 runs to win to match. A combination of nerves and poor light resulted in Cambridge collapsing, and when MacGregor was dismissed, only two wickets remained with the scores level. Woods, who had not been ready to bat, ran to the wicket without pads or gloves, and hit the first ball he was delivered for a boundary to long-on. Woods led the Cambridge bowling averages in each of the four seasons that he played at the university, and in 28 first-class matches for the side he claimed 190 wickets at an average of 14.93, taking five wickets in an innings on 19 occasions, and ten wickets in a match seven times. In contrast to his sporting excellence, he struggled academically, and left Cambridge without a degree.

== County cricket ==
=== Entry into County Championship ===
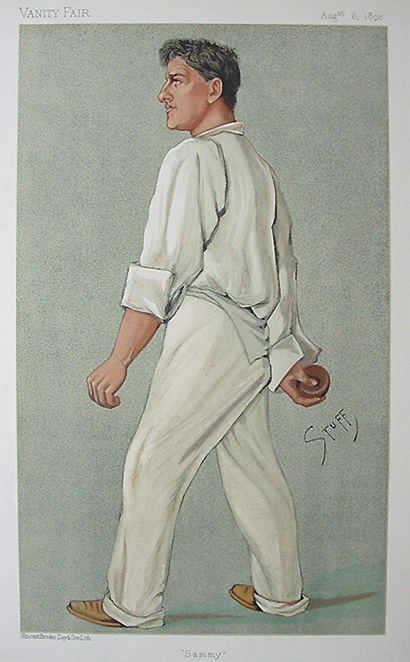
Woods caricature by "Stuff" in Vanity Fair, 1892

After Somerset's achievements in the previous season, they were granted first-class status and admission to the County Championship in 1891. This resulted in Woods playing more first-class cricket than in any previous season. He continued to bowl well throughout the season, and finished as Somerset's leading wicket taker in the Championship in 1891, claiming 72 of his 134 wickets for the county. He took ten wickets, and scored a half-century in the match against Yorkshire at Park Avenue, Bradford, and in so doing reached 100 first-class wickets in a season for the first time. Later in the same month, Woods opened the Somerset bowling alongside Ted Tyler against Gloucestershire. The pair claimed five wickets each, bowling Somerset's local rivals out for 25 runs from just 14.2 overs. The total was the lowest score Gloucestershire had made in an innings to that point, and remains their third lowest total. Woods claimed a further three wickets in Gloucestershire's second innings, and Somerset completed an innings victory on day two of the match.

Lord Hawke led the first of his cricketing tours following the conclusion of the 1891 English cricket season, taking a small party of English amateurs to play eight matches in North America. The first match of the trip was a first-class contest against the Gentlemen of Philadelphia, and the tourists lost by eight wickets. Woods blamed the defeat on being too soon after arriving, claiming the team "had hardly found our land-legs." The loss was considered something of an embarrassment to English cricket, and prompted a number of letters to be written to Lord Hawke expressing dismay at the result. Wisden primarily attributed the loss to the poor performance of Woods, whose four wickets came at an expense of 124. He fared significantly better in the second match, having apparently found his 'land-legs'. He collected 15 wickets for 86 runs against the same opponents, and the visitors won by four wickets. A third, deciding, match was proposed between the two sides, but could not be fit into the schedule. The remainder of the matches on the tour were not first-class, and were rarely eleven-a-side contests. Woods collected numerous wickets during these matches, and made significant totals with the bat on a couple of occasions, scoring 92 against 'All New York', and 54 in the last match, against 'Eastern Ontario'.

- Leading wicket-taker in 1892

=== Captaincy ===
- Became captain in 1894 following resignation of Hewett.
- Longest serving captain, staying in the role until 1906.

=== Tests for England in South Africa ===
- Three test appearances in 1896 for England during tour of South Africa.

=== Batting for Somerset ===
- Somerset's leading run-scorer in 1897 and 1899.

== Playing style ==
=== Bowling ===
In an appreciation included as a foreword to Woods' reminiscences, Pelham Warner described Woods as being "at that time one of the great fast bowlers of the world." Warner was referring to a match playing in 1890, when Woods was near the peak of his bowling. Warner was not the only one to rate Woods so highly, he was selected as one of the "Six Great Bowlers of the Year" by Wisden in 1889 for his performances in the previous season. He did not spend long at this peak though; he averaged below twenty in each of his first five full seasons, from 1888 until 1892, but did not manage the feat again during an English season. When he was at his best, C. B. Fry described Woods as "one of the best fast bowlers of all time". During his early years of first-class cricket, Woods focussed on bowling as quickly as possible, often sacrificing accuracy to achieve this. He soon developed into a more accurate and tactical bowler, including variety intentionally. The slower ball that Woods developed after watching George Lohmann became a vital part of his attack, and Warner believed it was this ball, and his ability to disguise it, that was "what made him a really great bowler". Wisden praised his yorker, while he was also known to bowl occasional bouncers, and even a beamer, and though some claimed these were intentional, Warner insisted otherwise. Woods was described by Grace as having "a high action". During the mid-1890s, Woods lost some of his pace, most likely burnt out from bowling long spells at his quickest during his years at Cambridge University.

== Rugby career ==
When Woods moved to Bridgwater in 1886 after completing his time at Brighton College, he almost immediately began playing for the town's rugby team. He described his first two seasons with the club as being wonderful, especially 1887, in which Bridgwater only lost one match, the last of the season against Exeter. He began his time at the club as a three-quarters back, and was soon called into the Somerset side for their first tour of the north of England. He recounts that during their match against Lancashire, he started at fullback, but after making a number of mistakes, moved to three-quarters. From this position he scored a dropped goal which helped to turn the match around, and thanks to two tries from his teammates, Somerset won. He selected to play for the South in 1888, and although England did not compete internationally that year due to disputes between the national boards, Woods was disappointed not to be chosen as part of the "imaginary XV". At Cambridge, he gained his Blue, competing in the Varsity Match in each of 1888, 1889 and 1900.

Woods played over 30 times for Somerset, and captained the county between 1893 and 1896. Woods was often a guest of the Hancock family, and appeared a number of times for Wiveliscombe, for whom seven of the ten Hancock brothers also appeared. One of these brothers, Froude Hancock, played for Blackheath, travelling up to London and back each weekend to appear for them. Woods joined him on occasion, and soon became an irregular player, appearing for the side throughout the early 1890s. Around the same time, Woods became one of the founding members of the Barbarians, and served on the club's committee for some time.

His England debut came in 1890, appearing against Wales at Dewsbury. Woods was one of eight England debutants in the match, in which he played as a forward. Wales won the match by a single try. He played in both of England's other two 1890 Home Nations Championship matches, both of which were won by England, who shared the championship with Scotland. He played all three matches again in 1891. He captained England for the first time in 1892, leading his adopted country to a 7–0 victory over Ireland, kicking a goal. He captained them again in 1893, but took on the captaincy on a more permanent basis in 1895, taking charge of the team for all three Home Nations matches. He scored his only international try in England's opening match of the 1895 competition, during a 14–6 victory over Wales. England won the second match, against Ireland at Lansdowne Road, but lost the final match of the tournament against Scotland – England's only loss with Woods as captain.

=== Style of play ===
Playing as either a back or a forward, Woods was praised primarily for his dribbling, part of the game which he felt should be utilised more often, especially by the pack during a ruck, or following a scrum. Woods was described by W. G. Grace as being "not a good scrimmager", but the England pack during his captaincy was considered one of the country's greatest for decades after. He was known for his strong tackling, described by an 1892 publication, Football, the Rugby Union Game, as "exceedingly severe", while Gilbert Jessop joked that an opponent may prefer to be hit by a motor-car than tackled by Woods in a close match.

== World War I ==
Woods served initially as a temporary lieutenant in the Royal Warwickshire Fusiliers before transferring to the Devon Regiment in 1916. In 1917 he was transferred to the Labour Corps. He was forced to resign his commission on 14 March 1919 due to ill-health and was given the substantive rank of captain.

== Later life ==
He remained a very popular and well-known figure in Somerset even after his cricket-playing days were long over. When he died, Taunton was in a state of mourning. R. C. Robertson-Glasgow wrote of him: "If you wanted to know Taunton, you walked round it with Sam Woods on a summer morning before the match. Sam was Somerset's godfather."

== See also ==
- List of cricketers who have played for more than one international team
- List of cricket and rugby union players

== Notes ==
a. Woods played three Tests for Australia and three for England. His best batting and bowling figures were both for England.
b. For individual match scorecards of Woods' appearances for Somerset in August 1889 see

== Bibliography ==
- Bolton, Geoffrey (1962). History of the O.U.C.C. (First ed.). Oxford: Holywell Press Ltd.
- Foot, David (1986). Sunshine, Sixes and Cider: The History of Somerset Cricket (1986 ed.). Newton Abbot, Devon: David & Charles. ISBN 0-7153-8890-8.
- Grace, W. G. (1899). "W.G.", cricketing reminiscences and personal recollections (First ed.). London: James Bowden.
- Jiggens, Clifford (1997). Sammy: The Sporting Life of S.M.J. Woods (First ed.). Bristol: Sansom & Company. ISBN 1-900178-85-0.
- Roebuck, Peter (1991). From Sammy to Jimmy: The Official History of Somerset County Cricket Club (1991 ed.). London: Partridge Press. ISBN 1-85225-085-2.
- Woods, Sammy (1925). My Reminiscences (First ed.). London: Chapman and Hall.

Sporting positions
Preceded by Herbie Hewett	Somerset County Cricket Captain; 1894–1906	Succeeded by Lionel Palairet
