= Dick Pougher =

English cricketer (1865–1926)

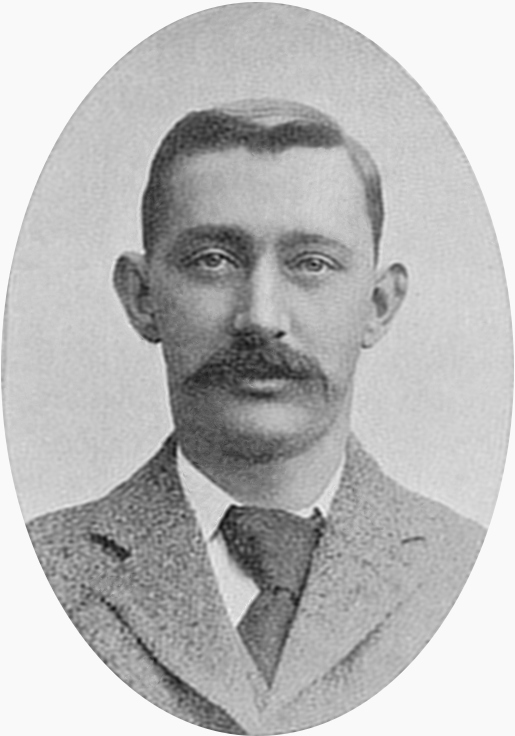
- Pougher in 1897

Personal information
- Full name: Arthur Dick Pougher
- Born: 19 April 1865; Humberstone, Leicestershire
- Died: 20 May 1926 (aged 61); Aylestone Park, Leicester
- Batting: Right-handed
- Bowling: Right-arm fast medium
- Role: All-rounder

International information
- National side: England
- Only Test (cap 80): 19 March 1892 v South Africa

Domestic team information
- Years: Team
- 1885–1901: Leicestershire
- 1886–1896: North
- 1886–1896: Players
- 1887–1902: Marylebone Cricket Club

Career statistics
Competition	Test	First-class
Matches	1	163
Runs scored	17	4,555
Batting average	17.00	18.59
100s/50s	0/0	5/13
Top score	17	114
Balls bowled	105	25,881
Wickets	3	535
Bowling average	8.66	19.02
5 wickets in innings	0	31
10 wickets in match	0	7
Best bowling	3/26	9/34
Catches/stumpings	2/–	98/–
- Source: CricketArchive, 28 October 2022

Arthur Dick Pougher (/pʌfɜːr/; 19 April 1865 – 20 May 1926) was an English professional cricketer and umpire who played for Leicestershire County Cricket Club from 1885 to 1901, and in one Test match for England in 1891–92. He was born at Humberstone, Leicestershire and died at Aylestone Park, Leicester.

Pougher was an all-rounder who played in 163 first-class matches. He was a right-handed batsman and scored 4,555 runs at an average of 18.59 runs per completed innings with a highest score of 114 as one of five centuries. He was a right arm fast medium bowler who could also bowl off breaks. He took 535 wickets at an average of 19.02 runs per wicket. He took five wickets in an innings 31 times with best figures of 9/34. He achieved ten wickets in a match seven times with a best return of 14/89. He held 98 career catches.

== Playing career ==
=== Tours ===
Pougher went on two overseas tours but played in only one Test match for England, which was against South Africa at Cape Town in 1891–92. He was awarded two benefits: one by Leicestershire in 1900 and one by Middlesex in 1910.

=== Five for none versus the 1896 Australians ===
Pougher's Wisden obituary recalls his "most memorable feat" when he played for Marylebone Cricket Club (MCC) against the 1896 Australian tourists at Lord's on 11 June 1896. MCC had batted first and were all out for 219. The pitch was deteriorating after heavy rain and the Australian batsmen had to work hard against the bowling of J. T. Hearne and William Attewell to reach 18/3 in the first seventeen overs. At that point, W. G. Grace, the MCC captain, decided to replace Attewell with Pougher.

From his first delivery, Pougher caught and bowled Jim Kelly, taking the catch with his right hand. Pougher then bowled Clem Hill with a delivery that "bewildered" the batsman. Hugh Trumble survived the three remaining balls of the five-ball over without scoring so Pougher had a double-wicket maiden. Jack Hearne continued bowling from the other end. Pougher's second over, again bowling to Trumble, was another maiden but without a wicket falling. With the second ball of his next over, Hearne bowled Frank Iredale and the Australians were then 18/6 (effectively 18/7 because George Giffen had been taken ill and was out of the match). Hearne had taken 4/4 in eleven overs. Pougher came on for his third over and finished the innings at 18/9 by bowling Trumble with his second delivery, then bowling Charles Eady with his third and, off the fifth and last ball of the over, having Tom McKibbin caught by George Davidson.

Pougher took five wickets in fifteen deliveries (including three wickets in four deliveries) without conceding a run. In scorecard notation, the sequence of his deliveries was:

ww...|.....|.ww.w (w = wicket taken; . = no run scored; | = end of over)

Having been dismissed for only 18, the Australians were obliged to bat again and reached close of play with 25/2, still 176 runs behind. On the second day, they were all out for 183 after a good partnership of 112 between Joe Darling (76) and Eady (42). Pougher bowled 28 overs in the second innings, including 15 maidens, but took no more wickets and his return was 0/33. Jack Hearne, however, took 9/73 for a match analysis of 13/77.

== Umpiring career ==
Pougher umpired 49 first-class matches. All but two of these were between 1903 and 1909; the exceptions were one match in Australia in 1888–89 and Leicestershire's game against the West Indians in 1923. He also officiated in Yorkshire's game against Kent in July 1904, but this match is not included in the total, as he and fellow umpire William Shrewsbury (brother of Arthur) declared the match void after the first day because of illegal changes made to the pitch.

== Later years ==
After retiring from cricket, Pougher kept the Old Cricket Ground Hotel at Aylestone Park, Leicester, where he died in 1926, aged 61.
