= Henry Murray-Anderdon =

English cricket administrator

Henry Edward Murray-Anderdon (8 December 1848 – 11 December 1922) was a cricket administrator who served as the secretary and guiding spirit in the early days of Somerset County Cricket Club and later as the club president.

Murray-Anderdon became honorary secretary of Somerset after the club had fallen out of first-class cricket in 1885; in five years, he had established it on a sounder financial footing, recruited illustrious players such as Sammy Woods, overseen the leasing of (and later the acquisition of) the current County Ground at Taunton, and, in 1891, seen the team restored to first-class status in the newly organised County Championship. He remained as honorary secretary until 1910 and then became Life President from 1915 until his death.

Murray-Anderdon was the son of the rector of Chislehurst, Kent, the Rev Francis Murray, and his wife Fanny Catherine Anderdon. He was educated at Marlborough College where he did not make the cricket team. He inherited a large house at Henlade, near Taunton, from an uncle in 1873 and, changing his surname to Murray-Anderdon, thereafter lived the life of a country gentleman and man of activities. "He had a commanding, aristocratic manner," says one history of Somerset cricket.

From 1882 to 1885, Somerset played sufficient fixtures against other county sides for its matches to be regarded as first-class, but in the last of these seasons it was beset by a poor playing record and amateurish organisation: only nine players turned out in the match against Hampshire, and first-class status was withdrawn after 1885. Murray-Anderdon became secretary of the club at this point: he proved to be "a fine administrator and his job was to shake the place up". Somerset took a 19-year lease on the County Ground at Taunton and bought it outright in 1896, and Murray-Anderdon instituted the policy, pursued well into the second half of the 20th century, of trawling the universities and further afield for potential playing recruits who, as amateurs, would not normally need payment; among his early successes was the Australian, Sammy Woods. In 1890, as a second-class county, Somerset won 12 out of 13 fixtures with the bigger teams and were re-admitted to first-class status in 1891, including, by that time, a properly constituted County Championship.

Murray-Anderdon remained as unpaid honorary secretary into the early years of the 20th century, working for most of that period alongside Woods, who was described as "captain and secretary", a frequent fiction in amateur times that enabled Woods to be paid (for the secretarial duties) while retaining amateur status as a player; Murray-Anderdon was also a member of various MCC committees.

Although "cricket, along with fishing, was his passion", Murray-Anderdon also involved himself in other worthy activities. He was president of the Somerset Football Association. In 1896, he was elected as one of two representatives for the Diocese of Bath and Wells on a trust fund for distressed clergy.
