= Somerset County Gazette =

Weekly newspaper in Somerset, England

- Type: Weekly newspaper
- Format: Tabloid
- Owner: Newsquest
- Editor: vacancy
- Founded: 1836
- Political alignment: None
- Language: English
- Headquarters: Tangier 2, Tangier Central, Taunton, Somerset, TA1 4AS
- Circulation: 5,157 (as of 2023)
- Website: somersetcountygazette.co.uk

The Somerset County Gazette is a weekly tabloid newspaper in Somerset, England.

== History ==
It was founded in 1836, and is now owned by Newsquest.

The newspaper was re-launched in November 2016, under the County Gazette masthead, with the tagline 'Somerset's heartbeat', losing the full Somerset County Gazette logo and web address from the front page.

The County Gazette's sports coverage received a Highly Commended honour for Outstanding Newspaper Coverage at the 2018 Domestic Cricket Journalism Awards, which are organised by the England and Wales Cricket Board.

The newspaper, including editorial and advertising teams, is based in Taunton, Somerset. The Somerset County Gazette moved out of its historic offices close to Somerset County Cricket Club to new offices at Tangier Way, in February 2019.
