= List of Somerset County Cricket Club seasons =

This is an overview of the results achieved by Somerset County Cricket Club since their admission to first-class cricket in 1882.

== Key ==
Winners	Runners up	Promoted	Relegated	Disqualified

== Pre County Championship (1882–1885) ==
Season	P	W	L	D	Win%	Most runs		Most wickets		Notes
1882	8	1	6	1	12.50	Bill Fowler	361	Arnold Fothergill	26	
1883	7	1	5	1	14.29	Edward Sainsbury	335	Arnold Fothergill	27	
1884	6	1	5	0	16.67	Stephen Newton	218	Edward Bastard	24	
1885	6	1	5	0	16.67	Octavius Radcliffe	323	Edward Bastard	25	

== County Championship (1891–present) ==
Season	County Championship												Notes
Season	P	W	L	D	T	A	Pts	Pos	Most runs		Most wickets		Notes
1891	12	5	6	1	0	0	−1	5th	Lionel Palairet	560	Sammy Woods	72	
1892	16	8	5	3	0	0	3	3rd	Herbie Hewett	1,047	Sammy Woods	85	
1893	16	4	8	4	0	0	−4	8th	Herbie Hewett	669	Ted Tyler	86	
1894	16	6	7	3	0	0	−1	6th	Lionel Palairet	748	Ted Tyler	88	
1895	18	6	8	3	0	1	−2	8th	Lionel Palairet	1,159	Ted Tyler	114	
1896	16	3	7	6	0	0	−4	11th	Lionel Palairet	1,204	Ted Tyler	73	
1897	16	3	9	4	0	0	−6	11th	Sammy Woods	634	Ted Tyler	85	
1898	16	1	10	5	0	0	−9	11th	Lionel Palairet	1,028	Ted Tyler	83	
1899	16	2	8	6	0	0	−6	13th	Sammy Woods	1,110	Ted Tyler	60	
1900	16	4	11	1	0	0	−7	11th	Lionel Palairet	947	Beaumont Cranfield	62	
1901	18	4	10	3	0	1	−6	12th	Lionel Palairet	1,637	Beaumont Cranfield	102	
1902	18	7	7	4	0	0	0	7th	Lionel Palairet	819	Beaumont Cranfield	115	
1903	18	6	6	5	0	1	0	10th	Len Braund	793	Len Braund	95	
1904	18	5	11	2	0	0	−6	12th	Lionel Palairet	1,271	Beaumont Cranfield	71	
1905	18	1	10	7	0	0	−9	15th	Len Braund	976	Len Braund	60	
1906	18	4	10	4	0	0	−6	10th	Peter Randall Johnson	918	Len Braund	79	
1907	18	3	12	3	0	0	−10	14th	Lionel Palairet	761	Talbot Lewis	76	
1908	20	2	13	5	0	0	−11	16th	Len Braund	946	Talbot Lewis	80	
1909	16	4	7	5	0	0	−3	11th	Len Braund	832	Talbot Lewis	73	
1910	18	0	15	3	0	0	0	16th	Percy Hardy	700	Talbot Lewis	71	
1911	16	1	13	2	0	0	7	16th	John Daniell	654	Talbot Lewis	43	
1912	16	2	8	4	0	2	16	14th	Prince Bajana	575	Bill Greswell	96	
1913	16	2	11	3	0	0	17	16th	Len Braund	985	Jack White	93	
1914	20	3	16	0	0	1	15	15th	Len Braund	710	Jack White	83	
No competitive cricket was played between 1915 and 1918 due to the First World War.
1919	12	4	3	4	1	0	4	5th	Dudley Rippon	451	Jack White	86	
1920	20	7	10	3	0	0	39	10th	John Daniell	829	Jack White	129	
1921	22	8	11	3	0	0	44	10th	Peter Randall Johnson	961	Jack White	137	
1922	24	6	11	7	0	0	42	10th	Jack MacBryan	1,428	Jack White	146	
1923	24	9	11	4	0	0	47	9th	Jack MacBryan	1,507	Jack White	141	
1924	22	9	7	4	0	2	52	8th	Jack MacBryan	1,355	Jack White	135	
1925	26	3	15	6	0	0	29	15th	Jack White	793	Jack White	121	
1926	26	3	9	9	1	0	32.5	14th	Tom Young	1,177	Jack White	127	
1927	26	3	9	11	0	0	65	14th	Tom Young	1,196	Jack White	103	
1928	24	4	11	8	0	0	62	14th	George Hunt	965	Jack White	128	
1929	28	3	17	8	0	0	58	15th	Tom Young	1,128	Jack White	149	
1930	28	4	11	11	0	0	87	14th	Bunty Longrigg	1,351	Jack White	111	
1931	28	6	11	10	0	0	128	13th	Tom Young	1,166	Jack White	128	
1932	28	8	7	10	0	0	168	7th	Tom Young	967	Jack White	102	
1933	26	6	10	7	0	0	127	11th	Jack Lee	1,081	Arthur Wellard	103	
1934	24	3	10	11	0	0	78	15th	Frank Lee	1,576	Jack Lee	74	
1935	26	5	11	10	0	0	113	14th	Arthur Wellard	1,198	Arthur Wellard	97	
1936	26	9	10	5	0	0	162	7th	Harold Gimblett	1,364	Arthur Wellard	134	
1937	28	7	14	7	0	0	130	13th	Frank Lee	1,670	Arthur Wellard	138	
1938	28	10	9	6	0	0	144	7th	Frank Lee	2,015	Arthur Wellard	167	
1939	28	6	11	9	1	0	102	14th	Harold Gimblett	1,771	Bill Andrews	119	
No competitive cricket was played between 1940 and 1945 due to the Second World War.
1946	26	12	6	8	0	0	166	4th	Harold Gimblett	1,731	Arthur Wellard	106	
1947	26	8	12	6	0	0	100	11th	Harold Gimblett	1,505	Arthur Wellard	91	
1948	26	5	14	7	0	0	92	12th	Harold Gimblett	1,741	Horace Hazell	92	
1949	26	8	15	3	0	0	108	9th	Harold Gimblett	1,839	Horace Hazell	104	
1950	28	8	8	12	0	0	112	7th	Harold Gimblett	1,537	Johnny Lawrence	108	
1951	28	5	15	8	0	0	76	14th	Maurice Tremlett	2,018	Ellis Robinson	101	
1952	28	2	12	13	0	1	44	17th	Harold Gimblett	2,068	Johnny Lawrence	73	
1953	28	2	19	6	0	1	36	17th	Harold Gimblett	1,836	Johnny Lawrence	67	
1954	28	2	18	8	0	0	40	17th	Peter Wight	1,281	Johnny Lawrence	91	
1955	28	4	17	7	0	0	64	17th	Maurice Tremlett	1,830	Bryan Lobb	86	
1956	28	4	15	8	0	0	76	15th	Colin McCool	1,645	John McMahon	97	
1957	28	9	14	5	0	0	138	8th	Colin McCool	1,382	Bryan Lobb	88	
1958	28	12	9	7	0	0	175	3rd	Peter Wight	1,506	Brian Langford	116	
1959	28	8	13	7	0	0	130	12th	Peter Wight	1,799	Brian Langford	72	
1960	32	5	11	15	0	0	106	14th	Peter Wight	2,086	Brian Langford	99	
1961	32	10	15	7	0	0	162	10th	Bill Alley	2,532	Ken Palmer	113	
1962	32	12	7	13	0	0	190	6th	Graham Atkinson	1,951	Bill Alley	107	
1963	28	10	6	11	0	0	118	3rd	Graham Atkinson	1,363	Ken Palmer	121	
1964	28	8	8	8	0	0	96	8th	Bill Alley	1,295	Brian Langford	105	
1965	28	8	11	8	0	0	92	7th	Graham Atkinson	1,332	Fred Rumsey	94	
1966	28	13	7	7	0	0	156	3rd	Mervyn Kitchen	1,360	Brian Langford	111	
1967	28	5	7	14	0	0	120	8th	Roy Virgin	1,245	Ken Palmer	81	
1968	27	5	11	11	0	1	172	12th	Mervyn Kitchen	1,664	Fred Rumsey	72	
1969	24	1	9	14	0	0	96	17th	Mervyn Kitchen	1,267	Roy Palmer	60	
1970	24	5	10	9	0	0	176	13th	Roy Virgin	2,223	Tom Cartwright	86	
1971	24	7	4	13	0	0	209	7th	Roy Virgin	1,318	Tom Cartwright	96	
1972	20	4	2	14	0	0	145	11th	Brian Close	1,192	Tom Cartwright	93	
1973	20	7	2	11	0	0	159	10th	Brian Close	1,070	Tom Cartwright	88	
1974	20	6	4	10	0	0	181	5th	Viv Richards	1,154	Hallam Moseley	65	
1975	20	4	8	8	0	0	156	12th	Brian Close	1,214	Ian Botham	58	
1976	20	7	8	5	0	0	180	7th	Brian Rose	1,529	Ian Botham	60	
1977	21	6	4	11	0	1	194	4th	Viv Richards	2,090	Ian Botham	65	
1978	22	9	9	9	0	0	228	5th	Viv Richards	1,558	Ian Botham	58	
1979	21	5	1	15	0	1	171	8th	Brian Rose	1,270	Joel Garner	55	
1980	21	3	5	13	0	1	168	5th	Peter Denning	952	Colin Dredge	61	
1981	22	10	2	10	0	0	279	3rd	Viv Richards	1,718	Joel Garner	87	
1982	22	6	6	10	0	0	213	6th	Viv Richards	1,143	Vic Marks	63	
1983	24	3	7	14	0	0	180	10th	Peter Roebuck	1,235	Vic Marks	49	
1984	24	6	7	11	0	0	234	7th	Martin Crowe	1,769	Vic Marks	78	
1985	24	1	7	16	0	0	131	17th	Viv Richards	1,836	Vic Marks	67	
1986	23	3	7	13	0	0	152	16th	Peter Roebuck	1,261	Vic Marks	57	
1987	24	2	3	19	0	0	163	11th	Martin Crowe	1,627	Vic Marks	70	
1988	22	5	6	11	0	0	201	11th	Steve Waugh	1,286	Vic Marks	76	
1989	22	4	6	12	0	0	168	14th	Jimmy Cook	2,173	Adrian Jones	69	
1990	22	3	4	15	0	0	166	15th	Jimmy Cook	2,432	Adrian Jones	52	
1991	22	2	5	15	0	0	143	17th	Jimmy Cook	2,370	David Graveney	53	
1992	22	5	4	13	0	0	206	9th	Richard Harden	1,321	Andy Caddick	64	
1993	17	8	7	2	0	0	213	5th	Richard Harden	1,092	Mushtaq Ahmed	85	
1994	17	7	7	3	0	0	191	11th	Mark Lathwell	1,219	Andy Caddick	49	
1995	17	7	5	5	0	0	201	9th	Peter Bowler	1,483	Mushtaq Ahmed	92	
1996	17	5	6	6	0	0	197	11th	Shane Lee	1,300	Andy Caddick	65	
1997	17	3	3	11	0	0	183	12th	Robert Turner	946	Graham Rose	62	
1998	17	6	7	4	0	0	264	9th	Marcus Trescothick	726	Andy Caddick	105	
1999	17	6	4	7	0	0	263	4th	Jamie Cox	1,478	Andy Caddick	71	
2000	16	2	4	10	0	0	145	5th, Div 1	Peter Bowler	1,090	Steffan Jones	40	
2001	16	6	2	8	0	0	203	2nd, Div 1	Jamie Cox	1,264	Richard Johnson	62	
2002	16	1	7	8	0	0	126.75	8th, Div 1	Mike Burns	1,047	Matthew Bulbeck	53	
2003	16	4	8	4	0	0	157	7th, Div 2	Ian Blackwell	1,066	Nixon McLean	62	
2004	16	4	5	7	0	0	175	4th, Div 2	Peter Bowler	957	Andy Caddick	54	
2005	16	4	7	5	0	0	155	8th, Div 2	Ian Blackwell	1,065	Andy Caddick	52	
2006	16	3	9	4	0	0	140	9th, Div 2	Cameron White	1,190	Charl Willoughby	66	
2007	16	10	1	5	0	0	266	1st, Div 2	Marcus Trescothick	1,315	Andy Caddick	70	
2008	16	3	2	11	0	0	174	4th, Div 1	Marcus Trescothick	1,258	Charl Willoughby	49	
2009	16	3	1	12	0	0	182	3rd, Div 1	Marcus Trescothick	1,817	Charl Willoughby	54	
2010	16	6	2	8	0	0	214	2nd, Div 1	James Hildreth	1,440	Charl Willoughby	58	
2011	16	6	7	3	0	0	189	4th, Div 1	Marcus Trescothick	1,673	Steve Kirby	53	
2012	16	5	1	10	0	0	187	2nd, Div 1	Nick Compton	1,191	Peter Trego	50	
2013	16	3	5	8	0	0	146	6th, Div 1	Nick Compton	1,001	Alfonso Thomas	42	
2014	16	4	2	10	0	0	198	6th, Div 1	Marcus Trescothick	1,049	Alfonso Thomas	53	
2015	16	4	6	6	0	0	183	6th, Div 1	James Hildreth	1,390	Craig Overton	43	
2016	16	6	1	9	0	0	226	2nd, Div 1	Marcus Trescothick	1,239	Jack Leach	65	
2017	14	4	6	4	0	0	147	6th, Div 1	Steven Davies	775	Jack Leach	51	
2018	14	7	2	4	1	0	208	2nd, Div 1	James Hildreth	1,089	Lewis Gregory; Craig Overton	37	
2019	14	9	3	2	0	0	217	2nd, Div 1	Tom Abell	756	Lewis Gregory	51	
Due to the COVID-19 pandemic in 2020 the County Championship was replaced by a one-off Bob Willis Trophy.
2021	14	4	5	5	0	0	180.5	6th, Div 1	Tom Abell	711	Craig Overton	42	
2022	14	3	6	6	0	0	149	7th, Div 1	Tom Abell	1,039	Craig Overton	36	
2023	14	3	4	7	0	0	148	7th, Div 1	James Rew	1,086	Lewis Gregory	34	
2024	14	5	3	6	0	0	196	3rd, Div 1	Tom Lammonby	941	Jack Leach	45	
2025	14	4	3	7	0	0	181	3rd, Div 1	James Rew	1,053	Jack Leach	52	
2026	14	6	3	5	0	0	205	2nd, Div 1	Tom Abell	1,287	Craig Overton	53	

== Bob Willis Trophy (2020) ==
Season	Bob Willis Trophy												Notes
Season	P	W	L	D	T	A	Pts	Pos	Most runs		Most wickets		Notes
2020	6	4	0	2	0	0	97	Runner-up	Tom Lammonby	459	Craig Overton	30	

== One-day trophy (1963–present) ==
Season	Trophy					Notes
Season	Pos	Most runs		Most wickets		Notes
1963	1st Round	Brian Langford	56	Fred Rumsey	4	
1964	Quarter-final	Graham Atkinson	79	Geoff Hall	8	
1965	Quarter-final	Roy Virgin	91	Fred Rumsey	6	
1966	Semi-final	Mervyn Kitchen	154	Bill Alley	10	
1967	Runners up	Mervyn Kitchen	202	Roy Palmer	14	
1968	2nd Round	Roy Virgin	55	Fred Rumsey	2	
1969	1st Round	Tony Clarkson	30	Ken Palmer	4	
1970	Semi-final	Roy Virgin	220	Allan Jones	8	
1971	1st Round	Roy Virgin	105	Allan Jones	1	
1972	2nd Round	Mervyn Kitchen	116	Hallam Moseley	4	
1973	2nd Round	Peter Robinson	67	Allan Jones	2	
1974	Semi-final	Peter Denning	177	Hallam Moseley	8	
1975	2nd Round	Peter Denning	96	Hallam Moseley	6	
1976	2nd Round	Brian Close	69	Graham Burgess	2	
1977	Semi-final	Brian Rose	131	Joel Garner	10	
1978	Runners up	Viv Richards	361	Colin Dredge	10	
1979	Winners	Viv Richards	266	Joel Garner	17	
1980	1st Round	Brian Rose	38	Hugh Gore	3	
1981	2nd Round	Nigel Popplewell	57	Joel Garner	1	
1982	Quarter-final	Vic Marks	137	Joel Garner	7	
1983	Winners	Viv Richards	203	Joel Garner	14	
1984	Quarter-final	Peter Roebuck	200	Martin Crowe	6	
1985	Quarter-final	Viv Richards	107	Colin Dredge	7	
1986	2nd Round	Nigel Felton	73	Joel Garner	6	
1987	1st Round	Ricky Bartlett	56	Neil Mallender	2	
1988	2nd Round	Jon Hardy	112	Steve Waugh	4	
1989	2nd Round	Chris Tavaré	180	Vic Marks	4	
1990	2nd Round	Chris Tavaré	261	Roland Lefebvre	9	
1991	Quarter-final	Andy Hayhurst	154	Andy Hayhurst	8	
1992	2nd Round	Richard Harden	147	Andy Caddick	7	
1993	Semi-final	Nick Folland	160	Graham Rose	9	
1994	Quarter-final	Richard Harden	178	Andre van Troost	6	
1995	1st Round	Richard Harden	104	Jason Kerr	2	
1996	Quarter-final	Shane Lee	122	Andy Caddick	9	
1997	2nd Round	Simon Ecclestone	188	Mushtaq Ahmed	6	
1998	2nd Round	Mike Burns	113	Mushtaq Ahmed	7	
1999	Runners up	Piran Holloway	258	Paul Jarvis	10	
2000	4th Round	Marcus Trescothick	88	Peter Trego	2	
2001	Winners	Jamie Cox	167	Richard Johnson	9	
2002	Runners up	Peter Bowler	287	Steffan Jones	8	
2003	4th Round	Marcus Trescothick	120	Keith Parsons	4	
2004	3rd Round	Jamie Cox	136	Simon Francis	8	
2005	1st Round	Ian Blackwell	40	Simon Francis	3	
2006	Group stage	Matthew Wood	332	Andy Caddick	10	
2007	Group stage	Justin Langer	460	Charl Willoughby	11	
2008	Quarter-final	Justin Langer	274	Steffan Jones	13	
2009	Quarter-final	Marcus Trescothick	476	Alfonso Thomas	20	
2010	Runners up	James Hildreth	627	Alfonso Thomas	27	
2011	Runners up	Peter Trego	444	Steve Kirby	20	
2012	Group stage	Jos Buttler	289	Peter Trego	15	
2013	Semi-final	Peter Trego	745	Craig Meschede	22	
2014	Group stage	Peter Trego	314	Lewis Gregory	14	
2015	Group stage	Tom Cooper	359	Craig Overton	12	
2016	Semi-final	Jim Allenby	423	Lewis Gregory	17	
2017	Play-off	Dean Elgar	519	Craig Overton	16	
2018	Group stage	James Hildreth	438	Craig Overton	12	
2019	Winners	James Hildreth	457	Craig Overton	20	
2021	Group stage	Lewis Goldsworthy	381	Sonny Baker	10	
2022	Group stage	James Rew	307	Kasey Aldridge	13	
2023	Group stage	Andrew Umeed	613	Jack Brooks	8	
2024	Runners up	Andrew Umeed	492	Jack Leach	15	
2025	Semi-final	James Rew	438	Ben Green	16	
2026	Group stage	Tom Lammonby	547	Migael Pretorius	11	

== One-day league (1969–2009) ==
Season	League												Notes
Season	P	W	T	L	NR	A	Pts	Pos	Most runs		Most wickets		Notes
1969	16	5	0	10	0	1	21	16th	Greg Chappell	456	Graham Burgess	23	
1970	16	5	0	9	1	1	22	15th	Roy Virgin	376	Roy Palmer	21	
1971	16	9	0	5	1	1	38	5th	Brian Close	461	Allan Jones	25	
1972	16	8	0	7	0	1	33	7th	Brian Close	347	Graham Burgess	25	
1973	16	5	0	7	1	3	24	11th	Graham Burgess	262	Hallam Moseley	21	
1974	16	12	0	2	1	1	52	2nd	Brian Close	498	Bob Clapp	34	
1975	16	5	1	10	0	0	22	14th	Viv Richards	578	Hallam Moseley	23	
1976	16	10	0	6	0	0	40	2nd	Peter Denning	450	Ian Botham	24	
1977	16	6	0	8	1	1	28	9th	Viv Richards	545	Hallam Moseley	19	
1978	16	11	0	3	0	2	48	2nd	Viv Richards	527	Hallam Moseley	23	
1979	16	12	0	3	0	1	50	1st	Brian Rose	484	Joel Garner	16	
1980	16	11	0	5	0	0	44	2nd	Peter Denning	427	Hallam Moseley	27	
1981	16	11	0	5	0	0	44	2nd	Viv Richards	444	Joel Garner	27	
1982	16	8	0	8	0	0	32	9th	Peter Denning	502	Hallam Moseley	21	
1983	16	10	0	3	1	2	46	2nd	Peter Roebuck	456	Viv Richards	18	
1984	16	5	0	9	1	1	24	13th	Martin Crowe	457	Vic Marks	16	
1985	16	5	0	6	2	3	30	10th	Viv Richards	384	Joel Garner	13	
1986	16	8	0	6	2	0	36	6th	Peter Roebuck	405	Nick Taylor	19	
1987	16	8	0	4	3	1	40	4th	Jon Hardy	418	Adrian Jones	19	
1988	16	6	0	9	0	1	26	12th	Steve Waugh	534	Adrian Jones	18	
1989	16	7	1	8	0	0	30	10th	Jimmy Cook	556	Vic Marks	24	
1990	16	8	0	8	0	0	32	8th	Jimmy Cook	902	Graham Rose	18	
1991	16	7	0	7	1	1	32	8th	Jimmy Cook	546	Roland Lefebvre	15	
1992	17	9	0	6	1	1	40	5th	Richard Harden	454	Ken MacLeay	23	
1993	17	2	0	12	2	1	14	18th	Graham Rose	388	Graham Rose	18	
1994	17	5	0	12	0	0	20	16th	Mark Lathwell	472	Neil Mallender	16	
1995	17	5	0	9	1	2	26	14th	Richard Harden	491	Harvey Trump	17	
1996	17	10	0	6	0	1	42	5th	Peter Bowler	497	Shane Lee	25	
1997	17	9	0	6	0	2	40	6th	Mike Burns	362	Graham Rose	24	
1998	17	6	1	8	1	1	30	14th	Mark Lathwell	345	Steffan Jones	18	
1999	16	13	0	3	0	0	52	2nd, Div. 2	Piran Holloway	645	Steffan Jones	26	
2000	16	7	0	8	1	0	30	6th, Div. 1	Jamie Cox	485	Steffan Jones	28	
2001	16	7	1	7	0	1	32	4th, Div. 1	Peter Bowler	560	Steffan Jones	22	
2002	16	5	0	10	0	1	22	7th, Div. 1	Keith Parsons	383	Steffan Jones	22	
2003	18	5	0	12	1	0	22	9th, Div. 2	Ian Blackwell	566	Nixon McLean	21	
2004	18	6	0	11	1	0	26	8th, Div. 2	Keith Parsons	530	Keith Parsons	16	
2005	18	9	0	8	1	0	38	6th, Div. 2	Ian Blackwell	745	Ian Blackwell	16	
2006	8	2	0	6	0	0	4	7th, Div. 2	James Hildreth	326	Charl Willoughby	10	
2007	8	5	0	2	0	1	11	2nd, Div. 2	Marcus Trescothick	329	Andy Caddick	9	
2008	8	3	1	4	0	0	7	6th, Div. 1	Marcus Trescothick	556	Alfonso Thomas	11	
2009	8	5	0	2	1	0	11	2nd, Div. 1	Zander de Bruyn	324	Ben Phillips	14	

== Benson & Hedges Cup (1972–2002) ==
Season	Benson & Hedges Cup					Notes
Season	Pos	Most runs		Most wickets		Notes
1972	Group stage	Richard Cooper	188	Allan Jones	7	
1973	Group stage	Mervyn Kitchen	113	Allan Jones	8	
1974	Semi-final	Viv Richards	277	Hallam Moseley	13	
1975	Quarter-final	Derek Taylor	177	Allan Jones	10	
1976	Group stage	Mervyn Kitchen	132	Ian Botham	6	
1977	Group stage	Viv Richards	110	Graham Burgess	7	
1978	Semi-final	Brian Rose	156	Ian Botham	12	
1979	Disqualified	Peter Denning	92	Joel Garner	6	
1980	Group stage	Sunil Gavaskar	225	Colin Dredge	11	
1981	Winners	Viv Richards	292	Joel Garner	16	
1982	Winners	Peter Denning	289	Ian Botham	15	
1983	Group stage	Viv Richards	162	Vic Marks	8	
1984	Quarter-final	Martin Crowe	152	Martin Crowe	10	
1985	Group stage	Ian Botham	116	Mark Davis	8	
1986	Group stage	Ian Botham	197	Colin Dredge	8	
1987	Quarter-final	Peter Roebuck	283	Neil Mallender	10	
1988	Group stage	Jon Hardy	172	Adrian Jones	5	
1989	Semi-final	Chris Tavaré	346	Adrian Jones	17	
1990	Semi-final	Jimmy Cook	329	Graham Rose	10	
1991	Group stage	Jimmy Cook	213	Roland Lefebvre	4	
1992	Semi-final	Andy Hayhurst	237	Neil Mallender	10	
1993	Quarter-final	Nick Folland	83	Andre van Troost	2	
1994	Preliminary round	Mark Lathwell	120	Graham Rose	1	
1995	Semi-final	Marcus Trescothick	209	Mushtaq Ahmed	10	
1996	Group stage	Mark Lathwell	278	Andy Caddick	7	
1997	Quarter-final	Mike Burns	256	Graham Rose	9	
1998	Group stage	Mike Burns	175	Marcus Trescothick	8	
1999	Did not qualify	N/A	N/A	N/A	N/A	
2000	Group stage	Piran Holloway	152	Paul Jarvis	2	
2001	Quarter-final	Marcus Trescothick	385	Jason Kerr	11	
2002	Group stage	Robert Turner	110	Keith Dutch	5	

== Twenty20 Cup (2003–present) ==
Season	Twenty20 Cup					Notes
Season	Pos	Most runs		Most wickets		Notes
2003	Group stage	Keith Dutch	133	Steffan Jones	5	
2004	Group stage	Keith Dutch	158	Aaron Laraman	7	
2005	Winners	Graeme Smith	380	Ian Blackwell	16	
2006	Group stage	Justin Langer	464	Charl Willoughby	12	
2007	Group stage	Cameron White	190	Charl Willoughby	6	
2008	Group stage	Marcus Trescothick	306	Alfonso Thomas	11	
2009	Runners up	Zander de Bruyn	391	Alfonso Thomas	18	
2010	Runners up	Marcus Trescothick	572	Alfonso Thomas	33	
2011	Runners up	Marcus Trescothick	507	Lewis Gregory	18	
2012	Semi-final	James Hildreth	223	George Dockrell	9	
2013	Quarter-final	Craig Kieswetter	517	Yasir Arafat	20	
2014	Group stage	Craig Kieswetter	497	Dirk Nannes	24	
2015	Group stage	Chris Gayle	322	Alfonso Thomas	15	
2016	Group stage	Jim Allenby	328	Jamie Overton	14	
2017	Quarter-final	James Hildreth	293	Max Waller	16	
2018	Semi-final	Corey Anderson	514	Jamie Overton	24	
2019	Group stage	Babar Azam	578	Roelof van der Merwe	15	
2020	Group stage	Tom Abell	227	Ollie Sale	13	
2021	Runners up	Will Smeed	385	Marchant de Lange	18	
2022	Semi-final	Rilee Rossouw	623	Ben Green	21	
2023	Winners	Will Smeed	523	Matt Henry	31	
2024	Runners up	Tom Banton	515	Ben Green	21	
2025	Winners	Will Smeed	620	Riley Meredith	28	
2026	Semi-final	James Rew	430	Jake Ball; Daniel Sams	20	
