= List of Somerset County Cricket Club players with 100 or more first-class or List A appearances =

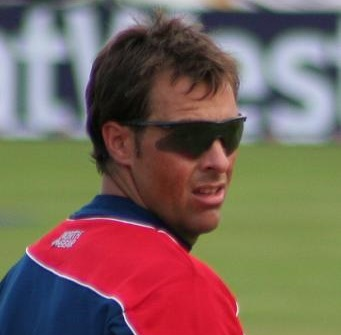
Marcus Trescothick, Somerset's leading List A and second-highest first-class run-scorer

Somerset County Cricket Club are an English cricket club based in Taunton, Somerset. The club was founded in 1875 after a match between "Gentlemen of Somerset" and "Gentlemen of Devon" in Sidmouth, Devon. Somerset played their first undisputed first-class cricket match in 1882 against Lancashire. After missing the first season of the official County Championship, Somerset was admitted for the second in 1891, and have participated in the competition ever since. The club have played one-day cricket since its introduction to the English game in 1963, winning their first trophy in the 1979 Gillette Cup. All players who have played in 100 first-class or List A cricket matches are listed below. Only four players have made over 100 appearances in Twenty20 cricket for Somerset, James Hildreth currently holds the record for the most matches in the format for the club, having made 205 appearances.

Brian Langford holds the record for the greatest number of first-class appearances for Somerset. Between 1953 and 1974 the right-arm off break bowler played 504 times for the club. Only three other players have made more than 400 appearances for Somerset, and no-one has reached the milestone since Langford. Jack White, one of the three, is the club's leading wicket-taker in first-class cricket, claiming 2,165 dismissals for the county between 1909 and 1937. Harold Gimblett's tally of 21,142 first-class runs is the most by a Somerset cricketer, over 1,000 more than the next, Marcus Trescothick.

Englishmen Peter Denning and Graham Rose, jointly hold the record for most List A appearances for Somerset, while Marcus Trescothick holds the record for the most runs in one-day cricket for Somerset, with 7,374 from his twenty-one years with the county. Barbadian Hallam Moseley ranks as the top wicket-taker, claiming 309 wickets in one-day cricket, nine more than England Test cricketer Ian Botham.

== Key ==
- * denotes that player is still active for Somerset.
- **Apps** denotes the number of appearances the player has made for Somerset.
- **Runs** denotes the number of runs scored by the player for Somerset.
- **Wkts** denotes the number of wickets taken by the player for Somerset.
- Players are initially listed according to the date of their first-team debut for the club.
- Players in **bold** have appeared in either Test or One Day International matches for their country.

== Players ==
Name	Nationality	Somerset career	Apps	Runs	Wkts	Apps	Runs	Wkts	References
Name	Nationality	Somerset career	First-class			List A			References
George Nichols	England	1891–1899	134	2,793	291	–	–	–	
Gerald Fowler	England	1891–1903	119	3,472	76	–	–	–	
**Ted Tyler**	England	1891–1907	177	2,875	864	–	–	–	
**Lionel Palairet**	England	1891–1909	222	13,851	87	–	–	–	
**Sammy Woods**	Australia/England	1891–1910	299	12,637	556	–	–	–	
Vernon Hill	England	1891–1912	121	3,842	24	–	–	–	
Arthur Newton	England	1891–1914	197	3,063	0	–	–	–	
Ernie Robson	England	1895–1923	424	12,427	1,122	–	–	–	
Beaumont Cranfield	England	1897–1908	125	1,250	563	–	–	–	
John Daniell	England	1898–1927	287	9,824	6	–	–	–	
Talbot Lewis	England	1899–1914	208	7,633	513	–	–	–	
**Len Braund**	England	1899–1920	281	12,218	684	–	–	–	
Peter Randall Johnson	England	1901–1927	229	10,202	3	–	–	–	
Massey Poyntz	England	1905–1919	102	2,990	8	–	–	–	
Bill Greswell	England	1908–1930	115	2,416	454	–	–	–	
**Jack White**	England	1909–1937	409	11,375	2,165	–	–	–	
Jimmy Bridges	England	1911–1929	214	2,414	685	–	–	–	
**Jack MacBryan**	England	1911–1931	156	8,372	0	–	–	–	
Tom Young	England	1911–1933	310	13,081	388	–	–	–	
Sydney Rippon	England	1914–1937	102	3,788	3	–	–	–	
Dar Lyon	England	1920–1938	123	6,227	8	–	–	–	
George Hunt	England	1921–1931	233	4,952	386	–	–	–	
Guy Earle	England	1922–1931	152	4,627	86	–	–	–	
Reggie Ingle	England	1923–1939	309	9,401	0	–	–	–	
Wally Luckes	England	1924–1949	365	5,710	0	–	–	–	
Box Case	England	1925–1935	255	8,515	0	–	–	–	
Jack Lee	England	1925–1936	241	7,852	49	–	–	–	
Bunty Longrigg	England	1925–1947	219	8,329	0	–	–	–	
Dickie Burrough	England	1927–1947	171	5,316	0	–	–	–	
Arthur Wellard	England	1927–1947	391	11,432	1,517	–	–	–	
Michael Bennett	England	1928–1939	109	2,330	14	–	–	–	
Frank Lee	England	1929–1947	328	15,243	23	–	–	–	
Horace Hazell	England	1929–1952	350	2,280	957	–	–	–	
Bertie Buse	England	1929–1953	304	10,623	657	–	–	–	
Bill Andrews	England	1930–1947	226	4,833	750	–	–	–	
**Harold Gimblett**	England	1935–1954	329	21,142	41	–	–	–	
Johnny Lawrence	England	1946–1955	281	9,094	791	–	–	–	
Les Angell	England	1947–1956	132	4,596	0	–	–	–	
**Maurice Tremlett**	England	1947–1960	353	15,195	326	–	–	–	
Stuart Rogers	England	1948–1953	118	3,607	2	–	–	–	
Harold Stephenson	England	1948–1964	427	12,473	0	1	4	0	
Peter Wight	West Indies	1953–1965	321	16,965	62	6	56	0	
Brian Langford	England	1953–1974	504	7,513	1,390	66	441	65	
John McMahon	England	1954–1957	115	645	349	–	–	–	
Geoff Lomax	England	1954–1962	211	7,516	235	–	–	–	
Graham Atkinson	England	1954–1966	271	14,468	4	10	297	0	
Bryan Lobb	England	1955–1969	115	624	368	–	–	–	
**Ken Palmer**	England	1955–1969	302	7,567	837	24	137	34	
**Colin McCool**	Australia	1956–1960	138	7,913	219	–	–	–	
Brian Roe	England	1957–1966	131	4,859	2	5	55	0	
Chris Greetham	England	1957–1966	205	6,723	195	10	150	3	
Bill Alley	Australia	1957–1968	350	16,644	738	16	281	25	
Roy Virgin	England	1957–1972	321	15,458	4	84	1,938	1	
Colin Atkinson	England	1960–1967	163	3,772	190	12	153	7	
Mervyn Kitchen	England	1960–1979	352	15,213	2	172	3,388	5	
**Fred Rumsey**	England	1963–1968	153	766	520	15	9	30	
Peter Robinson	England	1965–1977	180	4,887	291	63	964	8	
Tony Clarkson	England	1966–1971	104	4,378	8	50	762	2	
Graham Burgess	England	1966–1980	252	7,129	474	207	3,130	247	
Peter Denning	England	1969–1984	269	11,559	1	280	6,792	0	
**Brian Rose**	England	1969–1987	251	12,342	8	251	5,708	7	
Allan Jones	England	1970–1975	118	442	291	113	101	164	
**Tom Cartwright**	England	1970–1976	101	2,422	408	94	972	10	
Derek Taylor	England	1970–1982	280	6,796	0	261	2,035	0	
**Brian Close**	England	1971–1977	142	7,567	74	126	2,658	41	
Hallam Moseley	West Indies	1971–1982	205	1,502	547	210	519	309	
Dennis Breakwell	England	1973–1984	165	3,777	281	148	1,059	58	
**Ian Botham**	England	1973–1986	172	8,686	489	230	5,049	300	
**Viv Richards**	West Indies	1974–1986	191	14,698	96	218	7,349	93	
Peter Roebuck	England	1974–1991	306	16,218	45	277	6,871	40	
Phil Slocombe	England	1975–1983	135	5,539	3	78	829	0	
**Vic Marks**	England	1975–1989	275	9,742	738	250	3,623	226	
Colin Dredge	England	1976–1988	194	2,182	443	209	464	253	
Trevor Gard	England	1976–1989	112	1,389	0	81	240	0	
**Joel Garner**	West Indies	1977–1986	94	1,170	338	128	703	206	
Jeremy Lloyds	England	1979–1984	100	4,036	133	62	592	3	
Nigel Popplewell	England	1979–1985	118	4,594	78	116	2,022	43	
Nigel Felton	England	1982–1988	108	4,987	0	62	1,269	0	
Richard Harden	England	1985–1998	233	12,488	16	252	6,275	0	
Neil Burns	England	1987–1993	150	5,207	0	154	1,678	0	
**Neil Mallender**	England	1987–1994	118	1,461	329	136	500	148	
Graham Rose	England	1987–2002	244	8,644	588	280	4,937	29	
**Chris Tavaré**	England	1989–1993	102	6,365	0	109	3,465	0	
Andy Hayhurst	England	1990–1996	122	6,634	60	121	2,678	94	
**Mark Lathwell**	England	1990–2001	142	7,988	13	166	4,399	1	
**Andy Caddick**	England	1990–2009	191	3,139	875	197	556	254	
Robert Turner	England	1991–2005	211	8,473	0	226	3,358	0	
Keith Parsons	England	1992–2007	130	5,324	106	247	5,225	146	
**Marcus Trescothick**	England	1993–2019	296	19,654	31	236	7,374	48	
Piran Holloway	England	1994–2003	114	5,419	0	97	2,402	0	
Peter Bowler	England	1995–2004	160	9,642	14	159	4,431	2	
Mike Burns	England	1997–2005	134	7,008	68	179	4,325	58	
Steffan Jones	England	1997–2008	84	1,443	224	138	478	197	
Jamie Cox	Australia	1999–2004	91	6,688	4	110	3,598	4	
**Ian Blackwell**	England	2000–2008	120	7,454	210	149	3,930	114	
Peter Trego	England	2000–2019	200	8,775	349	176	4,666	144	
Arul Suppiah	Malaysia	2002–2013	100	5,156	45	89	1,580	44	
James Hildreth	England	2003–2022	277	17,237	6	222	6,096	5	
**Craig Kieswetter**	England	2007–2015	105	5,062	2	79	2,815	1	
**Lewis Gregory***	England	2010–present	146	4,852	434	65	1,052	89	
**Craig Overton***	England	2012–present	148	4,560	516	46	560	72	
**Jack Leach***	England	2012–present	128	1,706	407	35	73	45	
Tom Abell*	England	2014–present	150	9,536	60	25	636	2	
Statistics correct as of end of 2026 season.

== Bibliography ==
- Foot, David (1986). Sunshine, Sixes and Cider: The History of Somerset Cricket (1986 ed.). David & Charles. ISBN 0-7153-8890-8.
