= Somerset County Cricket Club in 1891 =

Somerset CCC 1891 cricket season

Somerset County Cricket Club
1891 season
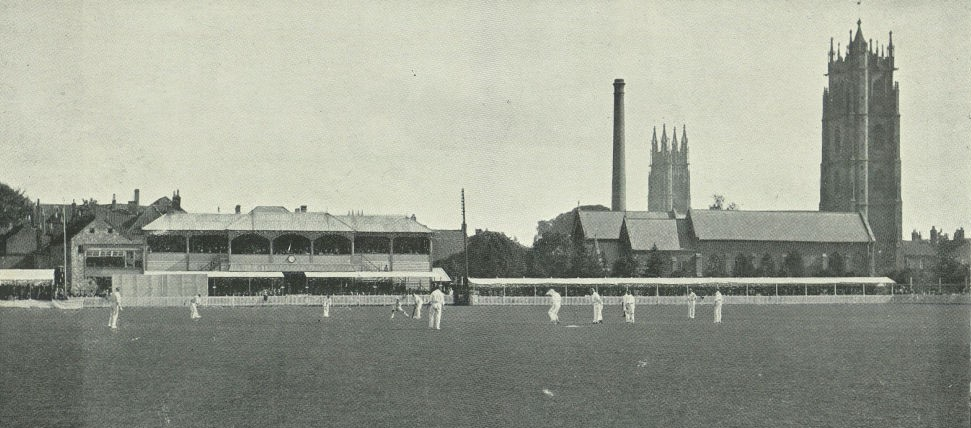
- Somerset played their home matches at the County Ground, Taunton
- Captain: Herbie Hewett
- County Championship: 5th (joint)
- Most runs: Lionel Palairet (560)
- Most wickets: Sammy Woods (72)
- Most catches: Sammy Woods (10)
- Most wicket-keeping dismissals: Archie Wickham (15)

In the 1891 English cricket season, Somerset County Cricket Club returned to first-class cricket after a five-year absence. They competed in the County Championship, which had been established the previous year, for the first time. Somerset began the season poorly, drawing one and losing two of their opening three fixtures, after which there were some comments in the press questioning whether the club deserved to be playing first-class cricket. A victory over Kent in their next game shifted opinion in their favour, and another win later in the season over Surrey, who won the County Championship in both 1890 and 1891, gained them further plaudits. Overall, Somerset won five, lost six and drew one of their County Championship matches, and finished fifth in the table, level with Kent.

The Somerset team predominantly consisted of amateur batsmen, supported by two professional bowlers. Lionel Palairet led Somerset's batting in terms of both runs and average during the County Championship season, scoring 560 runs at an average of 31.11, and was also the only Somerset player to score a century during 1891. Somerset's professional bowlers, George Nichols and Ted Tyler, along with an amateur all-rounder, Sammy Woods, did almost all of the bowling for the county; Woods led the bowling tables with 72 wickets at an average of 17.08.

== Background ==
Somerset County Cricket Club was founded in 1875 but struggled to establish itself amongst the leading cricketing counties over the subsequent decade. For four seasons, from 1882 until 1885, the county side is considered by modern records to have been of first-class status, though contemporary publications were not unanimous in that classification. Nonetheless, even those publications that had counted Somerset among the first-class counties agreed that the club no longer deserved it after 1885, due to a string of heavy losses and matches in which Somerset could not field a full team of eleven players. Meetings were held at the club, and Henry Murray-Anderdon took over as secretary. Under his leadership, Somerset made significant improvements to their home ground, the County Ground, Taunton, until Murray-Anderdon was satisfied that "opponents will want to come here and play". In addition to improving the ground, the secretary targeted university players to add talent to the team, such as the brothers Lionel and Richard Palairet, Vernon Hill and Sammy Woods, and added two professional bowlers, George Nichols and Ted Tyler.

In 1890, Somerset played thirteen fixtures against other county sides, winning twelve and tying the other, against Middlesex. Nichols and Tyler claimed over 200 wickets between them, and Somerset won the 'Second-class County Championship'. In August 1890, the County Cricket Council, which was responsible for the classification of county sides at the time, kept Somerset among the second-class counties for 1891. At the council's annual general meeting in December of that year, Herbie Hewett, the club captain, and Thomas Spencer, the joint secretary, were among the voices which led the County Cricket Council to dissolve, and allowed each county to arrange its fixtures. The next day, a meeting of the county secretaries at Lord's unanimously voted for Somerset to be admitted to the first-class County Championship, and Somerset scheduled a twelve-match fixture list, consisting of home-and-away fixtures against six of the eight other first-class counties: Gloucestershire, Kent, Lancashire, Middlesex, Surrey and Yorkshire. During a subsequent gathering in Taunton, Spencer explained that the decision to restrict their fixture list to twelve matches, which meant they did not face either Nottinghamshire or Sussex, was primarily a financial decision. In their preview of the season, Cricket: A Weekly Record of the Game described this as "a sufficiently heavy task", which was "onerous enough to try thoroughly their capacity to maintain a place in the front rank".

== Squad ==
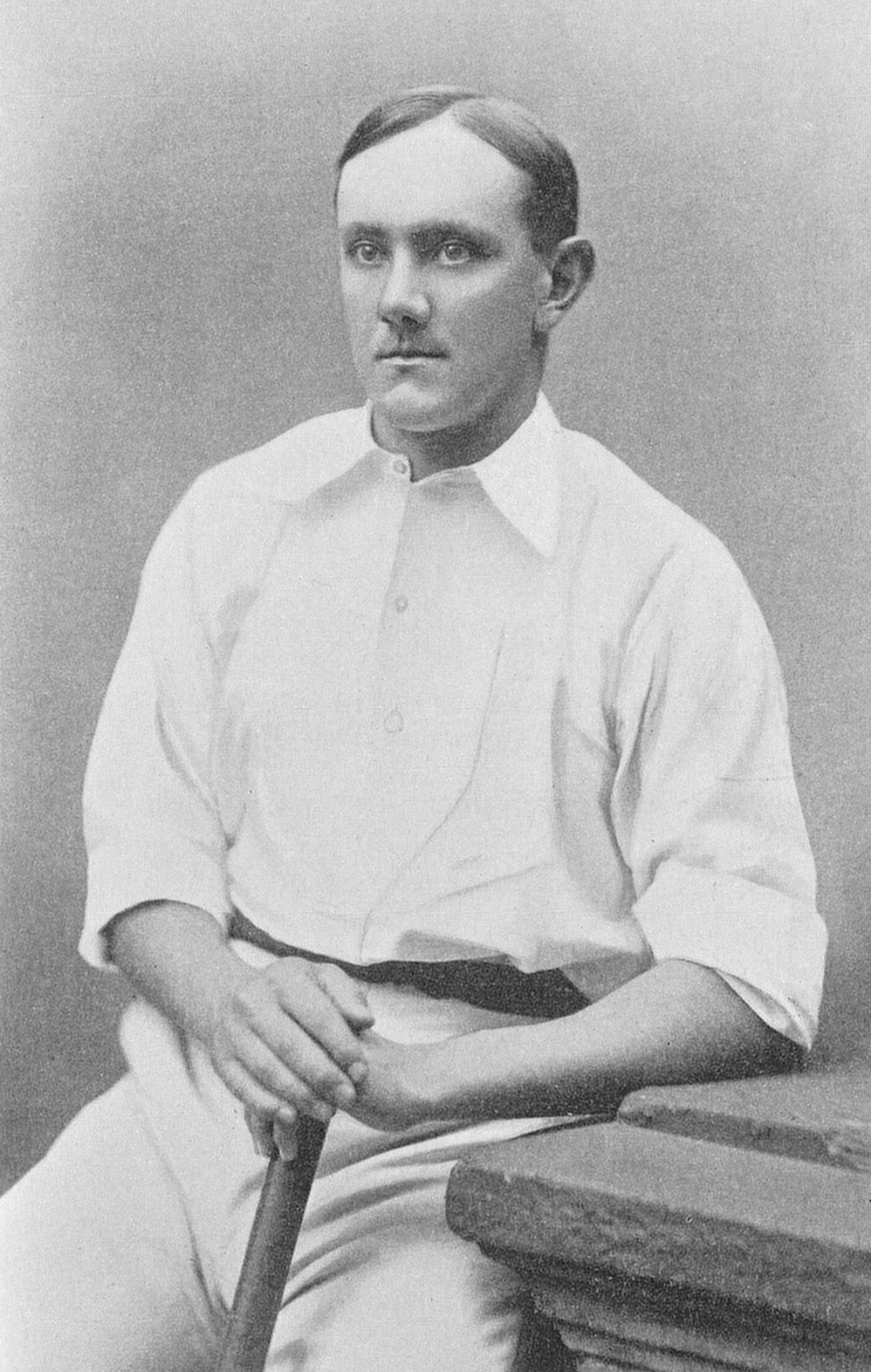
Somerset were captained in 1891 by Herbie Hewett.

During the 1891 season, twenty-two players appeared for Somerset across the club's twelve County Championship matches. Three players appeared in all twelve matches: the captain, Hewett, and the two professional bowlers, Nichols and Tyler. Although the county was able to field eleven players in all their matches, they still missed some of their better players occasionally, generally due to business or university commitments. Such a situation led to the joint secretary, Spencer, making his first-class debut against Yorkshire in July. Team selection was decided by a six-member panel consisting of the captain, both secretaries and three appointed members from the club's general committee. This sometimes made it difficult when last-minute team changes were necessary due to player unavailability, as it was not always possible to reconvene the whole selection committee.

Somerset's bowling resources were limited; only Nichols, Tyler and Woods were recognised bowlers, and between them claimed 169 of the county's 179 wickets. Recognising the reliance Somerset placed on him, Woods bowled slower than he had done earlier in his career. Ron Roberts, the author of a history of Somerset cricket, praised the variation this provided in Woods' bowling, as Woods finished the season as the club's leading bowler by both wickets taken, 72, and bowling average, 17.08. In their summary of the season, the Taunton Courier noted that none of Nichols, Tyler and Woods particularly shone, blaming their heavy workload: "This is not surprising, for the other five men tried with the ball only delivered a hundred overs between them." Despite only playing 10 of the 12 County Championship matches, Lionel Palairet was the club's leading run-scorer by over 200 runs, getting 560 runs at an average of 31.11, and was the only player to score a century for Somerset in 1891.

Hewett and Woods also played in representative cricket in 1891; both appeared for the Gentlemen of England and toured North America as part of Lord Hawke's XI at the end of the season, while Woods also played two matches for the Gentlemen in the Gentlemen v Players fixture, and appeared for the South of England cricket team.

The following players made at least one appearance for Somerset in the County Championship. Age given is at the start of Somerset's first match of the season (18 May 1891).

Somerset players in 1891
Name	Age	Batting stance	Bowling style (Note: A dash indicates that the player in question did not bowl for Somerset in 1891)	Status	Apps
John Challen	28	Right-handed	—	Amateur	9
Albert Clapp	24	Right-handed	—	Professional	2
Ernest Evans	29	Unknown	—	Amateur	1
Gerald Fowler	24	Right-handed	Right arm fast-medium	Amateur	6
Herbert Fox	32	Right-handed	—	Amateur	1
Joseph Gibbs	23	Right-handed	—	Amateur	1
Herbie Hewett (captain)	26	Left-handed	—	Amateur	12
Vernon Hill	20	Left-handed	Right arm fast-medium	Amateur	9
Edward Lock	22	Unknown	—	Amateur	1
Arthur Newton (WK)	28	Right-handed	—	Amateur	6
George Nichols	28	Right-handed	Right arm fast-medium	Professional	12
Lionel Palairet	20	Right-handed	Right arm medium pace / slow (underarm)	Amateur	10
Richard Palairet	19	Right-handed	—	Amateur	10
Frederick Poynton	21	Right-handed	Unknown	Amateur	2
Crescens Robinson	26	Right-handed	—	Amateur	11
Bill Roe	30	Right-handed	Right arm off break / medium pace	Amateur	7
Hamilton Ross	41	Right-handed	—	Amateur	1
Thomas Spencer	40	Unknown	—	Amateur	1
Ted Tyler	26	Left-handed	Left-arm orthodox spin	Professional	12
Archie Wickham (WK)	35	Right-handed	—	Amateur	6
Sammy Woods	24	Right-handed	Right arm fast-medium	Amateur	11
Wilfrid Young	23	Right-handed	—	Amateur	1

== County Championship ==
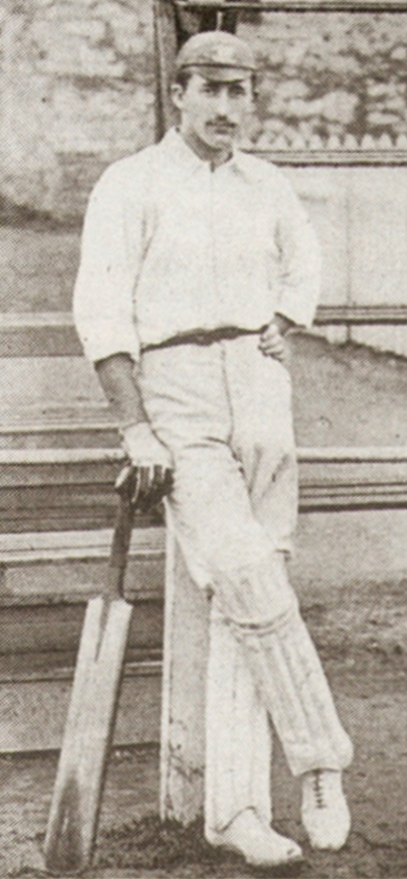
Lionel Palairet led Somerset's batting averages in the County Championship, scoring 560 runs at 31.11.

Somerset began their County Championship campaign with a trip to London to face Middlesex in a match heavily affected by rain. There was no play on the first and last days of the three-day game and just under five hours on the other. Somerset's opening batsmen, Hewett and Gerald Fowler, scored some quick runs, but ultimately with so much time lost the match was drawn. Two weeks later, Somerset returned to London to face Surrey, the 1890 county champions. Somerset were missing some key players, including Woods and both Palairet brothers. Surrey batted first and scored 449 runs on the first day; Tyler bowled 80 overs, while Nichols bowled 71.3. Somerset collapsed twice in response, scoring 37 runs in each innings and losing the match by an innings and 375 runs. (Note: Cricket results are presented in various ways, depending on the circumstances. When the team bowling last wins the game, and has only batted one innings compared to its opponent's two, then it is described as winning by an innings and however many more runs they scored than their opponents. See Scoring (cricket) for more information.) As of 2023, the defeat remains Somerset's fourth-largest innings loss. Somerset hosted Lancashire for their third match of the season. The visitors won the toss and batted first, accruing 210 runs. Somerset then scored 128 runs in their first innings, led by a score of 37 from Lionel Palairet. Their low total meant that for the second successive match, they had to follow-on. (Note: At the time, the follow-on rule made it compulsory for a team batting second to have to immediately bat again if they were 80 or more runs behind their opponents. Manipulation of this rule meant that in 1900 it was changed to make the follow-on optional, at the choice of the bowling side, while the number of runs at which it applies has been adjusted several times.) Batting again on day two, The Manchester Guardian reported that "at no time did [Somerset] look like escaping a severe beating." Some attacking batting from Woods helped Somerset to a total of 132, a lead of 50 runs. Lancashire scored the requisite runs in under 45 minutes to win by nine wickets. (Note: Cricket results are presented in various ways, depending on the circumstances. When the team batting last wins the game, then it wins by the number of wickets it had remaining when it passed the other team's total. See Scoring (cricket) for more information.) The Times remarked that Somerset's play in their opening three matches was disappointing, given their success the previous year, while The Sportsman was less kind, saying after Somerset's loss to Surrey that they were "first-class in classification ... at least for the remainder of the season".

In mid-July, Somerset travelled to Kent and achieved their first win of 1891. Strong bowling performances from Woods, who took five wickets, and Nichols, who bowled 17 maiden overs, helped limit Kent to 106 runs in their first innings. Lionel Palairet scored 79 runs in Somerset's response, while Challen batted for almost two-and-a-half hours to score 41 runs. Somerset reached 218 runs in the first innings and then bowled Kent out once more for 160 runs, during which Tyler took five wickets. Somerset lost five wickets in their second innings chasing down the target but secured both their first win, and Kent's first loss, of the season. Later that month against Gloucestershire, Somerset again managed to dismiss their opponents for a low total; Woods took six wickets as Gloucestershire were restricted to 94 runs. Three Somerset batsmen then scored half-centuries in their first innings—Lionel Palairet scored 53, Richard Palairet 74, and Tyler 62—to help Somerset to a total of 236. In Gloucestershire's second innings, Nichols bowled economically and claimed five wickets for 33 runs as the visiting team could only level the scores, leaving Lionel Palairet to score one run in the fourth innings of the match to win it for Somerset. During their sixth match of the season, against Yorkshire, Somerset lost the toss for the fifth consecutive game. Yorkshire batted first and scored 291; Woods and Tyler took four wickets each. In reply, Somerset's opening pair of Hewett and Lionel Palairet started well, sharing a partnership of 56, but they ended up as the county's top scorers with 39 and 76 runs respectively, and Somerset finished on 220, 71 runs in arrears. Yorkshire scored even more runs in their second innings, thanks to a century from George Ulyett, and left Somerset requiring 387 runs to win. No Somerset batsmen managed to establish themselves; Hill was the highest scorer in the innings with 30 runs, and Yorkshire won the match by 262 runs.

Having played all six of their season's opponents once, Somerset held a record of two wins, three losses and a draw, and began their return fixtures at home against Kent on 30 July. The wicket had been affected by heavy rain in the twenty-four hours before the match, which made batting difficult for both sides in the first innings. Somerset scored 101; only the Palairet brothers and Nichols made double-figure scores, while Kent scored 96. Somerset then added another 189 runs in the second innings; Crescens Robinson scored a half-century to help the county recover from being 100 for eight. (Note: "100 for eight" is cricket notation which could also be written 100/8, and signifies that the batting team has scored 100 runs, and has lost eight of its ten wickets. See Scoring (cricket) for more information.) Kent subsequently reached their target of 198 runs to beat Somerset by four wickets. In their next match, Somerset visited Yorkshire. The hosts batted first, and started poorly, losing three batsmen for the addition of just 13 runs. One of these, Robert Frank, had to retire hurt after being hit in the hand by a high full toss bowled by Woods and took no further part in the match. Woods ultimately took five wickets in the first innings to help limit Yorkshire to 175 runs; he was also key to Somerset's first-innings batting, being one of two players, along with Lionel Palairet, to score half-centuries as the visitors scored 201. Woods was again prolific in Yorkshire's second innings, taking six more wickets to finish the match with eleven in total, one of two ten-wicket hauls taken by Somerset bowlers that season. Yorkshire were dismissed for 116 runs, and Somerset then scored 91 runs to win by six wickets. Travelling to Manchester to face Lancashire, Somerset had the worst of the batting conditions; stormy weather delayed the start of the match and made batting difficult in Somerset's first innings, though the report in Cricket: A Weekly Record of the Game praised their score of 156 as "a creditable achievement" given the conditions. Tyler took five wickets in Lancashire's response, as the hosts scored 215. Somerset struggled at the start of their second innings, losing four wickets for 44 runs before another rain shower stopped play. Batting again the next morning on a difficult pitch, Somerset collapsed to 92 all out, and Lancashire scored the 31 runs they needed to win by eight wickets.

The day after completing their match against Lancashire in Manchester, Somerset returned to Taunton to face Surrey. To that point in the 1891 season, Surrey were undefeated in first-class matches and were considered champions-elect. Somerset's County Ground was full, with an estimated 3,500 people present on the first day. Somerset batted first, and on a good surface put on 194 runs for the first innings, of which Hewett got the highest score with 55. Surrey only scored 154 on their first attempt, but did avoid having to follow-on, which had looked likely at one stage. In Somerset's second innings they scored 331, based on a good team batting performance; nine of the ten players who batted hit double figures, led by Challen's 89 and Lionel Palairet's 60. Surrey needed 372 runs to win, but there were only five hours left in the match, so they batted defensively, playing for a draw. Surrey's top order batsmen played stoically, and Surrey had five wickets remaining with half an hour left to play; Walter Read scored 94 runs for the visitors. Woods and Tyler then took three wickets in short order and with eight minutes to go Woods bowled out Read. Woods then collected his fifth wicket of the innings in either the final or penultimate over of the day's play and Somerset won by 130 runs. Somerset's victory was roundly praised in the national media, typified by a comment in The Standard that the victory "finally settled any doubt which may have remained as to their right to stand in the first rank." Somerset's gate receipts for the match were by a wide margin the largest of the season; they collected over £233 (equivalent to £30,000 in 2023) against Surrey, while their next highest total was £87, against Yorkshire.

In their penultimate County Championship match of the season, Somerset batted first in wet conditions and scored 255, including the team's only century of the season; Lionel Palairet scored exactly 100 runs. Woods and Tyler then bowled unchanged for just over 14 overs to bowl Gloucestershire out for 25, which was their lowest first-class total to that point. Batting again in the follow-on, Gloucestershire could not surpass Somerset's first-innings total. Tyler claimed ten wickets in the match, and Somerset won by an innings and 130 runs. Somerset's final game of the season was at home to Middlesex, who batted first and scored 254. In reply, Somerset could not avoid the follow-on: despite a quick 65 runs from Hewett, they fell three runs short with 172 and had to bat again. On a drying wicket that favoured the bowlers, Somerset was dismissed again for 124 runs. After a rain delay, Middlesex scored the necessary runs to win by nine wickets. Somerset finished the County Championship season with five wins, six losses and a draw, placing them joint-fifth in the table with Kent. Team batting and bowling tables compiled by Cricket: A Weekly Record of the Game showed the overall weakness of Somerset's bowling attack; while they ranked fourth in the batting table, they were second-from-last (eighth) in the bowling averages. In the same summary, they noted that Somerset recorded a statistical quirk, as both the largest and smallest innings totals in that year's competition were scored against them: Surrey's 449 and Gloucestershire's 25.

=== Season standings ===
1891 County Championship table
Pos	Team	Pld	W	L	D	A	Pts
1	Surrey	16	12	2	2	0	10
2	Lancashire	16	8	4	3	1	4
3	Middlesex	16	8	5	3	0	3
4	Nottinghamshire	14	5	4	5	0	1
5	Kent	16	4	5	6	1	–1
5	Somerset	12	5	6	1	0	–1
7	Sussex	14	4	7	3	0	–3
8	Yorkshire	16	5	10	1	0	–5
9	Gloucestershire	16	2	10	4	0	–8

=== Match log and statistics ===
Date	Opponents	Venue	Result	Ref
18–20 May	Middlesex (A)	Lord's, London	Drawn	
1–2 June	Surrey (A)	The Oval, London	Lost by an innings and 375 runs	
9–10 July	Lancashire (H)	County Ground, Taunton	Lost by 9 wickets	
13–14 July	Kent (A)	Mote Park, Maidstone	Won by 5 wickets	
20–22 July	Gloucestershire (H)	County Ground, Taunton	Won by 10 wickets	
23–25 July	Yorkshire (H)	County Ground, Taunton	Lost by 262 runs	
30–31 July	Kent (H)	County Ground, Taunton	Lost by 4 wickets	
6–7 August	Yorkshire (A)	Park Avenue, Bradford	Won by 6 wickets	
10–12 August	Lancashire (A)	Old Trafford, Manchester	Lost by 8 wickets	
13–15 August	Surrey (H)	County Ground, Taunton	Won by 130 runs	
17–18 August	Gloucestershire (A)	College Ground, Cheltenham	Won by an innings and 130 runs	
24–26 August	Middlesex (H)	County Ground, Taunton	Lost by 9 wickets	

Batting averages (Note: Qualification: 250 runs. Source: CricketArchive)
Player	Matches	Innings	Runs	Average	HS	100s	50s
Lionel Palairet	10	19	560	31.11	100	1	5
John Challen	9	16	354	25.28	89	0	2
Richard Palairet	10	17	266	19.00	74	0	1
Herbie Hewett	12	22	388	18.47	65	0	2
Sammy Woods	11	19	330	18.33	50	0	1

Bowling averages (Note: Qualification: 10 wickets. Source: CricketArchive)
Player	Matches	Deliveries	Wickets	Average	BBI	5wi	10wm
Sammy Woods	11	2,329	72	17.08	6/49	7	1
George Nichols	12	2,614	49	18.16	5/33	1	0
Ted Tyler	12	2,182	48	22.31	5/10	4	1

== Other first-class ==
=== Match log ===
In addition to their County Championship fixtures, Somerset played one other first-class fixture, against the Marylebone Cricket Club (MCC). The side sent by the MCC was described as "a very moderate side" by Cricket: A Weekly Record of the Game, while Somerset were missing Woods. Somerset batted first and scored 228, led by Fowler with 51 runs. The MCC then batted twice in a row, after being forced to follow-on, and scored 114 and 140. Tyler took nine wickets between the two innings, while Fowler took six in the second innings. Somerset won the match by six wickets after scoring the additional 28 runs needed in their second innings.

Date	Opponents	Venue	Result	Ref
21–22 August	Marylebone Cricket Club (H)	County Ground, Taunton	Won by 6 wickets	

== Aftermath ==
At the end-of-season annual general meeting, the Somerset committee expressed their pleasure at both the playing and financial results for the season; both subscriptions and gate receipts had increased, combining to over £1,000 (equivalent to £140,000 in 2023). Their performance over the season was praised in the press; the Yorkshire Herald said Somerset "have fully justified their fit inclusion in the first-class ranks", while similar sentiments were expressed in the Coventry Evening Telegraph and, more locally, the Bath Chronicle. In his book A History of Cricket, H. S. Altham writes that: "From the moment they appeared in the competition, Somerset won popularity as a sporting and attractive side."

All the players except for Wilfrid Young, who was travelling abroad, were expected to be available the following year. They noted the need for another professional bowler to support Nichols, Tyler and Woods, and although they did not secure another such a professional, they did add Coote Hedley, an amateur all-rounder with genuine bowling ability. In 1892, Somerset played a full fixture list against all of the other eight first-class counties, and finished the season with eight wins and five losses, placing third in the Championship table, a position they would not equal again until 1958.

== Notes, references and sources ==
=== Sources ===
- Altham, H. S.; Swanton, E. W. (1938) [1926]. A History of Cricket. London: George Allen & Unwin Ltd. OCLC 10246496.
- Brodribb, Gerald (1985). Next Man In: A Survey of Cricket Laws and Customs. London: Pelham Books. ISBN 0-7207-1585-7.
- Foot, David (1986). Sunshine, Sixes and Cider: The History of Somerset Cricket. Newton Abbot, Devon: David & Charles. ISBN 0-7153-8890-8.
- Hill, Stephen (2016). Somerset Cricketers 1882–1914. Wellington, Somerset: Halsgrove. ISBN 978-0-85704-291-0.
- Roberts, Ron (1952). Sixty Years of Somerset Cricket. London: Westaway Books. OCLC 30202143.
- Roebuck, Peter (1991). From Sammy to Jimmy: The Official History of Somerset County Cricket Club. London: Partridge Press. ISBN 1-85225-085-2.
