= 1990 Benson & Hedges Cup =

- Administrator(s): Test and County Cricket Board
- Cricket format: Limited overs cricket (55 overs per innings)
- Champions: Lancashire (2nd title)
- Participants: 20
- Matches: 47
- Most runs: 435 Neil Fairbrother (Lancashire)
- Most wickets: 12 Mike Watkinson (Lancashire)

The 1990 Benson & Hedges Cup was the nineteenth edition of cricket's Benson & Hedges Cup.

The competition was won by Lancashire County Cricket Club.

== Fixtures and results ==
=== Group stage ===
==== Group A ====
Team	Pld	W	L	NR	A	Pts	Rp100
Worcestershire	4	3	1	0	0	6	72.77
Glamorgan	4	3	1	0	0	6	69.46
Kent	4	2	1	1	0	5	71.71
Warwickshire	4	1	3	0	0	2	63.58
Gloucestershire	4	0	3	1	0	1	67.77

==== Group B ====
Team	Pld	W	L	NR	A	Pts	Rp100
Somerset	4	3	1	0	0	6	85.46
Middlesex	4	3	1	0	0	6	74.86
Sussex	4	2	2	0	0	4	78.94
Derbyshire	4	2	2	0	0	4	77.34
Minor Counties	4	0	4	0	0	0	66.43

==== Group C ====
Team	Pld	W	L	NR	A	Pts	Rp100
Lancashire	4	3	0	1	0	7	67.84
Surrey	4	2	2	0	0	4	75.30
Yorkshire	4	2	2	0	0	4	62.08
Hampshire	4	1	2	1	0	3	75.45
Combined Universities	4	1	3	0	0	2	61.91

==== Group D ====
Team	Pld	W	L	NR	A	Pts	Rp100
Essex	4	3	0	0	1	7	82.35
Northamptonshire	4	3	1	0	0	6	63.44
Leicestershire	4	1	2	0	1	3	62.33
Scotland	4	1	3	0	0	2	66.66
Northamptonshire	4	1	3	0	0	2	60.60

=== Quarter-finals ===
30 May 1990
(scorecard)

Essex; 216/8 (55 overs)	v	Nottinghamshire; 219/4 (52.1 overs)
Graham Gooch 87; Eddie Hemmings 2/33 (11 overs)		Tim Robinson 72*; John Stephenson 2/44 (10 overs)

Nottinghamshire won by 6 wickets
County Ground, Chelmsford
Umpires: Chris Balderstone & David Constant
Player of the match: Paul Johnson (Nottinghamshire)

30 May 1990
(scorecard)

Lancashire; 279/6 (55 overs)	v	Surrey; 233 all out (51.4 overs)
Graeme Fowler 96; Waqar Younis 2/55 (11 overs)		Grahame Clinton 77; Mike Watkinson 4/58 (10.4 overs)

Lancashire won by 46 runs
Old Trafford, Manchester
Umpires: John Harris & Alan Whitehead
Player of the match: Neil Fairbrother (Lancashire)

30 May 1990
(scorecard)

Somerset; 183 all out (53.5 overs)	v	Middlesex; 161 all out (51.5 overs)
Chris Tavaré 49; Simon Hughes 3/37 (10.5 overs)		Mike Roseberry 38; Adrian Jones 4/41 (8.5 overs)

Somerset won by 22 runs
County Ground, Taunton
Umpires: Kevin Lyons & Barrie Meyer
Player of the match: Adrian Jones (Somerset)

30 May 1990
(scorecard)

Glamorgan; 191 all out (54.3 overs)	v	Worcestershire; 195/3 (52.2 overs)
Hugh Morris 106; Neal Radford 4/26 (10.3 overs)		Tim Curtis 76*; Steve Watkin 1/32 (11 overs); Viv Richards 1/32 (9 overs)

Worcestershire won by 7 wickets
New Road, Worcester
Umpires: Ray Julian & Ken Palmer
Player of the match: Alan Butcher (Glamorgan)

=== Semi-finals ===
13 June 1990
(scorecard)

Somerset; 212/9 (55 overs)	v	Lancashire; 214/4 (44.5 overs)
Jimmy Cook 49; Wasim Akram 3/29 (11 overs)		Neil Fairbrother 78; Graham Rose 2/44 (10 overs)

Lancashire won by 6 wickets
Old Trafford, Manchester
Umpires: Barry Dudleston & John Holder
Player of the match: Neil Fairbrother (Lancashire)

13 June 1990
(scorecard)

Nottinghamshire; 230/6 (55 overs)	v	Worcestershire; 232/1 (53.2 overs)
Franklyn Stephenson 98*; Ian Botham 2/43 (11 overs)		Martin Weston 99*; Franklyn Stephenson 1/45 (11 overs)

Worcestershire won by 9 wickets
Trent Bridge, Nottingham
Umpires: Don Oslear & Roy Palmer
Player of the match: Martin Weston (Worcestershire)

=== Final ===
14 July 1990
(scorecard)

Lancashire; 241/8 (55 overs)	v	Worcestershire; 172 all out (54 overs)
Mike Watkinson 50; Stuart Lampitt 2/43 (11 overs)		Ian Botham 38; Wasim Akram 3/30 (11 overs)

Lancashire won by 69 runs
Lord's, London
Umpires: John Hampshire & Nigel Plews
Player of the match: Mike Watkinson (Lancashire)

== See also ==
- Benson & Hedges Cup
