= 1992 Benson & Hedges Cup =

- Administrator(s): Test and County Cricket Board
- Cricket format: Limited overs cricket (55 overs per innings)
- Champions: Hampshire (2nd title)
- Participants: 21
- Matches: 52
- Most runs: 410 Darren Bicknell (Surrey)
- Most wickets: 18 Mark Feltham (Surrey)

The 1992 Benson & Hedges Cup was the twenty-first edition of cricket's Benson & Hedges Cup.

Durham were accorded first-class status at the start of the 1992 season, and joined the competition for the first time. The number of competitors accordingly increased to 21, resulting in six teams in Group A. The competition was won by Hampshire County Cricket Club.

== Fixtures and results ==
=== Group stage ===
==== Group A ====
Team	Pld	W	L	NR	A	Pts	Rp100
Surrey	5	4	1	0	0	8	82.552
Middlesex	5	4	1	0	0	8	74.486
Leicestershire	5	3	2	0	0	6	63.456
Sussex	5	2	3	0	0	4	63.830
Minor Counties	5	1	4	0	0	0	59.455
Gloucestershire	5	1	4	0	0	0	58.741

==== Group B ====
Team	Pld	W	L	NR	A	Pts	Rp100
Hampshire	4	3	0	1	0	7	70.503
Lancashire	4	3	1	0	0	6	64.870
Essex	4	2	2	0	0	4	64.318
Northamptonshire	4	1	3	0	0	2	73.485
Scotland	4	0	3	1	0	1	51.212

==== Group C ====
Team	Pld	W	L	NR	A	Pts	Rp100
Kent	4	4	0	0	0	8	65.985
Somerset	4	2	2	0	0	4	62.112
Nottinghamshire	4	2	2	0	0	4	61.390
Warwickshire	4	1	3	0	0	2	61.515
Yorkshire	4	1	3	0	0	2	48.030

==== Group D ====
Team	Pld	W	L	NR	A	Pts	Rp100
Worcestershire	4	3	1	0	0	6	63.454
Derbyshire	4	3	1	0	0	6	62.027
Durham	4	2	2	0	0	4	64.950
Glamorgan	4	2	2	0	0	4	58.967
Combined Universities	4	0	4	0	0	0	54.015

=== Quarter-finals ===
27 May 1992
(scorecard)

Middlesex; 206 all out (52.4 overs)	v	Hampshire; 207/4 (51 overs)
Desmond Haynes 89; Shaun Udal 4/40 (11 overs)		Tony Middleton 65; Paul Weekes 2/29 (11 overs)

Hampshire won by 6 wickets
County Ground, Southampton
Umpires: David Constant & Ray Julian
Player of the match: Shaun Udal (Hampshire)

27 May 1992
(scorecard)

Kent; 193 all out (54.1 overs)	v	Derbyshire; 160/9 (55 overs)
Carl Hooper 39; Ian Bishop 4/30 (11 overs)		Kim Barnett 73; Mark Ealham 2/19 (8 overs)

Kent won by 33 runs
St Lawrence Ground, Canterbury
Umpires: Chris Balderstone & Ken Palmer
Player of the match: Richard Davis (Kent)

27 May 1992
(scorecard)

Surrey; 305/7 (55 overs)	v	Lancashire; 230 all out (48 overs)
Darren Bicknell 86; Phillip DeFreitas 2/51 (11 overs)		Stephen Titchard 82; Mark Feltham 3/35 (9 overs)

Surrey won by 75 runs
The Foster’s Oval, London
Umpires: Mervyn Kitchen & Barrie Meyer
Player of the match: Martin Bicknell (Surrey)

27 May 1992
(scorecard)

Somerset; 256/9 (55 overs)	v	Worcestershire; 246 all out (54.4 overs)
Mark Lathwell 93; Tom Moody 4/59 (11 overs)		Tom Moody 80; Richard Snell 3/47 (10.4 overs)

Somerset won by 10 runs
New Road, Worcester
Umpires: Jack Bond & David Shepherd
Player of the match: Tom Moody (Worcestershire)

=== Semi-finals ===
10 June 1992
(scorecard)

Somerset; 218/8 (55 overs)	v	Hampshire; 219/4 (53.1 overs)
Graham Rose 65; Cardigan Connor 4/32 (11 overs)		Paul Terry 89*; Graham Rose 2/23 (10 overs)

Hampshire won by 6 wickets
County Ground, Southampton
Umpires: Dickie Bird & John Holder
Player of the match: Paul Terry (Hampshire)

10 June 1992
(scorecard)

Surrey; 198 all out (54.5 overs)	v	Kent; 199/8 (54.5 overs)
Graham Thorpe 82; Martin McCague 3/23 (5.5 overs)		Carl Hooper 50; Martin Bicknell 2/24 (10.5 overs)

Kent won by 2 wickets
St Lawrence Ground, Canterbury
Umpires: Barry Dudleston & Roy Palmer
Player of the match: Matthew Fleming (Kent)

=== Final ===
11, 12 July 1992
(scorecard)

Hampshire; 253/5 (55 overs)	v	Kent; 212 all out (52.3 overs)
Robin Smith 90; Matthew Fleming 2/63 (8 overs)		Mark Benson 59; Malcolm Marshall 3/33 (10 overs)

Hampshire won by 41 runs
Lord's, London
Umpires: John Hampshire & Mervyn Kitchen
Player of the match: Robin Smith (Hampshire)

- Reserve day used. Kent were 4/0 (1.2 overs) at the close of the first day's play.

== See also ==
Benson & Hedges Cup
