= Peter Denning =

Peter Denning may refer to:

- Peter J. Denning (born 1942), computer scientist
- Peter Denning (cricketer) (1949–2007), cricketer for Somerset County Cricket Club
