= Edward Locke (disambiguation) =

Edward Locke is an American playwright.

Edward or Eddie Locke may also refer to:

- Eddie Locke (baseball) (1923–1992), American baseball player
- Eddie Locke (1930–2009), American jazz drummer

== See also ==
- Ned Locke, TV and radio personality
- Edward Lock, cricketer
