= Somerset County Cricket Club in 1893 =

Somerset County Cricket Club
1893 season
- Captain: Herbie Hewett
- County Championship: 8th
- Most runs: Herbie Hewett (669)
- Most wickets: Ted Tyler (86)
- Most catches: Sammy Woods (16)

In the 1893 season, Somerset County Cricket Club played their seventh season of first-class cricket, and participated in the County Championship for the third season. They finished eighth in the competition, falling five positions from the previous year. Their captain, Herbie Hewett, completed the season as the club's leading run-scorer, accruing 669 runs in the Championship. The left-arm spinner Ted Tyler took the most wickets for the county, with 86. Matches were also played against Oxford University, and the touring Australians.

== County Championship ==
=== Season standings ===
Note: Pld = Played, W = Wins, L = Losses, D = Draws, Pts = Points.

County Championship
Team	Pld	W	L	D	Pts
Yorkshire (C)	16	12	3	1	9
Lancashire	16	9	5	2	4
Middlesex	16	9	6	1	3
Kent	16	6	4	6	2
Surrey	16	7	8	1	–1
Nottinghamshire	16	5	7	4	–2
Sussex	16	4	7	5	–3
Somerset	16	4	8	4	–4
Gloucestershire	16	3	11	2	–8

Notes:
Team marked (C) won the County Championship.

=== Match log and statistics ===
Match log
No.	Date	Opponents	Venue	Result	Ref
1	22–23 May	Middlesex	Lord's, London	Lost by 7 wickets	
2	25–26 May	Sussex	County Ground, Hove	Lost by 9 wickets	
3	1–3 June	Nottinghamshire	Trent Bridge, Nottingham	Lost by 225 runs	
4	15–17 June	Yorkshire	County Ground, Taunton	Lost by an innings and 51 runs	
5	29 June–1 July	Kent	Angel Ground, Tonbridge	Lost by 8 wickets	
6	6–7 July	Yorkshire	Bramall Lane, Sheffield	Lost by an innings and 13 runs	
7	10–12 July	Kent	County Ground, Taunton	Drawn	
8	13–14 July	Surrey	Kennington Oval, London	Won by 39 runs	
9	17–19 July	Lancashire	County Ground, Taunton	Drawn	
10	24–26 July	Lancashire	Aigburth, Liverpool	Lost by 230 runs	
11	7–9 August	Middlesex	County Ground, Taunton	Drawn	
12	10–12 August	Sussex	County Ground, Taunton	Drawn	
13	14–16 August	Gloucestershire	College Ground, Cheltenham	Won by 127 runs	
14	17–18 August	Surrey	County Ground, Taunton	Lost by 8 wickets	
15	21–22 August	Nottinghamshire	County Ground, Taunton	Won by an innings and 99 runs	
16	28–29 August	Gloucestershire	County Ground, Taunton	Won by an innings and 170 runs	

Batting averages
Player	Matches	Innings	Runs	Average	Highest score	100s	50s
Herbie Hewett	13	22	669	31.85	120	2	2
Lionel Palairet	10	18	492	28.94	91	0	5
John Challen	7	12	311	25.91	108	1	1
Richard Palairet	8	13	313	24.07	56	0	3
Coote Hedley	11	19	394	21.88	54*	0	2
Sammy Woods	16	29	564	19.44	62	0	2
Frederic Poynton	10	19	302	16.77	51	0	1
George Nichols	16	28	314	14.95	45	0	0
Qualification: 300 runs. Source: CricketArchive.

Bowling averages
Player	Matches	Balls	Wickets	Average	BBI	5wi	10wm
Ted Tyler	16	4,183	86	19.12	6/50	8	2
Coote Hedley	11	1,549	33	22.18	6/75	1	0
George Nichols	16	2,737	55	22.43	5/50	1	0
Sammy Woods	16	2,546	59	24.83	7/122	2	1
Qualification: 30 wickets. Source: CricketArchive.

== University match ==
Other matches
No.	Date	Opponents	Venue	Result	Ref
1	29–30 May	Oxford University	University Parks, Oxford	Won by 10 wickets	

== Tourist match ==
Other matches
No.	Date	Opponents	Venue	Result	Ref
1	20–22 July	Australians	County Ground, Taunton	Lost by 6 wickets	

== Notes and references ==
References

== Bibliography ==
- Roebuck, Peter. From Sammy to Jimmy: The Official History of Somerset County Cricket Club (1991 ed.). London: Partridge Press. ISBN 1-85225-085-2.
- Foot, David. Sunshine, Sixes and Cider: The History of Somerset Cricket (1986 ed.). Newton Abbot, Devon: David & Charles. ISBN 0-7153-8890-8.
