= 1986 John Player Special League =

- Administrator(s): Test and County Cricket Board
- Cricket format: Limited overs cricket (40 overs per innings)
- Tournament format(s): League
- Champions: Hampshire (3rd title)
- Participants: 17
- Matches: 136
- Most runs: 701 Chris Broad (Nottinghamshire)
- Most wickets: 34 Clive Rice (Nottinghamshire)

The 1986 John Player Special League was the eighteenth competing of what was generally known as the Sunday League. The competition was won for the third time by Hampshire County Cricket Club.

Hampshire won the Sunday League away against Surrey at The Oval on 7 September after they beat them by 3 runs and Nottinghamshire lost versus Kent.

Adrian Jones of Sussex established a Sunday League record on 18 May when took 7 for 41 against Nottinghamshire at Trent Bridge. On 10 August, Ian Botham scored 175 not out off 122 balls for Somerset vs Northamptonshire at Wellingborough. In this innings he hit 12 fours and 13 sixes.

The Nottinghamshire captain Clive Rice's 34 wickets for the season equalled Bob Clapp's Sunday League record.

Stuart Turner the Essex all rounder reached 300 wickets in the Sunday League competition. He announced his retirement that season.

== Standings ==
| Team | Pld | W | T | L | N/R | A | Pts | R/R |
|---|---|---|---|---|---|---|---|---|
| Hampshire (C) | 16 | 12 | 0 | 3 | 0 | 1 | 50 | 5.171 |
| Essex | 16 | 11 | 0 | 4 | 1 | 0 | 46 | 5.513 |
| Nottinghamshire | 16 | 10 | 0 | 5 | 0 | 1 | 42 | 5.062 |
| Sussex | 16 | 10 | 0 | 6 | 0 | 0 | 40 | 4.808 |
| Northamptonshire | 16 | 9 | 0 | 5 | 1 | 1 | 40 | 4.967 |
| Kent | 16 | 7 | 1 | 5 | 1 | 2 | 36 | 4.885 |
| Somerset | 16 | 8 | 0 | 6 | 2 | 0 | 36 | 5.311 |
| Yorkshire | 16 | 7 | 1 | 6 | 1 | 1 | 34 | 4.778 |
| Derbyshire | 16 | 7 | 0 | 9 | 0 | 0 | 28 | 4.692 |
| Middlesex | 16 | 5 | 1 | 7 | 1 | 2 | 28 | 4.542 |
| Warwickshire | 16 | 5 | 2 | 7 | 1 | 1 | 28 | 4.845 |
| Glamorgan | 16 | 6 | 0 | 9 | 0 | 1 | 26 | 4.533 |
| Lancashire | 16 | 6 | 0 | 9 | 1 | 0 | 26 | 4.889 |
| Surrey | 16 | 5 | 1 | 8 | 1 | 1 | 26 | 4.633 |
| Leicestershire | 16 | 5 | 0 | 10 | 0 | 1 | 22 | 4.569 |
| Worcestershire | 16 | 5 | 0 | 11 | 0 | 0 | 20 | 4.927 |
| Gloucestershire | 16 | 3 | 0 | 11 | 0 | 2 | 16 | 4.688 |
Team marked (C) finished as champions. Source: CricketArchive

== See also ==
Sunday League
