= Graham Atkinson (cricketer) =

English cricketer (1938–2015)

Personal information
- Full name: Graham Atkinson
- Born: 29 March 1938; Lofthouse, Yorkshire, England
- Died: 12 November 2015 (aged 77); Bath, Somerset, England
- Batting: Right-handed
- Bowling: Right-arm offbreak
- Role: Batsman

Domestic team information
- Years: Team
- 1954–1966: Somerset
- 1967–1969: Lancashire
- FC debut: 28 July 1954 Somerset v Pakistanis
- Last FC: 12 July 1969 Lancashire v Glamorgan

Career statistics
Competition	First-class	List A
Matches	347	14
Runs scored	17,654	324
Batting average	31.13	23.14
100s/50s	27/91	0/3
Top score	190	72
Balls bowled	477	–
Wickets	5	–
Bowling average	52.00	–
5 wickets in innings	0	–
10 wickets in match	0	–
Best bowling	4/63	–
Catches/stumpings	188/–	2/–
- Source: CricketArchive, 9 October 2009

Graham Atkinson (29 March 1938 – 12 November 2015) was a cricketer who played first-class and List A cricket for Somerset and Lancashire. He was born in Lofthouse, Wakefield, Yorkshire, England.

== Early career ==
A slim, dark-haired right-handed opening batsman, Atkinson made his debut for Somerset as a 16-year-old in 1954, and two years later was a regular member of the 1956 side that managed, late in the season, to raise itself to 15th out of 17 in the County Championship table, having finished bottom for the previous four seasons. In that season, he scored 719 runs, batting mainly in the middle order. Wisden noted that he "showed promise".

Atkinson played less frequently in the 1957 and 1958 seasons as he was on National Service with the Royal Air Force. On leave in July 1958, however, he made his maiden century, scoring 164 for Somerset as an opener in the match against Warwickshire at Taunton.

Atkinson became Somerset's regular opener from the start of the 1959 season and played in virtually every match for the next eight seasons. In his first full season, he scored 1727 runs at an average of 31, but surpassed that in 1960 with 1928 runs at an average of more than 39, finishing 13th in the national batting averages. In this 1960 season, he made his highest first-class score, 190 against Glamorgan at Bath, when he also put on 300 for the third wicket with Peter Wight, then a Somerset county record. In the match against Cambridge University at Taunton in 1960, Atkinson and Roy Virgin put on 172 and 112 for the first wicket in the two Somerset innings, and Cambridge University's opening pair of Roger Prideaux and Tony Lewis responded with first-wicket partnerships of 198 and 137: this is the first time all four innings of a first-class match have started with three-figure opening partnerships.

== Representative cricket ==
Atkinson appears to have been on the verge of selection for international cricket in the early 1960s. In 1960, he was picked for the Marylebone Cricket Club (MCC) side to play the previous season's county champions, Yorkshire, in the traditional opening fixture of the season. In 1961, he played for the Players in the annual Gentlemen v Players match at Lord's. And in 1962, he was picked for the MCC match against the Pakistan touring team, regarded as the most important fixture outside the Test series in the English season. In none of these matches did Atkinson distinguish himself.

His best season in representative cricket was 1963. He played in the season opener for MCC against Yorkshire, and scored 176, putting on 142 with Peter Richardson and 209 with Tony Lewis. Three weeks later he was back at Lord's playing for MCC against the West Indies, opening both innings with John Edrich. Atkinson scored 2 and 63, and Edrich scored 63 and 39, and it was Edrich who played in the first two Tests of the season. Finally he was picked for Young England – he was still just 25 – in the end of season match with an England XI at Scarborough and for the final match of the West Indies' tour against T. N. Pearce XI, but he was not selected for the England tour of India in 1963–64. And with Edrich cementing his England Test place and the emergence of Geoffrey Boycott and Bob Barber as openers, the opportunity never came again.

== In county cricket ==
Atkinson's several opportunities in representative matches came about because of his consistency in county cricket. In both 1961 and 1962, he passed 2000 runs for the season, and he was only just short of 1800 runs in 1963, when Somerset finished third in the County Championship, equalling the best position ever.

In 1964, though, Atkinson was part of a general and sudden decline in Somerset's batting. He was less affected than his previous opening partner, Brian Roe, and also less than Somerset's leading run-scorer of the past 10 years, Peter Wight, both of whom lost their places in the team through lack of form. But Atkinson's own aggregate dipped to 1207 runs for the season and his average to just 26; he failed to score a century. He was always an unspectacular accumulator of runs rather than a quick scorer, but Wisden noted that he "looked only a shadow of his former self because he became so constricted in his style".

There was some improvement in 1965, when Atkinson's solidity was seen as necessary to counter the "brittleness" of much of Somerset's batting. "Atkinson was sometimes criticised for being over cautious and slow—only ten runs in an hour on a batsman's wicket at Weston-super-Mare—but the county would have been badly off without his dogged defence and imperturbability," said Wisden. He made more than 1400 runs and headed the Somerset averages at 31 runs per innings. But 1966 saw a further decline in his average to just 24, and at the end of the season he rejected the terms of the contract that was on offer and left to join Lancashire on special registration for 1967.

== Lancashire cricketer ==
Atkinson's career with Lancashire was not long. In his first season, 1967, he played in almost all the county's first-class matches and formed a useful opening partnership with Barry Wood. He made just over 1300 runs at an average of just under 31, and Wisden noted that he "proved a reliable if somewhat slow run gatherer". The following year, though, he lost his place halfway through the season and though he reappeared towards the end, it was as a middle-order batsman rather than an opener.

In 1969, the arrival of Clive Lloyd meant more competition for batting places at Lancashire, and the county, under the captaincy of Jack Bond, embarked on a policy of concentrating on success in one-day cricket, where Atkinson's slow scoring and fielding limitations were shown up by a group of new and younger players. Atkinson played regularly in first-class matches until the middle of the season, but did not appear at all in the new John Player League, the Sunday one-day competition which Lancashire won in its first season. He was dropped from the side in mid July, and never appeared again in first-class cricket. He was 31 at the time.

== Later life ==
After his cricket career ended, Atkinson worked as the secretary of Salford rugby league club for several years, then managed the sports grounds at Manchester University. He died on 12 November 2015.
