= Somerset County Cricket Club in 1892 =

Somerset County Cricket Club
1892 season
- Captain: Herbie Hewett
- County Championship: 3rd
- Most runs: Herbie Hewett (1,047)
- Most wickets: Sammy Woods (85)
- Most catches: Sammy Woods (20)

In the 1892 season, Somerset County Cricket Club played their sixth season of first-class cricket, and participated in the County Championship for the second season. They finished third in the competition, two positions higher than in the previous year. Their captain, Herbie Hewett, completed the season as the club's leading run-scorer, topping 1,000 runs in the Championship. The all-rounder Sammy Woods took the most wickets for the county, with 85. A match was also played against Oxford, which was won by the student team.

== County Championship ==
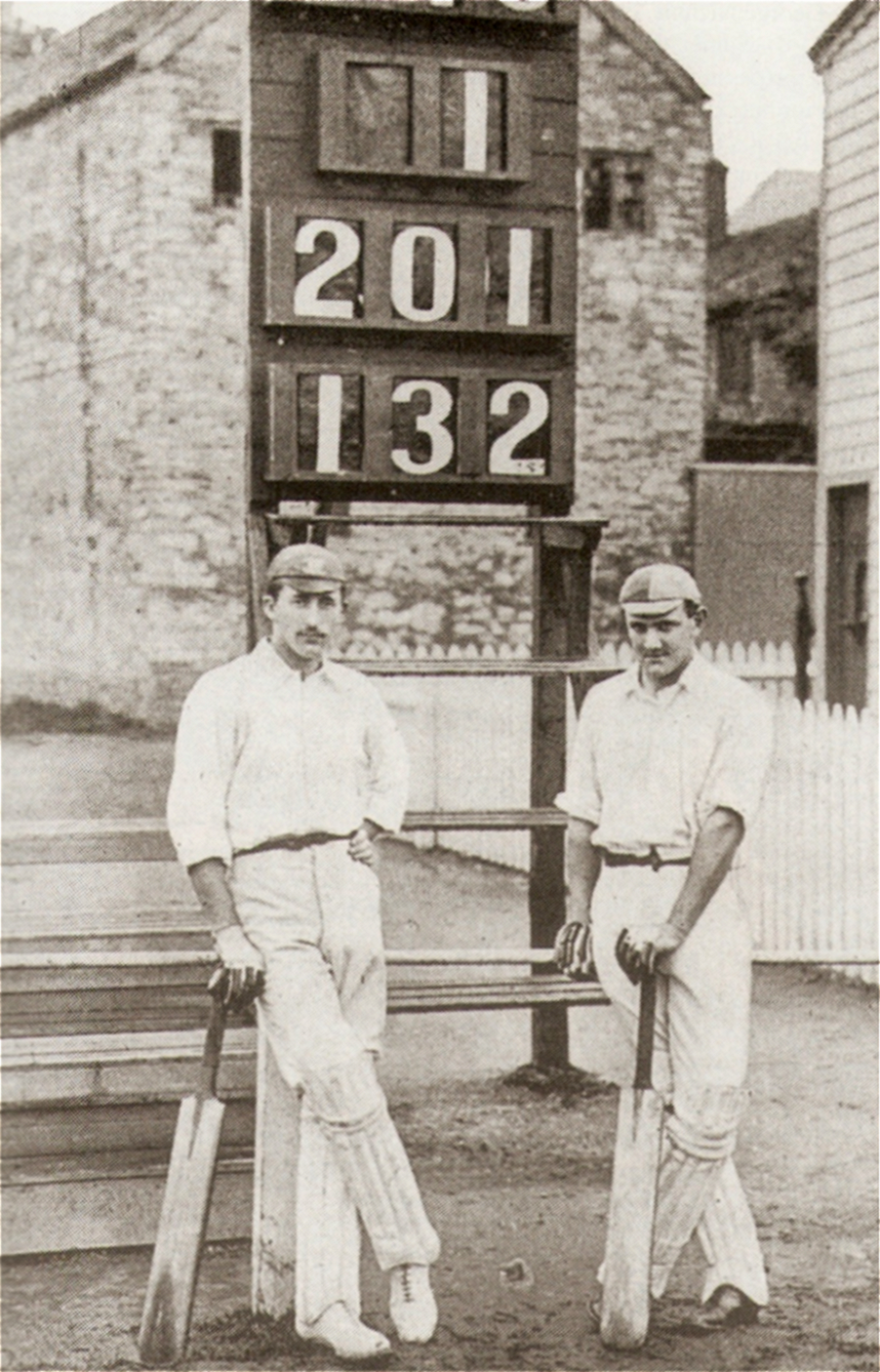
Lionel Palairet and Herbie Hewett after their record first-wicket partnership of 346 against Yorkshire

Playing their second season as members of the County Championship, Somerset played sixteen matches, of which they won eight and lost five. Each of the final three matches of the season were curtailed by at least a day because of rain, and ended in draws. Their performances were enough to rank them third among all counties in the standings, and in his history of Somerset cricket, David Foot describes it as the season that led to Somerset being taken seriously as a club. He praised the leadership of the club's captain, Herbie Hewett, who picked players on merit, rather than "the strength of his social charm and ability to drink into the early hours." Despite their general success, the county did suffer a heavy defeat to Lancashire in early August. After no play on the first day due to rain, Somerset lost the match on the second day, being bowled out twice for fewer than 100 runs. Against another northern county, they set a new record partnership for the first wicket in first-class cricket; Hewett and Lionel Palairet scored 346 runs together in three and a half hours against Yorkshire.

=== Season standings ===
Note: Pld = Played, W = Wins, L = Losses, D = Draws, Pts = Points.

County Championship
Team	Pld	W	L	D	Pts
Surrey (C)	16	13	2	1	11
Nottinghamshire	16	10	2	4	8
Somerset	16	8	5	3	3
Lancashire	16	7	5	4	2
Middlesex	16	7	6	3	1
Yorkshire	16	5	5	6	0
Gloucestershire	16	1	8	7	–7
Kent	16	2	9	5	–7
Sussex	16	1	12	3	–11

Notes:
Team marked (C) won the County Championship.

=== Match log and statistics ===
Match log
No.	Date	Opponents	Venue	Result	Ref
1	2–3 June	Surrey	Kennington Oval, London	Lost by 179 runs	
2	6–7 June	Middlesex	Lord's, London	Lost by 112 runs	
3	20–21 June	Kent	Private Banks Sports Ground, Catford	Won by 4 wickets	
4	23–25 June	Nottinghamshire	Trent Bridge, Nottingham	Lost by 6 wickets	
5	14–16 July	Gloucestershire	Ashley Down Ground, Bristol	Won by 7 wickets	
6	18–20 July	Lancashire	County Ground, Taunton	Won by 4 wickets	
7	21–22 July	Sussex	County Ground, Taunton	Won by 6 wickets	
8	25–26 July	Kent	County Ground, Taunton	Won by 8 wickets	
9	8–9 August	Lancashire	Old Trafford, Manchester	Lost by 8 wickets	
10	11–12 August	Yorkshire	Bramall Lane, Sheffield	Won by 87 runs	
11	15–17 August	Surrey	County Ground, Taunton	Lost by 186 runs	
12	18–19 August	Nottinghamshire	County Ground, Taunton	Won by an innings and 122 runs	
13	22–23 August	Middlesex	County Ground, Taunton	Won by 70 runs	
14	25–27 August	Yorkshire	County Ground, Taunton	Drawn	
15	29–31 August	Gloucestershire	County Ground, Taunton	Drawn	
16	1–3 September	Sussex	County Ground, Hove	Drawn	

Batting averages
Player	Matches	Innings	Runs	Average	Highest score	100s	50s
Herbie Hewett	16	27	1,047	40.26	201	1	9
Lionel Palairet	13	21	659	32.95	146	2	3
Coote Hedley	13	20	446	26.23	102	1	3
John Challen	11	17	335	22.33	72	0	1
Gerald Fowler	12	17	309	20.60	54	0	2
Vernon Hill	10	13	224	18.66	93	0	1
Sammy Woods	16	24	322	15.33	76	0	1
Qualification: 200 runs. Source: CricketArchive.

Bowling averages
Player	Matches	Balls	Wickets	Average	BBI	5wi	10wm
George Nichols	16	2,208	51	15.47	5/24	2	0
Coote Hedley	13	1,244	36	15.83	4/18	0	0
Ted Tyler	16	2,765	81	16.03	9/33	4	1
Sammy Woods	16	2,896	85	16.43	8/51	9	2
Qualification: 30 wickets. Source: CricketArchive.

== University match ==
Other matches
No.	Date	Opponents	Venue	Result	Ref
1	9–10 June	Oxford University	University Parks, Oxford	Lost by 7 wickets	

== Bibliography ==
- Roebuck, Peter. From Sammy to Jimmy: The Official History of Somerset County Cricket Club (1991 ed.). London: Partridge Press. ISBN 1-85225-085-2.
- Foot, David. Sunshine, Sixes and Cider: The History of Somerset Cricket (1986 ed.). Newton Abbot, Devon: David & Charles. ISBN 0-7153-8890-8.
