= Hallam Moseley =

West Indian cricketer

Personal information
- Full name: Hallam Reynold Moseley
- Born: 28 May 1948 (age 78); Christ Church, Barbados
- Batting: Right-handed
- Bowling: Right-arm fast-medium
- Role: Bowler

Domestic team information
- Years: Team
- 1969–1972: Barbados
- 1969–1982: Somerset
- FC debut: 20 August 1969 Barbados v Nottinghamshire
- Last FC: 11 September 1982 Somerset v Lancashire

Career statistics
Competition	First-class	List A
Matches	213	212
Runs scored	1,533	519
Batting average	12.46	8.23
100s/50s	0/2	0/0
Top score	67	33
Balls bowled	32,653	10,328
Wickets	557	313
Bowling average	24.53	19.91
5 wickets in innings	16	4
10 wickets in match	1	0
Best bowling	6/34	5/30
Catches/stumpings	78/–	37/–
- Source: CricketArchive, 21 September 2009

Hallam Reynold Moseley (born 28 May 1948) is a former first-class cricketer who played for Somerset and Barbados in a career spanning from 1969 to 1982. He was a right-arm fast-medium pace bowler who, in the opinion of Sir Garry Sobers, was never far away from a place in the West Indies team.

== Career ==
Touring England at the age of 21 with a team from his native Barbados, Moseley caught the eye of Bill Andrews, and with the recommendation of Sir Garry Sobers, he arrived in Taunton within a year. However, qualification problems were to delay his debut for Somerset until the fourth match of the 1971 John Player League. He provided good support for Allan Jones and Tom Cartwright, taking 19 one-day wickets at 20.26 in his first season. A particularly strong one-day bowler, Moseley led Somerset in wickets in the John Player League in 1973, 1975, 1977, 1978, 1980 and 1982, and appeared in the victory in the 1982 Benson & Hedges Cup final, though never quite showing the consistency needed to break into a West Indies squad already full of pacy seam bowlers.

His relationship with the fans was exceptional; a happy, smiling, bespectacled West Indian whose distinctive under-arm returns to the wicket-keeper drew whistles of admiration and envy, and whose batting exploits, while unsuccessful helped turn him into a local star. He received his county cap during his second season at Somerset. Moseley's later career suffered greatly with the two overseas players limitation, with Joel Garner and Viv Richards filling those slots whenever available.
