= Brian Roe =

English cricketer

Personal information
- Born: 27 January 1939; Cleethorpes, Lincolnshire, England
- Died: 28 June 2014 (aged 75); Barnstaple, Devon, England
- Batting: Right-handed
- Role: Opening batsman

Domestic team information
- Years: Team
- 1957–1966: Somerset
- FC debut: 24 July 1957 Somerset v Kent
- Last FC: 20 May 1966 Somerset v Leicestershire

Career statistics
Competition	First-class	List A
Matches	136	6
Runs scored	5,010	73
Batting average	22.26	12.16
100s/50s	4/25	0/0
Top score	128	30
Balls bowled	120	–
Wickets	2	–
Bowling average	52.00	–
5 wickets in innings	0	–
10 wickets in match	0	–
Best bowling	1/43	–
Catches/stumpings	44/–	0/–
- Source: CricketArchive, 13 September 2009

Brian Roe (27 January 1939 – 27 June 2014) was an English cricketer who played first-class cricket for Somerset between 1957 and 1966.

Roe was born at Cleethorpes, Lincolnshire. A diminutive and defensive right-handed batsman, he played mostly as an opener, and was a regular member of the Somerset side between 1961 and 1964. He scored 1,000 runs in three seasons from 1961 to 1963, reaching 1552 runs at an average of 26.30 in 1962. He made four first-class centuries, with the highest being 128 in the match against Essex at Brentwood in 1962. He was awarded his county cap in 1962.

In 1964, despite an unbeaten century against Lancashire at Bath, Roe was out of form and he was dropped from the side in July. He played a few matches in both 1965 and 1966 without regaining his form, and with competition for batting places high at Somerset with the return of Roy Virgin as an opener after National Service and the rise of Mervyn Kitchen, he left first-class cricket at the end of the 1966 season.

Roe moved to Minor Counties cricket with Devon and made one List A appearance for a Minor Counties South representative side against Somerset in 1973 in the Benson and Hedges Cup.
