= Mark Feltham (cricketer) =

English cricketer (born 1963)

Mark Andrew Feltham (born 26 June 1963) played first-class cricket for Surrey County Cricket Club and subsequently Middlesex County Cricket Club between 1983 and 1996.

An all-rounder, his right-arm medium-fast bowling was insufficiently penetrative for him to reach the highest level, as his career average of 31.64 for his 388 first-class wickets indicates. As a right-handed batsman, he scored 3199 runs at an average of 21.46, and managed only one century (101) in 197 innings.
