= Wilfrid Young =

English cricketer (1867–1947)

Personal information
- Full name: Wilfrid Alec Radford Young
- Born: 5 October 1867; Brighton, Sussex, England
- Died: 19 March 1947 (aged 79); Kimcote, Leicestershire, England
- Batting: Right-handed
- Bowling: Right-arm slow

Domestic team information
- Years: Team
- 1889–1893: Somerset
- First-class debut: 13 August 1891 Somerset v Surrey
- Last First-class: 24 July 1893 Somerset v Lancashire

Career statistics
Competition	FC
Matches	2
Runs scored	13
Batting average	4.33
100s/50s	0/0
Top score	13
Catches/stumpings	1/–
- Source: CricketArchive, 8 January 2011

The Reverend Wilfrid Alec Radford Young (5 October 1867 – 19 March 1947) played first-class cricket for Somerset in the period from 1889 to 1893 immediately before and after the side's elevation to first-class status. He was born at Brighton, Sussex, and died at the rectory at Kimcote, Leicestershire.

Young was educated at Harrow School and as a right-handed middle-order batsman and a right-arm slow bowler he played in the socially important Eton v Harrow cricket match at Lord's in three seasons from 1883 to 1885. He went to Selwyn College, Cambridge University, and played in a trial match for the Cambridge cricket team, but did not make any first-team appearances. He appeared for Somerset in several matches in the 1889 and 1890 seasons: Somerset was at this point a second-class county, and the success of the side in 1890 was a material factor in its elevation to first-class cricket status for the 1891 season, when it was allowed to compete in the County Championship. Young only appeared twice in first-class matches for Somerset, once in each of the 1891 and 1893 seasons, and he did not bowl in either of them. His only runs came in the 1891 match: he scored 13 against Surrey. In his 1893 game against Lancashire he failed to score in either innings.

He became a parson in the Church of England and his final post was as rector of Kimcote, where he died in 1947.
