= Keith Dutch =

English cricketer (born 1973)

Personal information
- Full name: Keith Philip Dutch
- Born: 21 March 1973 (age 53); Harrow, London, England
- Batting: Right-handed
- Bowling: Right-arm off break

Domestic team information
- Years: Team
- 1993–2000: Middlesex
- 2001–2004: Somerset
- FC debut: 5 August 1993 Middlesex v Leicestershire
- Last FC: 21 July 2004 Somerset v Yorkshire
- LA debut: 16 July 1995 Middlesex v Warwickshire
- Last LA: 24 August 2004 Somerset v Middlesex

Career statistics
Competition	FC	LA	T20
Matches	72	168	10
Runs scored	1,868	2,367	291
Batting average	20.30	20.58	32.33
100s/50s	1/11	0/9	0/1
Top score	118	93	70
Balls bowled	7,773	5,890	132
Wickets	115	159	5
Bowling average	36.40	29.27	32.80
5 wickets in innings	3	2	0
10 wickets in match	0	0	0
Best bowling	6/62	6/40	2/14
Catches/stumpings	72/–	67/–	3/–
- Source: CricketArchive, 19 October 2010

Keith Philip Dutch (born 21 March 1973) is a former English cricketer who played eight seasons at Middlesex County Cricket Club and four at Somerset. He was primarily a one-day cricketer, appearing in over twice as many List A cricket matches as first-class cricket. He played as a all-rounder, though during his time at Middlesex he made irregular appearances, and did not claim his first five-wicket haul in a match until his final year at the county in 2000. His move to Somerset brought him some rewards: a more regular place in the team, and his maiden (and only) century. His first-class opportunities became increasingly limited, and at the end of 2005, after not appearing all season, he turned down a contract extension and ended his professional cricket career.

Dutch finished his career on a high nonetheless. His final championship bowling innings was a 5-fer, including the wicket of Darren Lehmann, and his final List A over wicket was Andrew Strauss.
