= Martin Weston =

English cricketer (born 1959)

Martin John Weston (born 8 April 1959 in Worcester) is an English retired professional cricketer who played for Worcestershire from 1979 to 1995.
