= Tom Young (cricketer) =

English first-class cricket player

Personal information
- Full name: Archibald Young
- Born: 6 November 1890; Bathwick, Bath, Somerset, England
- Died: 2 April 1936 (aged 45); Odd Down, Bath, Somerset, England
- Batting: Right-handed
- Bowling: Right-arm off-spin
- Role: All-rounder

Domestic team information
- Years: Team
- 1911–1933: Somerset
- FC debut: 24 August 1911 Somerset v Worcestershire
- Last FC: 1 September 1933 Somerset v Nottinghamshire

Career statistics
Competition	First-class
Matches	312
Runs scored	13,159
Batting average	25.45
100s/50s	11/63
Top score	198
Balls bowled	25,905
Wickets	388
Bowling average	25.58
5 wickets in innings	9
10 wickets in match	2
Best bowling	8/30
Catches/stumpings	216/–
- Source: CricketArchive, 7 December 2008

Archibald Young, known as "Tom", was a professional first-class cricketer who appeared for Somerset in more than 300 matches. Though a regular cricketer for a dozen years, he was frequently in poor health because of damage to his lungs during the First World War and he died at the age of 45, less than three years after his most successful cricket season.

== Early cricket career ==
Young, a right-handed batsman often used as an opener and a right-arm slow spin bowler, was born at Bathwick in Bath on 6 November 1890, and first appeared for Somerset in three matches in 1911, making little impact. He reappeared again in two matches in 1919, again to no great effect. In 1921, however, he was given 10 matches and made useful runs, including his first score of more than 50, an unbeaten 69 in the match against Essex at Southend, when he also took wickets that helped to win the game.

== County regular ==
From 1922 to 1933, Young was a regular member of the Somerset side. He was, says a history of Somerset cricket, "a laconic and frail man", yet despite the damage done to his lungs in France during the First World War he missed very few games over the 12 seasons.

Initially, he played largely as a batsman, usually opening. In 1922, he made 881 runs, and in every other season he went on to more than 900 runs, passing the 1,000 runs for the season five times. His first century came in 1923 against a weak Glamorgan side at Taunton, when he put on 251 for the second wicket with Jack MacBryan, who made 148. A year later, he made 198 against Hampshire at Bath, the major contribution in what was, at that stage, Somerset's highest-ever first-class total. The innings remained Young's highest score in first-class cricket. He was picked twice to represent the professionals in Gentlemen v Players matches, once at Folkestone and once at The Oval.

== All-rounder ==
Up to 1930, Young was regarded as primarily a batsman who bowled a bit. This was, says Somerset's cricket history, "an astonishing oversight" by successive captains, John Daniell and Jack White. But in 1930 his bowling was finally discovered: he took 66 wickets in County Championship matches alone at an average of 18 apiece, and 71 wickets in all. This was, wrote Wisden, "a truly remarkable improvement upon what he had previously accomplished in that department of the game". Against Derbyshire at Taunton in August 1930, he made scores of 63 and 70 as an opening batsman, and then took three for 47 and eight for 30 to finish with match figures of 11 for 77. After Young had taken five for 70 in the match against the Australian touring team, including the wickets of Donald Bradman, Archie Jackson, Stan McCabe and Vic Richardson, Bradman is reported to have remarked: "What a good off-spinner he is." Bradman and Jackson had both scored centuries before Young took their wickets, though.

Young was awarded a benefit match in the 1930 season, and picked the game against Sussex at Bath: rain interfered badly with play on the Saturday, delayed the resumption on Monday until mid-afternoon, and then prevented any play at all on the Tuesday. The gate receipts were £62 and the match yielded him only £100 in total, but further collections across the summer boosted the benefit fund to £750.

Though by now over 40 years old, Young sustained both his batting and his bowling performance across 1931 and 1932, and in 1933 had his best all-round season, with 951 runs which included three centuries for the first time in any season and 90 wickets. He took 10 wickets in a match for the second time in his career in the game against Worcestershire at Stourbridge. Along with Arthur Wellard, Wisden said, Young "formed the backbone of the team" in 1933.

== End of career and death ==
But that was that. The 1935 Wisden reported on Young's absence as a factor in a weaker Somerset team in the 1934 season, and noted that he had been added to the list of first-class umpires for the 1935 season. The 1936 Wisden said that, "owing to illness", Young had not stood as an umpire in any first-class matches in 1935 and had withdrawn from the umpires list for 1936. In fact, Young died at his home in Bath on 2 April 1936 just before the cricket season started. He was 45.

== Character ==
Illness is cited in Somerset's history as a potential reason why Young was seen as a "moody and intimidating" cricketer by his fellow players. Younger left-arm spinner Horace Hazell is quoted as saying: "I admired him – he was good for us. Tom was very strict and didn't approve of us signing autographs outside the Oval. He didn't want us getting big ideas too quickly." All-rounder Bill Andrews is reported as having asked Young why, after making 32 opening the innings against Larwood and Voce in a match against Nottinghamshire, he had kept his pads on. Young allegedly replied: "Waste of time taking 'em off, son. We'll be soon bloody well in again."
