= Talbot Lewis =

English cricketer and footballer

Personal information
- Full name: Albert Edward Lewis
- Born: 20 January 1877; Bedminster, Somerset, England
- Died: 22 February 1956 (aged 79); Southmead, Bristol, England
- Batting: Right-handed
- Bowling: Right-arm fast-medium
- Role: All-rounder

Domestic team information
- Years: Team
- 1899–1914: Somerset
- FC debut: 11 May 1899 Somerset v Yorkshire
- Last FC: 13 August 1914 Somerset v Worcestershire

Career statistics
Competition	First-class
Matches	210
Runs scored	7,745
Batting average	21.45
100s/50s	9/32
Top score	201*
Balls bowled	25,615
Wickets	522
Bowling average	23.19
5 wickets in innings	39
10 wickets in match	5
Best bowling	8/103
Catches/stumpings	107/–
- Source: CricketArchive, 18 October 2009

Talbot Lewis
Personal information
- Position: Goalkeeper

Senior career*
Years	Team	Apps	(Gls)
1896–1897	Bedminster		
1897–1898	Bristol City		
1898–1899	Everton	0	(0)
1899–1901	Bristol City		
1901–1902	Walsall		
1902–1904	Sheffield United	15	(0)
1904–1905	Sunderland	4	(0)
1905–1906	Luton Town		
1906–1907	Leicester Fosse	38	(0)
1907–1908	Bristol City	21	(0)
Total		78	(0)
- * Club domestic league appearances and goals

Albert Edward Lewis (20 January 1877 – 22 February 1956), known as Talbot Lewis, was an English first-class cricketer who played for Somerset between 1899 and 1912. He reappeared for Somerset in one match after the start of the First World War in August 1914, although he played under an assumed name, A. Key.

An allrounder, Lewis was a middle to lower order batsman and right-arm fast-medium pace bowler. He scored 9 first-class hundreds, his highest was an unbeaten 201 against Kent in 1909 after he'd made a duck in his first innings. Somerset followed on and Lewis's innings earned them a draw. With the ball he took over 500 wickets for Somerset and took his best innings bowling figures of 8 for 103 against Warwickshire in 1908, finishing the match with 14 wickets.

== Football career ==
Lewis also played professional football as a goalkeeper with Sheffield United, Sunderland, Leicester Fosse and Bristol City amongst others.
