= Edward Lock =

English cricketer

Personal information
- Full name: Edward John Lock
- Born: 21 November 1868; Taunton, Somerset, England
- Died: 3 May 1949 (aged 80); Taunton, Somerset, England
- Role: Batsman

Domestic team information
- Years: Team
- 1889–1893: Somerset
- FC debut: 9 July 1891 Somerset v Lancashire
- Last FC: 6 July 1893 Somerset v Yorkshire

Career statistics
Competition	First-class
Matches	2
Runs scored	16
Batting average	5.33
100s/50s	0/0
Top score	10
Catches/stumpings	0/–
- Source: CricketArchive, 10 January 2010

Edward John Lock (21 November 1868 – 3 May 1949) was an English cricketer who made two first-class appearances for Somerset between 1891 and 1893. He also played three matches for the club which were considered 'second-class' matches, when Somerset had their first-class status removed from 1886 to 1890. Although his highest first-class score was 10, made against Lancashire in 1891, he had made 41 the previous season against Glamorgan, in a match not considered first-class.
