= Peter Denning (cricketer) =

English cricketer

Personal information
- Full name: Peter William Denning
- Born: 16 December 1949; Chewton Mendip, Somerset, England
- Died: 17 July 2007 (aged 57); Taunton, Somerset, England
- Nickname: Dasher
- Batting: Left-handed
- Bowling: Right-arm offbreak
- Role: Opening batsman

Domestic team information
- Years: Team
- 1969–1984: Somerset
- FC debut: 28 June 1969 Somerset v Glamorgan
- Last FC: 30 June 1984 Somerset v Northants
- LA debut: 6 July 1969 Somerset v Lancashire
- Last LA: 9 September 1984 Somerset v Notts

Career statistics
Competition	First-class	List A
Matches	269	280
Runs scored	11,559	6,792
Batting average	28.68	28.06
100s/50s	8/69	5/32
Top score	184	145
Balls bowled	157	21
Wickets	1	0
Bowling average	96.00	–
5 wickets in innings	0	–
10 wickets in match	0	–
Best bowling	1/4	–
Catches/stumpings	132/–	94/–
- Source: CricketArchive, 13 October 2009

Peter William Denning (16 December 1949 – 17 July 2007) was an English first-class cricketer who played for Somerset County Cricket Club between 1969 and 1984. He was known to Somerset cricket fans as 'Dasher' due to his "pace over the ground", and he was also known for an unorthodox stroke called the 'Chewton carve' or 'Chewton chop', a stroke that cut the ball away between the slips and the covers. Denning was a left-handed top order (often opening) batsman and scored 1,000 runs in a season on six occasions.

== Cricket career ==
Denning was born in the village of Chewton Mendip in Somerset, where his father was the butcher. He was educated at Millfield, where he was captain of cricket and also played tennis, rugby and football. He later studied at St Luke's College, Exeter (now part of the University of Exeter), and qualified as a teacher.

He made his first-class cricket debut for Somerset against Glamorgan in June 1969. He played much of his career as an opener in partnership with Brian Rose.

He joined Somerset when they were struggling. However, Somerset later became a strong one-day side with Brian Close as captain and a team containing three world-class players in Viv Richards, Ian Botham and Joel Garner. He was awarded his Somerset cap in 1973. He made his top score, 184, against Nottinghamshire at Trent Bridge. He hit two centuries in the match against Gloucestershire in 1977, and his 145 in a one-day game against Glamorgan in 1978.

His most prolific year came in 1979, when he made 1,222 runs at a batting average of 42.13. It was a memorable year for Somerset as well as they won the Gillette Cup and Sunday League under Rose's captaincy. Denning was a good limited overs player having the ability to run quick singles. The following year, in partnership with Ian Botham, he added 310 for the fourth wicket against Gloucestershire at Taunton in 1980.

He was a member of the Somerset team that won the NatWest Trophy in 1983. He won seven man-of-the-match awards in the one-day game. Denning retired in 1984 after suffering problems with a cartilage and became a grain merchant in Somerset.

Denning died of cancer in Taunton in 2007. He is survived by his wife and two daughters. Brian Rose, Denning's former opening partner and Somerset Director of Cricket paid the following tribute to his former teammate: "To me Peter epitomised all that should be good in a professional cricketer. He was hard, stubborn and made it difficult for the opposition – especially when he growled at them. His sad death is a tremendous loss to Somerset cricket."
