= Adrian Jones (cricketer) =

English cricketer

Personal information
- Full name: Adrian Nicholas Jones
- Born: 22 July 1961 (age 65); Woking, Surrey, England
- Nickname: Jonah
- Batting: Left-handed
- Bowling: Right-arm fast
- Role: Bowler

Domestic team information
- Years: Team
- 1981–1993: Sussex
- 1981/82: Border
- 1987–1990: Somerset
- First-class debut: 10 June 1981 Sussex v Cambridge University
- Last First-class: 5 July 1993 Sussex v Somerset
- List A debut: 5 July 1981 Sussex v Gloucestershire
- Last List A: 11 July 1993 Sussex v Glamorgan

Career statistics
Competition	First-class	List A
Matches	175	154
Runs scored	1037	316
Batting average	11.39	12.64
100s/50s	–/–	–/–
Top score	43*	37
Balls bowled	22912	6473
Wickets	410	230
Bowling average	32.96	22.18
5 wickets in innings	12	5
10 wickets in match	1	–
Best bowling	7/30	7/41
Catches/stumpings	42/–	24/–
- Source: CricketArchive, 13 November 2010

Adrian Nicholas Jones (born 22 July 1961) is a former cricketer who played first-class and List A cricket for Sussex and Somerset in the English game from 1981 to 1993 and for Border cricket team in South Africa in 1981/82. He was born at Woking, Surrey and educated at Seaford College in Sussex.

Jones was a pugnacious right-arm fast-medium bowler and a tail-end left-handed batsman.

== Sussex cricketer ==
Jones made his Sussex debut in 1981 and in his fourth first-class match took the wickets of Graeme Wood, Trevor Chappell and Kim Hughes in a return of four for 68 against the Australians. On the strength of that performance he was brought into the England Youth team less than two weeks later to play in the third Youth "Test" against the Indian Youth team. In the winter of 1981–82, Jones was in South Africa where he made two appearances for the weak Border team in matches in the SAB Bowl competition, both of which were lost by an innings. There were few first-class games and few wickets for Jones in the 1982 and 1983 seasons, and he played in only one List A match in each of the two seasons (and was not used as a bowler in his one one-day match in 1982).

But in the second half of the 1984 season, he began playing fairly regularly for the Sussex first team, and against Gloucestershire he took five second innings wickets for 29 runs: this would prove to be his best bowling performance for Sussex. In both 1985 and 1986, Jones played in around half of Sussex's first-class matches, but in a county which boasted Test players Imran Khan and Tony Pigott, as well as Garth Le Roux among its bowlers, his place was never assured, and he was injured for part of the 1986 season. He was a more regular player in 1986 in List A limited overs matches, and in the game against Nottinghamshire in May 1986 in the 40-over Sunday League competition, he took seven for 41 (out of eight Notts wickets that fell). These were not only the best List A figures of Jones's career, but they remain as of 2010 the best figures in a List A by a Sussex cricketer. Despite being awarded his Sussex county cap in 1986, he left the county at the end of the season and joined Somerset for 1987.

== Somerset player ==
Jones joined the Somerset side at a point of maximum turmoil when the contracts of overseas players Viv Richards and Joel Garner had been terminated and Ian Botham had resigned. He immediately got a regular place in the first team and remained there for the next four seasons. In 1987, he was awarded his county cap and took 63 first-class wickets at an average of 28.57. His best return was a new career-best: seven for 85 in the match against Nottinghamshire at Trent Bridge when, with three second innings wickets, he also took 10 wickets in a match for the only time in his career.

Jones's record for Somerset over the next two seasons was consistent: 55 first-class wickets in 1988 and 71 in 1989, his highest aggregate. In 1988, in the match against Hampshire he took the first seven first-innings wickets in 12 overs at a personal cost of 18 runs, and his eventual figures of seven for 30 would be the best of his first-class career. In 1989, with other Somerset bowlers injured, Eric Hill's notes for Wisden recorded Jones "playing in every match in spite of some injuries and occasional trouble with some authorities for his huge enthusiasm to get rid of batsmen". In all matches in 1989, he took 116 wickets. A hot summer and four-day cricket in 1990 contributed to Jones's average climbing to more than 36 runs per wicket, but he took more than 50 wickets again in first-class cricket. But at the end of the 1990 season he turned down a further contract from Somerset and moved back to Sussex for 1991.

== Back to Sussex ==
Jones rejoined Sussex in 1991 and had similar success to what he had achieved with Somerset. He took 57 wickets in first-class matches and a further 31 in List A games. But he was restricted by injuries in both 1992 and 1993 and after a lack of success in 1993 he retired from the first-class game.
