= Coote Hedley =

Sir Walter Coote Hedley
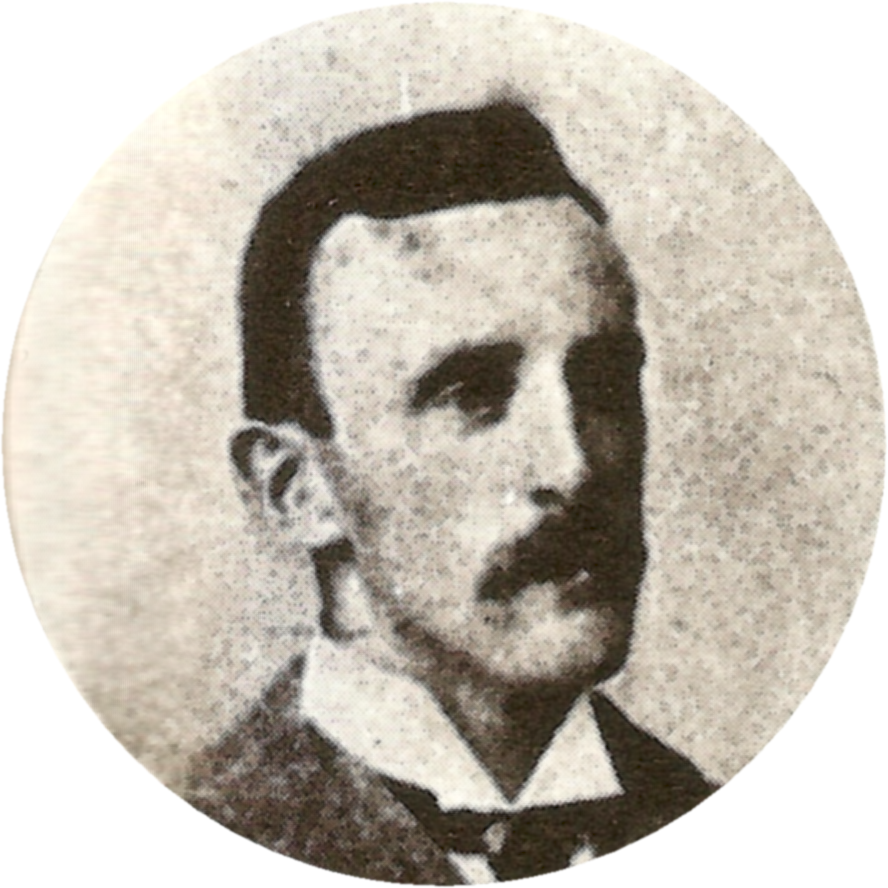
- Born: 12 December 1865; Heathfield, Somerset, England
- Died: 27 December 1937 (aged 72); Sunningdale, Berkshire, England
- Relatives: James Fellowes (father-in-law)
- Military career
- Allegiance: United Kingdom
- Branch: British Army
- Service years: 1884–1920
- Rank: Colonel
- Unit: Royal Engineers
- Commands: MO4
- Conflicts: Second Boer War; First World War
- Awards: Order of the British Empire, Order of the Bath, Order of St Michael and St George
- Other work: Amateur first-class cricketer, rackets player and golfer
- Cricket career

Cricket information
- Batting: Right-handed
- Bowling: Right-arm fast-medium

Domestic team information
- Years: Team
- 1886–1904: Somerset
- 1888: Kent
- 1890–1893: Marylebone Cricket Club
- 1902: Devon
- 1905: Hampshire

Career statistics
Competition	First-class
Matches	103
Runs scored	2,834
Batting average	17.28
100s/50s	2/13
Top score	102
Balls bowled	14,299
Wickets	343
Bowling average	19.32
5 wickets in innings	23
10 wickets in match	5
Best bowling	8/18
Catches/stumpings	76/–
- Source: Cricinfo, 23 February 2010

Sir Walter Coote Hedley KBE CB CMG (12 December 1865 – 27 December 1937) was a British Army officer who began his career in the Royal Engineers and later moved into military intelligence. He was also a gifted amateur sportsman who played first-class cricket for several County Championship teams and competed to a high level in rackets and golf.

Hedley was commissioned into the Royal Engineers in 1884. He became a surveyor in the 1890s and was attached to the Ordnance Survey. This work was interrupted by service in South Africa throughout the Second Boer War, and from 1906 to 1908 by his appointment as an advisor to the Survey of India. In 1911 he was appointed to command MO4, also known as the Geographical Section of the General Staff. During the First World War this organisation was responsible for producing all the maps required by British Empire forces around the world, and in particular mapping the ever-changing trench system on the Western Front. Following the end of the war, he retired from the army in 1920. He was also a Fellow of the Royal Geographical Society and served on the society's council.

Hedley's first-class cricket career began in 1888 with the Gentlemen of England and Kent. The majority of his county matches were for Somerset whom he first represented in 1886 in non-first-class games. His first County Championship games for them were in 1892, and he had a regular place in the team from June of that year. Hedley was also a useful rackets player—reaching the final of the amateur championships, held at the Queen's Club, in 1890. In later life he turned to golf, playing off a scratch handicap.

== Early life ==
Hedley was born at Monkton Heathfield near Taunton in Somerset on 12 December 1865. His father, Robert, had served as a captain in the British Army and was a Poor Law Inspector at the time of Hedley's birth. His mother Catherine's maiden name was Coote which he adopted as his usual forename later in life. He was educated at Marlborough College, winning a Modern school scholarship in his first term and was a college prefect.

== Military career ==
On leaving school, Hedley entered the Royal Military Academy (RMA) at Woolwich in March 1883. He was commissioned into the Royal Engineers (RE) as a lieutenant on 9 December 1884, serving initially at the School of Military Engineering at Chatham in Kent before being posted to Shorncliffe with 30 Field Company. He served in Gibraltar between 1890 and 1895 as adjutant of 6 Fortress Company and was promoted captain on 17 January 1894, taking charge of 20 Fortress Company. A report in The Times in 1890, on the final of the rackets amateur championship at Queen's Club already refers to him as "Captain W. C. Hedley" and a history of 20 Survey Company RE published by the Royal Engineers Museum lists him as captain and officer commanding from 1893. In October 1899 he briefly moved to 19 Survey Company. From 1895 he was attached to the Ordnance Survey.

=== Second Boer War ===
The outbreak of the Second Boer War in 1899 took Hedley to South Africa with 17 Field Company. One of the biggest problems facing the British was the lack of suitable maps, so his surveying experience was in demand. He arrived in South Africa in November 1899, he was present at the Relief of Ladysmith, and was mentioned in despatches in a despatch dated 30 March 1900, though this was not gazetted until February 1901. The same Gazette carried a further mention in a despatch dated 9 November 1900. He had been hospitalised earlier in 1900, and was discharged to return to duty in the week ending 18 May 1900. He received a third mention in September 1901 for service up to April 1901. On 9 July 1901 he left Port Natal on the transport SS City of Cambridge which was due to arrive at Southampton on 3 August. His obituary in The Times records that he served in the war until 1902, so he may have returned at a later date. In September 1901, it was gazetted that he had received a brevet promotion to major on 29 November 1900; substantive promotion to that rank came on 18 January 1902. He also received the Queen's South Africa Medal, with six clasps, for his service during the war.

=== Survey of India ===
Hedley returned to 19 Company once the war was over, and remained with them until 1903, continuing in surveying duties with the Ordnance Survey until 1906. He was then appointed as an advisor to the Survey of India in order to modernise map production methods, following efforts by the previous Viceroy of India, George Curzon, 1st Marquess Curzon of Kedleston, to reform the Survey. Although Hedley faced some resistance to the proposals he made, he was ultimately successful in achieving reform and the Geodetic & Research Branch of the Survey of India still holds in its archives, Notes on the organization, methods and process of the photo-litho office, Calcutta by Major W. C. Hedley. He returned to the United Kingdom, and the Ordnance Survey, in 1908, now concentrating on new colour printing techniques. He was promoted to lieutenant-colonel in May 1910.

=== General Staff and First World War ===
Hedley was appointed a General Staff Officer, Grade 1 at the War Office on 20 September 1911, and took command of the Geographical Section General Staff, known as MO4. The MO prefix stood for "Military Operations" and in 1916 would be changed to "Military Intelligence". Hedley succeeded Charles Close, who had been appointed Director General of the Ordnance Survey. The duties of the department were to provide to the British Army maps of all areas of the world—other than the United Kingdom, for which the Ordnance Survey was responsible, and India, which was the responsibility of the India Office, via the Survey of India. Its remit also extended to advising government departments on geographical matters, particularly relating to international boundaries.

In preparation for a possible war in Europe, Hedley directed that maps of France and Flanders be produced and stock-piled and that survey work should be carried out in strategically important locations such as Palestine and the Balkans. A mobile map printing section was also established prior to the break out of the First World War, with Hedley drawing on his experiences providing maps in South Africa where the ability to produce maps locally had proved vital. He was promoted to colonel in December 1913, and remained the technical advisor and manager for MI4 at the War Office throughout the First World War, being influential in encouraging the development of sound ranging to survey enemy artillery positions.

Hedley was appointed Companion of the Order of the Bath in the 1915 Birthday Honours, Companion of the Order of St Michael and St George in the 1917 Birthday Honours, and Knight Commander of the Order of the British Empire in October 1919. He also received the Legion d'Honneur, Ordre de Léopold, and Officier of the Ordre de la Couronne as a result of his war service and retired in December 1920, having reached the upper age limit for service.

== Cricket career ==
Hedley played cricket whilst at the RMA and for the Royal Engineers Cricket Club. He first played for Somerset in 1886 before the team had first-class status before making his first-class cricket debut for the Gentlemen of England against Cambridge University in 1888. After playing a second match for the Gentlemen against Oxford University, Hedley made his first-class county debut later in the same season for Kent against Gloucestershire at Blackheath, with him representing Kent in two further matches during 1888. After he took 14 Middlesex wickets at Lord's, doubts were expressed about his delivery. With Lord Harris, who captained Kent and was a key force within cricket, "striving to stamp out unfair bowling", Hedley's action was assessed by an independent observer in his next county match, and as a result, he did not play again for Kent.

He played for I Zingari against the Gentlemen of England three years running from 1888 as part of the Scarborough Festival and for Marylebone Cricket Club, before becoming a regular in the Somerset team in 1892. Hedley played 84 first-class matches for Somerset from 1892 to 1904, with his final first-class match for the county coming against Hampshire. He scored 2,395 runs for Somerset at a batting average of 18.14, with two centuries and a high score of 102 against Yorkshire in 1892, and took 254 wickets at an average of 20.77 runs, including 14 five wicket hauls, three ten wicket hauls and best figures of eight for 18 against Yorkshire in 1895. His service in South Africa during the Second Boer War meant that he did not play at all for the county between the end of the 1899 season and the start of the 1903 season. His bowling action was again the subject of discussion in December 1900, when the county captains met to discuss unfair bowling. As a result, Hedley was one of eight cricketers banned from bowling in county cricket in the 1901 season.

In 1902, Hedley played for Devon in three Minor Counties Championship matches and was awarded a Devon county cap. In 1905 Hedley, then working at Southampton for the Ordnance Survey, joined Hampshire, playing three times for the county during the season before serving in India from 1906. He made a total of 103 appearances in first-class cricket, taking 343 wickets at an average of 19.32; amongst these were 23 five wicket hauls, with him taking ten wickets in a match on five occasions. With the bat, he scored 2,834 runs at an average of 17.28; he made two centuries, with a highest score of 102. Wisden described him as a "free batsman with good style" and a "smart fieldsman".

== Family ==
Hedley married Anna Susan Fellowes in 1894 at Gibraltar Cathedral. Her father, James Fellowes, was a colonel in the RE who had worked at the Ordnance Survey and played first-class cricket for Kent in the 1870s. The couple had three daughters: Rosalind who married Henry Frank Heywood, Kathleen, and Christian Elizabeth Ann who married Cecil De Sauzmerez, of Sausmarez Manor in Guernsey.

== Later life ==
After retiring in 1920, Hedley was a Fellow of the Royal Geographical Society. He served on the society's council. He remained involved in cricket, and in 1926 wrote a letter to the editor of The Times, suggesting that a change be made to the leg before wicket law in order to prevent high-scoring matches, an opinion he reiterated in another letter to that paper in 1928. He died in December 1937 at his home in Sunningdale in Berkshire, aged 72.
