= Tom Cartwright =

English cricketer (1935–2007)

Personal information
- Full name: Thomas William Cartwright
- Born: 22 July 1935; Alderman's Green, Coventry, England
- Died: 30 April 2007 (aged 71); Neath, Glamorgan, Wales
- Nickname: Nail
- Batting: Right-handed
- Bowling: Right-hand medium

International information
- National side: England
- Test debut (cap 424): 23 July 1964 v Australia
- Last Test: 5 August 1965 v South Africa

Domestic team information
- Years: Team
- 1952–1969: Warwickshire
- 1970–1976: Somerset
- 1977: Glamorgan

Career statistics
| Competition | Test | FC | LA |
|---|---|---|---|
| Matches | 5 | 479 | 144 |
| Runs scored | 26 | 13,710 | 1,254 |
| Batting average | 5.20 | 21.32 | 14.41 |
| 100s/50s | 0/0 | 7/66 | 0/1 |
| Top score | 9 | 210 | 61 |
| Balls bowled | 1,611 | 84,837 | 7,491 |
| Wickets | 15 | 1,536 | 172 |
| Bowling average | 36.26 | 19.11 | 20.23 |
| 5 wickets in innings | 1 | 94 | 0 |
| 10 wickets in match | 0 | 18 | 0 |
| Best bowling | 6/94 | 8/39 | 4/7 |
| Catches/stumpings | 2/– | 331/– | 52/– |
- Source: CricketArchive, 25 January 2009

Thomas William Cartwright MBE (22 July 1935 – 30 April 2007) was an English cricketer. Playing largely for Somerset and Warwickshire, he took over 1,600 wickets as a medium-pace bowler, though he began his career as a top-order batsman, and was capable enough with the bat to score seven hundreds including a double-century. He played in five Tests for England in 1964 and 1965. His withdrawal from the 1968–69 tour to South Africa led to his replacement in the touring team by Basil D'Oliveira, whose inclusion precipitated the sporting isolation of South Africa until apartheid was abolished.

Cricket writer, Colin Bateman, stated, "Cartwright was an exceptional bowler whose talents could not find a niche in the England side, much to the discredit of the selectors. His high, flowing action off a few steady paces produced unerring accuracy and nip for his rich assortment of seam and swing deliveries, but England looked usually for a first change bowler with extra pace". He became a coach in later life at Millfield School, and later for Wales, as well as a manager at Glamorgan, with whom he had concluded his player career in 1977. He died there in 2007 of a heart attack.

== Life and career ==
Cartwright was born in Alderman's Green, Coventry, in a miner's cottage with no running water. He was the last of four children, with three older sisters. His Methodist father worked in the Riley car factory; his mother's father was a coal miner. He inherited strong socialist views from his parents, and a strong sense of personal integrity. He was educated at Foxford School, a secondary school in Coventry, and captained his school and the Coventry's schools teams in football and cricket. He took trials as a right-winger at Aston Villa, but began working at the Rootes car factory.

He joined Warwickshire in 1952, aged 17. He began his cricket career as a batsman, preferring to open the batting, became an all-rounder, batting further down the order, and ended as a bowler. He was very successful in first-class cricket, playing for Warwickshire from 1952 to 1969, for Somerset from 1970 to 1976, and for Glamorgan in 1977.

He made his first-class debut in Warwickshire's last county championship match of the 1952 season, against Nottinghamshire, scoring 82 and 22 not out. This remains the highest county score by a player aged under 17½. He did National Service from 1953 to 1955 in the Royal Artillery at Shoeburyness. In 1955, he played for the Army against the Navy at Lord's, and for the Combined Services against Lancashire, scoring three half-centuries in the two matches.

He scored seven first-class centuries, including 210 against Middlesex in 1962. He took 100 wickets in eight seasons, and passed 1,000 runs in three seasons. He achieving the all-rounder's "double" in 1962, taking 106 wickets and making 1176 runs. In 1965, he took 100 wickets at an average of 13.85. He won the Gillette Cup with Warwickshire in 1966 and 1968.

He made his Test debut in the Fourth Test against Australia at Old Trafford in July 1964, when Australian captain Bob Simpson reached a triple century. Both teams scored over 600 in their first innings and the match was drawn. Cartwright took 2–118 in 77 overs, including 32 maidens. He continued in the Fifth Test at the Oval, taking 3–110 in 62 overs, including 23 maidens. He toured in the winter of 1964/65, but broke a metatarsal bone and was unable to play until the Fourth Test against South Africa at Johannesburg. He was selected for the First Test against New Zealand at Edgbaston the following summer, but was then injured again and missed the next few matches. He achieved his best Test bowling figures (6–94) in his final Test appearance, when he returned for the Second Test against South Africa at Trent Bridge later in 1965. He broke his right thumb attempting to take a catch off his own bowling in the first innings, and he was unable to bowl in the second innings. He never played Test cricket again.

He was selected for the 1968/9 tour to South Africa, but a shoulder injury caused him to withdraw at the last minute. Basil D'Oliveira was selected to take his place, and the resulting controversy led to South Africa's exclusion from Test cricket for twenty two years.

Cartwright took 8–96 in his final match for Warwickshire in 1969. Worried about his future career, he sought a coaching position at Warwickshire before moving to Somerset to take up a coaching job at Millfield School. He became coach at Somerset, where he played with a young Ian Botham, helping him to develop his swing bowling. He left Somerset after an argument about his fitness in 1976, and played for Glamorgan the following year before finally retiring from playing to concentrate on coaching.

After he retired from professional cricket, he was cricket manager at Glamorgan from 1977 to 1983. He became coach for the Welsh Cricket Association and then the first Welsh national coach. For this work, he was awarded the MBE when he retired in 2000. He also became the first cricket coach to join the National Coaching Federation's Hall of Fame. He took charge of the development of under-16 cricketers for many years, continuing until 2007.

Aged 70, he played his last game of cricket at Broadhalfpenny Down in September 2005.

Cartwright suffered a heart attack in March 2007, and died a month later. He was survived by his Welsh wife, Joan Rees, whom he married in 1960, and by their son and daughter. Joan died on 28 March 2017.

A biography, Tom Cartwright: The Flame Still Burns, by Stephen Chalke was published in April 2007.
