= Allan Jones (cricketer) =

English cricketer and umpire

Personal information
- Full name: Allan Arthur Jones
- Born: 9 December 1947 (age 78); Horley, Surrey, England
- Nickname: Jonah, Buckets
- Height: 6 ft 3 in (1.91 m)
- Batting: Right-handed
- Bowling: Right arm fast-medium
- Role: Bowler

Domestic team information
- Years: Team
- 1966–1969: Sussex
- 1970–1975: Somerset
- 1972/73: Northern Transvaal
- 1976–1979: Middlesex
- 1976/77: Orange Free State
- 1980–1981: Glamorgan

Umpiring information
- ODIs umpired: 1 (1996)

Career statistics
Competition	First-class	List A
Matches	214	192
Runs scored	799	155
Batting average	5.39	3.69
100s/50s	0/0	0/0
Top score	33	18*
Balls bowled	29,971	9,009
Wickets	549	286
Bowling average	28.07	20.41
5 wickets in innings	23	5
10 wickets in match	3	0
Best bowling	9/51	6/34
Catches/stumpings	50/–	24/–
- Source: Cricinfo, 4 April 2009

Allan Arthur Jones (born 9 December 1947) is an English cricket umpire and a former cricketer. When he joined Glamorgan in 1980 he became the first cricketer to represent four English first-class counties.

Allan Jones was educated at St John's College, Horsham. A tall right-arm seam bowler and a tail-end right-handed batsman, he represented Sussex (1966–1969), Somerset (1970–1975; capped 1972), Northern Transvaal (1972/73), Orange Free State (1976/77), Middlesex (1976–1979; capped 1976) and Glamorgan (1980–1981).

In 214 first-class matches, he scored 799 runs (average 5.39, with a personal best of 33 for Middlesex versus Kent at Canterbury in 1978) and took 549 wickets (at an average 28.07, with a personal best of 9 for 51 for Somerset versus Sussex at Hove in 1972). He also took three wickets in four balls for Somerset versus Nottinghamshire at Trent Bridge in 1972 and became the first Middlesex bowler to take a hat-trick in limited overs cricket.

He was appointed to the English First-Class Umpires list in 1985 and remained until 2008, when he joined the Indian Cricket League. He stood in one One Day International in 1996.

== See also ==
- List of One Day International cricket umpires
