= Roy Virgin =

English cricketer

Personal information
- Full name: Roy Thomas Virgin
- Born: 26 August 1939 (age 87); Taunton, Somerset, England
- Batting: Right-handed
- Bowling: Legbreak
- Role: Batsman, occasional Wicket-keeper

Domestic team information
- Years: Team
- 1957–1972: Somerset
- 1972/73: Western Province
- 1973–1977: Northamptonshire
- FC debut: 29 May 1957 Somerset v Worcestershire
- Last FC: 7 September 1977 Northamptonshire v Essex
- LA debut: 22 May 1963 Somerset v Glamorgan
- Last LA: 28 August 1977 Northamptonshire v Worcestershire

Career statistics
Competition	First-class	List A
Matches	437	170
Runs scored	21,930	3,755
Batting average	29.87	24.54
100s/50s	37/99	4/22
Top score	179*	123*
Balls bowled	426	8
Wickets	4	1
Bowling average	85.00	5.00
5 wickets in innings	0	0
10 wickets in match	0	0
Best bowling	1/6	1/1
Catches/stumpings	415/0	67/0
- Source: CricketArchive, 13 October 2009

Roy Thomas Virgin (born 26 August 1939) is a former English cricketer who played for Somerset and Northamptonshire County Cricket Clubs.

A right-handed opening batsman, Virgin had a mostly solid but unspectacular career in first-class cricket, except for two individual seasons, one for each of his two counties, during which he looked as good as any opening batsman in county cricket and was mentioned as a possible Test player.

Virgin played first for Somerset in 1957 and was a regular as an opening batsman in 1960, when he scored 1,453 runs at a respectable average of 25 runs per innings. He reappeared in 1963 after National Service and was a regular in the Somerset side for the rest of the 1960s, usually scoring his 1,000 runs a season, but only once averaging more than 30 runs an innings.

But then, suddenly, in 1970, Virgin's batting moved into a different league. Revealing a wider range of shots than before, he scored fast and prolifically, with 2,223 runs at an average of 47 in the season, including seven centuries. He was talked of as a possible England opener and was named as a Wisden Cricketer of the Year in the 1971 edition of the almanack. The 1971 season was another successful year for Virgin, but in 1972 his runmaking fell away badly, and he left Somerset at the end of the season.

The parting was not amicable. Virgin had to wait half a season before he could make his County Championship debut in 1973 for Northamptonshire and then he had limited success. But in 1974, he had a second season of high achievement: 1,936 runs at an average of almost 57 runs per innings meant that he was fifth in the national averages. Again, he was talked of as a potential England player; but again he was not selected.

Virgin was appointed captain of Northamptonshire in 1975, but resigned in August, saying that the captaincy was affecting his batting. He barely made his 1,000 runs that season, but recovered to average 34 in the 1976 season. Batting with Peter Willey he scored 145 in a fourth wicket stand of 370 against Somerset at Northampton, which remains the county record for a fourth wicket partnership. But after a less successful season in 1977 he retired to take up a business appointment.

Early in his career, Virgin occasionally acted as wicketkeeper in first-class matches, and he continued to do so occasionally in one-day matches throughout his career. More often, he was a reliable catcher in the slips and his 42 catches for Somerset in 1966 remains the county record.

Virgin married Margaret Ann Thresher in 1960 and had three children. By 2024, the couple had 4 grandchildren and 3 great-grandchildren.
