= Graham Rose (cricketer) =

English cricketer

Personal information
- Full name: Graham David Rose
- Born: 12 April 1964 (age 62); Tottenham, Middlesex, England
- Batting: Right-handed
- Bowling: Right-arm medium pace

Domestic team information
- Years: Team
- 1983–1986: Middlesex
- 1987–2002: Somerset

Career statistics
Competition	FC	LA
Matches	251	295
Runs scored	8737	5044
Batting average	30.76	23.79
100s/50s	11/41	2/24
Top score	191	148
Balls bowled	34326	12745
Wickets	604	303
Bowling average	29.74	29.65
5 wickets in innings	15	0
10 wickets in match	1	n/a
Best bowling	7/47	4/16
Catches/stumpings	117/–	68/–
- Source: CricketArchive, 22 December 2015

Graham David Rose (born 12 April 1964 in Tottenham, England), is an English former cricketer who played county cricket for Middlesex between 1983 and 1986, and for Somerset between 1987 and 2002. He was a right-handed batsman and right-arm medium pace bowler.

Rose played more than 250 first-class matches for Somerset, scoring over 8,500 runs and just under 600 wickets. He twice took 7 wickets in an innings with his best bowling figures being 7/47 against Nottinghamshire in 1996. He also finished that game with best match figures of 13/88. He finished his first-class career in Somerset with 588 wickets which puts him 16th on their all-time list.

His benefit year in 1997 was arguably his best season for Somerset. He was voted All Rounder of the Year and scored 852 runs with 63 wickets. At Taunton he broke his county's 7th wicket partnership record with a 279 run stand with teammate Richard Harden.

Rose held the world record for fastest ever List A cricket (limited overs) hundred. In 1990 against Devon in Torquay he brought up the milestone off just 36 balls. The record was equalled by Corey Anderson in 2014 and bettered by AB de Villiers in 2015. Rose's 50 had taken just 16 balls which is the equal third fastest of all time.
