= Ted Tyler =

English cricketer

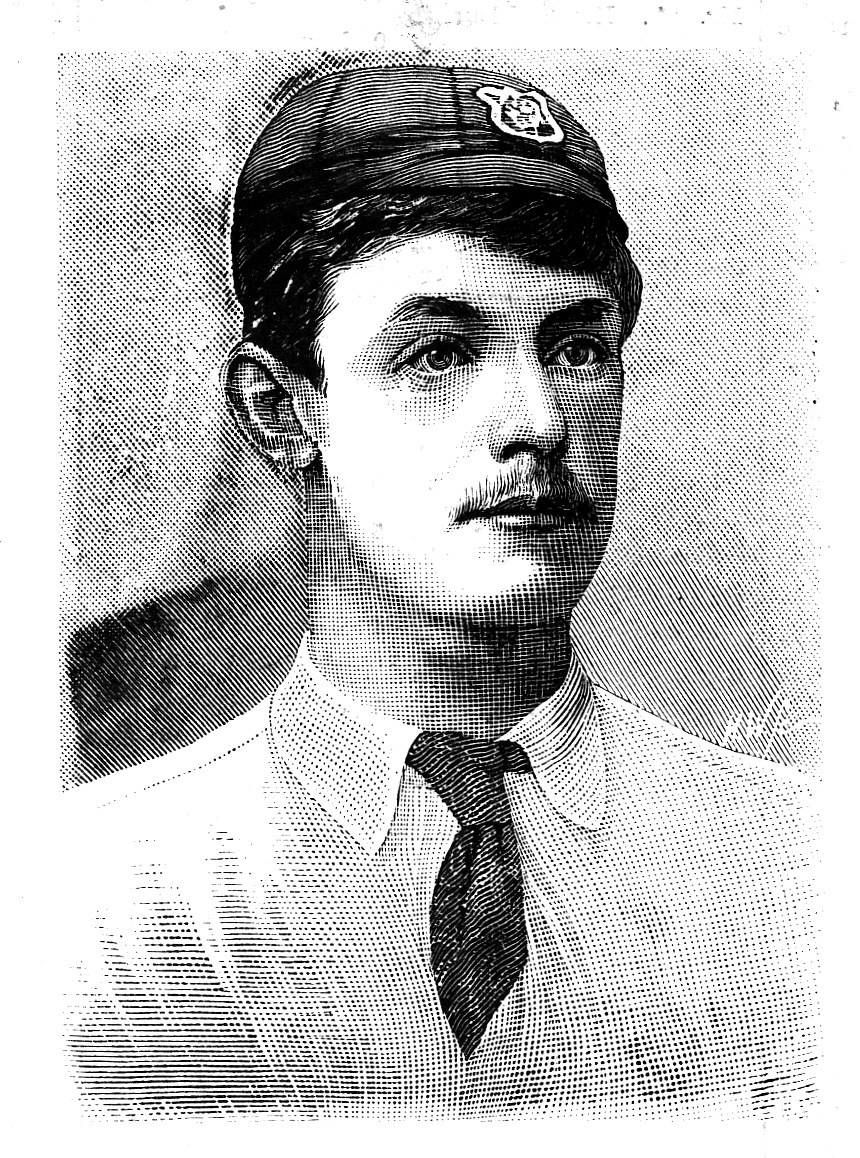

Personal information
- Full name: Edwin James Tyler
- Born: 13 October 1864; Kidderminster, England
- Died: 25 January 1917 (aged 52); Taunton, England
- Batting: Left-handed
- Bowling: Slow left-arm orthodox
- Role: Bowler

International information
- National side: England
- Only Test (cap 103): 21 March 1896 v South Africa

Domestic team information
- Years: Team
- 1891–1907: Somerset

Career statistics
Competition	Test	First-class
Matches	1	185
Runs scored	0	2,952
Batting average	0.00	11.44
100s/50s	0/0	0/6
Top score	0	66
Balls bowled	145	39,291
Wickets	4	895
Bowling average	16.25	22.09
5 wickets in innings	0	77
10 wickets in match	0	22
Best bowling	3/49	10/49
Catches/stumpings	0/–	119/–
- Source: CricketArchive, 15 October 2009

Edwin James Tyler (13 October 1864 – 25 January 1917) was an English cricketer who played first-class cricket for Somerset County Cricket Club between 1891 and 1907. Tyler also played one Test match for England on their tour to South Africa in 1895–96.

Tyler was a left-handed bowler. He played much of his early cricket for the Kidderminster Club, and for two years, 1885 and 1886, he was in the Worcestershire eleven, bowling with success in 1885. Then came his connection with Somerset and his fame as a slow bowler.

Tyler was also a footballer, playing in goal for Taunton F.C. and Somerset Rovers F.C., appearing for the latter in its 1891–92 FA Cup qualifying rounds win over Bristol St George.
