= Alan Whitehead (cricketer) =

English cricketer and umpire

Personal information
- Full name: Alan Geoffrey Thomas Whitehead
- Born: 28 October 1940 (age 86); Butleigh, Somerset, England
- Batting: Left-handed
- Bowling: Left-arm orthodox spin
- Role: Bowler

Domestic team information
- Years: Team
- 1957–1961: Somerset
- First-class debut: 21 August 1957 Somerset v Sussex
- Last First-class: 11 August 1961 Somerset v Glamorgan

Umpiring information
- Tests umpired: 5 (1982–1987)
- ODIs umpired: 14 (1979–2001)
- WTests umpired: 1 (2001)
- FC umpired: 609 (1970–2005)
- LA umpired: 600 (1970–2005)
- T20 umpired: 14 (2003–2005)

Career statistics
Competition	First-class
Matches	38
Runs scored	137
Batting average	5.70
100s/50s	0/0
Top score	15
Balls bowled	5,026
Wickets	67
Bowling average	34.41
5 wickets in innings	3
10 wickets in match	0
Best bowling	6/74
Catches/stumpings	21/–
- Source: CricketArchive, 23 November 2013

Alan Geoffrey Thomas Whitehead (born 28 October 1940 in Butleigh, Somerset) is a former first-class cricketer and umpire.

== Playing career ==
Whitehead played 38 first-class matches for Somerset as a slow left-arm bowler and left-handed tail-end batsman between 1957 and 1961. He took 67 first-class wickets at 34.41 with a best of 6 for 74. His batting was negligible, and his highest first-class score was just 15.

He made his debut as a 16-year-old in two end-of-season friendly first-class matches against Sussex in August 1957; in the second of these matches, he played alongside John McMahon, Somerset's incumbent left-arm spinner, who was then sacked by the county at the end of the season. In 1958, he played in only three matches and failed to take a wicket, Eric Bryant being preferred as the left-arm spin option to bowl alongside off-spinner Brian Langford.

The 1959 season was Whitehead's most successful in first-class cricket. He played in more than half of Somerset's matches, and took 44 first-class wickets. These included three returns of five or more wickets in an innings, the best of which was six wickets for 74 against a Sussex total of 378 for eight declared at Eastbourne, with centuries for Test batsmen Alan Oakman and Ted Dexter. Later in the same month of July 1959, he took five for 33 in the first innings against Northamptonshire at Taunton and followed that with three for 57 off 41 overs in the second innings after Somerset enforced the follow-on.

Whitehead played for Somerset regularly again in the first half of the 1960 season, but he took only 17 wickets at the high average of 43.13. But he lost his place in the side in July when the amateur leg-spin bowler and schoolmaster, Colin Atkinson, became available to be the second spin bowler in the side alongside Langford. Atkinson took more wickets than Whitehead in 1960 and also made useful runs in the lower order. In 1961, Atkinson was available to Somerset for the whole season, and Whitehead played only one first-team match: in this game, he distinguished himself for the only time in his career with the bat, hanging on with fellow "non-batsman" Ken Biddulph for 35 minutes without scoring at the end of the game to earn Somerset a draw. Though he was a regular member of the Somerset second team which won the Minor Counties Championship for the first time in 1961, he left the county staff at the end of the season. He did not play first-class cricket again. He was still only 20 years old.

== Wells Cathedral School ==
Alan Whitehead was a highly appreciated Cricket Coach at Wells Cathedral School 1962–70. In 1967 he was also a founding player in The Willows, a local cricket team for Cathedral School Staff and local people which used School pitches and headquartered in The Fountain Inn in Wells.

Alan has since returned many times over the years to umpire WCS First XI and Willows matches.

== Umpiring career ==
Whitehead became a first-class umpire in 1970 and then stood in more than 600 first-class games before his retirement at the end of the 2005 season. He umpired 5 tests in England, between his first, the India Test at the Oval in 1982 and Pakistan's match at Edgbaston in 1987. He also umpired 14 One Day Internationals between 1979 and 2001.

== See also ==
- List of Test cricket umpires
- List of One Day International cricket umpires
