= List of Somerset first-class cricket records =

This is a list of Somerset first-class cricket records; that is, record team and individual performances in first-class cricket for Somerset County Cricket Club.

== Team ==
=== Most runs in an innings ===
Score	Opposition	Venue	Date
850/7d	Middlesex	County Ground, Taunton	18 April 2007
731	Surrey	County Ground, Taunton	24 September 2026
705/9d	Hampshire	County Ground, Taunton	26 August 2003
688/8d	Surrey	Woodbridge Road, Guildford	19 July 2006
675/9d	Hampshire	Recreation Ground, Bath	12 July 1924
Source: CricketArchive

=== Fewest runs in an innings ===
Score	Opposition	Venue	Date
25	Gloucestershire	County Ground, Bristol	2 August 1947
29	Lancashire	Old Trafford, Manchester	8 June 1882
31	Lancashire	Old Trafford, Manchester	16 July 1894
31	Gloucestershire	County Ground, Bristol	27 May 1931
33	Lancashire	Aigburth, Liverpool	25 June 1908
Source: CricketArchive

== Batting ==
=== Highest individual score ===
Score	Player	Opposition	Venue	Season
371	Tom Banton	Worcestershire	County Ground, Taunton	2025
342	Justin Langer	Surrey	Woodbridge Road, Guildford	2006
322	Viv Richards	Warwickshire	County Ground, Taunton	1985
315	Justin Langer	Middlesex	County Ground, Taunton	2007
313*	Jimmy Cook	Glamorgan	Sophia Gardens, Cardiff	1990

=== Most runs in a season ===
Runs	Player	Season
2,761	Bill Alley	1961
2,755	Jimmy Cook	1991
2,608	Jimmy Cook	1990
2,316	Peter Wight	1960
2,241	Jimmy Cook	1989

=== Most career runs ===
Qualification - 15,000 runs

Runs	Player
21,142	Harold Gimblett
19,654	Marcus Trescothick
17,237	James Hildreth
16,965	Peter Wight
16,644	Bill Alley
16,218	Peter Roebuck
15,458	Roy Virgin
15,243	Frank Lee
15,213	Mervyn Kitchen
15,195	Maurice Tremlett

- **Bold** indicates a current Somerset player.

=== Most hundreds in a season ===
Runs	Player	Season
11	Jimmy Cook	1991
10	Bill Alley	1961
9	Viv Richards	1985
9	Jimmy Cook	1990
8	Jimmy Cook	1989
8	Marcus Trescothick	2009

=== Most career hundreds ===
Qualification - 25 centuries

Hundreds	Player
52	Marcus Trescothick
49	Harold Gimblett
47	Viv Richards
45	James Hildreth
31	Peter Roebuck
28	Richard Harden
28	Jimmy Cook
27	Lionel Palairet
27	Peter Wight
25	Peter Bowler

- **Bold** indicates a current Somerset player.

=== Highest score in each batting position ===
Pos	Score	Player	Opponent	Ground	Season
1	342	Justin Langer	Surrey	Woodbridge Road, Guildford	2006
2	264	Micky Walford	Hampshire	Clarence Park, Weston-super-Mare	1947
3	315	Justin Langer	Middlesex	County Ground, Taunton	2007
4	322	Viv Richards	Warwickshire	County Ground, Taunton	1985
5	371	Tom Banton	Worcestershire	County Ground, Taunton	2025
6	247*	Ian Blackwell	Derbyshire	County Ground, Taunton	2003
7	167*	Shane Lee	Worcestershire	Recreation Ground, Bath	1996
8	191	Graham Rose	Sussex	County Ground, Taunton	1997
9	152	Ian Botham	Leicestershire	Grace Road, Leicester	1983
10	120	Jamie Overton	Warwickshire	Edgbaston Cricket Ground, Birmingham	2020
11	99*	Jimmy Bridges	Essex	Clarence Park, Weston-super-Mare	1919

=== Highest partnership for each wicket ===
Wkt	Runs	Partnership	Opponent	Ground	Season
1st	346	Herbie Hewett & Lionel Palairet	Yorkshire	County Ground, Taunton	1892
2nd	450	Nick Compton & James Hildreth	Cardiff MCCU	Taunton Vale, Taunton	2012
3rd	319	Peter Roebuck & Martin Crowe	Leicestershire	County Ground, Taunton	1984
4th	334	Tom Lammonby & Tom Abell	Surrey	County Ground, Taunton	2026
5th	371	Tom Banton & James Rew	Worcestershire	County Ground, Taunton	2025
6th	265	Bill Alley & Ken Palmer	Northamptonshire	County Ground, Northampton	1961
7th	279	Richard Harden & Graham Rose	Sussex	County Ground, Taunton	1997
8th	236	Peter Trego & Ryan Davies	Lancashire	Old Trafford, Manchester	2016
9th	195	Tom Abell & Migael Pretorius	Surrey	County Ground, Taunton	2026
10th	163	Ian Blackwell & Nixon McLean	Derbyshire	County Ground, Taunton	2003

== Bowling ==
=== Most wickets in an innings ===
Figures	Player	Opposition	Venue	Season
10/49	Ted Tyler	Surrey	County Ground, Taunton	1895
10/76	Jack White	Worcestershire	New Road, Worcester, Worcester	1921
9/26	Brian Langford	Lancashire	Clarence Park, Weston-super-Mare	1958
9/32	Andy Caddick	Lancashire	County Ground, Taunton	1993
9/33	Ted Tyler	Nottinghamshire	County Ground, Taunton	1892

=== Most wickets in a match ===
Figures	Player	Opposition	Venue	Season
16/83	Jack White	Worcestershire	Recreation Ground, Bath	1919
15/54	Brian Langford	Lancashire	Clarence Park, Weston-super-Mare	1958
15/71	Len Braund	Yorkshire	Bramall Lane, Sheffield	1902
15/78	Ellis Robinson	Sussex	Clarence Park, Weston-super-Mare	1951
15/95	Ted Tyler	Sussex	County Ground, Taunton	1895

=== Most wickets in a season ===
Wickets	Player	Season
169	Arthur Wellard	1938
150	Jack White	1929
147	Jack White	1923
146	Jack White	1922
144	Jack White	1924

=== Most career wickets ===
Qualification - 1,000 wickets

Wickets	Player
2,165	Jack White
1,517	Arthur Wellard
1,390	Brian Langford
1,122	Ernie Robson

== Fielding ==
=== Most career catches ===
Qualification - 250 catches

Catches	Player
445	Marcus Trescothick
393	Jack White
361	Len Braund
345	Arthur Wellard
301	Roy Virgin
267	Bill Alley
259	Johnny Lawrence
256	Ernie Robson

- **Bold** indicates a current Somerset player.

=== Most wicket-keeping dismissals in a season ===
Dismissals	Player	Season
86	Harold Stephenson	1954
85	Geoff Clayton	1965
84	Geoff Clayton	1966
83	Harold Stephenson	1949
79	Harold Stephenson	1962
79	Harold Stephenson	1963

=== Most career wicket-keeping dismissals ===
Qualification - 200 dismissals

Dismissals	Player
1006	Harold Stephenson
828	Wally Luckes
670	Robert Turner
659	Derek Taylor
394	Arthur Newton
333	Neil Burns
317	Craig Kieswetter
242	Geoff Clayton
228	Steven Davies
217	Trevor Gard

- **Bold** indicates a current Somerset player.

== Other ==
=== Most career appearances ===
Qualification - 350 matches

Matches	Player	Career
504	Brian Langford	1953–1974
427	Harold Stephenson	1948–1964
424	Ernie Robson	1895–1923
409	Jack White	1909–1937
391	Arthur Wellard	1927–1950
365	Wally Luckes	1924–1949
353	Maurice Tremlett	1947–1960
352	Mervyn Kitchen	1960–1979
350	Bill Alley	1957–1968
350	Horace Hazell	1929–1952

== See also ==
- List of Somerset List A cricket records
- List of Somerset Twenty20 cricket records
