= John Harris (English cricketer) =

English cricketer and umpire (1936–2019)

Personal information
- Full name: John Henry Harris
- Born: 13 February 1936; Taunton, Somerset, England
- Died: 28 March 2019 (aged 83); Devon, England
- Batting: Left-handed
- Bowling: Right-arm fast medium
- Role: Bowler

Domestic team information
- Years: Team
- 1952–1959: Somerset
- First-class debut: 24 May 1952 Somerset v Glamorgan
- Last First-class: 17 July 1959 Somerset v Derbyshire

Career statistics
Competition	First-class
Matches	15
Runs scored	154
Batting average	11.00
100s/50s	–/–
Top score	41
Balls bowled	1304
Wickets	19
Bowling average	32.05
5 wickets in innings	–
10 wickets in match	–
Best bowling	3/29
Catches/stumpings	6/–
- Source: CricketArchive, 15 November 2010

John Henry Harris (13 February 1936 – 28 March 2019) played first-class cricket for Somerset between 1952 and 1959 and was a first-class umpire in English cricket from 1981 to 2000. He was born at Taunton, Somerset.

== Cricket player ==
As a player, Harris was a lower-order left-handed batsman and a right-arm fast-medium bowler. He made his debut for Somerset in May 1952 aged just 16 years and three months, the youngest cricketer ever to play for the county; he did not take a wicket in his first match but scored 18 out of a ninth wicket partnership of 48 with Bertie Buse. There were two further matches in 1953 before Harris disappeared from first-class cricket for three years on national service. When his cricket career resumed with five matches in 1957, he made useful runs from the lower order, with a career-highest of 41 in the match against Worcestershire. But he still struggled for wickets in a Somerset side that, unlike the year of the debut, 1952, now had several options in fast and medium-paced bowling with the recruitment of Bill Alley, Ken Palmer, Bryan Lobb, Ken Biddulph and Geoff Lomax. He did not play at all in Somerset's successful season of 1958 but returned for seven games in 1959. These included his best bowling performance, three wickets for 29 runs against Worcestershire. But at the end of the season although his contract had a further year to go Harris retired due to an injury and a job offer as a coach with Framlingham College, Suffolk.

Harris played Minor Counties cricket for Suffolk for four seasons from 1960 to 1963 and then disappeared entirely from representative cricket for a dozen years, reappearing in 1975, again in Minor Counties cricket, this time playing for Devon.

== Cricket umpire & later years ==
Harris was an umpire in Minor Counties matches involving Devon from 1979 to 1982 and from 1981 he started acting as umpire in a few first-class matches too. In 1983 he was appointed for the regular first-class and List A umpires for English cricket and he remained there, officiating in 288 first-class and 308 List A games, until he retired at the end of the 2000 season. He acted as reserve umpire in one Test match in his final season as an umpire.

In his later years, Harris was secretary/chairman of the former Somerset Players Association.

Harris died near his home in Devon on 28 March 2019 aged 83.
