= Roy Smith (cricketer, born 1930) =

English cricketer (1930–2020)

Personal information
- Full name: Roy Smith
- Born: 14 April 1930; Taunton, Somerset, England
- Died: 22 September 2020 (aged 90); Weston-super-Mare, Somerset, England
- Batting: Right-handed
- Bowling: Left-arm orthodox spin
- Role: Batsman

Domestic team information
- Years: Team
- 1949–1955: Somerset
- First-class debut: 27 June 1949 Somerset v Cambridge University
- Last First-class: 15 July 1955 Somerset v Worcestershire

Career statistics
Competition	First-class
Matches	96
Runs scored	2600
Batting average	17.10
100s/50s	1/9
Top score	100
Balls bowled	2067
Wickets	19
Bowling average	57.00
5 wickets in innings	–
10 wickets in match	–
Best bowling	4/91
Catches/stumpings	31/–
- Source: CricketArchive, 3 May 2010

Roy Smith (14 April 1930 – 22 September 2020) played first-class cricket for Somerset County Cricket Club between 1949 and 1955. He was a right-handed middle order batsman and a left-arm orthodox spin bowler.

== Cricket career ==
Born at Taunton, Somerset on 14 April 1930, Smith made his first-class debut in 1949, scoring 40 in the second innings of the match against Cambridge University at Bath. He then played eight games in 1950 without exceeding that score, and 17 in 1951 without achieving a first-class 50; in the 27 first-class matches he played in the first three seasons of his career, he bowled only 31 overs and took no wickets.

In the 1952 season, Smith again played in about half of Somerset's first-class matches. In the game against Essex at Taunton, batting at No 8, he made 58, his first score of more than 50. And towards the end of the season, when regular left-arm spinner Horace Hazell was dropped, he took four Leicestershire wickets for 91 runs in the match at Leicester, and those proved to be the best innings bowling figures of his career. Somerset finished at the bottom of the County Championship in 1952 and at the end of the season several players, including Hazell, were not re-engaged.

Smith was a regular player in the Somerset side in 1953 and took two wickets in the first match of the season, against Worcestershire. But that proved to be his best bowling figures of the season: in all, he bowled 186.3 overs and took just five wickets at a cost of 131.40 each, and Wisden noted that Somerset, for the first time in 50 years, "lacked a recognised slow left-arm bowler". But if the bowling was not a success, then Smith made great progress as a batsman, making 1176 runs at an average of 26.17 and moving up the batting order to finish the season as the county's regular No 3. The runs included an innings of exactly 100 in the match against Worcestershire at Frome, after which he was awarded his county cap.

After that, Smith's cricket career declined. In 1954, Somerset had recruited other slow bowlers, John McMahon and Jim Hilton, so his bowling was not called on at all. But his batting failed and he made less than half his 1953 total of runs: 474, at an average of 13.94, with only one score of more than 50. There was no respite in 1955, when new recruits to Somerset's batting line-up meant there was room for him in only five matches, and in 1956, when Somerset finally came off the bottom of the Championship table after four years there, he played only for the second team, leaving the staff at the end of the season.

== After first-class cricket ==
After leaving Somerset, Smith played Minor Counties cricket for Devon from 1957 to 1961. He became a teacher, teaching at Huish's Grammar School, Taunton, where he had been a student.
