= List of Somerset List A cricket records =

This is a list of Somerset List A cricket records; that is, record team and individual performances in List A cricket for Somerset County Cricket Club.

== Team ==
- Highest total for: 413/4 v Devon at Recreation Ground, Torquay, 1990
- Highest total against: 454/3 by Gloucestershire at Bristol, 2023
- Lowest total for: 58 v Essex at Chelmsford, 1977 & 58 v Middlesex at John Walker's Ground, Southgate, 2000
- Lowest total against: 60 by Kent at Taunton, 1979

== Batting ==
- Most runs in a season: 1331 Jimmy Cook, 1990

=== Highest individual score ===
Qualification: individual score of 150 runs or more.

Runs	Player	Opposition	Venue	Season
184	Marcus Trescothick	v Gloucestershire	County Ground, Taunton	2008
177	Jimmy Cook	v Sussex	County Ground, Hove	1990
175*	Ian Botham	v Northamptonshire	Wellingborough School, Wellingborough	1986
172*	Andrew Umeed	v Derbyshire	County Ground, Derby	2023
165*	Roelof van der Merwe	v Surrey	County Ground, Taunton	2017
162*	Chris Tavaré	v Devon	Recreation Ground, Torquay	1990
159	James Hildreth	v Glamorgan	County Ground, Taunton	2018
158	Marcus Trescothick	v Kent	St Lawrence Ground, Canterbury	2006
157	Carl Gazzard	v Derbyshire	County Ground, Derby	2004
157	Ben Green	v Durham	County Ground, Taunton	2022
155*	Martin Crowe	v Hampshire	County Ground, Southampton	1987
151	James Hildreth	v Scotland	County Ground, Taunton	2009
Source: Cricket Archive.

=== Most List A runs for Somerset ===
Qualification - 5000 runs

Player	Runs
Marcus Trescothick	7374
Viv Richards	7349
Peter Roebuck	6871
Peter Denning	6792
Richard Harden	6275
James Hildreth	6096
Brian Rose	5708
Keith Parsons	5225
Ian Botham	5049

=== Most career hundreds ===
Qualification - 5 centuries

Hundreds	Player
15	Marcus Trescothick
11	Viv Richards
10	Peter Trego
8	Jimmy Cook
8	James Hildreth
8	Craig Kieswetter
6	Jamie Cox
5	Peter Denning
5	Mark Lathwell
5	Peter Roebuck
5	Chris Tavaré

=== Highest partnership for each wicket ===
Wkt	Runs	Partnership	Opponent	Ground	Season
1st	241	Sunil Gavaskar & Brian Rose	Kent	St Lawrence Ground, Canterbury	1980
2nd	302	Marcus Trescothick & Craig Kieswetter	Gloucestershire	County Ground, Taunton	2008
3rd	269*	Peter Roebuck & Martin Crowe	Hampshire	County Ground, Southampton	1987
4th	189	Chris Tavare & Graham Rose	Devon	Recreation Ground, Torquay	1990
5th	179	Viv Richards & Ian Botham	Hampshire	County Ground, Taunton	1981
6th	213	Dean Elgar & Roelof van der Merwe	Surrey	County Ground, Taunton	2017
7th	151*	Ian Blackwell & Robert Turner	Sussex	County Ground, Taunton	2005
8th	95*	Dennis Breakwell & Keith Jennings	Nottinghamshire	Trent Bridge, Nottingham	1976
9th	103*	Tim Groenewald & Alfonso Thomas	Kent	County Ground, Taunton	2014
10th	65*	Jamie Overton & Tim Groenewald	Gloucestershire	County Ground, Taunton	2016

== Bowling ==
- Best Bowling: 8/66 Simon Francis v Derbyshire at County Ground, Derby, 2004
- Wickets in Season: 51, Bob Clapp, 1974

=== Most List A wickets for Somerset ===
Qualification - 300 wickets

Player	Wickets
Hallam Moseley	309
Ian Botham	300

== See also ==
- List of Somerset first-class cricket records
- List of Somerset Twenty20 cricket records
