= Geoff Lomax =

English cricketer (1925–1992)

Personal information
- Full name: James Geoffrey Lomax
- Born: 20 May 1925; Rochdale, Lancashire, England
- Died: 21 May 1992 (aged 67); Frenchay Hospital, Bristol, England
- Batting: Right-handed
- Bowling: Right-arm fast-medium
- Role: All-rounder

Domestic team information
- Years: Team
- 1949–1953: Lancashire
- 1954–1962: Somerset
- FC debut: 18 May 1949 Lancashire v Oxford University
- Last FC: 10 August 1962 Somerset v Middlesex

Career statistics
Competition	First-class
Matches	269
Runs scored	8,672
Batting average	19.70
100s/50s	2/44
Top score	104*
Balls bowled	24,467
Wickets	316
Bowling average	34.09
5 wickets in innings	4
10 wickets in match	0
Best bowling	6/75
Catches/stumpings	238/–
- Source: CricketArchive, 11 December 2009

James Geoffrey Lomax (20 May 1925 – 21 May 1992) was an English cricketer who played first-class cricket as a right-handed batsman and right-arm fast-medium bowler for Lancashire and Somerset between 1949 and 1962. He was born at Rochdale, then in Lancashire, and died at Frenchay Hospital, near Bristol.

== Cricketing style ==
Tall and fair-haired, Lomax was initially seen as a fast-medium bowler who could bat a bit, but in his later cricket career with Somerset was used mainly as a batsman, often opening the innings. He was, says one account, "an artisan all-round cricketer". It goes on: "He found himself, at some time, batting in almost every position in the order; he pegged away at just above medium pace, capable of his two or three wickets. In the slips he hardly ever dropped a catch."

Lomax's career figures appear modest but his obituary in Wisden Cricketers' Almanack in 1993 was generous in tribute: "Figures cannot illustrate all the in-filling he did and his unselfish response to whatever the situation demanded, or the fact that he was a real gentleman."

== Lancashire player ==
Lomax was a regular member of the 1948 Lancashire Second Eleven which won the Minor Counties Championship, but though he took 19 wickets at an average of 16.94 his main task appears to have been to start the bowling before giving way to the spin trio of Roy Tattersall (66 wickets), Bob Berry (47) and Malcolm Hilton (42), all of whose wickets cost fewer than 12 runs apiece. In 1949, Lomax moved on into occasional first-team matches, opening the bowling in his first first-class game against Oxford University, when he bowled 23 overs in the match for 31 runs (and two wickets). There were six first-class matches in 1949, nine in 1950 and eight in 1951; in none of them did he manage to take more than three wickets in an innings and nor did he make significant runs. In 1951, in the match against Middlesex at Old Trafford, he made his first score of more than 50, with 52, and put on 103 for the seventh wicket with the schoolboy Colin Smith.

The 1952 season was Lomax's only season of regular first-team cricket for Lancashire: he played in 27 of the county's first-class matches, plus one other end-of-season game for North v South at Kingston-upon-Thames. As in the Minor Counties side four years earlier, he was employed largely to open the bowling, usually alongside Brian Statham, before the spinners Tattersall, Hilton and Berry took over. In all matches across the season he took 51 wickets at the respectable average of 26.11. His best bowling was his first five-wicket haul, with five for 18 in Surrey's second innings as the eventual County champions, albeit without four Test stars, were bowled out for 86 to lose by an innings and 70 runs at The Oval. Wisden noted that Lomax's "pace and lift" was met with "only feeble resistance". Lomax's batting was often useful too, usually at No 7 or No 8 in the batting order, although when either Jack Ikin or Cyril Washbrook was called up for Tests, he opened the innings, with indifferent results. In the season as a whole he made 694 runs at an average of 17.79, and he passed 50 twice, the higher innings being 78 against Kent at Mote Park, Maidstone, when he shared a sixth-wicket partnership of 193 in two hours with his captain, Nigel Howard, who made an unbeaten 138. Lomax was awarded his county cap by Lancashire for his work in 1952.

After that, the 1953 season was an anticlimax, with just 36 runs and 11 wickets from only seven matches, as Lancashire abandoned any attempt at a balanced attack and used the left-handed batsman Alan Wharton for most of the season as Statham's opening partner in the bowling. At the end of the season, Lomax left Lancashire and signed for Somerset, which had just finished for the second consecutive season at the bottom of the County Championship and was recruiting from far and wide.

== Somerset player ==
Lomax was one of three new Somerset players in 1954 with previous experience of county cricket – the others were his Lancashire off-spin colleague Jim Hilton and the Australian-born Surrey slow left-arm bowler John McMahon. As at Lancashire, the balance of the Somerset bowling attack was very much towards spin bowling; Lomax was used as an opening bowler, but even so he bowled fewer than half the overs that McMahon delivered, and his 46 wickets for the season came at the rather high bowling average of 32.52. These figures, however, included a return of six for 75 in Surrey's first innings in the match at The Oval, and these were to remain the best bowling figures of his career. Lomax's batting improved and he batted mostly at No 6 or No 7 in the order. Early in the season against Yorkshire he equalled his previous highest score of 78. Then in mid-August he scored 101, his maiden first-class century, in the match against Northamptonshire at Taunton, despite sustaining an elbow injury against an attack that included Frank Tyson, then at the height of his fast-bowling powers. In all matches, Lomax made 983 runs at an average of 19.27 runs per innings. He was awarded his Somerset county cap.

The 1955 season saw Somerset recruit a new fast-medium bowler, Bryan Lobb. Lomax's bowling was used less, and he took only 19 wickets at the high cost of 56.47 runs per wicket. As a batsman he was again useful in the late middle order, totalling 892 runs for an average of 21.23; his highest score for the season was just 71. Somerset remained at the bottom of the County Championship table in both of Lomax's first two seasons with the team. Somerset improved to 15th (out of 17) in 1956, but Lomax's performances remained very similar: an aggregate of 960 runs at 19.59 and just 17 wickets at 67.46. His highest score was 99 in the match against Cambridge University, when he put on 177 in 116 minutes for the sixth-wicket with Harold Stephenson, setting a new Somerset record for a sixth wicket partnership in a first-class match. After this match, Lomax was promoted to open the innings for much of the rest of the season, though he moved down the order again in August when the amateur Dennis Silk was available to open.

For the first time since Lomax joined the county, Somerset had in 1957 a relatively strong team, and a loss of form meant that Lomax was uncertain of his place in the team for much of the season. He played in only half the first-class matches, made just 351 runs at an average of 12.10 and bowled only 110 overs, taking 13 wickets. But he was back in the side as a regular in 1958, which was Somerset's most successful season in the County Championship since 1892, and he not only became part of a settled opening partnership with Bill Alley, but also completed 1000 runs in a season for the first time. His final aggregate was 1096 runs at average of 21.92; there were no centuries in this season. In addition, with the emphasis of the Somerset bowling now firmly on seam rather than spin, he bowled four times the number of overs he had in 1957, and took 50 wickets at the, for him, low average of 22.48. His best bowling of the season was again against Surrey, with five for 26 in the match at Taunton – the third five-wicket haul of his career, and all of them against Surrey. He had a particularly successful match against Nottinghamshire at Weston-super-Mare, scoring 80 in Somerset's first innings out of a total of 170, finishing the Nottinghamshire second innings with a hat-trick, and then hitting a quick 53 to set Somerset on the road to victory. In its notes on Somerset for the season, Wisden wrote: "Given more scope for his medium pace bowling, Lomax might conceivably perform the double one season."

That didn't happen, but the 1959 season was again successful for Lomax, with 1298 runs at an average of 24.96, the highest in terms of both aggregate and average in his career. He opened the Somerset batting all season and had a new regular opening partner in Graham Atkinson. He maintained the improvement in his bowling, with 43 wickets at an average of 25.90. The five wickets he took for 36 runs in Northamptonshire's second innings of the match at Northampton was the only time in his career that he took five or more wickets in an innings against a side other than Surrey. The 1960 match against the same opponents at the same venue had a less happy outcome: in the third first-class fixture of the season, Lomax made 51 of a first wicket partnership of 108 with Atkinson before breaking a bone in his wrist which then kept him out of cricket for the rest of the 1960 season.

Lomax returned to the Somerset side as a regular player in 1961, but his role as opening batsman had been taken in his absence by Brian Roe, so Lomax batted in the middle order. He made 938 runs at an average of 19.14 and took 36 wickets at 33.97; there were no centuries and no five-wicket innings. The batting record in 1962 was similar, with 865 runs at an average of 24.02. There was, though, finally a second century to add to the one he had scored in 1954 – an unbeaten 104 in the match against Sussex at Eastbourne, which was the highest innings of Lomax's career. By contrast, Lomax's bowling in 1962 was negligible: just nine wickets all season at a high cost. Towards the end of the 1962 season, Lomax was left out of the side for some matches and he retired from first-class cricket at the end of the season.
