= List of Somerset Twenty20 cricket records =

This is a list of Somerset Twenty20 cricket records; that is, record team and individual performances in Twenty20 cricket for Somerset County Cricket Club.

== Team ==
=== Highest innings totals ===
Score	Opposition	Venue	Date
265/5	Derbyshire	County Ground, Taunton	9 July 2022
250/3	Gloucestershire	County Ground, Taunton	27 June 2006
241/5	Hampshire	County Ground, Taunton	9 June 2024
235/5	Middlesex	County Ground, Taunton	12 June 2025
235/5	Middlesex	County Ground, Taunton	5 June 2011
Source: ESPNcricinfo

=== Lowest innings totals ===
Score	Opposition	Venue	Date
82	Kent	County Ground, Taunton	18 July 2010
90	Sussex	County Ground, Hove	14 June 2011
98	Hampshire	Rose Bowl, Southampton	29 July 2016
100	Hampshire	Rose Bowl, Southampton	9 July 2021
103	Sussex	County Ground, Hove	1 June 2010
Source: ESPNcricinfo

=== Largest victory margin (by runs) ===
Margin	Target	Opposition	Venue	Date
191 runs	266	Derbyshire	County Ground, Taunton	9 July 2022
143 runs	226	Essex	County Ground, Chelmsford	15 June 2011
117 runs	251	Gloucestershire	County Ground, Taunton	27 June 2006
114 runs	226	Essex	County Ground, Chelmsford	7 August 2019
108 runs	194	Glamorgan	County Ground, Taunton	16 June 2024
Source: ESPNcricinfo

=== Largest victory margin (by wickets) ===
As of 28 June 2021, Somerset have won by 10 wickets on four occasions. The highest target they have reached without losing a wicket is 169 against Kent in June 2021.

== Batting ==
=== Highest individual score ===
Score	Player	Opposition	Venue	Season
151*	Chris Gayle	Kent	County Ground, Taunton	2015
141*	Cameron White	Worcestershire	New Road, Worcester	2006
116*	Cameron White	Gloucestershire	County Ground, Taunton	2006
116*	James Rew	Gloucestershire	County Ground, Taunton	2026
114*	Babar Azam	Glamorgan	Sophia Gardens, Cardiff	2020
Source: ESPNcricinfo

=== Most runs in a season ===
Runs	Player	Season
623	Rilee Rossouw	2022
620	Will Smeed	2025
578	Babar Azam	2019
572	Marcus Trescothick	2010
557	Tom Kohler-Cadmore	2025
Source: ESPNcricinfo

=== Most career runs ===
Qualification - 1,000 runs

Runs	Player
3,906	James Hildreth
3,274	Peter Trego
2,683	Will Smeed
2,658	Tom Abell
2,614	Tom Banton
2,202	Craig Kieswetter
2,197	Marcus Trescothick
2,192	Lewis Gregory
1,568	Tom Kohler-Cadmore
1,213	Roelof van der Merwe
1,087	Johann Myburgh
1,014	Justin Langer
1,012	Jos Buttler
1,007	Sean Dickson
Source: ESPNcricinfo

=== Highest partnership for each wicket ===
Wkt	Runs	Partnership	Opponent	Ground	Season
1st	169*	Tom Banton & Devon Conway	Kent	St Lawrence Ground, Canterbury	2021
2nd	186	Justin Langer & Cameron White	Gloucestershire	County Ground, Taunton	2006
3rd	165	Will Smeed & Tom Abell	Surrey	County Ground, Taunton	2022
4th	144	Tom Abell & Sean Dickson	Hampshire	County Ground, Taunton	2024
4th	144	James Rew & Sean Dickson	Surrey	Edgbaston Cricket Ground	2024
5th	117*	Jordan Hermann & Lewis Gregory	Warwickshire	County Ground, Taunton	2026
6th	96*	Lewis Gregory & Ben Green	Nottinghamshire	County Ground, Taunton	2023
7th	82	Lewis Gregory & Lewis Goldsworthy	Hampshire	County Ground, Taunton	2025
8th	59*	Roelof van der Merwe & Josh Davey	Gloucestershire	Bristol County Ground, Bristol	2022
9th	80*	Craig Overton & Riley Meredith	Yorkshire	Headingley Cricket Ground	2026
10th	38*	Abdur Rehman & Alfonso Thomas	Kent	St Lawrence Ground	2015

== Bowling ==
- Best bowling: 6/5 Arul Suppiah v Glamorgan at SWALEC Stadium, 2011
- Wickets in season: 33 Alfonso Thomas, 2010

=== Most Twenty20 wickets for Somerset ===
Qualification - 25 wickets

Player	Wickets
Lewis Gregory	169
Max Waller	139
Alfonso Thomas	137
Craig Overton	117
Ben Green	103
Roelof van der Merwe	100
Josh Davey	74
Riley Meredith	56
Peter Trego	50
Matt Henry	47
Jamie Overton	45
Lewis Goldsworthy	44
Kieron Pollard	41
Arul Suppiah	41
Jake Ball	40
Charl Willoughby	39
Jerome Taylor	36
Murali Kartik	34
Steve Kirby	34
Mark Turner	30
Ben Phillips	29
Gareth Andrew	28
Tim Groenewald	28
Marchant de Lange	26

== See also ==
- List of Somerset first-class cricket records
- List of Somerset List A cricket records
