= Jason Kerr =

Jason Kerr may refer to:

- Jason Kerr (cricketer) (born 1974), English cricketer and coach
- Jason Kerr (footballer) (born 1997), Scottish footballer
