= Eric Bryant =

Eric Bryant may refer to:

- Eric Bryant (cricketer) (1936–1999), English cricketer
- Eric Bryant (footballer) (1921–1995), footballer for various English clubs
