= John McMahon (Surrey and Somerset cricketer) =

Australian cricketer (1917–2001)

Personal information
- Full name: John William Joseph McMahon
- Born: 28 December 1917; Balaklava, South Australia
- Died: 8 May 2001 (aged 83); Islington, London, England
- Batting: Left-handed
- Bowling: Slow left-arm orthodox
- Role: Bowler

Domestic team information
- Years: Team
- 1947–1953: Surrey
- 1954–1957: Somerset
- FC debut: 7 June 1947 Surrey v Lancashire
- Last FC: 30 August 1957 Somerset v Sussex

Career statistics
Competition	First-class
Matches	201
Runs scored	989
Batting average	6.18
100s/50s	0/0
Top score	24
Balls bowled	37,038
Wickets	590
Bowling average	27.60
5 wickets in innings	30
10 wickets in match	2
Best bowling	8/46
Catches/stumpings	109/–
- Source: CricketArchive, 6 November 2009

John William Joseph McMahon (28 December 1917 – 8 May 2001) was an Australian-born first-class cricketer who played for Surrey and Somerset County Cricket Clubs in England from 1947 to 1957.

== Surrey cricketer ==
McMahon was an orthodox left-arm spin bowler with much variation in speed and flight who was spotted by Surrey playing in club cricket in North London and brought on to the county's staff for the 1947 season at the age of 29. In the first innings of his first match, against Lancashire at The Oval, he took five wickets for 81 runs.

In his first full season, 1948, he was Surrey's leading wicket-taker and in the last home game of the season he was awarded his county cap – he celebrated by taking eight Northamptonshire wickets for 46 runs at The Oval, six of them coming in the space of 6.3 overs for seven runs. This would remain the best bowling performance of his first-class career, not surpassed, but he did equal it seven years later. In the following game, the last away match of the season, he took 10 Hampshire wickets for 150 runs in the match at Bournemouth. In the 1948 season as a whole, he took 91 wickets at an average of 28.07. As a tail-end left-handed batsman, he managed just 93 runs in the season at an average of 4.22.

The emergence of Tony Lock as a slow left-arm bowler in 1949 brought a stuttering end of McMahon's Surrey career. Though he played in 12 first-class matches in the 1949 season, McMahon took only 19 wickets; a similar number of matches in 1950 brought 34 wickets. In 1951, he played just seven times and in 1952 only three times. In 1953, Lock split the first finger of his left hand, and played in only 11 of Surrey's County Championship matches; McMahon played as his deputy in 14 Championship matches, though a measure of their comparative merits was that Lock's 11 games produced 67 wickets at 12.38 runs apiece, while McMahon's 14 games brought him 45 wickets at the, for him, low average of 21.53. At the end of the 1953 season, McMahon was allowed to leave Surrey to join Somerset, then languishing at the foot of the County Championship and recruiting widely from other counties and other countries.

== Somerset cricketer ==
Somerset's slow bowling in 1954 was in the hands of leg-spinner Johnny Lawrence, with support from the off-spin of Jim Hilton while promising off-spinner Brian Langford was on national service. McMahon filled a vacancy for a left-arm orthodox spinner that had been there since the retirement of Horace Hazell at the end of the 1952 season; Hazell's apparent successor, Roy Smith, had failed to realise his promise as a bowler in 1953, though his batting had advanced significantly.

McMahon instantly became a first-team regular and played in almost every match during his four years with the county, not missing a single Championship game until he was controversially dropped from the side in August 1957, after which he did not play in the Championship again.

In the 1954 season, McMahon, alongside fellow newcomer Hilton, was something of a disappointment, according to Wisden: "The new spin bowlers, McMahon and Hilton, did not attain to the best standards of their craft in a wet summer, yet, like the rest of the attack, they would have fared better with reasonable support in the field and from their own batsmen," it said. McMahon took 85 wickets at an average of 27.47 (Hilton took only 42 at a higher average). His best match was against Essex at Weston-super-Mare where he took six for 96 in the first innings and five for 45 in the second to finish with match figures of 11 for 141, which were the best of his career. He was awarded his county cap in the 1954 season, but Somerset remained at the bottom of the table.

The figures for the 1955 were similar: McMahon this time took 75 wickets at 28.77 apiece. There was a small improvement in his batting and the arrival of Bryan Lobb elevated McMahon to No 10 in the batting order for most of the season, and he responded with 262 runs and an average of 9.03. This included his highest-ever score, 24, made in the match against Sussex at Frome. A week later in Somerset's next match, he equalled his best-ever bowling performance, taking eight Kent wickets for 46 runs in the first innings of a match at Yeovil through what Wisden called "clever variation of flight and spin". These matches brought two victories for Somerset, but there were only two others in the 1955 season and the side finished at the bottom of the Championship for the fourth season running.

At the end of the 1955 season, Lawrence retired and McMahon became Somerset's senior spin bowler for the 1956 season, with Langford returning from National Service as the main support. McMahon responded with his most successful season so far, taking 103 wickets at an average of 25.57, the only season in his career in which he exceeded 100 wickets. The bowling average improved still further in 1957 to 23.10 when McMahon took 86 wickets. But his season came to an abrupt end in mid-August 1957 when, after 108 consecutive Championship matches, he was dropped from the first team during the Weston-super-Mare festival. Though he played some games for the second eleven later in August, he regained his place in the first team for only a single end-of-season friendly match, and he was told that his services were not required for the future, a decision, said Wisden, that "proved highly controversial".

== Sacked by Somerset ==
The reason behind McMahon's sacking did not become public knowledge for many years. In its obituary of him in 2002, McMahon was described by Wisden as "a man who embraced the antipodean virtues of candour and conviviality". It went on: "Legend tells of a night at the Flying Horse Inn in Nottingham when he beheaded the gladioli with an ornamental sword, crying: 'When Mac drinks, everybody drinks!'" The obituary recounts a further escapade in second eleven match at Midsomer Norton where a curfew imposed on the team was circumvented by "a POW-type loop" organised by McMahon, "with his team-mates escaping through a ground-storey window and then presenting themselves again". As the only Somerset second eleven match that McMahon played in at Midsomer Norton was right at the end of the 1957 season, this may have been the final straw. But in any case there had been "an embarrassing episode at Swansea's Grand Hotel" earlier in the season, also involving Jim Hilton, who was also dismissed at the end of the season. Team-mates and club members petitioned for McMahon to be reinstated, but the county club was not to be moved.

After a period in Lancashire League cricket with Milnrow Cricket Club, McMahon moved back to London where he did office work, later contributing some articles to cricket magazines.
