= Jim Hilton =

English cricketer

Cricket information
- Batting: Right-handed
- Bowling: Right-arm off-break

Career statistics
Competition	First-class
Matches	79
Runs scored	1,093
Batting average	10.93
100s/50s	0/2
Top score	61*
Balls bowled	8,529
Wickets	135
Bowling average	27.22
5 wickets in innings	7
10 wickets in match	0
Best bowling	7/98
Catches/stumpings	53/–
- Source: CricketArchive, 31 October 2022

Jim Hilton (29 December 1930 – 26 November 2008) was a cricketer who played for Lancashire and Somerset. He was born in Werneth, Oldham, Lancashire, and died at Oldham. His name was Jim, not James.

The younger brother of England and Lancashire bowler Malcolm Hilton, Jim Hilton was a lower-order right-handed batsman and a right-arm off-break bowler. Unable to break into regular Lancashire first team cricket because of the competition for slow bowling places from his brother and Roy Tattersall, Hilton moved south and played two full seasons for Somerset in 1954 and 1955. Even in a side as poor as Somerset's – the county finished bottom of the County Championship for four consecutive seasons from 1952 to 1955 – Hilton's bowling opportunities were limited by the presence of Johnny Lawrence and John McMahon, and he did not take more than 42 wickets in a season.

In 1956, fellow off-spinner Brian Langford returned from National Service and became first-choice, and though Hilton played fairly regularly again in 1957, he left the county's staff at the end of the season.

He reappeared for Lancashire in Second Eleven matches for several further years, but did not play first-class cricket again.
