= Roy Kerslake =

English cricketer

Personal information
- Full name: Roy Cosmo Kerslake
- Born: 26 December 1942 (age 83); Paignton, Devon, England
- Batting: Right-handed
- Bowling: Right-arm off-spin
- Role: All-rounder

Domestic team information
- Years: Team
- 1962–1964: Cambridge University
- 1962–1968: Somerset
- FC debut: 28 April 1962 Cambridge Univ. v Surrey
- Last FC: 6 August 1976 Minor Counties v West Indians

Career statistics
Competition	First-class
Matches	85
Runs scored	1,939
Batting average	16.43
100s/50s	0/6
Top score	80
Balls bowled	6,223
Wickets	114
Bowling average	22.95
5 wickets in innings	4
10 wickets in match	0
Best bowling	6/77
Catches/stumpings	65/–
- Source: CricketArchive, 29 June 2008

Roy Cosmo Kerslake (born 26 December 1942) is a former English cricketer who played first-class cricket for Cambridge University and Somerset, and captained Somerset for one season in 1968. More recently he has been prominent as a cricket administrator, serving as president of Somerset County Cricket Club from 2004 to 2015. He was born at Paignton in Devon.

== Early career ==
Kerslake was a middle to lower order right-handed batsman and a right-arm off-break bowler. Educated at Kingswood School, Bath, where he topped the batting and bowling averages in 1961, he played for Somerset's second eleven in the Minor Counties that season, being part of the team that won the Minor Counties Championship for the first time. He batted in the middle order and took 16 wickets for less than seven runs each.

In 1962, he was at Cambridge, but made little impression in three first-class matches for the university. In August of the same year, he played for Somerset's first team in six matches as a middle-order batsman, but did not bowl.

== Regular player ==
The following season, he played regularly for Cambridge and won his blue. He headed the Cambridge bowling averages with 26 wickets at a cost of only 13.30 each and made 259 runs in the lower order, without reaching 50. In the second half of the season, he played again for Somerset, making only a few runs and failing to take a single wicket as the county relied for off-spin on the established Brian Langford.

The 1964 season was Kerslake's best in first-class cricket. The honorary secretary at Cambridge (and captain in one match in the absence of regular captain Mike Brearley), he finished second in both batting and bowling averages, with 576 runs at 32 runs per innings and 36 wickets. Against the Australians he featured in an eighth wicket stand of 109 in 85 minutes. Against Surrey at The Oval he made 80, which remained the highest score of his career. His career-best bowling performance was also for Cambridge University in this season: six for 77 against Worcestershire in the first first-class match ever played at Halesowen.

In the second half of the 1964 season, Kerslake again appeared regularly for Somerset. His batting was not successful, but he took 39 wickets with his off-spin, including his best county return, six for 83 against Hampshire at Bournemouth. His full season figures were 757 runs and 75 wickets.

== Somerset captain ==
After the 1964 season, Kerslake went into legal practice and did not play first-class cricket at all in the following three seasons. In 1968, however, following the retirement as Somerset captain of Colin Atkinson, Kerslake reappeared as captain of the side. With the side in transition, it was not an easy appointment, and an injury before the start of the season did not help, as he was able to play in only one of the opening six matches. Thereafter, Wisden wrote, "it seemed his innate modesty prevented him from developing his skills to the full. His brilliant fielding never wavered, but his batting and bowling, both of value on occasions, were not given full rein." The Somerset cricket historian David Foot wrote: "It simply wasn't in his nature to parade his skills when there were more experienced county cricketers around."

The statistics support these opinions. Kerslake made 525 runs at an average of exactly 15 runs per innings, with just one innings over 50, and he bowled fewer than 40 overs, taking only six wickets. In 24 matches, however, he held 34 catches. Somerset's early dismissal from the Gillette Cup that season, while Kerslake was injured, meant that he never played one-day cricket. At the end of the season, he returned to the law and did not play first-class cricket for the county side again.

== Later career ==
Kerslake continued to play Minor Counties cricket for Somerset's second eleven until the late 1970s and twice, in 1974 and 1976, was picked for the Minor Counties representative side against the touring team.

In more recent years, he has been involved in administrative roles in Somerset cricket as chairman of cricket and latterly as president. He was, according to Foot, a highly influential figure in Somerset's years of success in the early 1980s and a "father confessor" figure to the top players. In his professional life, he is now a consultant on probate and tax issues to the legal company Clarke Willmott, based in the Taunton office.

Sporting positions
Preceded by Colin Atkinson	Somerset County Cricket Captain; 1968	Succeeded by Brian Langford
