= Ken Biddulph =

English cricketer (1932–2003)

Personal information
- Full name: Kenneth David Biddulph
- Born: 29 May 1932; Chingford, London, England
- Died: 7 January 2003 (aged 70); Amberley, Gloucestershire, England
- Batting: Right-handed
- Bowling: Right-arm fast-medium
- Role: Bowler

Domestic team information
- Years: Team
- 1955–1961: Somerset
- 1962–1972: Durham
- FC debut: 13 July 1955 Somerset v Worcestershire
- Last FC: 11 August 1961 Somerset v Glamorgan
- List A debut: 4 May 1964 Durham v Hertfordshire
- Last List A: 19 July 1972 Durham v Surrey

Career statistics
Competition	First-class	List A
Matches	91	5
Runs scored	468	1
Batting average	6.78	1.00
100s/50s	0/0	0/0
Top score	41	1*
Balls bowled	15,070	366
Wickets	270	5
Bowling average	27.61	33.80
5 wickets in innings	10	0
10 wickets in match	0	0
Best bowling	6/30	3/20
Catches/stumpings	37/–	0/–
- Source: CricketArchive, 16 May 2010

Kenneth David Biddulph (29 May 1932 – 7 January 2003) played first-class cricket for Somerset between 1955 and 1961, and later appeared in List A cricket matches while playing Minor Counties cricket for Durham between 1962 and 1972. He was born in Chingford, Essex and died at his home in Amberley, Gloucestershire.

Ken Biddulph was a right-arm fast-medium bowler and a tail-end right-handed batsman. Colin McCool, who played alongside Biddulph on the Somerset side of the late 1950s, was not complimentary about Biddulph's abilities as an opening bowler in his ghosted book Cricket is a Game (1960), though Biddulph took a total of 162 wickets over the 1959 and 1960 seasons.

== Cricket career ==
Having played for the Somerset second eleven in 1954, Biddulph made his first-class debut in two matches during the 1955 season, taking three wickets in his first match against Worcestershire. There were seven first-class matches in 1956 and three in 1957. In the match against Derbyshire at Derby in 1956, he took five wickets for 46 runs in Derbyshire's first innings, finishing the innings off with a spell of five for 8 with the second new ball.

Biddulph gained a more regular place in the first team in 1958 as the deputy for regular fast-medium bowler Bryan Lobb, playing in almost half the matches as Somerset finished third in the County Championship, the county's highest position since 1892. In his first match of the season, against Kent at Dartford, he took six second-innings wickets for 64 runs, his best career performance to that date. He improved that performance later in the season in the home match against Worcestershire at Taunton, when he and Bill Alley took all the wickets as Worcestershire were dismissed for 68; Biddulph's share was six for 34.

Lobb retired from regular first-class cricket at the end of the 1958 season to become a teacher, and Biddulph stepped up in 1959 to be Somerset's regular opening bowler, usually forming a not-much-more-than-medium-paced opening attack with Alley or Ken Palmer. He took 79 wickets at an average of 24.35 and was awarded his county cap. He took five or more wickets in an innings four times and improved his own personal best with six for 30 in the match against the Combined Services at Taunton, and these were the best figures of his entire career. His figures for the 1960 season were similar: 83 wickets at an average of 27.28.

In its review of Somerset's 1960 season, Wisden Cricketers' Almanack wrote that lack of a match winning fast bowler was the main cause for the team's poor performance: "Biddulph, Palmer, and Alley bowled accurately enough, but their medium-fast deliveries lacked penetrative power," it wrote. In the 1961 season, Palmer's bowling became much more successful, but Biddulph, by contrast, lost form. He dropped out of the first team halfway through the season and at the end the season, he was not re-engaged. In an article after Biddulph's death, the cricket author Stephen Chalke wrote: "[His] moment on the stage had passed... Ken Biddulph quickly realized when his contract was not renewed in 1961. 'The sports shop in Taunton had a cut-out of me in the window, bowling. And the next time I walked past, it had gone.'"

== After Somerset ==
Biddulph went into League cricket on leaving Somerset and was a regular in Durham's Minor Counties side from 1962 until 1969, reappearing in four matches during 1972. In this period, he played five List A matches for Durham in the Gillette Cup competition.

Biddulph joined the staff at Wycliffe College in Stonehouse, Gloucestershire as the Cricket and Squash professional in 1985. He retired at the age of 60 in 1992, but he was active in cricket coaching in the West Country almost up to his death.
