= Jimmy Cook =

South African cricketer (born 1953)

Personal information
- Full name: Stephen James Cook
- Born: 31 July 1953 (age 73); Johannesburg, Transvaal Province, Union of South Africa
- Batting: Right-handed
- Bowling: Right-arm off break
- Role: Batsman
- Relatives: Stephen Cook (son)

International information
- National side: South Africa
- Test debut (cap 247): 13 November 1992 v India
- Last Test: 25 August 1993 v Sri Lanka
- ODI debut (cap 1): 10 November 1991 v India
- Last ODI: 2 September 1993 v Sri Lanka

Domestic team information
- Years: Team
- 1972/73–1984/95: Transvaal
- 1989–1991: Somerset

Career statistics
Competition	Test	ODI	FC	LA
Matches	3	4	270	286
Runs scored	107	67	21,143	10,639
Batting average	17.83	16.75	50.58	41.39
100s/50s	0/0	0/0	64/87	24/63
Top score	43	35	313*	177
Balls bowled	–	–	144	6
Wickets	–	–	3	1
Bowling average	–	–	35.66	4.00
5 wickets in innings	–	–	0	0
10 wickets in match	–	–	0	0
Best bowling	–	–	2/25	1/4
Catches/stumpings	0/–	1/–	157/–	89/–
- Source: CricketArchive, 15 January 2010

Stephen James Cook (born 31 July 1953) is a former South African association footballer and cricketer who played in three cricket Test matches and four One Day Internationals from 1991 to 1993. His son Stephen Cook played for Gauteng and the national side, the Proteas. He holds the unique distinction of having faced the first ball of South Africa's international cricket match since readmission.

== Career ==
He played football for Wits University while studying for a teaching degree in the late seventies and featured in the 1978 Mainstay Cup Final.

Cook was a prolific opening batsman both in his native South Africa and for Somerset County Cricket Club but South Africa's exclusion from Test cricket cost him a significant Test career. He played in all 19 of South Africa's 'unofficial Test matches' against rebel sides. He made his ODI debut on 10 November 1991 against India at the Eden Gardens in Kokata, which was also coincidentally South Africa's historic first ever One Day International, as South Africa made a comeback to international cricket after a long hiatus serving a suspension owing to apartheid policies. He was also the first cap of South Africa's first ever official ODI side and he faced the first ball of South Africa's first ODI match while batting as an opener. On his ODI debut, he was dismissed for 17 runs after being caught on the crease putting himself under jeopardy over lbw dismissal due to lack of feet movement. He walked towards the pavilion after being dismissed by Javagal Srinath, facing 48 deliveries without scoring a boundary. Cook became the first ever South African to have faced the white ball in an ODI and coincidentally his son Stephen Cook was also the first South African to face the pink ball as well as the first ever delivery in a day-night Test match.

He made his test debut on 13 November 1992, a year after having made his ODI debut against the same opponents India. He opened the batting for South Africa in their historic first test appearance at home soil since readmission and became the first South African batter to have faced a ball in test cricket after the end of apartheid induced ban on South Africa. Aged 39 and having waited two decades for an official Test cap, he edged Kapil Dev's opening ball, a late outswinger, to third slip in the first test between South Africa and India at Durban in November 1992, to become the first debutant to be dismissed by the first ball of a Test match; Leon Garrick of the West Indies also suffered the fate of similar nature nine years later.

Originally a middle-order batsman for Transvaal, his career blossomed when he converted to the opening position. He formed a formidable opening partnership with Henry Fotheringham, helping the Transvaal dominate the domestic scene in the 1980s. He captained the province later on in his career, and remains the third highest run scorer in South African first class cricket.

Ignored by county cricket in England until late in his career, he scored over 7,500 runs for Somerset in his three seasons with the club, including 28 hundreds. In 270 first-class matches, he scored 21,143 runs with a top score of 313* at an average of 50.58. He scored 64 first-class hundreds. In 286 List A cricket games, he made 10,639 runs at 41.39 with a best of 177.

After Cook retired he became director of coaching with the UCBSA, and had an unsuccessful spell with Hampshire which ended in 2002. As a coach at King Edward School in Johannesburg he oversaw the development of Graeme Smith.

Sporting positions
Preceded by Malcolm Marshall	Hampshire cricket coach 2000–2002	Succeeded by Paul Terry
