= Jason Kerr (cricketer) =

English cricketer and coach

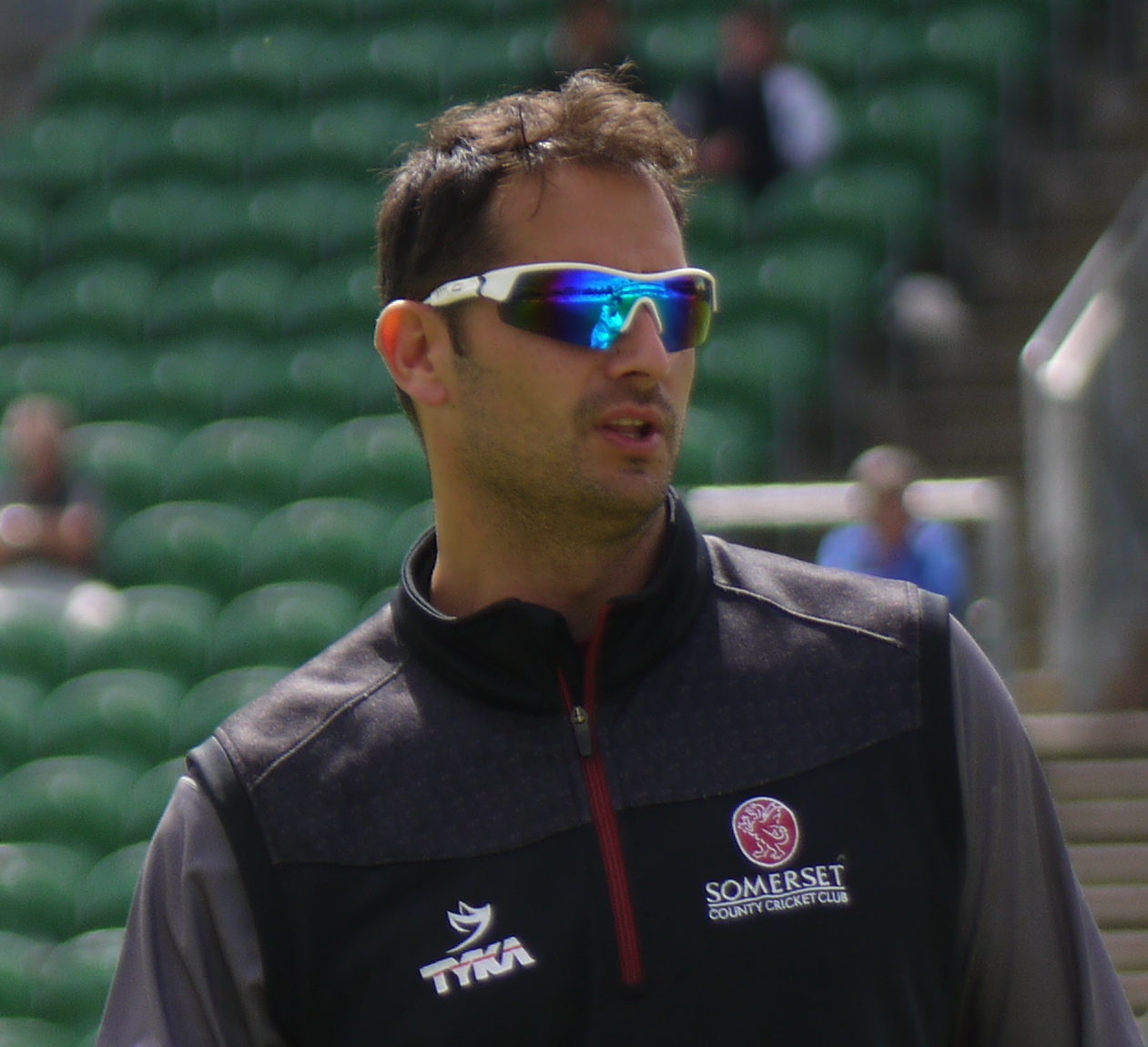

Personal information
- Full name: Jason Ian Douglas Kerr
- Born: 7 April 1974 (age 52); Bolton, Greater Manchester, England
- Batting: Right-handed
- Bowling: Right-arm medium-fast
- Role: All-rounder; Somerset Head Coach

Domestic team information
- Years: Team
- 1993–2001: Somerset
- 2002: Derbyshire
- FC debut: 8 May 1993 Somerset v Australians
- Last FC: 18 September 2002 Derbyshire v Worcestershire
- LA debut: 16 May 1993 Somerset v Lancashire
- Last LA: 22 September 2002 Derbyshire v Middlesex

Career statistics
Competition	FC	LA
Matches	65	113
Runs scored	1,693	769
Batting average	21.98	13.25
100s/50s	0/8	0/2
Top score	80	65*
Balls bowled	8,074	4,379
Wickets	129	124
Bowling average	40.38	30.08
5 wickets in innings	2	0
10 wickets in match	0	n/a
Best bowling	7/23	4/28
Catches/stumpings	18/–	18/–
- Source: CricketArchive, 4 August 2016

Jason Ian Douglas Kerr (born 7 April 1974 in Bolton, Greater Manchester) is an English cricket coach and former first-class cricketer, who is currently head coach of Somerset County Cricket Club.

An all-rounder, he played as right-handed batsman, who bowled right-arm medium-fast. He played first-class cricket for Somerset from 1993, before moving to Derbyshire in 2001.

After back injury curtailed his career at the end of 2002, Bridgwater Cricket Club appointed Kerr as director of coaching in 2004 to spearhead their West of England Premier League promotion bid. He succeeded Ben Wellington, who resigned in early February 2004 because of his commitments as a full-time coach at Somerset's Centre of Excellence. Kerr returned to Somerset as a self-employed coach in 2005, before taking up the Academy Director post full-time in February 2006, replacing the ECB bound Kevin Shine. At the end of the 2013 season, Kerr was promoted to the role of First XI bowling coach.

In October 2017, following the departure of Director of Cricket Matthew Maynard, Kerr was promoted to head coach of Somerset.
