= Colin Atkinson =

English cricketer

Personal information
- Full name: Colin Ronald Michael Atkinson
- Born: 23 July 1931; Thornaby, Yorkshire, England
- Died: 25 June 1991 (aged 59); Glastonbury, England
- Batting: Right-handed
- Bowling: Right-arm medium, legbreak

Domestic team information
- Years: Team
- 1959–1967: Somerset
- First-class debut: 10 June 1959 Minor Counties v Indians
- Last First-class: 6 September 1967 Somerset v Lancashire

Career statistics
Competition	First-class	List A
Matches	164	12
Runs scored	3796	153
Batting average	19.07	17.00
100s/50s	0/13	0/0
Top score	97	42*
Balls bowled	13314	444
Wickets	192	7
Bowling average	31.15	35.14
5 wickets in innings	7	0
10 wickets in match	0	n/a
Best bowling	7/54	2/28
Catches/stumpings	77/–	6/–
- Source: Cricinfo, 4 October 2009

Colin Ronald Michael Atkinson CBE (23 July 1931 – 25 June 1991) was an English first-class cricketer, schoolmaster and the headmaster of Millfield School.

== Education ==
Born at Thornaby, Yorkshire, Atkinson was educated at St. Mary's Grammar School, Hummersknott, Darlington and later at Durham University, where he studied history, Latin, and English. After graduation Atkinson took a postgraduate Certificate in education at Loughborough College and an external degree in education at Queen's University Belfast and another in psychology back at Durham.

After university he was, in the 1950s, commissioned into the Royal Northumberland Fusiliers, serving in Ireland and Kenya.

Before joining the staff at Millfield in 1960, he had taught at both Great Ayton and at Darlington. Atkinson was appointed Headmaster at Millfield in 1971 upon the retirement of the school's founder RJO Meyer. He was awarded a CBE for his work in education in 1989. During his time as Millfield headmaster, he acquired a nickname that he did not like of "Colin the builder". He retired in 1990. Atkinson was married to Shirley and they had three children: David, Sally and Jonny, himself a first-class cricketer.

== Cricket ==
As a cricketer, Atkinson was a right-handed middle-order batsman and a right-arm leg-break bowler. While an undergraduate and postgraduate (and during his National Service), he played from 1951 to 1958 for Northumberland in the Minor Counties as a professional. In 1959 he switched to Durham, then also a Minor County, and appeared for the Minor Counties representative side in the first-class match against the Indian touring side, his first first-class appearance.

Having joined the staff at Millfield, he was approached to join Somerset for the 1960 season, the new captain at Somerset that season being, like Atkinson, a Teessider, Harold Stephenson. In 1960, Atkinson appeared only in the school holidays, and achieved little with the bat, though he took his first five-wicket haul, five for 56, against Kent on the spin-friendly pitch at Clarence Park, Weston-super-Mare. Wisden pronounced that he was "a valuable acquisition".

In the following two seasons, released from his school duties for the summer terms, he played almost all matches for Somerset, making useful runs in the lower middle order and taking rather expensive wickets: his bowling average in both seasons was comfortably over 30 runs per wicket. He was awarded his county cap in 1961 and made his first half-centuries in 1962. His seven wickets for 54 runs against Gloucestershire at the County Ground, Taunton in 1962 remained his best bowling performance.

But in 1963, with arthritis affecting his spinning and his schoolmastering duties increasing, he played only twice and in 1964 not at all. Then, at the end of the 1964 season, Stephenson, who had been injured for most of it, stepped down from the Somerset captaincy. Bill Alley, rumbustious Australian all-rounder, who had deputised as captain in Stephenson's absence in 1964, was not seen as a long-term captain, and Atkinson was released from school duties to take the job for 1965. He was an instant success: Somerset led the County Championship table in June 1965, an unaccustomed position, and though Atkinson's batting was unreliable – he averaged less than 15 runs per innings for the season – and his spin bowling days were over, he developed as a tight medium-paced bowler, taking 38 wickets at under 24 runs apiece and complementing Somerset's pace attack of Fred Rumsey and Ken Palmer.

Somerset finished seventh in 1965, and third in 1966, equalling their then highest-ever placing in the Championship. In 1966, Atkinson's bowling fell away, but he advanced as a batsman, making 1120 runs in all matches, though without a century. Somerset won more games than in any other season, 13, and also reached the semi-final of the knock-out competition. It was, said Wisden, "their most successful season".

1967 was Atkinson's final season as a player. His batting fell away, though he got closer than ever before to the elusive century, with 97 against Warwickshire at Edgbaston in late August. His final duty was to lead Somerset in the Gillette Cup knock-out final at Lord's, but the game was a disappointment, and Kent won the match.

Having retired from playing, Atkinson remained influential as a cricket administrator inside the Somerset club. He was club chairman when the county finally won its first trophies in 1979 and, less happily, he was president during the period when Viv Richards, Joel Garner and Ian Botham were leaving the club in some acrimony. As at Millfield, Atkinson was responsible for a lot of building work at the Taunton ground, where he supervised the construction of the new pavilion. Atkinson died on 25 June 1991 at Glastonbury, Somerset, aged 59.

== Publication ==
- "Experiment in closed-circuit television at Millfield School" – with Peter Turner. 1971 – Published by the National Committee for Audio-Visual Aids in Education. ISBN 0-900553-16-2

== See also ==
- Somerset County Cricket Club
- Millfield

Sporting positions
Preceded by Harold Stephenson	Somerset County Cricket Captain; 1965–1967	Succeeded by Roy Kerslake
