= Eric Bryant (cricketer) =

English cricketer

Personal information
- Full name: Leonard Eric Bryant
- Born: 2 June 1936; Weston-super-Mare, Somerset, England
- Died: 28 November 1999 (aged 63); Brent Knoll, Somerset, England
- Batting: Left-handed
- Bowling: Slow left-arm orthodox
- Role: Bowler

Domestic team information
- Years: Team
- 1958–1960: Somerset
- FC debut: 31 May 1958 Somerset v Sussex
- Last FC: 29 July 1960 Somerset v Derbyshire

Career statistics
Competition	First-class
Matches	22
Runs scored	133
Batting average	8.86
100s/50s	0/0
Top score	17
Balls bowled	2,288
Wickets	34
Bowling average	27.73
5 wickets in innings	1
10 wickets in match	0
Best bowling	5/64
Catches/stumpings	10/–
- Source: CricketArchive, 6 July 2008

Leonard Eric Bryant (2 June 1936 – 28 November 1999), played first-class cricket for Somerset between 1958 and 1960.

A left-handed lower order batsman and a slow left-arm spin bowler whose action was allegedly modelled on that of Tony Lock, Bryant played 15 matches for the Somerset side that finished third in the County Championship in 1958, equalling the best-ever finish by the county to that time. He took only 25 wickets, but that included five in an innings – five for 64 – against Worcestershire to win the match where Australian Colin McCool made his highest score in English cricket. Wisden noted that Bryant "showed promise".

However, he played only a handful matches in the drier summer of 1959 and in his first first-class game of 1960, against Gloucestershire at Bath, he was no-balled five times by umpire Hugo Yarnold for throwing. Though he reappeared in two further matches that summer without incident, he was not re-engaged by Somerset at the end of the season and did not appear again in first-class cricket.
