= Bryan Lobb =

English cricketer

Personal information
- Full name: Bryan Lobb
- Born: 11 January 1931; Bournville, Birmingham, England
- Died: 3 May 2000 (aged 69); Glastonbury, Somerset, England
- Batting: Right-handed
- Bowling: Right-arm fast-medium
- Role: Bowler

Domestic team information
- Years: Team
- 1953: Warwickshire
- 1955–1969: Somerset
- FC debut: 17 June 1953 Warwickshire v Oxford University
- Last FC: 30 June 1969 Somerset v Glamorgan

Career statistics
Competition	First-class
Matches	116
Runs scored	624
Batting average	5.20
100s/50s	0/0
Top score	42
Balls bowled	19,426
Wickets	370
Bowling average	23.67
5 wickets in innings	15
10 wickets in match	2
Best bowling	7/43
Catches/stumpings	24/–
- Source: CricketArchive, 29 December 2008

Bryan Lobb (11 January 1931 – 3 May 2000) was a first-class cricketer who played once for Warwickshire and then more than 100 times for Somerset County Cricket Club. He was born in Bournville, Birmingham and died at Glastonbury, Somerset.

== Style and personality ==
Lobb was a tall gangling right-arm fast-medium bowler and a No 11 batsman. His fielding was the subject of amusement: "He changed course a dozen times while the ball trickled straight to him at long-leg," wrote Somerset's historian, David Foot. His batting reflected the fact that, in Foot's words, "he turned ungainliness into an art form" and he was also a poor judge of a run. In Lobb's obituary in Wisden in 2001, the story of a run-out at Chesterfield is told by Lobb himself: "I once got run out by deep mid-on, who overtook me as I unwisely strolled to the other end".

But his bowling was no joke. From a long run-up, he got inswinging movement through the air and bounce from the pitch, all delivered with a flurry of arms and legs and fair hair.

== Cricket career ==
Lobb's one match for Warwickshire came in 1953 and brought him two wickets but no contract. He arrived in the West Country in 1955 with Somerset's cricket at a low ebb: bottom of the County Championship for the preceding three seasons and with bowling largely dependent on spin. He went straight into the first team for the first match of the season and stayed there, winning his county cap in his first season. Wisden reported that he "appeared to be the best discovery made by Somerset for some years and he headed his county's bowling with 86 wickets at 25.59 each". In all matches he took 90 wickets. Somerset still finished at the foot of the Championship table, however.

Signs of improvement for the team as a whole came in 1956, with a rise to 15th place out of 17. In a wet summer, Lobb's swing and seam bowling was less effective and Wisden noted that he "would have been more effective with a reliable new-ball partner". He still took 82 wickets at an average of 26.75; Somerset's other non-spin bowlers managed only 38 Championship wickets between them.

The 1957 season was Lobb's best: in all matches, he took 110 wickets, becoming the first Somerset pace bowler to achieve that feat since the Second World War. The average too, at 19.48 runs per wicket, was much reduced. Against Cambridge University he took seven for 63 and four for 23 for the best match figures of his career.

In 1958, Lobb produced both the finest bowling and batting performances of his career. At Bath against Yorkshire he reached the for-him dizzy heights of 42 in a last wicket stand of 84 with Geoff Lomax. Then at Lord's against Middlesex he took seven wickets for 43 runs on a pitch that Wisden called "difficult". By the end of July, he had taken 51 first-class wickets at an average of 21.78. But there his season ended, through injury.

Though Lobb played in the first few Somerset matches of the 1959 season, he was from this point onwards essentially a part-time cricketer, his career interrupted first by his studies at St Luke's College, Exeter and then by his career as a schoolmaster at the Edgarley Hall prep school which is attached to Millfield School. He played a few games in 1960, reappeared in 1963, then again in 1967 and 1969. As late as 1979 he was involved in warm-up matches for the Sri Lankans in advance of the ICC Trophy. He died on 3 May 2000 in Glastonbury, Somerset.
