= James Hildreth =

English cricketer

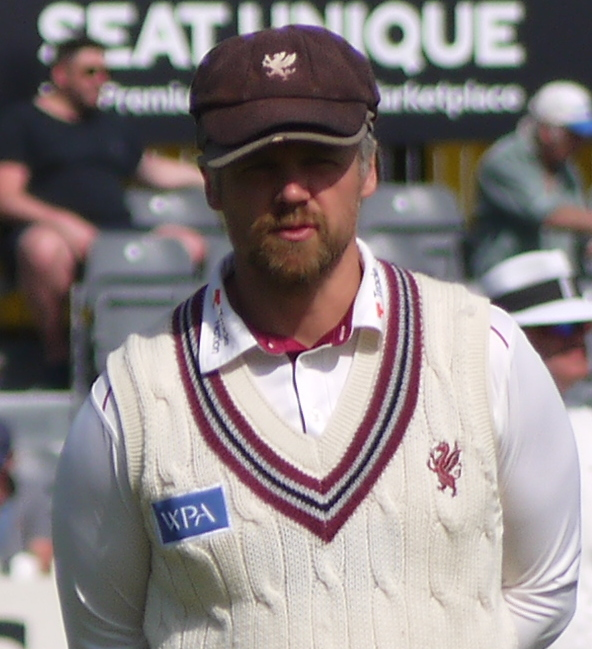
- Hildreth in 2022

Personal information
- Full name: James Charles Hildreth
- Born: 9 September 1984 (age 42); Milton Keynes, Buckinghamshire, England
- Height: 5 ft 10 in (1.78 m)
- Batting: Right-handed
- Bowling: Right-arm medium-fast
- Role: Batsman

Domestic team information
- Years: Team
- 2002–2022: Somerset (squad no. 25)
- 2002: Somerset Cricket Board
- 2015: Marylebone Cricket Club
- First-class debut: 10 September 2003 Somerset v Derbyshire
- Last First-class: 19 May 2022 Somerset v Hampshire
- List A debut: 29 August 2002 Somerset Cricket Board v Cornwall
- Last List A: 10 August 2022 Somerset v Durham

Career statistics
Competition	FC	LA	T20
Matches	286	223	206
Runs scored	18,000	6,100	3,906
Batting average	41.00	35.46	24.56
100s/50s	47/81	8/29	1/17
Top score	303*	159	107*
Balls bowled	576	150	169
Wickets	6	6	10
Bowling average	82.00	30.83	24.70
5 wickets in innings	0	0	0
10 wickets in match	0	0	0
Best bowling	2/39	2/26	3/24
Catches/stumpings	250/–	81/–	73/–
- Source: ESPNcricinfo, 15 August 2022

James Charles Hildreth (born 9 September 1984) is a former English professional cricketer who played for Somerset County Cricket Club. He attended Millfield School, Somerset. He is a right-handed batsman and occasional right-arm medium pace bowler. Hildreth represented England at all youth levels including the 2003–04 Under-19 World cup held in Bangladesh. He made his first-class debut in 2003 and became a regular member of the side from the start of the 2004 season. The James Hildreth Stand was opened by him at Somerset County Cricket Ground on 21 September 2022.

== Domestic career ==
=== Early life and career ===
Born in Milton Keynes, Buckinghamshire, Hildreth attended Millfield, a private school in Street, Somerset described as a "great nursery of the game [of cricket]". He finished third in the school's batting averages in 2000, with 30.38 and a top-score of 75 not out. The following season his batting figures were significantly worse—he averaged just 14.30—but he topped the school's bowling averages with 11.41, his best figures being 4/2. (Note: 4/2: Signifies the bowler claimed four wickets and two runs were scored while he was bowling.) In 2002, Hildreth was one of three Millfield pupils chosen to play in the annual ECB try-out match. He didn't score enough runs to be included in Wisden's school batting averages in 2002, (Note: Wisden's criteria for printing school cricketer's averages are 150 runs or 10 wickets.) but his 17 wickets taken at an average of 13.05 rated him as the school's joint highest wicket-taker, and third in the averages. In July 2002, Hildreth made his first appearance for the Somerset Second XI, replacing Peter Trego who, after scoring 188 runs in the first-innings, left the match due to being called up to the first-team. Hildreth bowled 13.1 wicket-less overs during Warwickshire Second XI's first-innings, and scored 32 in Somerset's second-innings, as they lost by an innings. The following month, he made his List A debut, representing Somerset Cricket Board against Cornwall in the first round of the Cheltenham and Gloucester Trophy. Hildreth claimed one wicket during his six overs, and added four runs from number seven.

Hildreth captained Millfield in 2003, and performed well given the extra responsibility: he finished top of the school's batting averages, his 563 runs coming at 62.55, and trailed only one team-mate in the bowling averages. After a number of games for the Second XI, Hildreth made his debut for Somerset in a National League match against Lancashire, but didn't bat as the match was abandoned due to rain. A few days later, he scored a century for the Second XI in a three-day match, opening Somerset's second-innings against Sussex Second XI. In mid-September, he made his first-class debut during a County Championship match against Derbyshire, scoring nine in the first-innings, followed by a duck in the second. In the nine National League matches Hildreth played in 2003, he scored 120 runs at an average of 15.00, with a high-score of 30 against Lancashire at the County Ground, Taunton.

=== First-team regular ===
Playing in his (and Somerset's) first County Championship match of the 2004 season, Hildreth made his debut first-class century in the first-innings against Durham, scoring 101 in an innings described by team-mate Peter Bowler as "attractive but very orthodox". He added 72 more runs in the second-innings. He passed 50 in three of the four matches he played in June, but didn't score another century in the Championship until September, when he scored 108 while sharing a third-wicket partnership of 207 with Jamie Cox against Nottinghamshire. He finished the season with 760 first-class runs scored at an average of just over 40. He fared slightly less successfully in the one-day competitions – he averaged around 30 in both List A and Twenty20 formats. His highest score in the Twenty20 Cup was the 66 he made against Glamorgan off 33 balls. The following season, Hildreth was batting with Carl Gazzard as Somerset beat a touring Australia side for only the second time ever at Taunton, and hit the winning runs as Somerset beat Lancashire in the final of the 2005 T20 Cup at the Oval.

=== Later career ===
In April 2008, Hildreth's contract was renewed to 2011, following his most successful season for Somerset, scoring 1147 at 52.14. On 18 April 2009, Hildreth hit his highest ever first-class score with 303 not out at Taunton, becoming the second Englishman (after Harold Gimblett) to score over 300 runs in an innings for Somerset and scoring the earliest triple century in an English season. In 2012, he scored the first T20 century by someone batting at number five. During the 2015 season, Hildreth scored 1,620 runs at an average of 55.86 in first-class cricket. He scored the winning runs as Somerset won the 2019 One-Day Cup.

He announced that he would retire at the end of the 2022 season, but after suffering a hamstring injury retired with immediate effect on 16 August 2022. At the point of his retirement, he had made more appearances than any other Somerset player, and was Somerset's all-time leading run-scorer in T20 cricket, and their third-highest in first-class cricket.

== International career ==
=== England Under-15s ===
Hildreth's first taste of international cricket came during the 2000 Under-15 World Challenge. He played in all four of England's matches in the competition, opening the batting on each occasion. He finished the tournament trailing only Samit Patel among England run-scorers, making 105 runs. However, after scoring his highest score of the tournament in the first game, 57 against India, his scores got progressively lower, 42 against the West Indies, and he failed to reach double figures against Netherlands or in the semi-final against Pakistan.

=== England Under-19s ===
In 2003, Hildreth made his debut for England Under-19s during the third youth Test against South Africa Under-19s. After scoring 14 in the first-innings, Hildreth top-scored for England in the second, hitting 116 runs off 189 balls. Despite his efforts—he was the only England batsman to pass 50 in either innings—England lost by an innings and 163 runs. He remained with the squad for the one-day series, but only managed to score four in his only batting appearance, as both the second and third ODIs were washed-out. Hildreth was part of the England squad to compete in the 2004 U-19 Cricket World Cup. He made his first appearance in the competition in England's second group-stage match, scoring 38 off 30 with 2 fours and 2 sixes against Uganda. He remained not out in his next two innings, on 30 against South Africa and 1 Zimbabwe. In the final league-stage match, he was dismissed for 7 against Pakistan in a low-scoring match that saw England qualify for the semi-finals. Playing against West Indies in the semi-final, Hildreth scored 27 off 29 balls—one of only four England players to reach double-figures—as England failed to reach their target of 250.

Hildreth's final matches for England Under-19s were playing later in 2004, as they hosted Bangladesh for three Tests and three scheduled ODIs. He scored 27 and 14 in the first Test, which England won by five wickets. In the second Test, played at Hildreth's home ground in Taunton, he scored 210 in "a near flawless innings with an explosive conclusion" to help England to an eight wicket victory. The score, at the time the sixth highest in youth Tests, was described by Bangladesh's coach Richard McInnes as "one of the best innings I have ever had the pleasure of seeing." Hildreth didn't play in the third Test match, but in his last match for the team he recorded a man of the match performance to defeat the Bangladeshis in the only completed ODI. Batting at number four as England chased 190 to win, Hildreth scored 53 runs off 42 balls, with 9 fours and 1 six.

=== England performance squad and Lions ===
In the English winter of 2007–08, Hildreth was included in the England Performance Programme XI to train in India, playing two matches against 'Madras Rubber Factory'. In the first match, he scored 136 runs at quicker than a run-a-ball, and put on partnership of 209 with Jonathan Trott. In the second, he made 63 runs, and shared another large partnership with Trott, the pair this time putting on a 155 runs together. Returning to India in January with the England Lions, Hildreth played in four matches, although he wasn't included in the starting eleven for the two Duleep Trophy matches. He failed to reach double figures in either innings of the three-day match against Mumbai Cricket Association XI, He performed slightly better in the one-day matches, with a score of 7 against Maharashtra Cricket Association XI being preceded by 38 against Mumbai Cricket Association XI and followed by 43 against Saurashtra Cricket Association XI.

=== 2005 Ashes ===
Hildreth was used as a substitute fielder throughout the 2005 Ashes series and took a catch to dismiss Ricky Ponting in the first Test at Lord's off the bowling of Matthew Hoggard.

== Career Best Performances ==
Updated 1 June 2018

	Batting				Bowling			
	Score	Fixture	Venue	Season	Analysis	Fixture	Venue	Season
FC	303*	Somerset v Warwickshire	Taunton	2009	2–39	Somerset v Hampshire	Taunton	2004
LA	159	Somerset v Glamorgan	Taunton	2018	2–26	Somerset v Worcestershire	Worcester	2008
T20	107*	Somerset v Welsh Dragons	Taunton	2012	3–24	Somerset v Glamorgan	Cardiff	2005
