= Brian Langford =

English cricketer (1935–2013)

Personal information
- Full name: Brian Anthony Langford
- Born: 17 December 1935; Birmingham, England
- Died: 12 February 2013 (aged 77); Taunton, Somerset, England
- Batting: Right-handed
- Bowling: Right-arm offbreak
- Role: Spin bowler

Domestic team information
- Years: Team
- 1953–1974: Somerset
- First-class debut: 6 June 1953 Somerset v Lancashire
- Last First-class: 31 August 1974 Somerset v Derbyshire
- List A debut: 22 May 1963 Somerset v Glamorgan
- Last List A: 11 July 1973 Somerset v Leicestershire

Career statistics
| Competition | First-class | List A |
|---|---|---|
| Matches | 510 | 66 |
| Runs scored | 7588 | 441 |
| Batting average | 13.59 | 12.97 |
| 100s/50s | 0/14 | 0/1 |
| Top score | 68* | 56 |
| Balls bowled | 89275 | 2585 |
| Wickets | 1410 | 65 |
| Bowling average | 24.79 | 24.24 |
| 5 wickets in innings | 83 | 0 |
| 10 wickets in match | 16 | n/a |
| Best bowling | 9/26 | 4/73 |
| Catches/stumpings | 229/– | 19/– |
- Source: CricketArchive, 7 October 2009

Brian Anthony Langford (17 December 1935 – 12 February 2013) was an English first-class cricketer who played as an off-spin bowler for Somerset. He captained the county from 1969 until 1971 and his career tally of 1,390 wickets ranks him third in the county's history, behind only Jack White and Arthur Wellard.

Langford made his debut for Somerset in 1953 at the Recreation Ground, Bath with an unremarkable appearance against Lancashire, taking just one wicket in an innings and 24 run loss. In the next match against Kent, starting the following day on the same ground, he took 8/96 in the first innings, bowling a 41 over spell to see the innings through. He helped secure victory for Somerset with another 6 wickets in the second innings. At only 17 years and 5 months, this ten-wicket haul made him the youngest player to do so in the County Championship, a record that stood until May 2007, when James Harris completed the feat a few days after his 17th birthday. A third game without break on the ground against Leicestershire brought further success for Langford, although his 6/53 in the first innings and 5/81 in the second weren't enough to prevent Somerset from slipping to a 144 run loss. Unfortunately for Somerset and Langford, the 26 wickets he took his opening three matches for the county accounted for just over half of his season's total, as he took just 25 more in the remaining 15 matches in 1953.

In a game against Lancashire in 1958, Langford finished the match with 15 wickets for 54 runs. This is the second best match figures for Somerset and his first innings' 9/26 is the third best performance in an innings. He finished the year with 116 wickets, a career best.

In 1969, he had the following remarkable analysis in the John Player League (40 over List A match) against Essex at Yeovil: 8 overs, 8 maidens, 0 runs, 0 wickets. He remains the only person to have bowled a full complement of overs in a List A match without conceding a single run.

== Notes ==
Sporting positions
| Preceded by Roy Kerslake | Somerset County Cricket Captain; 1969–1971 | Succeeded by Brian Close |
