= Somerset County Cricket Club =

English cricket club

- One Day name: Somerset

Personnel
- Captain: Lewis Gregory
- Coach: Jason Kerr
- Overseas player(s): Migael Pretorius; Riley Meredith (T20)

Team information
- Colours: First-class: List A & T20:
- Founded: 1875; 151 years ago
- Home ground: County Ground, Taunton
- Capacity: 8,500

History
- First-class debut: Lancashire in 1882 at Old Trafford
- Gillette Cup/Natwest Trophy wins: 3
- Royal London One-Day Cup wins: 1
- Sunday League wins: 1
- Twenty20 Cup wins: 3
- B&H Cup wins: 2
- Official website: somersetcountycc.co.uk
First-class
One-day
T20

Somerset County Cricket Club is one of eighteen first-class county clubs within the domestic cricket structure of England and Wales. It represents the historic county of Somerset. Founded in 1875, Somerset was initially regarded as a minor county until official first-class status was acquired in 1895. Somerset has competed in the County Championship since 1891 and has subsequently played in every top-level domestic cricket competition in England, although it has never won the County Championship. The club's limited overs team was formerly named the Somerset Sabres, but is now known only as Somerset.

Somerset's early history is complicated by arguments about its status. It is generally regarded as a minor county from its foundation in 1875 until 1890, apart from the 1882 to 1885 seasons when it is considered by substantial sources to have been an unofficial first-class team, holding important match status. There are, however, two matches involving W. G. Grace in 1879 and 1881 which are considered first-class by some authorities. In 1891, Somerset joined the County Championship, which had just become an officially recognised competition, and has important match status from 1891 to 1894. The county is classified as an official first-class team from 1895 by Marylebone Cricket Club (MCC) and the County Championship clubs; classified as a List A team since the beginning of limited overs cricket in 1963; and classified as a senior Twenty20 team since 2003.

Somerset has never won the County Championship. Their highest finish being second, which they achieved in 2001, 2010, 2012, 2016, 2018, 2019 and 2026. The club had many lean years until it won its first silverware in the late 1970s, winning both the Gillette Cup and John Player League in 1979. In the years since, Somerset have experienced some success in one-day cricket, winning the Gillette Cup on two further occasions, the Benson & Hedges Cup twice and the John Player League once more. The team has reached the final of the Twenty20 cup competition on eight occasions, winning it in 2005, 2023 and 2025. They won the 2019 Royal London One-Day Cup, their first since emerging victorious in the 2001 edition.

The club has its headquarters at the County Ground, Taunton, where in the present-day almost all of its games are played. Since 2005, Somerset also play at Taunton Vale against MCC Universities teams (including first-class matches in 2012 and 2015); Taunton Vale is also the regular home venue for the Second XI team. The club have played at a number of other grounds in their past, with a significant number of matches at Clarence Park (until 1996), Weston-super-Mare and the Recreation Ground, Bath (until 2011).

== Honours ==
=== First XI honours ===
- One-Day Cup (Note: Known as the Gillette Cup (1963–1980), NatWest Trophy (1981–2000) and C&G Trophy (2001–2006), Friends Provident Trophy (2007–2009), ECB 40 (2010–2013), Royal London One-Day Cup (2014–2022) and Metro Bank One-Day Cup (2023 onwards)) (4) – 1979, 1983, 2001, 2019
- National League (Note: Formerly known as the Sunday League (1969–1998). Ran until the end of the 2009 season.) (1) – 1979
- Benson & Hedges Cup (Note: Ran between 1972 and 2002.) (2) – 1981, 1982
- Twenty20 Cup (Note: Names have included the Twenty20 Cup (2003–2009), Friends Life t20 (2010–2013) and NatWest t20 Blast (2014–2017) and Vitality Blast (2018 onwards).) (3) – 2005, 2023, 2025

=== Second XI honours ===
- Minor Counties Championship (2) – 1961, 1965
- Second XI Championship (2) – 1994, 2004
- Second XI Twenty20 (1) – 2024

== History ==
=== Earliest cricket in Somerset ===
In the seventeenth century, the related sport of "Stow-Ball", or "Stob-Ball" was being played in north Somerset, as in neighbouring Gloucestershire and Wiltshire, as well as parts of Dorset. This sport most likely used either the base of a tree or its remaining stump as its wicket, as both 'stow' and 'stob' are dialect words for 'stump'. However, 'stow' could also refer to a frame used to support crawling tunnels in mines such as those lead mines in north Somerset, providing another possibility for the wicket. The ball was made of a leather case, stuffed with boiled quills, and was four inches in diameter, roughly the same size as a modern softball, while the bats, known as 'staves' were shaped similarly to a field hockey stick and typically made of withy or willow.

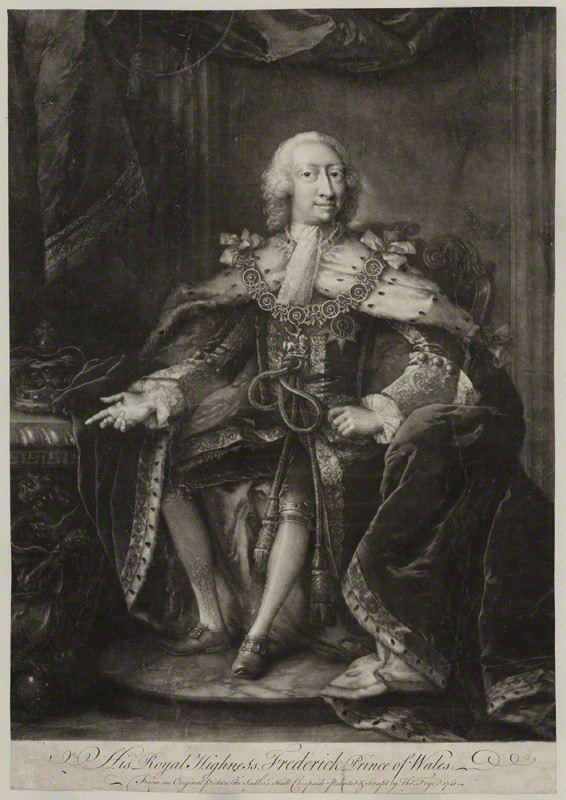
One of the earliest cricket matches played in Somerset was in memory of Frederick, Prince of Wales

The earliest confirmed reference to cricket in Somerset is a match on 13 July 1751 that was played in memory of the late Frederick, Prince of Wales who was a noted patron of the sport. The first officially organised club to be recognised in Somerset was Lansdown Cricket Club, formed in 1825, although a Bath cricket club seems to have preceded it with a similar collection of enthusiasts from around 1817–1824. With a limited number of other organised clubs to play, fixtures were few and far apart in the founding years, with matches being played against Clifton, Sidmouth and Teignmouth. Lansdown placed Somerset in the cricketing world, and played a number of matches against 'England XI' in various forms.

In 1865, the first attempt at a county side was made with the formation of Yeovil and County Cricket Club. They performed poorly in their opening matches against local club sides, and on one occasion, even lost three players to their opposition the day before the match was scheduled to begin. In spite of these problems, they did play a 'county' fixture, against the Gentlemen of Devon; the match was abandoned due to rain. The first recorded occasion of a Gentlemen of Somerset side playing comes five years previously however, when a Somerset side travelled down to Culm Vale to take on the Gentlemen of Devon, this match also resulting in a draw.

=== Origin of club ===
The formation of Somerset County Cricket Club was decided in 1875 after the playing of one such match between the Gentlemen of Somerset and the Gentlemen of Devon at Sidmouth in Devon. Having played a two-day match, which the Somerset team won by eight wickets, the Gentlemen of Somerset and their friends held a meeting and resolved that Somerset should have its own county cricket club. Somerset is the only one of the present first-class counties in English cricket whose county cricket club was founded outside the boundaries of the traditional county. After their resolution, the gentlemen continued playing games under the name Gentlemen of Somerset, but their fixtures became more regular; rather than occasional games against the Gentlemen of Devon, they played host to teams from Dorset and Devon in 1876, and in 1877 visited Dorset, Worcestershire, Warwickshire and Wiltshire in addition to their trip to Devon.

The following 1878 season, two matches were played by a Somerset team; a two-day match against Hertfordshire played at St Albans finished in a draw, while Worcestershire were beaten by an innings and 47 runs later in the month at Bath. In 1879, Somerset played nine matches, albeit one of them against a Wells team. During these early seasons, Somerset were never far from insolvency. An initial letter sent out after the formation of the club had only managed to raise £70 17s, while gate receipts in the first season raised the club £1 15s 8d. Despite this, fixtures continued to be arranged, and the amateurs kept on playing; bringing their own kit and paying for their own tickets for travel to away matches.

There are alternative versions of when Somerset's first first-class match took place, and matches in 1879 and 1881 are central to the statistics of W. G. Grace – see the article on Variations in first-class cricket statistics. If those games are discounted, then Somerset CCC played its initial first-class match against Lancashire CCC at Old Trafford on 8, 9 and 10 June 1882 and joined the (then unofficial) County Championship. This first-class status lasted for only four seasons: after the 1885 season, Somerset failed to arrange sufficient fixtures with the other first-class teams to be accorded first-class status.

In 1890, following a successful recruitment policy at universities by the club's first full-time secretary, Henry Murray-Anderdon, Somerset played 13 games, including 2 against Middlesex, winning 12 of them and tying the other against Middlesex, furthering their ambition to be a first-class county.

At the third annual meeting of The County Cricket Council on 9 December 1889 the counties decided to create a sub-committee to consider whether an official classification of the counties should exist and how counties might rise from one class to another. Somerset was one of the 6 counties represented on the committee. The committee met on 11 August 1890 and proposed three classes of counties. The existing 8 first-class counties would remain with Somerset one of 8 second-class counties proposed. A system of promotion and relegation was suggested. These proposals was debated at the fourth annual meeting of The County Cricket Council on 8 December 1890. They were not well received. Eventually a vote was taken on whether The County Cricket Council itself should be suspended sine die. The motion was passed on the casting vote of the chairman and The County Cricket Council effectively ceased to exist. "This utterly unexpected result fairly took those present by surprise, and they dispersed hurriedly – a most undignified ending to what we are compelled to describe as a most unbusinesslike meeting." Mr. H.T. Hewett and Mr. T. Spencer were present for Somerset. On the following day, 9 December 1890, the county secretaries met to decide the fixtures for 1891, which they did on the usual basis of arranging "home and home" matches against whichever counties they wished. "The most noticeable feature ... is the encouragement given to Somersetshire by the chief county clubs. Middlesex played the western shire last summer, but Kent, Surrey, Yorkshire, Gloucestershire and Lancashire will next summer test the merits of the eleven, which showed such good all round cricket, under Mr. H.T. Hewett's command, last year." By arranging these 12 matches against first-class counties Somerset became a de facto first-class county without any proposal or vote to that effect. Hewett, Spencer and Mr. W.N. Roe were present for Somerset.

=== Pre–First World War ===
Somerset CCC 1892

In Somerset's second season, 1892, they finished third, but it was to be 66 years before they finished as high again. Until the Great Depression, the team regularly comprised a number of more or less talented amateurs and just a handful of professionals. They enjoyed over many decades a reputation for cheerful inconsistency, highlighted by three wins over an all-conquering Yorkshire side in 1901 and 1902, when they did not lose to any other county.

Famous names from the pre–First World War period included the England players Sammy Woods, Lionel Palairet and Len Braund; the fast bowler Tom Richardson also played for the county once after his retirement from Surrey. In 1908, Woods persuaded the England rugby union international John Daniell to become captain with the team struggling financially, and Daniell stayed, mostly playing as captain and often acting as secretary too, for almost 20 years. However, in the immediate period before World War I, with the loss of the key amateurs who promoted the club to first-class status and financial difficulties forcing the club to dis-engage most of its few professionals, Somerset finished last four times in six years and lost fifteen and drew three of eighteen games in 1910.

=== Between the wars ===
In the first season of the County Championship after the First World War, 1919, Somerset finished fifth in the table, the highest since 1892. But that was the highest position in the inter-war years, and mostly the side finished at or below halfway down the table, though there were no more bottom places in this period.

The team continued to be a mix of a few amateurs and a few good professionals, with the side often made up with amateur players who appeared in only a few games. Among the amateurs, the west Somerset farmer Jack White, who succeeded Daniell as captain in 1927, played for England as a left-arm orthodox spinning all-rounder and also captained the Test side in Australia in 1928–29. The briefest Test match career of them all was "enjoyed" by another amateur, Jack MacBryan, whose only game for England was the rain-ruined match against the South Africans in 1924, in which he neither batted nor bowled. Of the professionals, fleeting international careers were enjoyed by the hard-hitting batsman Harold Gimblett, whose entry into first-class cricket was the stuff of legends, and by Arthur Wellard, fast bowler and a mighty smiter of sixes.

=== Post–Second World War ===
In postwar cricket, the happy-go-lucky Somerset attitude was no longer sustainable, and the side finished bottom of the Championship for four consecutive seasons from 1952. With the strong possibility of going out of business, drastic change was inevitable. Somerset recruited heavily from other countries, taking Colin McCool and Bill Alley from Australia, and from other counties. In 1958, under the captaincy of the first professional cricketer to captain the team, Maurice Tremlett, the side again finished third, and this was repeated in 1963 and 1966 under different captains, Harold Stephenson and Colin Atkinson, who later became headmaster at Millfield School.

There was a further dip in fortunes towards the end of the 1960s, but, though County Championship success continued to elude the county, Somerset finally found in the 1970s the makings of a successful one-day team under the captaincy of Yorkshireman Brian Close. A trio of world class players, Viv Richards, Joel 'Big Bird' Garner and the England all-rounder Ian Botham made the team for the first time in its long history a formidable trophy winning proposition.

The real success came after Close had retired. Under the captaincy of left-handed opener Brian Rose, Somerset won their first ever silverware by taking the Gillette Cup and the Sunday League in 1979. In the same 1979 season, Somerset's newfound ruthless streak provoked controversy in the Benson & Hedges Cup limited-overs competition when Rose declared the Somerset innings closed in the match against Worcestershire, in an attempt to safeguard passage through to the quarter-final on run rate: the county was subsequently disqualified from the competition at a special meeting of the Test and County Cricket Board. Rose also captained the side to the Benson & Hedges Cup in 1981 and 1982, and the renamed NatWest Trophy (formerly the Gillette Cup) in 1983. In September 1983, in the NatWest final at Lord's, Somerset beat Kent to win the trophy for the first time in their history.

Controversy returned to Somerset in the mid-1980s. With the successful side ageing, new captain Peter Roebuck led the move to make changes and the overseas stars Viv Richards and Joel Garner were sacked, replaced by the New Zealander Martin Crowe. Ian Botham resigned from Somerset in protest and moved to Worcestershire.

Somerset reached the NatWest Trophy final in 1999, but lost to Gloucestershire.

=== Twenty-first century ===
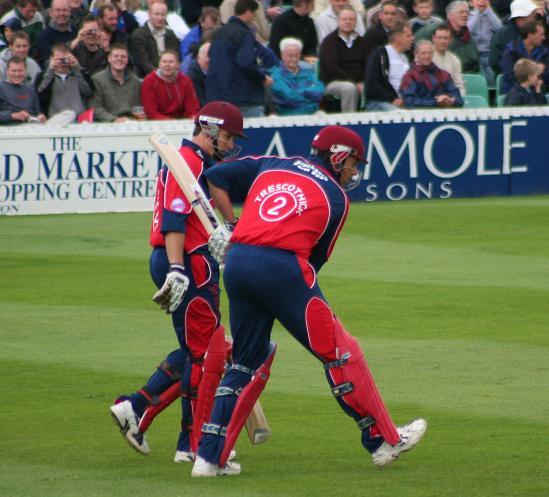
Somerset opening batsmen Matthew Wood and Marcus Trescothick walking out to meet Gloucestershire CCC, 27 June 2007

Somerset reached the finals of the renamed C & G Trophy final in 2001 and 2002, winning in 2001 over Leicestershire. In 2001, the team finished second in the first division of the County Championship, its highest-ever placing. But the county was relegated to the second division at the end of the following season.

Under the guidance of the Director of Cricket Brian Rose, the team adopted a youth policy and brought in overseas players Ricky Ponting and Graeme Smith to enable coaching of the young group of players. This led to Somerset winning the third Twenty20 Cup, beating Lancashire in the final at The Oval in July 2005.

The 2006 season was up and down in results, but in June 2006 Rose announced the signing for six weeks of the Australian cricket team opening batsman Justin Langer, while countryman Dan Cullen was on duty with Australia A. Langer responded by hitting the highest score in the county's first-class history, but without him, the team struggled in both short and long versions of the game, failed to repeat their Twenty20 success and languished at or near the bottom of both County Championship and Pro40 second division tables.

In 2007 Langer, having returned to the team, was named captain. Cameron White was the other overseas player. Somerset's season began brightly, including a county-record 850/7 declared against Middlesex in their first Championship match, but a few weeks later Somerset were on the wrong end of a huge total when they conceded 801/8 declared to Derbyshire. However, they recovered well from this setback and achieved promotion, returning to Division One of the Championship for the first time since 2002, after beating Essex at Chelmsford with five sessions to spare. They were also promoted to Division One of the Pro40 league.

While 2008 was an improved season, 2009 brought marginally less success. Langer announced his retirement from all forms of cricket at the end of the 2009 season, making the 2009 Champions League Twenty20 in India his last competitive competition for the club.

==== 2010–15 ====
On the departure of Justin Langer, Marcus Trescothick was named as club captain for the 2010 season. It was a memorable season for Somerset, although somewhat bitter-sweet. In one of the most successful seasons in the club's history, Somerset finished as runners-up in all major domestic competitions. In August the club went down to Hampshire in the Friends Provident t20 final, after failing to effect a run-out from the last ball that would have secured them the title. In the County Championship, they finished second to Nottinghamshire. While level on points at the close of play on the last day of the Championship season, Nottinghamshire lifted the title by virtue of more wins during the year. They were then beaten by Warwickshire in the Clydesdale Bank 40 final.

In the 2011 season, Somerset again performed well in all three domestic competitions finishing 4th in the County Championship, and runners up again in the Twenty20 competition to Leicestershire and also in the CB40 final to Surrey. Taunton-born keeper-batsman Jos Buttler secured a call up for England for 20/20 cricket. By virtue of finishing runners up in the domestic Twenty20 competition, Somerset qualified for the T20 Champions League competition in India featuring many of the world's best 20/20 teams. Roelof van der Merwe returned as their overseas player for this competition. Somerset performed exceptionally well, progressing from the preliminary round to the semi-final where they lost to the Mumbai Indians, in the process picking up considerable prize money.

During the 2012 season, Somerset were ravaged by injuries to the extent that on two occasions the county were reduced to their last 11 available players, with members of the coaching and support staff having to fill in as 12th men. Despite this it was another successful season with Somerset again finishing runners-up in the Championship, though they finished 24 points behind the winners, only losing one match all year. Nick Compton carried a batting lineup that at times missed key players such as Trescothick and Craig Kieswetter due to injury, averaging an incredible 99.25. In one-day competitions, Somerset couldn't quite make up for a poor start in the CB40, losing their first 4 games, before winning their next 6 completed matches and narrowly missing out on the semi-finals. In the reformatted t20, Somerset topped their group and won the home quarter-final against Essex to send them on another trip to finals day, only to fall short to Hampshire in the semi-final.

In 2013, Somerset took a backward step in the Championship, as the batting lineup largely struggled. A late win over Surrey in September, the side's first and only Championship win at Taunton all year, basically assured them of safety and Somerset ended up in 6th place. Somerset found much better success in the one-day formats, topping their group in the YB40, winning 8 out of their 12 games only to be bowled out for just 119 in the semi-final and lose by 8 wickets. Peter Trego was the tournament's leading run-scorer with 745 including 2 hundreds and 5 fifties in 12 innings. The now familiar pattern of success in the group stages and disappointment in the latter stages was repeated in the t20 as Somerset were knocked out in the quarter-finals by Surrey. Before the season Brian Rose's tenure as Director of Cricket ended and he was replaced by David Nosworthy.

Somerset had an indifferent 2014, as they failed to make much headway in the Championship and, for the first time since 2007, weren't able make the knockout stages of either one-day competition. Somerset again placed 6th in the Championship, although they were in no danger of relegation unlike the previous season. The beginning of the season had seen the departure of crowd favourite Buttler to Lancashire, and towards the end was marred by what turned out to be a career-ending eye injury to Kieswetter.

==== 2015 ====
Before the start of the 2015 season, plenty of changes took place at the club. Matthew Maynard stepped into the role of Director of Cricket after the club parted ways with Nosworthy. With the loss of Kieswetter, Somerset also lost another senior batsman in Compton as he moved back to London. Alfonso Thomas became captain in one-day competitions with Trescothick remaining as club and First-class captain. Somerset also made some new signings, including Chris Gayle for the start of the t20 Blast. For the most part, the season followed much the same path as the last, with Somerset failing to reach the latter stages of either limited overs competition and battling for the lower places in the Championship. Despite Gayle providing 328 runs in his three innings with the club, Somerset languished second from bottom in the t20 Blast. With Thomas sent out on loan, new signing Jim Allenby took over the captaincy for the One-Day Cup and despite winning their last three matches, Somerset missed out on a quarter-final spot. In the Championship, Somerset looked to be in relegation trouble for much of the season, but led by a late run of form from Trescothick and thanks to a maximum points victory in their final game, Somerset avoided the drop by a margin of 22 points and finished 6th in Division One for the third consecutive year. James Hildreth was the leading Championship run-scorer in Division One.

==== 2016 ====
The 2016 season saw dramatic improvements in two of the three competitions. Chris Rogers was brought in to captain the Championship side on a one-year basis, and having been mid-table for most of the season, Somerset went on a late surge which put them right in contention for the title going into the last round of matches. Somerset defeated Nottinghamshire in their match, with Rogers scoring tons in both innings of the last game of his career, but needed Middlesex and Yorkshire to draw their match on the final day. With the game drifting, Yorkshire employed declaration bowling in order to allow Middlesex to set a target. However, as the close neared, it became clear that Yorkshire were not going to reach the target and Middlesex appeared not to have quite enough time to bowl Yorkshire out. In heartbreaking fashion, Yorkshire's lower order collapsed to hand Middlesex the title and leave Somerset finishing runners-up. Somerset had four batsmen reach 1000 runs in the Championship, those being Trescothick, Hildreth, Rogers and for the first time in his career, Peter Trego. Spinner Jack Leach claimed 65 wickets, finishing second in the Division One wicket takers list. Somerset enjoyed a good run of success in the One-Day Cup too, reaching the semi-finals before losing to eventual champions Warwickshire. Captain Jim Allenby was the leading run-scorer, passing 50 in five of his ten innings in the competition. Lewis Gregory and Tim Groenewald both performed well enough to qualify for the South team for the inaugural North v South one-day series at the start of the next season. In stark contrast, Somerset's t20 Blast campaign was disastrous, the club finished bottom of the South Group and lost their last seven games in a row.

==== 2017 ====
Before the 2017 season, Somerset announced that at the age of 22, Tom Abell would be appointed as club and Championship captain. Somerset made a disastrous start to the Championship, losing four of their first six games of the season. Despite a victory in the seventh game against Yorkshire at Scarborough, Somerset's prospects of survival looked very poor indeed at the halfway mark of the season. A strong draw against Surrey was followed by victories against Warwickshire and Lancashire, and although Somerset lost their penultimate game against Surrey, their fate was still in their own hands. Somerset needed to beat Middlesex in the final match of the year at Taunton with one more bonus point than their opponents to assure safety. Thanks to a 9-wicket match haul from Jack Leach on a turning pitch, and a century from James Hildreth in the second innings, Somerset comfortably beat Middlesex by 231 runs to condemn last year's champions to relegation, and ensure their 10-year run in Division One would continue for another season. Leach finished with 51 wickets, while Craig Overton's 46 wickets were enough to see him called up for that winter's Ashes tour. As a mark of how the batting unit struggled, overseas player Dean Elgar was the only batsman to average over 36 with the bat, and Elgar was absent from the second half of the season. New signing Steven Davies was the leading run scorer with 775. Somerset again enjoyed good success in the One-Day Cup, winning five of seven completed matches and qualifying second in the South Group for a home quarter-final against Nottinghamshire. Somerset lost an incredible game in which 834 runs were scored, falling short of Nottinghamshire's 429/9 by 24 runs. Elgar also enjoyed great success in this competition, scoring 519 runs in the 6 games he played. Somerset were again involved in a thriller in the final round of games of the t20 Blast, where a 98-run victory against Hampshire saw them through to the quarter-finals by 0.07 on Net run rate for the first time since 2013. Somerset faced a difficult trip to Trent Bridge, and lost to Nottinghamshire by 5 wickets. At the end of the year it was announced that both one-day captain Jim Allenby and Director of Cricket Matthew Maynard would not be returning for 2018.

==== 2018 ====
Under new director of cricket Andy Hurry, who returned to the club, and new head coach Jason Kerr, Somerset enjoyed an excellent start to their 2018 Championship campaign, winning three of their first five matches whilst drawing the other two. However, a heavy innings defeat to Surrey in the next round proved to be pivotal, as Surrey would go on to run away with the Championship title winning 10 of their 14 matches. Nonetheless, Somerset themselves won 7 games and only lost twice, but were consigned to yet another runners-up finish. James Hildreth broke the 1000 run barrier, whilst Lewis Gregory and Craig Overton finished with 37 wickets each. Somerset struggled to find consistency in their One-Day Cup campaign, but nevertheless entered the final round of matches with a chance to qualify for a playoff. Despite winning their final game against eventual champions Hampshire, Essex secured the win they needed to reach the playoffs in place of Somerset. The 2018 season saw Somerset take a further step forward in their t20 cricket under new t20 captain Gregory, as they reached finals day for the first time in 6 years. Despite losing two of their first three games, Somerset ended up finishing top of the South Group, winning 10 of their 14 matches to earn a home quarter-final and a chance to exact revenge for the previous year on Nottinghamshire. They were able do so, winning by 19 runs on a reserve day due to the weather, sending them to finals day. There Somerset lost out to Sussex in the semi-final by 35 runs as Sussex were able to put a sizeable score of 202 on the board. The improved performance in the competition was in no small part due to the impact of overseas signings Corey Anderson, who was the team's leading run-scorer with 514 runs at a strike-rate of 169.1, and Jerome Taylor who claimed 22 wickets in his 11 matches. Jamie Overton was Somerset's leading wicket-taker with 24 in his 16 games.

==== 2019 ====
2019 was to prove to be the year Somerset finally broke their 14-year trophy drought, as they claimed victory in the 2019 Royal London One-Day Cup, to end a run of 10 runners-up finishes across all formats over a 10-year span. The campaign began in brilliant style as Somerset secured their largest-ever List A margin of victory by beating Kent by 264 runs in their opening match. Victories in their next three games including a win against Essex in the first-ever game played under the new permanent floodlights at the County Ground, meant at the halfway stage in the competition, qualification to the knockout stages seemed assured. However, defeats in their next three including a resounding loss to Hampshire, who chased a target of 216 in the 32nd over, left Somerset needing a win in their final game just to make it into an away play-off game. They were able to defeat Surrey by 5 wickets, setting up a play-off game against Worcestershire at New Road. A century from Tom Banton, and a five-wicket haul from overseas player Azhar Ali saw Somerset to a comfortable win by 147 runs. In the semi-final, Somerset once again faced Nottinghamshire in a knockout game, at Trent Bridge. Somerset posted exactly the same score of 337 as they had in the play-off match, and the total once again proved to be more than enough, as Nottinghamshire were bowled out for 222, meaning Somerset reached the Lord's final where they would face defending champions Hampshire. Hampshire won the toss and chose to bat but Somerset, thanks mainly to the opening spell of Josh Davey and eventual man-of-the-match Jamie Overton in the middle overs, were able to take wickets at regular intervals, and despite a ninth-wicket stand of 64, Hampshire's total of 244/8 looked to be short of what would be required. This proved to be even more the case when Banton and Azhar Ali put on an opening partnership of 112, and despite losing both in quick succession, Somerset always looked in control. Fittingly the winning runs were scored by James Hildreth, who had also hit the winning runs as a 20-year-old in Somerset's last trophy win in 2005.

==== 2020s ====
In spite of their one-day successes in 2023 and 2025 their first County Championship continues to elude them. Somerset followed their second place in both 2018 and 2019 with third place in 2024 and 2025. In 2026 they were confirmed as second again while racking up 731 against Surrey during the last match of the season with the highest score in the Championship that season and Somerset's second highest ever score.

2020

The 2020 season was severely curtailed due to the COVID-19 pandemic. The County Championshipwas abandoned, and a one-off compedition, the Bob Willis Trophy created, to commemorate the England fast bowler who had died the previous December. Teams were split into three regional groups of six teams, with Somerset in the Central Group, alongside Glamorgan, Gloucestershire, Northamptonshire, Warwickshire and Worcestershire, with the best two teams across the three groups playing off in a final at Lord's.

Somerset were soon in trouble in their opening match against Glamorgan at Taunton, reduced to 149 for 8 on the first afternoon. However, a superb effort from the tail saw them to 296, after which Somerset's Overton twins proved far too strong, bowling Glamorgan out for 131 and 166 to win by 289 runs. Tom Abell made a superb century in Somerset's second innings.

The Overton pairing also did for Northamptonshire in Somerset's second game. Somerset recovered from an indifferent 166 in their first innings to bowl Northants out for 67. Buoyed by a quickfire 68(43) from Jamie Overton, Northamptonshire were nowhere near their target of 322, bowled out for 154, with J. Overton taking 4/26.

Jamie was again to the fore in Somerset's unlucky draw with Warwickshire at Edgbaston. having bowled Warwickshire out for 121, Somerset made an imposing 413/9 declared, with Jamie Overton making his maiden first class century in what would prove to be his final game for the team. Rain and bad light thwarted Somerset's victory push, as Warwickshire finished 8 down, and still well short of making Somerset bat again.

Somerset made up for their disappointment by beating their West Country rivals Gloucestershire at Taunton. George Bartlett marshalled the tail to reach an unbeaten century, as Somerset put on 61 to reach 237, before bowling Gloucestershire out for 76. Tom Lammonby and Tom Abell both made centuries in Somerset's second innings 223/1 declared, before bowling Gloucestershire out for 70 to win by 314 runs. Craig Overton took a brilliant 9 for 51 in the match.

It was a closer affair at Worcester, as Somerset beat Worcestershire by 60 runs. On a pitch which offered assistance to the bowlers, Somerset's top order struggled again, but the tail wagged to take the Cidermen to 251 all out. Somerset took a lead of 51 into the second innings thanks to an excellent all-round bowling effort, before Tom Lammonby defied an increasingly tough pitch to make 107* in Somerset's 193. Set 245 to win, Worcestershire fought hard, but were ultimately undone by another collective bowling effort, bowled out for 184.

Somerset's victory would ultimately prove to make the difference between first and second in the group, taking them to a five-day final at Lord's with the possibility of Somerset winning a first-class trophy for the first time in their history. In rain-interrupted conditions at Lord's, Somerset, put into bat, made 301, thanks to Eddie Byrom's third first-class century. In wintry conditions, it became clear that a first-innings lead would be vital, as the rules of the competition stipulated that, if the match was drawn, the team ahead on first innings would take the trophy. After a battling bowling performance, Somerset had Essex 266 for 6, but battling performances from Adam Wheater and Jamie Porter saw them past Somerset's total. Somerset battled to 272 for 7, with Tom Lammonby again impressing with 116 to set Essex 237 to win. Essex struggled against tight bowling from Somerset, and were reduced to 131 for 5 with almost 30 overs to go. However, Ryan ten Doeschate and Adam Wheater dug in, and the teams shook hands with Somerset still four wickets short of victory.

It was a season where Somerset's bowlers excelled, as Craig Overton (30 at 13.4), Josh Davey (24 at 13.8), Lewis Gregory (18 at 17.7) and Jack Brooks (13 at 19.5). Somerset's batters found life more difficult, but there were strong performances from Tom Lammonby with 459 runs at 51.7, Tom Abell (386 at 58.2) and Somerset's player of the season Craig Overton (248 at 66.5).

Somerset's T20 Blast season came down to the final game. After four wins and four defeats in their first eight games, Somerset needed to beat Gloucestershire at Bristol in their final game to advance to Finals Day. Somerset needed to defend 13 in the final over, but three boundaries saw Gloucestershire across the line.

== Ground history ==
The Andrew Caddick Pavilion, named after the former England and Somerset fast bowler, was officially opened in 2015 as part of Somerset County Cricket Club's continued development of the Cooper Associates County Ground. The Pavilion serves as a central hub for players and support staff, featuring modern facilities, including player changing rooms, hospitality areas, and offices. This significant addition to the ground further enhanced the club's infrastructure, aligning with its vision to maintain a world-class cricketing venue.

In 2024, in a significant step toward sustainability, Somerset County Cricket Club partnered with local solar energy installer GB NRG to install a solar PV panel system on the roof of the Andrew Caddick Pavilion. The installation, designed to spell out "SCCC" with the panels, will cover a substantial portion of the club's energy needs, particularly during peak cricket seasons. This initiative is part of SCCC's commitment to reducing its carbon footprint, while also cutting operational costs, and serves as a model for how sports clubs can embrace renewable energy solutions.

== Players ==
=== Current squad ===
- No. denotes the player's squad number, as worn on the back of their shirt.
- ‡ denotes players with international caps.
- * denotes a player who has been awarded a county cap.

No.	Name	Nationality	Birth date	Batting style	Bowling style	Notes
Batters
10	Fin Hill	England	21 June 2006 (age 20)	Right-handed	Right-arm off break	
15	Tom Lammonby*	England	2 June 2000 (age 26)	Left-handed	Left-arm medium	
23	Will Smeed	England	26 October 2001 (age 25)	Right-handed	Right-arm off break	
28	Tom Abell*	England	5 March 1994 (age 32)	Right-handed	Right-arm medium	
32	Tom Kohler-Cadmore	England	19 August 1994 (age 32)	Right-handed	Right-arm off break	
—	Bertie Michael	England	6 April 2008 (age 18)	Left-handed	Right-arm leg break	
All-rounders
7	Craig Overton* ‡	England	10 April 1994 (age 32)	Right-handed	Right-arm fast-medium	
8	Josh Thomas	England	11 January 2005 (age 21)	Left-handed	Slow left-arm orthodox	
24	Lewis Gregory* ‡	England	24 May 1992 (age 34)	Right-handed	Right-arm fast-medium	Club captain
44	Lewis Goldsworthy	England	8 January 2001 (age 25)	Right-handed	Slow left-arm orthodox	
66	Archie Vaughan	England	9 December 2005 (age 20)	Right-handed	Right-arm off break	
Wicket-keepers
18	Tom Banton* ‡	England	11 November 1998 (age 28)	Right-handed	Right-arm off break	White ball contract; England central contract
45	Thomas Rew	England	29 November 2007 (age 18)	Right-handed	—	England development contract
55	James Rew* ‡	England	11 January 2004 (age 22)	Left-handed	Slow left-arm orthodox	
Bowlers
3	Alfie Ogborne	England	15 July 2003 (age 23)	Right-handed	Left-arm fast-medium	
5	Josh Shaw	England	3 January 1996 (age 30)	Right-handed	Right-arm fast-medium	
12	Riley Meredith ‡	Australia	21 June 1996 (age 30)	Right-handed	Right-arm fast	Overseas player (T20 only)
14	Jake Ball ‡	England	14 March 1991 (age 35)	Right-handed	Right-arm fast-medium	
17	Jack Leach* ‡	England	22 June 1991 (age 35)	Left-handed	Slow left-arm orthodox	
26	JT Langridge	England	3 November 2005 (age 21)	Left-handed	Left-arm fast-medium	
27	Migael Pretorius*	South Africa	24 March 1995 (age 31)	Right-handed	Right-arm fast-medium	Overseas player
93	James Theedom	England	5 March 2007 (age 19)	Left-handed	Right-arm medium	
Source: Updated: 6 November 2026

== Club officials ==
=== Committee ===
- President: Peter Wanless
- Chairman: Richard Brice (interim)
- Honorary Treasurer: Nick Farrant
- Chief Executive: Jamie Cox
- Directors: Rhys Beer, Hannah Buckley, Donna Eavis, Vic Marks, Annabel Timmins
- Members Directors: Richard Brice, Richard Hatcher, Geoff Vian
- Somerset Cricket Foundation Representative: Dr Habib Naqvi

=== Coaching staff ===
- Director of Cricket: Andrew Hurry
- Head coach: Jason Kerr
- Second XI head coach and assistant coach: Paul Tweddle
- Batting and assistant coach: Mark Stoneman
- Bowling and assistant coach: Steve Kirby
- Clinical director: Jamie Thorpe

=== Administration and coaching history ===
==== Presidents ====
Those who have held the office of Somerset President are:

Dates	Name
1891–1915	Hon. Sir Spencer Ponsonby-Fane
1916–1922	H.E. Murray Anderdon
1923	Arthur Newton
1924	The Marquis of Bath
1925	Lt-Col. Sir Dennis F. Boles
1926	Col. H.M. Ridley
1927	Rev. Archie Wickham
1928	Col. H.M. Ridley
1929	Lionel Palairet
1930	Vernon Hill
1931–1932	Major A.G. Barrett
1933	Lt-Col. W.O. Gibbs
1934–1935	Lt-Col. Sir Dennis F. Boles
1936	The Duke of Somerset
1937–1946	Richard Palairet
1946–1949	John Daniell
1950–1953	Major G.E. Longrigg
1954–1960	The Bishop of Bath & Wells
1961	Jack White
1962–1965	Bill Greswell
1966–1967	Lord Hylton
1968–1971	Bunty Longrigg
1971–1976	R.V. Showering
1976–1991	Colin Atkinson
1991–1996	J. Luff
1996–2003	Michael Hill
2004–2015	Roy Kerslake
2016–2018	Richard Parsons
2019–2022	Brian Rose
2022–present	Peter Wanless

== See also ==
- List of Somerset first-class cricket records
- List of Somerset List A cricket records
- List of Somerset Twenty20 cricket records

== Bibliography ==
- Foot, David (1986). Sunshine, Sixes and Cider: The History of Somerset Cricket (1986 ed.). David & Charles. ISBN 0-7153-8890-8.
- Swanton, E.W., ed. (1986). Barclays World of Cricket (1986 ed.). Book Club Associates. ISBN 0-00-218193-2.
- Terry, David (May 2000). "The Seventeenth Century Game of Cricket: A Reconstruction of the Game" (PDF). The Sports Historian. 20 (1). The British Society of Sports History: 33–43. doi:10.1080/17460260009445828. S2CID 144800200. Archived from the original (PDF) on 21 June 2009.
