= Ian Botham =

English cricketer (born 1955)

The Right Honourable The Lord Botham OBE
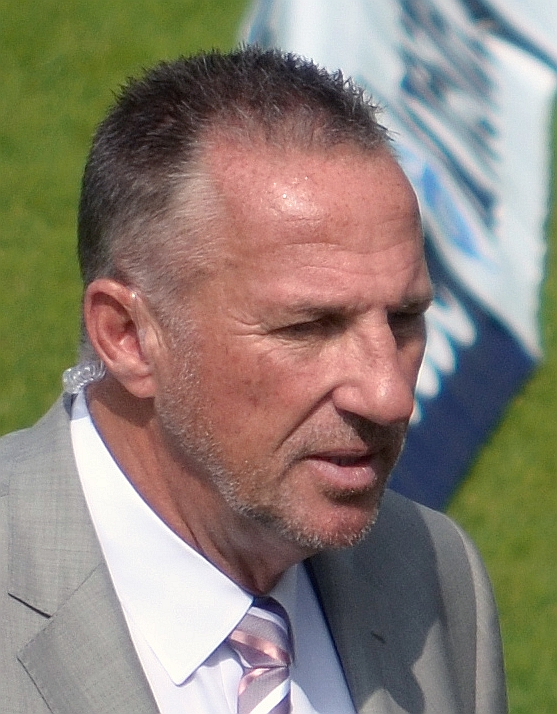
- Botham in 2013

Member of the House of Lords
- Lord Temporal
- Life peerage 10 September 2020

Personal details
- Born: 24 November 1955 (age 70) Heswall, Cheshire, England
- Cricket career

Personal information
- Full name: Ian Terence Botham
- Nickname: Both, Beefy, Guy
- Height: 6 ft 2 in (188 cm)
- Batting: Right-handed
- Bowling: Right-arm fast-medium
- Role: All-rounder

International information
- National side: England (1976–1992)
- Test debut (cap 474): 28 July 1977 v Australia
- Last Test: 18 June 1992 v Pakistan
- ODI debut (cap 33): 26 August 1976 v West Indies
- Last ODI: 24 August 1992 v Pakistan

Domestic team information
- Years: Team
- 1974–1986: Somerset
- 1987/88: Queensland
- 1987–1991: Worcestershire
- 1992–1993: Durham

Career statistics
Competition	Tests	ODI	FC	LA
Matches	102	116	402	470
Runs scored	5,200	2,113	19,399	10,474
Batting average	33.54	23.21	33.97	29.50
100s/50s	14/22	0/9	38/97	7/46
Top score	208	79	228	175*
Balls bowled	21,815	6,271	63,547	22,899
Wickets	383	145	1,172	612
Bowling average	28.40	28.54	27.22	24.94
5 wickets in innings	27	0	59	3
10 wickets in match	4	0	8	0
Best bowling	8/34	4/31	8/34	5/27
Catches/stumpings	120/–	36/–	354/–	196/–
Medal record
Men's Cricket
Representing England
ICC Cricket World Cup
Runner-up	1979 England
Runner-up	1992 Australia and New Zealand
- Source: CricketArchive, 22 August 2007
Association football career
- Position: Centre half
Senior career*
Years	Team	Apps	(Gls)
1978–1980	Yeovil Town	17	(1)
1980–1985	Scunthorpe United	11	(0)
- * Club domestic league appearances and goals

Ian Terence Botham, Baron Botham (born 24 November 1955) is an English former cricketer, cricket commentator, charity fundraiser and member of the House of Lords. He has been chairman of Durham County Cricket Club since 2017. An all-rounder, Botham represented England in both Test and One-Day International cricket. He was part of the England squads that finished as runners-up at the 1979 and 1992 Cricket World Cups.

Botham played most of his first-class cricket for Somerset, having also played for Worcestershire, Durham and Queensland. He was an aggressive right-handed batsman and a right-arm fast-medium bowler known for his swing bowling. He generally fielded close to the wicket, predominantly in the slips. In Test cricket, Botham scored 14 centuries with a highest score of 208, and from 1986 to 1988 held the world record for the most Test wickets until overtaken by Sir Richard Hadlee. He took 27 five-wicket hauls and four ten-wicket hauls. In 1980, he became the second player in Test history to complete the "match double" of scoring 100 runs and taking 10 wickets in the same match. In 2018, he was named in the country's greatest Test XI by the ECB.

Botham has raised money for research into childhood leukaemia, including over 13 million pounds for Bloodwise, of which he became president. On 8 August 2009, he was inducted into the ICC Cricket Hall of Fame. In July 2020, it was announced that Botham would be elevated to the House of Lords and that he would sit as a crossbench peer.

Botham was a talented footballer at school and had to choose between cricket and football as a career. He made eleven appearances in the Football League for Scunthorpe United, becoming the club's president in 2017. He has been awarded a knighthood and a life peerage.

== Early life and development as a cricketer (1955–1973) ==
Ian Botham was born in Heswall, Cheshire, to Herbert Leslie ("Les") Botham and Violet Marie, née Collett. His father had been in the Fleet Air Arm for twenty years spanning the Second World War; his mother was a nurse. The family moved to Yeovil before Botham's third birthday after his father got a job as a test engineer at Westland Helicopters. Both his parents played cricket: his father for Westland Sports Club while his mother captained a nursing services team at Sherborne. Botham developed an eagerness for the game before he had started school: he would climb through the fence of the Yeovil Boys' Grammar School to watch the pupils play cricket. At the age of around four, he came home with a cricket ball and asked his mother "Do you know how to hold a ball when you're going to bowl a daisy-cutter?" He subsequently demonstrated the grip and went away to practise bowling it.

Botham attended Milford Junior School in the town, and his "love affair" with sport began there. He played both cricket and football for the school's teams at the age of nine, two years earlier than most of his contemporaries. Playing against the older boys forced Botham to learn to hit the ball hard, and improve to their standard. At the same age he went to matches with his father, who played for Westland Sports Club, and if one of the teams was short, he would try to get a match. His father recalled that though he never got to bowl, and rarely got to bat, he received praise for the standard of his fielding. He joined the Boys' Brigade where more sporting opportunities were available. By the time he was nine, he had begun to "haunt" local recreation grounds with his kit always ready, looking to play for any team that was short of players. By the age of twelve he was playing occasional matches for Yeovil Cricket Club's second team.

Botham went on to Bucklers Mead Comprehensive School in Yeovil, where he continued to do well in sport and played for the school's cricket and football teams. He became captain of their under-16 cricket team when he was thirteen. His performances for the school drew the attention of Somerset County Cricket Club's youth coach Bill Andrews. Still thirteen, he scored 80 runs on debut for Somerset's under-15s team against Wiltshire, but the team captain Phil Slocombe did not call on him to bowl as he considered him to be a specialist batsman. Two years later, Botham had the opportunity to choose between football and cricket: Bert Head, manager of Crystal Palace offered him apprentice forms with the First Division club. He already had a contract with Somerset and, after discussing the offer with his father, decided to continue to pursue a cricket career, as he believed he was a better cricketer. When informed that he wanted to be a sportsman, Botham's careers teacher said to him: "Fine, everyone wants to play sport, but what are you really going to do?"

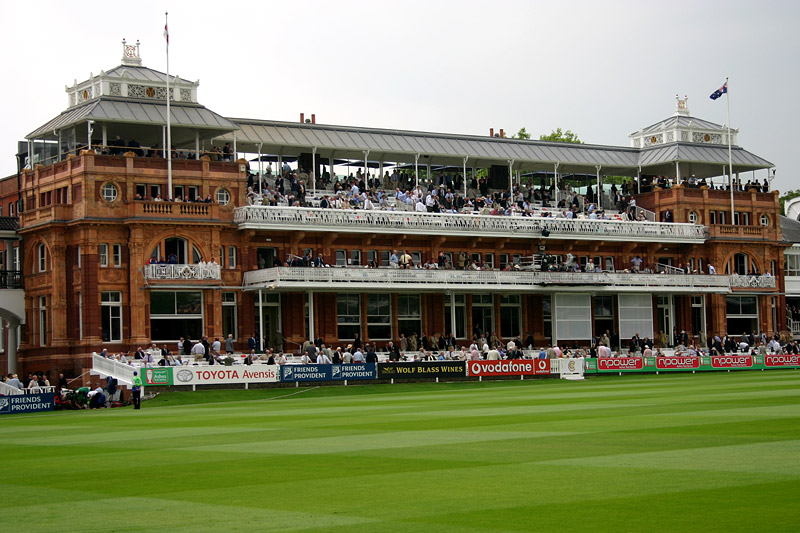
The pavilion at Lord's Cricket Ground, where Botham served as a ground boy in 1972 and 1973

In 1972, at the age of 16, Botham left school intent on playing cricket for Somerset, who retained his contract but felt he was too young to justify a full professional deal. So, Botham joined the ground staff at Lord's. As a ground boy, he had numerous tasks such as "cleaning the pavilion windows, pushing the roller on matchdays, selling scorecards, pressing electronic buttons on the scoreboards and rushing bowling analyses to the dressing-room". He also received coaching and plenty of time in the practice nets, and was often the first to arrive and the last to leave practice. Despite his time in the nets, Botham was only considered by Marylebone Cricket Club (MCC) coach Harry Sharp to have the potential to become a "good, average county cricketer." Botham travelled to play for Somerset under-25s a number of times during the season, but failed to excel in any of the matches. His appearances for the MCC were of a similar vein: he rarely scored more than 50 runs, and was used sparingly as a bowler. In one such match against "Scotland A", the MCC Young Cricketers used eight bowlers in their second innings, but Botham was not among them.

The following year, still a ground boy at Lord's, Botham was asked to return to play for Somerset's under-25s more often. Against Glamorgan U-25, he scored 91 runs and took three tail-end wickets, while just under a month later he claimed a further three wickets against Hampshire. He advanced to play for the county's second team in the Minor Counties Championship, and although he was still used sparingly as a bowler, he made some good scores with the bat, most significantly against Cornwall, against whom he aggregated 194 runs in four innings. During winter nets prior to the season, Botham had caught the eye of the former England Test cricketer Tom Cartwright, who coached at Millfield School in addition to playing for Somerset. Cartwright was impressed with Botham's foot-work and physical co-ordination, and helped him learn the basics of swing bowling, something Botham picked up "astonishingly quickly" according to Cartwright.

== Cricket career (1973–1993) ==
=== Somerset (1973–1975) ===
Botham had done well for the Second XI and he later acknowledged the help and advice he received from Somerset players Peter Robinson, Graham Burgess and Ken Palmer. Botham made his senior debut, aged 17, for Somerset on Sunday, 2 September 1973 when he played in a List A John Player League (JPL) match (38 overs each) against Sussex at the County Ground, Hove. The match was in the same week that his time on the Lord's ground staff was completed. Somerset batted first, and Botham, number seven in the batting order, scored two runs before he was dismissed leg before wicket (lbw) by Mike Buss. Somerset totalled 139 for 9. Sussex won comfortably by six wickets, reaching 141 for four with fifteen deliveries remaining. Botham bowled three overs without success, conceding 22 runs. He did impress, however, by taking a diving catch to dismiss his future England colleague Tony Greig off the bowling of his captain Brian Close.

A week later, Botham made a second appearance in the JPL against Surrey at The Oval in the final match of the season. Somerset were well beaten by 68 runs. Botham had his first bowling success when he dismissed Geoff Howarth lbw. He bowled four overs and took one for 14. As in his first match, he scored two batting at number seven, this time being caught and bowled by Intikhab Alam. These were his only two senior appearances in 1973, Somerset finishing 11th in the JPL. In summary, Botham scored four runs, took one wicket for 14 and held one catch.

Aged 18, Botham was a regular in the Somerset team from the beginning of the 1974 season and made his first-class début 8–10 May in a County Championship match against Lancashire at the County Ground, Taunton. Viv Richards, from Antigua and Barbuda, made his County Championship début for Somerset in the same match and Lancashire's team included Clive Lloyd, two players who would loom large in Botham's future Test career. Brian Close won the toss and decided to bat first. On day one, Somerset were all out for 285 and Lancashire reached 41 for none. Botham batted at number seven and scored 13 before being caught. Day two was rain-affected and Lancashire advanced to 200 for none. Their innings closed on the final day at 381 for eight. Botham bowled only three overs and his figures were none for 15; he held one catch to dismiss Jack Simmons. Somerset played for the draw and were 104 for two at the end. Botham did not bat again.

On 12 June 1974, he played against Hampshire at Taunton in a Benson & Hedges Cup (B&H Cup) quarter-final. Hampshire won the toss and decided to bat. They scored 182 all out with Botham taking two for 33 including the prize wicket of Barry Richards, bowled for 13. Botham was number nine in Somerset's batting order and came in with his team struggling at 113 for 7. Almost immediately, that became 113 for 8 and he had only the tailenders Hallam Moseley and Bob Clapp to support him. He was facing the West Indian fast bowler Andy Roberts who delivered a bouncer which hit him in the mouth. Despite heavy bleeding and the eventual loss of four teeth, Botham refused to leave the field and carried on batting. He hit two sixes and made 45*, enabling Somerset to win by one wicket. He won the Gold Award. Later, he said he should have left the field but was full of praise for Moseley and Clapp.

In a County Championship match on 13 July 1974, Botham scored his first half-century in first-class cricket. He made 59 in Somerset's first innings against Middlesex at Taunton, the highest individual score in a low-scoring match which Somerset won by 73 runs. Middlesex's captain was Mike Brearley, who would become a very influential figure in Botham's career. A month later, in a match against Leicestershire at Clarence Park, Weston-super-Mare, Botham achieved his first-ever five wickets in an innings (5wI) with five for 59. He took seven in the match which Somerset won by 179 runs, largely thanks to Close who scored 59 and 114*.

Botham showed great promise in 1974, his first full season in which Somerset finished fifth in the County Championship and a close second to Leicestershire in the JPL. They also reached the semi-finals in both the Gillette Cup and the B&H Cup. In 18 first-class appearances, Botham scored 441 runs with a highest of 59, took 30 first-class wickets with a best of five for 59 and held 15 catches. He played in 18 List A matches too, scoring 222 runs with a highest of 45* (his Gold Award innings against Hampshire), took 12 wickets with a best of two for 16 and held four catches.

Botham continued to make progress in 1975. Somerset struggled in the County Championship, winning only four of their twenty matches and finished joint 12th. In the JPL, they slumped badly from second to 14th. They reached the quarter-final of the B&H Cup but only the second round of the Gillette Cup. Botham played in 22 first-class and 23 List A matches so it was a busy season for him. In first-class, he scored 584 runs with a highest of 65, one of two half-centuries, and held 18 catches. He took 62 wickets, doubling his 1974 tally, with a best of five for 69, his only 5wI that season. In List A, he scored 232 runs with a highest of 38* and held seven catches. He took 32 wickets with a best of three for 34.

=== Somerset and England (1976) ===
1976 was a significant season for Botham as he scored over 1,000 runs for the first time, completed his first century and earned international selection by England in two Limited Overs Internationals. Somerset improved in the County Championship to finish seventh, winning seven matches. They were one of five teams tied for first place in the JPL but their run rate was less than that of Kent, who were declared the champions. Somerset lost their opening match in the Gillette Cup and were eliminated at the group stage of the B&H Cup. Botham, though, came on in leaps and bounds. He totalled 1,022 first-class runs in 20 matches with a highest of 167*, his first-ever century and he also scored six half-centuries. With the ball, he took 66 wickets with a best of six for 16. He had four 5wI and, for the first time, ten wickets in a match (10wM). He played in a total of 22 List A matches, including the two for England, scoring 395 runs with a highest of 46. He took 33 wickets with a best of four for 41.

In the County Championship match against Sussex at Hove in May, Botham came very close to his maiden century but was dismissed for 97, his highest score to date. The match was drawn. At the end of the month, Somerset played Gloucestershire in a remarkable match at Taunton. Batting first, Somerset scored 333 for seven (innings closed) and then, thanks to six for 25 by Botham, bowled out Gloucestershire for only 79. The follow-on was enforced but Gloucestershire proved a much tougher nut to crack second time around. With Zaheer Abbas scoring 141, they made 372 and left Somerset needing 118 to win. Botham took five for 125 in the second innings for a match analysis of 11 for 150, his maiden 10wM. This match ended the same way as the famous Test at Headingley in 1981 but the boot was on the other foot for Botham here because he was on the team that enforced the follow-on – and lost. Mike Procter and Tony Brown did the damage and bowled Somerset out for 110 in 42 overs, Gloucestershire winning by just eight runs.

Botham scored his maiden first-class century at Trent Bridge on Tuesday 3 August 1976 in the County Championship game against Nottinghamshire (Notts) who won the toss and decided to bat first. Derek Randall scored 204* and the Notts innings closed at 364 for 4 (Botham one for 59). Somerset were 52 for one at close of play. On day two, Somerset scored 304 for 8 (innings closed) and Botham, batting at number six, scored 80. At close of play, Notts in their second innings were 107 for four, thus extending their lead to 167 with six wickets standing. On day three, Notts advanced to 240 for nine declared (Botham one for 16), leaving Somerset with a difficult target of 301. At 40 for two and with both their openers gone, Brian Close changed his batting order and summoned Botham to come in at number four. Close himself had gone in at three but he was out soon afterwards for 35. With support from Graham Burgess (78), Botham laid into the Notts bowling and scored an impressive 167 not out. Somerset reached 302 for four in only 65 overs and won by six wickets.

Botham's international début for England was on 26 August 1976 in a Limited Overs International (LOI) against the West Indies at the North Marine Road Ground, Scarborough. The series was called the Prudential Trophy and the teams had 55 overs each per innings. Botham, still only 20, was the youngest player. At Scarborough, England captain Alan Knott lost the toss and Clive Lloyd, captaining the West Indies, elected to field first. Botham was number seven in the batting order and came in at 136 for five to join Graham Barlow. He scored only one before he was caught by Roy Fredericks off the bowling of his future Sky Sports colleague Michael Holding. England's innings closed at 202 for eight with Barlow 80 not out. West Indies lost Fredericks almost immediately but that brought Viv Richards to the crease and he hit 119 not out, winning the man of the match award, and leading West Indies to victory in only 41 overs by six wickets. Botham had the consolation of taking his first international wicket when he had Lawrence Rowe caught by Mike Hendrick for 10. He bowled only three overs and took some punishment from Richards, his return being one for 26.

In the second match at Lord's, Botham was replaced by returning England captain Tony Greig. England lost by 36 runs as Richards, this time with 97, was again the difference between the teams. Having lost the series, England recalled Botham for the final match at Edgbaston on 30–31 August. The match was extended to two days and overs reduced to 32 per side. Tony Greig won the toss and decided to field. England began well and dismissed Fredericks and Richards, for a duck, in only the second over. West Indies were then seven for one but a powerful innings by Clive Lloyd pulled them out of trouble and they reached 223 for nine, innings closed. Botham bowled three very expensive overs, conceding 31 runs, but he did manage to bowl out Michael Holding for his second international wicket. England were never in the hunt and were bowled out for 173, West Indies winning by 50 runs and claiming the series 3–0. Botham again batted at number seven and made a good start, scoring 20 at a run a ball, but he was then caught by Bernard Julien off Fredericks and England were 151 for seven with only Knott and the tailenders left.

=== District cricket in Australia (1976–77) ===
In the winter of 1976–77, after he had made his first two international appearances, Botham played District Cricket in Melbourne, Australia for the Melbourne University Cricket Club. He was joined by Yorkshire's Graham Stevenson. They were signed for the second half of the season on a sponsorship arranged through the Test and County Cricket Board (TCCB) by Whitbread's Brewery. Five of the competition's 15 rounds were abandoned because of adverse weather. It was apparently on this trip that Botham originally fell out with the former Australian captain Ian Chappell. The cause seems to have been a cricket-related argument in a bar, which may have resulted in Chappell being pushed off his stool (the story is widely sourced but accounts differ). This became a long-running feud and, as late as the 2010–11 Ashes series, there was an altercation between Botham and Chappell in a car park at the Adelaide Oval.

=== Somerset and England (1977) ===
Botham produced a number of good batting and bowling performances for Somerset in 1977 and these impressed the Test selectors who included him in the team for the third Test against Australia at Trent Bridge, starting on 28 July. Having captured 36 first-class wickets through May and June, Botham had something of a purple patch in July which earned him his Test call-up. In the match against Sussex at Hove, which Somerset won by an innings and 37 runs, he took four for 111 and six for 50 for his second 10wM. In Somerset's innings of 448 for eight, he shared a 4th wicket partnership of 174 with Viv Richards. Botham scored 62, Richards 204. He took 22 more wickets, including two 5wI, in the next three County Championship games before his Test debut. In the whole season, playing 17 first-class matches, he took 88 wickets with six 5wI and one 10wM, his second innings return at Hove being his best. His batting was not quite as good as in 1976 as his average was down but he scored 738 runs with a highest of 114, which was his sole century, and five half-centuries. He scored the century in July against Hampshire at Taunton, 114 in Somerset's first innings of 284, and followed it with bowling returns of four for 69 and four for 43, another impressive all-round effort which earned Somerset a win by 152 runs. Somerset had a good season in the County Championship, finishing fourth. They reached the semi-final of the Gillette Cup but, without the injured Botham, were well beaten by eventual winners Middlesex. They were a poor tenth in the JPL and were eliminated from the B&H Cup at the group stage.

Botham made his Test début at Trent Bridge on 28 July 1977 in the third Test against Australia. His début was somewhat overshadowed by the return from self-imposed Test exile of Geoffrey Boycott. England went into the match with a 1–0 series lead having won the second Test after the first had been drawn. The series was played against the background of the so-called "Packer Affair" which resulted in the establishment of World Series Cricket in the next Australian season. Because of Tony Greig's involvement, he had been stripped of the England captaincy but remained in the team under new captain Mike Brearley. England had three all-rounders at Trent Bridge with Greig, Geoff Miller and Botham all playing. Australian captain Greg Chappell won the toss and decided to bat first. Australia scored 243 and were all out shortly before the close on day one. Botham, aged 21, made an immediate impact and took five for 74, the highlight being the dismissal of Chappell, his first test match wicket, bowled for just 19. England batted all through day two and into day three as Boycott, in his first Test innings since 1974, and Knott both made centuries. Botham came in at number eight on day three and scored 25 before he was bowled by Max Walker. England were all out not long afterwards for 364, a first innings lead of 121. Botham had no joy in Australia's second innings with none for 60. A century by Rick McCosker enabled Australia to score 309 before they were all out in the evening session on day four. Bob Willis took five for 88. England needed 189 to win and completed the job, by seven wickets, well into the final day with Brearley scoring 81 and Boycott, who batted on all five days, 80 not out. Botham didn't get a second innings.

Botham's impressive bowling at Trent Bridge meant he was an automatic choice for the fourth Test at Headingley two weeks later. England won the toss, decided to bat first and went on to win by an innings and 85 runs to secure a winning 3–0 lead in the series and regain The Ashes, which they had lost in 1974–75. The match is famous for Boycott's one hundredth career century, scored on his home county ground and in his second Test since his return to the England fold. Botham was bowled third ball by Ray Bright without scoring. He made amends with the ball by taking five for 21 in only eleven overs, Australia being bowled out for only 103. The follow-on was enforced and Australia this time made 248, but Botham (none for 47) did not take a wicket. He was injured during the second innings when he accidentally trod on the ball and broke a bone in his foot. He was unable to play again in the 1977 season.

His promising start as Test player resulted in two awards. He was named Young Cricketer of the Year for 1977 by the Cricket Writers' Club; and was selected as one of the Wisden Cricketers of the Year (i.e., for 1977 but announced in the 1978 edition). Wisden commented that his 1977 season "was marred only by a week's cricket idleness carrying the drinks at the Prudential matches, and a foot injury which ruined for him the end of the season and probably robbed him of a rare double. He finished with 88 wickets and 738 runs". Importantly, the foot injury was a broken toe sustained when he trod on the ball at Headingley and Botham subsequently needed treatment for it at his local hospital in Taunton. It was while going to one of his appointments that he took a wrong turn and ended up on a children's ward where he learned that some of the children were dying of leukaemia. This incident sparked his charitable crusade on behalf of leukaemia research.

=== Somerset and England (1977–78 to 1979–80) ===
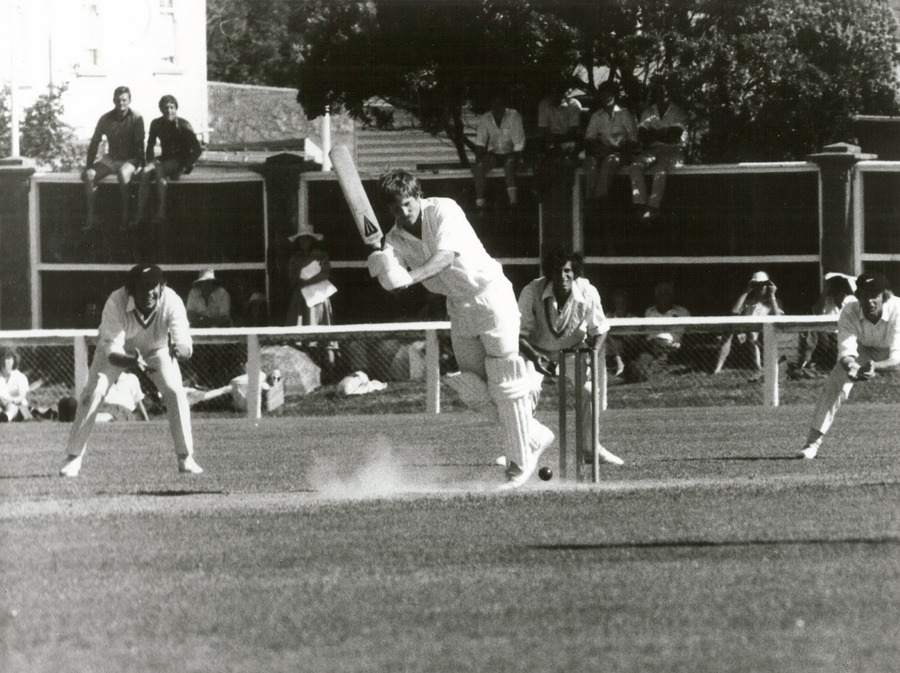
Ian Botham vs NZ, Basin Reserve February 1978

England were in Pakistan from November 1977 to January 1978, playing three Tests and three LOIs. Botham was almost fully recovered from his foot injury but did not play in any of the Tests. He took part in all three LOIs and in some of the first-class matches against club teams. From January to March, England were in New Zealand for a three-match Test series under the captaincy of Geoff Boycott. Botham impressed in a first-class match against Canterbury at Lancaster Park, scoring 126 not out in the second innings against an attack including Richard Hadlee and was selected for the first Test at Basin Reserve. Botham had an indifferent game there and England, twice bowled out by Hadlee, lost by 72 runs. In the next match at Carisbrook against Otago, Botham achieved a 10wM with seven for 58 (his career best return to date) in the second innings, enabling the England XI to win by six wickets.

England won the second Test at Lancaster Park by 174 runs after an outstanding all-round performance by Botham who scored 103 and 30 not out and took five for 73 and three for 38. He also held three catches. In the second innings, promoted up the order to get quick runs before an overnight declaration, he was responsible for calling for a risky run that led to the run-out dismissal of acting-captain Geoff Boycott: Botham's own published autobiography alleges that this was deliberately done, on the orders of acting vice-captain Bob Willis, because Boycott was scoring too slowly. The final Test was played at Eden Park and was drawn, the series ending 1–1. New Zealand batted first and totalled 315 with Geoff Howarth scoring 122. Botham took five for 109 in 34 overs. England replied with 429 all out (Clive Radley 158, Botham 53). New Zealand then chose to bat out time and Howarth scored his second century of the match (Botham none for 51). Botham's form in New Zealand cemented his place in the England team.

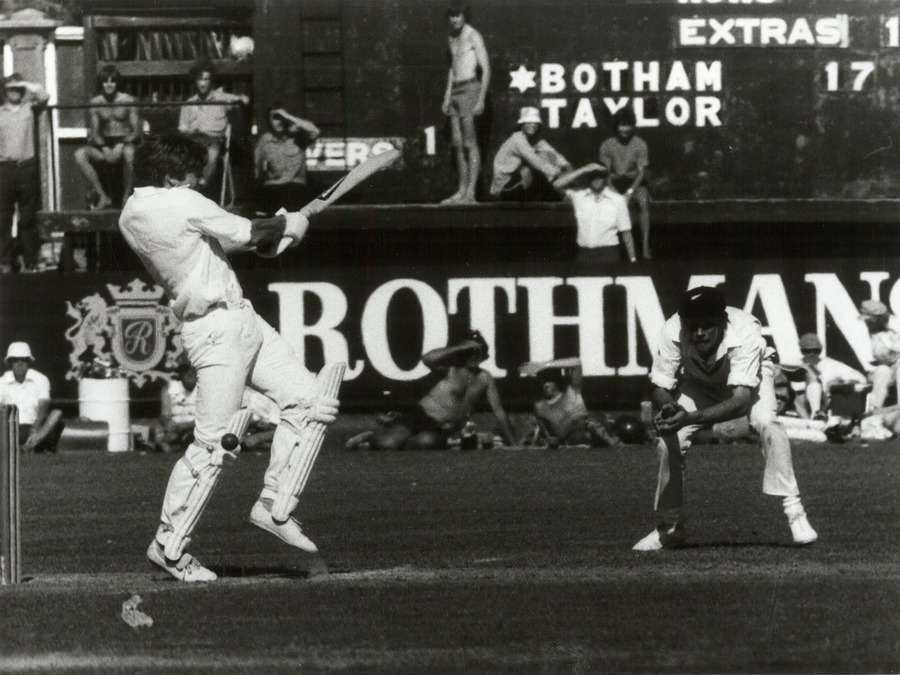
Ian Botham vs NZ, Basin Reserve February 1978

In the 1978 English season, Pakistan and New Zealand both visited to play three Tests each and Botham featured in all six matches. Having scored exactly 100 in the first Test against Pakistan at Edgbaston, England winning by an innings and 57 runs, Botham in the second at Lord's scored 108 and then, after none for 17 in the first innings, achieved his Test and first-class career best return of eight for 34 in the second, England winning by an innings and 120 runs. The third Test was ruined by the weather and England won the series 2–0. Against New Zealand, Botham did little with the bat but his bowling was outstanding. In the second Test he took nine wickets in the match as England won by an innings and then a 10wM in the final match at Lord's with six for 101 and five for 39. England won the series 3–0.

Due to his England commitments, Botham appeared infrequently for Somerset in 1978. His best performances for them were a return of seven for 61 against Glamorgan and an innings of 80 against Sussex in the Gillette Cup final at Lord's. This was Somerset's first limited overs final and they lost by five wickets despite Botham's effort. They were involved in a tight contest for the JPL title and were placed second on run rate after tying with Hampshire and Leicestershire on 48 points each. Somerset did quite well in the County Championship, finishing fifth after winning nine matches, and reached the semi-final of the B&H Cup.

Botham's first tour of Australia was in 1978–79. England, defending the Ashes they had regained in 1977, played six Tests under Mike Brearley's leadership. Australia had what was effectively "a reserve team" because their leading players were contracted to World Series Cricket for the season. The difference in standard was evident on the first day of the first Test at the Gabba as Botham, Chris Old and Bob Willis bowled them out for only 116 in just 38 overs, England going on to win easily enough by seven wickets. Apart from a surprise defeat in the third Test, England were never troubled and won the series 5–1. Botham's performance in the series was satisfactory but there were no headlines and only modest averages. He took 23 wickets at 24.65 with a best return of four for 42. He scored 291 runs with a highest of 74 at 29.10. He held 11 catches.

Botham played for England in the 1979 Cricket World Cup and was a member of their losing team in the final. He was again an infrequent member of the Somerset team because of the World Cup and the Test series against India. It became a memorable season for Somerset as they built on their form in 1978 to win both the Gillette Cup and the JPL, their first-ever senior trophies. Botham played in the Gillette Cup final at Lord's, in which they defeated Northamptonshire by 45 runs, thanks to a century by Viv Richards. They slipped to eighth in the County Championship. In the B&H Cup, however, they were expelled from the competition for bringing the game into disrepute after an unsporting declaration, designed to protect the team's run rate, by team captain Brian Rose.

The England v India series in 1979 took place after the World Cup ended and four Tests were played. England won the first at Edgbaston by an innings and 83 runs after opening with a massive total of 633 for five declared. Botham scored 33 and then took two for 86 and five for 70. On the first day of the second Test at Lord's, Botham swept through the Indian batting with five for 35 and a catch off Mike Hendrick to dismiss them for only 96 in 56 overs. Surprisingly, however, India recovered to salvage a draw. In the third Test at Headingley, it was Botham the batsman who did the business, scoring 137 from 152 balls in England's first innings total of 270 (the next highest innings was 31 by Geoff Boycott). The match was ruined by the weather and was drawn. In the final Test at The Oval, England opened with 305 (Botham 38); India replied with 202 (Botham four for 65); and England, with 334 for eight declared (Botham run out for a duck), extended their lead to 437 with four sessions remaining. Thanks to a brilliant 221 by Sunil Gavaskar, India came agonisingly close to pulling off a remarkable last day victory but ran out of time on 429 for eight (Botham three for 97), just nine runs short, and so England won the series 1–0 with three draws.

The shambolic state of international cricket at the end of the 1970s was illustrated by the panic resulting from a hastily convened settlement between World Series Cricket and the Australian Board of Control. Although they had visited Australia only twelve months earlier to play for the Ashes, England were persuaded to go there again and play another three Tests, but with the Ashes not at stake. As Wisden put it, the programme did not have the best interests of cricket at heart, particularly Australian cricket below Test level, which had been "swamped by the accent on Test and one-day internationals, neatly parcelled to present a cricketing package suitable for maximum exploitation on television".

The matches were widely perceived to be semi-official only and received "a definite thumbs down". Botham was a member of the England team and played in all three matches which nevertheless count towards his Test statistics. England were largely faithful to the players who had toured Australia the previous winter and Derek Underwood was the only World Series player they recalled; they did not recall Alan Knott, for example, while Tony Greig was beyond the pale. Australia recalled Greg Chappell, Dennis Lillee, Rod Marsh and Jeff Thomson, fielding a team that was a mixture of old and new. In the first match, played at the WACA Ground, Botham had match figures of eleven for 176 but to no avail as Australia won by 138 runs. Having excelled with the ball in that match, Botham did so with his bat in the third one, scoring an unbeaten 119 in the second innings of the third. Australia won all three matches of a series best forgotten for all its attendant politics, but Botham had enhanced his reputation as a world-class all-rounder.

=== Jubilee Test, India, February 1980 ===
Botham's third overseas tour was to India in February 1980. It was the fiftieth anniversary of India's entry into Test cricket and so England played a single commemorative Test at the Wankhede Stadium in Bombay. It turned into a personal triumph for Botham who became the first player in Test history to score a century and take ten wickets in the same match. England's wicketkeeper Bob Taylor held ten catches in the match, eight of them off Botham's bowling.

India won the toss and decided to bat first but, with Botham taking six for 58, they were all out on day one for 242. England replied with 296, the highlight being Botham's 114 from just 144 balls; he began his innings with England in trouble at 57 for four. This quickly became 58 for five and Botham was joined by England's other match hero Taylor. England's first five batsmen had contributed just 51 to the total. Botham was often unfairly labelled a "big hitter" but in fact his style was very orthodox (i.e., he "played straight") and in this innings he scored 17 fours but, significantly, no sixes. Taylor provided dogged support and their sixth wicket partnership realised 171 runs. When Botham was out near the end of day two, the score was 229 for six and England reached 232 for six at close of play, still ten runs behind. On the third morning, Taylor led England past India's total and, with useful batting performances by the specialist bowlers, England totalled 296 to gain a first innings lead of 54.

India's second innings was a disaster, and they lost eight wickets by the close of play on the third day with only Kapil Dev offering any resistance. They were all out early on the fourth day for 149. Botham was the outstanding performer again, taking seven for 48 which gave him match figures of thirteen for 106. Geoffrey Boycott and Graham Gooch scored the necessary runs for England to win by ten wickets with a day to spare.

=== Somerset and England (1980 to 1980–81) ===
Mike Brearley announced his retirement from Test cricket after the Jubilee Test in Bombay and, somewhat surprisingly given his lack of captaincy experience, Botham was appointed to replace him as England's captain for the forthcoming home series against West Indies, who were at the time the world's outstanding team. Botham led England in twelve Tests in 1980 and 1981 but he was unsuccessful, the team achieving no wins, eight draws and four defeats under his leadership. In addition, his form suffered and was eventually dismissed from the post, although he did actually resign just before the selectors were about to fire him. In Botham's defence, nine of his matches as captain were against West Indies, who afterwards won twelve of their next thirteen Tests against England. The other three were all against Australia.

In 1980, which was a wet summer, West Indies arguably had the better of all five Test matches, although, with the rain constantly intervening, they were able to win only one of them. West Indies won the first Test by only two wickets, and being at one stage 180/7 chasing a tricky 208. Rain saved England from a probable heavy defeat in the 2nd and 5th Tests: they fared better in between. In the 3rd, England conceded a first-innings lead of 110, but replied strongly in the second innings with a painstakingly slow and defensive 391/7, which would have resulted in a difficult target for the Windies had there been another day to chase it – but the third day had been rained off, and time ran out. In the Fourth Test, England picked up their only first-innings lead of the series – of 105 runs – but collapsed catastrophically in the second, before being saved by a century partnership for the last wicket between Willey (100*) and Willis (24*) to reach a total 201/9, and again the loss of a day and a half to rain left no time for the Windies to chase a potentially tough target above 300.

Botham had a poor season as a bowler and, in all first-class cricket, took just 40 wickets at the high average of 34.67 with a best return of only four for 38. He did better as a batsman, scoring 1,149 runs (the second time, after 1976, that he topped a thousand in a season) at 42.55: but this did not translate to form in the Tests. He completed two centuries and six other half-centuries for his county. His highest score in the season was ultimately the highest of his career: 228 for Somerset against Gloucestershire at Taunton in May. He batted for just over three hours, hitting 27 fours and ten sixes. With Gloucestershire batting out time for a draw on the final day, Somerset used all eleven players as bowlers. Apart from an innings of 57 in the first Test, Botham contributed little to England in the series and that innings was the only time he reached 50 in all his twelve Tests as England captain.

Somerset came close to retaining their JPL title in 1980 but had to be content with second place, only two points behind Warwickshire. They finished a credible fifth in the County Championship but were eliminated from both the Gillette and B&H Cups in the opening phase.

Botham led England on the controversial tour of the West Indies from January to April 1981. The second Test, scheduled to be played at Bourda, was cancelled after the Guyanese government revoking the visa of Robin Jackman because of his playing and coaching links with South Africa. The other four Tests were played and West Indies won the series 2–0 but England were helped by rain in the two drawn matches. Botham took the most wickets for England, but Wisden said "his bowling never recovered the full rhythm of a year before". His batting, however, apart from one good LOI performance in the first one-day international "was found wanting in technique, concentration and eventually in confidence". In Wisden's view, Botham's loss of form "could be cited as eloquent evidence of the undesirability of saddling a fast bowler and vital all-rounder with the extra burden of captaincy". The closest England came to a victory was in the first ODI, in which England bowled the West Indies out for 127 but, thanks to six wickets from Colin Croft, failed by two runs in the chase which was anchored by Botham's 60: this was, at the time, the lowest ODI total batting first to be successfully defended.

=== Somerset and England (1981) ===
The England captaincy had affected Botham's form as a player and in his last Test as captain, against Australia at Lord's in 1981, he was dismissed for a pair. According to Wisden editor Matthew Engel, writing in Cricinfo, Botham "resigned (a minute before being sacked), his form shot to pieces" after that match. Australia were then leading the series 1–0 after two Tests with four more to be played. Botham was replaced by the returning Mike Brearley, who had been his predecessor until retiring from Test cricket in 1980.

Botham continued to play for England under Brearley and achieved the highpoint of his career in the next three Tests as England recovered to win The Ashes. In the third Test at Headingley, Australia opened with 401 for 9 declared, despite good bowling by Botham who took 6 for 95. England responded poorly and were dismissed for 174. Botham was the only batsman to perform at all well and scored 50, which was his first Test half-century since he had been awarded the captaincy thirteen Tests earlier. Having been forced to follow-on, England collapsed again and at 135 for 7 on the afternoon of the fourth day, an innings defeat looked certain. Bookmakers had reportedly been offering odds of 500/1 against an England win after the follow-on was enforced. Botham, himself not long at the wicket, was the sole remaining recognised batsman as he was joined by the fast bowler Graham Dilley, number nine in the batting order, with only Chris Old and Bob Willis to come. With able support from Dilley (56) and Old (29), Botham hit out and by the close of play was 145 not out with Willis hanging on at the other end on 1 not out. England's lead was just 124 but there remained a glimmer of hope. On the final day's play, Botham reached 149 not out before Willis's wicket fell. Australia, with plenty of time remaining, needed 130 to win and were generally expected to get them; but after Botham took the first wicket, Willis took 8 for 43 to dismiss Australia for only 111. England had won by 18 runs; it was only the second time in history that a team following on had won a Test match.

Botham's outstanding form continued through the next two Tests. In the fourth at Edgbaston, a low-scoring match left Australia batting last and needing 151 to win. They reached 105 for 5 and were still favourites at that point but, in an inspired spell of bowling, Botham then took five wickets for only one run in 28 balls to give England victory by 29 runs. In the fifth Test at Old Trafford, Botham scored 118 in a partnership of 149 with Chris Tavaré before he was dismissed. He hit six sixes in that innings. England won that match to take a winning 3–1 series lead. The last Test at The Oval was drawn, Botham achieving a 10wM by taking six for 125 and four for 128. He was named Man of the Series after scoring 399 runs, taking 34 wickets and holding 12 catches.

Somerset won the Benson & Hedges Cup for the first time in 1981 and did well in the County Championship too, finishing third. They were again runners-up in the JPL, but a long way behind the winners Essex. In the renamed NatWest Trophy (formerly Gillette Cup), Somerset were knocked out in the second round. Botham played in the B&H final at Lord's, in which Somerset defeated Surrey by seven wickets. He took no wickets but provided Viv Richards (132 not out) with good support in the run chase. Botham ended the season with 67 wickets at 25.55, a best return of six for 90 (for Somerset v Sussex) and one 10wM (sixth Test). He scored 925 runs with a highest of 149* (third Test) at 42.04; and held 19 catches.

=== Somerset and England (1981–82 to 1983–84) ===
During this period, Botham played in 25 Tests. There were home series against both India and Pakistan in 1982; and New Zealand in 1983. His overseas tours were to India and Sri Lanka in 1981–82 (he took part in the inaugural Test played by Sri Lanka); to Australia in 1982–83; and to New Zealand and Pakistan in 1983–84. He played for England in the 1983 Cricket World Cup and was a member of their losing team in the semi-final.

Botham's return to India was less than triumphant and Wisden took him to task for his "ineffectiveness with the ball". Having achieved a match analysis of nine for 133 at Bombay, where England were beaten on a poor pitch, Botham took only eight more wickets, at 65 each, in the last five Tests and Wisden said this "was a telling blow to England's chance of levelling the series".

1982 was a good all-round season for Botham, especially as Somerset retained the Benson & Hedges Cup. In 17 first-class matches, he scored 1,241 runs with a highest of 208 against India (this was ultimately his career highest in Test cricket) at a good average of 44.32. He took 66 wickets at the low average of 22.98 with a best return of five for 46. England won their Test series against Pakistan by 2–1 and the one against India 1–0. Botham scored two centuries against India: 128 at Old Trafford and his career high 208 at The Oval. Somerset finished sixth and ninth in the County Championship and the JPL respectively. They reached the quarter-final of the NatWest Trophy and their season highlight was retaining the B&H Cup they won in 1981. In the final at Lord's, Somerset dismissed Nottinghamshire for only 130 (Botham two for 19) and won easily by nine wickets.

Botham toured Australia again in 1982–83 with England seeking to retain the Ashes, but Australia won the series 2–1 despite England winning, at the Melbourne Cricket Ground (MCG), a Test described by Wisden as "one of the most exciting Test matches ever played". Botham had a poor series and tour. He played in nine first-class matches and scored only 434 runs at the low average of 24.11 with a highest of 65. He was no better with the ball, taking just 29 wickets for a too-high 35.62 with a best return of four for 43. He did, however, field well and held 17 catches, nearly two a match.

Incidentally, it was during the subsequent ODI tournament – the annual Australian Tri-Series, at the time called the "World Series" – that Botham opened the batting for the first time in one-day cricket. Due to the fielding restrictions in force in that tournament (and for ODIs in Australia generally since 1980), only two fielders were permitted outside the 30 yard circle during the first ten overs (now called a Powerplay): and it was in the 9th match of the tournament, against Australia, that Botham opened the batting for the first time, with the idea that he was the batsman best equipped to hit the ball over the top. However, the tactic did not go as planned, Botham only scoring 19 and England losing the match. The tactic was more successful, two matches later against New Zealand with Botham scoring 65, but he was expensive with the ball as NZ chased the target successfully for the highest successful run-chase in ODIs at the time. England finished the tournament in third and last place and did not qualify for the finals.

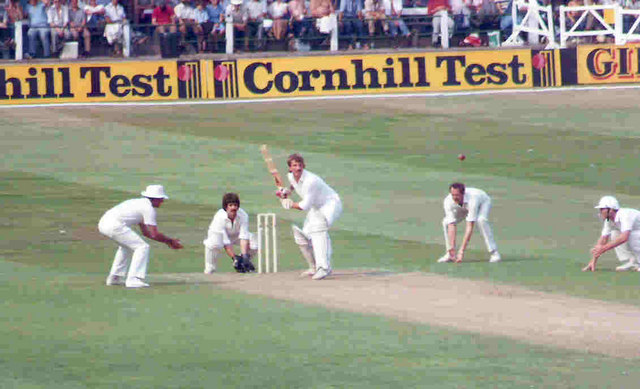
Botham batting at Trent Bridge, 1983

In the 1983 English season, Somerset won the NatWest Trophy for the first time, defeating Kent in the Lord's final by 24 runs with Botham as their captain. They were very close to taking the JPL title too but, having tied with Yorkshire on 46 points, they were placed second on run rate. In the County Championship, they won only three matches and finished tenth. They were knocked out of the B&H Cup early. Botham had a good season with the bat, scoring 852 runs in his 14 first-class matches at 40.57 with a highest score of 152 among three centuries. He did less well with the ball: only 22 wickets at the high average of 33.09. New Zealand played a four-match Test series against England after the World Cup and, at the 29th attempt, finally defeated England for the first time in a Test match in England. England won the other three matches convincingly, however, to take the series 3–1. Botham did little with the ball, the same story as in his whole season, but he did score a century (103) in the final Test at Trent Bridge (see photo).

In the winter of 1983–84, England toured New Zealand from January to February and Pakistan in March. Apart from one innings at Basin Reserve in the first Test against New Zealand, Botham was a disappointment on this tour, especially as a bowler. He scored 138 in the first Test, sharing in a sixth wicket partnership of 232 with Derek Randall (164), but the match was drawn. It was a poor tour for England, all told, and described by Wisden as "ranking among the unhappiest they have ever undertaken". England lost both series 1–0. Botham left Pakistan after the first Test there, the one England lost, to have a knee problem investigated at home.

=== Somerset and England (1984 to 1986–87) ===
After ten seasons as a first-team regular, Botham was appointed Somerset club captain in 1984 and 1985. In the County Championship, they finished seventh in 1984 and then dropped to 17th (bottom of the table) in 1985. In the JPL, they were 15th in 1984 and eleventh in 1985. They made little impression in either of the B&H Cup or the NatWest Trophy so, all in all, Botham's captaincy period was a lean time for the club who had enjoyed its most successful period ever in the preceding seasons.

Botham played in 18 Tests from 1984 to 1986, ten of them (five home, five away) against West Indies. Throughout Botham's Test career, the highest international standards were set by West Indies and Botham was generally unsuccessful against them. In both of these series, 1984 and 1985–86, West Indies beat England 5–0 in whitewashes that were dubbed "blackwash".

His highest score and both his best and worst bowling performances against West Indies occurred in the same match at Lord's in 1984. Clive Lloyd won the toss and, perhaps mistakenly, elected to field. The first day was rain-affected and England, 167 for two overnight, scored 286 after a century by Graeme Fowler; Botham scored a useful 30. West Indies lost three quick wickets, all of them to Botham who was a "reminder of his old self" in the words of Wisden, but recovered to reach 119 for three at the close of play on day two.

In the third morning, Viv Richards was dismissed by Botham under dubious circumstances but Botham was inspired by the capture of his friend's wicket and went on to take eight for 103, dismissing West Indies for 245 and for once giving England a chance of victory against the world's best team, with a first innings lead of 41. This was Botham's best-ever bowling performance against West Indies by some distance. England began their second innings and had been reduced to 88 for four when Botham joined Allan Lamb. They reached 114 for four at day three close. There was no Sunday play and England resumed on the Monday 155 runs ahead with six wickets standing. Botham and Lamb added 128 for the fifth wicket before Botham was out for 81, including nine fours and one six, easily his highest score and best innings against West Indies. Lamb made a century and England were all out on the Tuesday morning (final day) for exactly 300. West Indies needed 342 to win in five and a half hours. They lost Desmond Haynes to a run out at 57 for 0, whereupon Larry Gomes (92 not out) joined Gordon Greenidge (214 not out) and West Indies went on to win by nine wickets with 11.5 of the last twenty overs to spare.

Although Wisden does not name Botham except as an "inattentive" fielder who dropped a catch, it describes the England bowlers "looking second-rate and nobody but Willis bowling the right line or setting the right field to the powerful and phlegmatic Greenidge". Botham bowled the most overs, 20, and with nought for 117 he conceded almost a run a ball (Willis had nought for 48 from 15 overs). In mitigation, Wisden conceded that Greenidge played "the innings of his life, and his ruthless batting probably made the bowling look worse than it was".

Botham also played in the one-off Test against Sri Lanka: not bowling particularly well in the first innings although he took the first wicket (1/114 out of 491), and being dismissed for 6 as England batted (370). Toward the end of Sri Lanka's second innings as the match meandered to a draw, in absolutely ferocious heat Botham dispensed with his usual fast bowler's long run-up and switched to bowling off-spin off a few paces, surprising everybody (himself included) by taking several wickets with it, out of an analysis of 6/90. He decided to take a rest over the winter, and sit out of the 1984–85 tour of India.

In 1985, Botham played in all six Tests against a poor Australian team as England, themselves a second-rate team based on their recent performances, comfortably regained the Ashes and he was the leading wicket-taker, but the series was dominated by England's specialist batsmen, especially Mike Gatting and David Gower. Botham, who by this time had adopted a dyed blonde mullet haircut as a trademark, contributed relatively little with the bat, compared with the massive totals amassed by Gower, Gatting, Graham Gooch and Tim Robinson. He scored 250 runs at 31.25 with a highest of 85. He did take the most wickets (31 at 27.58 with a best of five for 109) but he was rarely impressive and he was bowling to a weak batting team, Allan Border apart. England's best bowler was Richard Ellison who played only twice and took 17 wickets at only 10.88 with a best of six for 77 and one 10wM.

Botham was suspended for 63 days by the Test and County Cricket Board in 1986 after he admitted in an interview that he had smoked cannabis. Due to the ban, Botham played in only one Test which was the final one of the series against New Zealand. He made his mark on that Test though: beginning it by taking the wicket of Bruce Edgar with his very first delivery, to go level with Dennis Lillee on 355 as holder of the world record for Test wickets. The next delivery was edged through the slip cordon by Jeff Crowe. Botham went past the mark in his second over to hold the record outright, by trapping Crowe leg-before. Then on the fourth day of the match, coming in after centuries from Gatting and Gower, he bashed a quickfire half-century in just 32 balls, including 24 off one over from Derek Stirling – equalling the record at the time, for most runs off an over in Tests... a record which he was responsible for, but from the opposite, having conceded 24 runs to Andy Roberts back in the 1980/81 tour of the West Indies. England declared with a massive first-innings lead, but rain came after lunch on the fourth day and only one further over was bowled.

Botham was succeeded by Peter Roebuck as Somerset captain for 1986 but, during the season, tensions arose in the Somerset dressing room which eventually exploded into a full-scale row and resulted in the sacking by the club of Botham's friends Viv Richards and Joel Garner. Botham, who supported Richards and Garner, decided to resign at the end of the season. 1986 was not a season for Botham to remember except for one brilliant List A innings when he made his career highest score in the limited overs form of 175 not out for Somerset against Northamptonshire in a 39-over JPL match at the Wellingborough School ground. It was to no avail, however, as the weather intervened and the game ended in no result. His innings remains a ground record.

Botham's final tour of Australia was in 1986/87 under Mike Gatting's captaincy. He played in four Tests and England won the Ashes for the last time until 2005. In many ways, the series was also Botham's last hurrah because he scored his final Test century (138 in the first Test at Brisbane which England won by seven wickets) and took his final Test 5wI (five for 41 in the fourth Test at the MCG which England won by an innings and 14 runs). Wisden pointed out that although Botham had a modest series statistically, "he was an asset to the side" because of his enthusiasm and "going out of his way to encourage younger players, especially Phil DeFreitas".

Botham suffered a severe rib injury in the Second Test in Perth, which kept him out of the 3rd Test entirely and reduced the pace of his bowling for the remainder of the tour as he tried to manage it: as a result, with reasonable success, he changed his bowling style to a defensive, miserly military-medium pace. England also won the two one-day tournaments, the one-off Benson & Hedges Perth Challenge (against Australia, West Indies and Pakistan) and the World Series (against Australia and Windies): Botham produced several match-winning performances with both bat and ball despite being not fully fit, and was Man of the Match in both matches of the best-of-three final of the World Series – with the bat in the first, opening the batting for 71 (scored out of 91 while he was at the crease), and with the ball in the second, for a particularly miserly spell which also took three wickets as England defended a low total by nine runs, to win the finals 2–0. Once again, thanks to the fielding restrictions in place for the World Series tournament, Botham opened the batting - a tactic that had been trialled in the 1982-3 tour: the tactic met with mixed success in the group stages, but it came good in the final.

=== Worcestershire and England (1987 to 1991) ===
After his resignation from Somerset, Botham joined Worcestershire for the 1987 season and spent five seasons with them. In 1987, he scored 126* against his old county but otherwise he was more successful as a limited overs batsman, scoring two centuries and averaging 40.94. His bowling too was much better in the shorter form, wherein he averaged 21.29 against 42.04 in first-class. His limited overs efforts helped Worcestershire to win the Sunday League. They finished ninth in the County Championship and were unsuccessful in the two knockout trophies. Worcestershire, taking a leaf from England's winter tactic, sometimes used Botham to open the batting in one-day matches, in partnership with regular opener Tim Curtis.

Botham played in the five 1987 Tests against Pakistan, the last time he represented England in a full series. He scored 232 runs in the series with one half-century (51*) at 33.14; and took only seven wickets which were enormously expensive. Pakistan won by an innings at Headingley with the other four Tests drawn, although England were in superior positions in the First and Fourth tests which lost much time to rain, and only narrowly failed to level the series in the Fourth, running out of overs chasing a small target. When Pakistan totalled 708 at The Oval, the 217 runs conceded by Botham, from 52 overs, were the most by an England bowler, passing the 204 by Ian Peebles, from 71 overs, against Australia at The Oval in 1930, although he took three wickets and also ran out Imran Khan. The half-century, his final and by far his slowest Test fifty, was a dogged, defensive effort occupying most of the last day in a drawn match, in an unbroken partnership with Gatting (150*) to save the 5th test and keep England's margin of defeat at 1–0. He declined to go on tour with England the following winter, either for the 1987 World Cup in India and Pakistan (in which England reached the final) or for the subsequent tours of Pakistan (lost 1–0) and New Zealand (a rain-ruined 0–0 drawn series).

Botham spent the 1987–88 Australian season with Queensland, playing for them in the Sheffield Shield. Queensland were one of the better state teams in the 1980s and were always in the Shield's top three from the 1983–84 season through to the 1990–91 season, but didn't win it. In Botham's season there, his teammates including Allan Border (captain), wicketkeeper Ian Healy and pace bowler Craig McDermott, they finished second to Western Australia. Botham scored several half-centuries and took a reasonable number of wickets and helped Queensland make the Sheffield Shield final. Botham and Dennis Lillee were fined for damaging the Queensland dressing room in Launceston, Tasmania during a one-day match. When the Queensland team flew to Perth for the Shield final, Botham was involved in an altercation where he allegedly assaulted a fellow airline passenger who had intervened in an argument between the Queensland players. Queensland lost the final. Botham was fined $800 by a magistrate and $5,000 by the Australian Cricket Board. He was consequently sacked by Queensland.

Botham was unfit for most of the 1988 season and played in only four first-class and seven limited overs matches during April and May. He did not play for England. Nevertheless, Worcestershire won both the County Championship and the Sunday League. Botham was out of action for eleven months, having had an operation to fuse vertebrae in his spine in response to a long-standing back problem.

He returned in May 1989 and, bowling well in the County Championship, helped Worcestershire to a second successive title. With England struggling against Allan Border's rebuilt Australian team which featured the likes of Healy, McDermott, Steve Waugh, Merv Hughes and Mark Taylor, Botham was recalled for the third, fourth and fifth Tests of the pivotal Ashes 1989 series. He could do little to stem a tide which had now turned completely in Australia's favour and looked completely out of his depth. He scored only 62 runs at the very low average of 15.50 – two-thirds of them in one innings – and took just three wickets at an enormously expensive 80.33. The summer of 1989 saw more controversy for England with the organisation of a rebel tour to South Africa, all participants being banned for three years: Botham declined the rebel tour, hoping to be selected for the winter tour of the West Indies, only to be dropped for his poor form.

Another two-year absence from international cricket ensued until he was recalled again to play against West Indies in 1991, on the strength of belting 161* for Worcestershire against them in their early-season tour match against the county – it was to be his only century ever against the West Indies. He was selected for the early-season ODI series at first: he took a wicket in his first over, and four in his ten-over spell, but later tore a hamstring, going for a quick single while batting. He could have retired hurt, but opted to continue with a runner, only to be dismissed by the next delivery. The injury put him out of the remaining ODIs (both won by England) and the first couple of Tests (which England won and drew to lead 1–0): then, on his comeback in a county match, another injury caused him to be unavailable for the 3rd and 4th Tests (both lost by England).

He was recalled for the 5th Test with England needing a victory to tie the series: batting in the first innings, he scored a respectable 31 before attempting to hook Curtly Ambrose and being dismissed "hit wicket", in circumstances which caused an infamous giggling fit in the BBC Test Match Special radio commentary box. Used sparingly with the ball, he took 1/27 and 2/40 as West Indies were bowled out, forced to follow on and bowled out again, by Tufnell (6/25) and Lawrence (5/106) in the first and second innings respectively. His only Test victory against the Windies was completed when he himself hit the winning runs – a boundary off his first delivery – as England chased a target of 143 with five wickets to spare, and tied the series. Two weeks later, he played against Sri Lanka at Lord's, achieving little of note. He helped Worcestershire to win the B&H Cup for the only time in 1991.

=== Durham and England (1991–92 to 1993) ===
Botham's final tour was to Australia and New Zealand in 1991–92. In the tour of NZ, he played in only the last Test, and the one-day series: his most notable contribution was his highest ODI score of 79, opening the batting, in which he seemed to be set fair to finally reach a century in an ODI, but NZ managed to keep him away from the strike for several overs, he ran out of patience, slogged a delivery straight up in the air and was caught. After this came the World Cup in Australia. Botham had not previously won any man of the match awards in the World Cup, but in this competition he won two. Against India at the WACA Ground, he bowled tightly and restricted India, needing 237, to only 27 runs from his ten overs, an economy rate of 2.70 which was significantly lower than anyone else's. He captured two wickets and one of them was Sachin Tendulkar. England won by nine runs.

Against Australia at Sydney Cricket Ground later in the competition, Botham won the award for the sort of all-round performance which had made his reputation. Australia won the toss and decided to bat first. They scored 171 all out in 49 overs and Botham took four for 31 in his ten. He then opened the England innings with Graham Gooch – the tactic England had trialled in Australia five years before, and again in the ODIs against NZ at the end of the tour before the World Cup – and scored 53 from only 77 balls in a partnership with Gooch of 107. England went on to win by eight wickets with nine overs to spare. He was less successful in the final, where previously economical bowling figures were ruined by a late assault from the Pakistani batting line-up, and then he was given out caught-behind for a duck (perhaps unfortunately, since he appeared not to have touched the ball according to the camera replays) in Wasim Akram's first over, England losing the match.

In 1992, Botham joined County Championship newcomers Durham, scoring a century in the second innings in their inaugural first-class match against Leicestershire: and he played in the first two Tests against Pakistan, the second one at Lord's being his final Test appearance. Botham scored 2 and 6, cheaply dismissed each time by the pace of Waqar Younis. As a bowler, he was used for only five overs in the first innings, his final Test return being none for nine: he did not bowl in Pakistan's second innings, due to a foot injury sustained while batting, although he fielded at slip. England lost the match by two wickets and Pakistan went on to win the series 2–1.

Botham did however play in the ODI series, in all five matches, which England won 4–1: these were his last international matches. England's batting was so dominant in all but one of the matches, that Botham only came in right at the end of the innings, or not at all, reverting to his old place in the middle order, and he had little to do: except in the 4th match, where he opened the batting again (in Gooch's absence) and scored a respectable and workmanlike 40, but saw England lose their last four wickets for ten runs and the match by three runs. His bowling was similarly unremarkable, usually capturing one or two wickets at about four an over: he neither scored a run (did not bat) nor took a wicket (0–43) in his final match.

In 1992 Botham was appointed an Officer of the Order of the British Empire (OBE) for services to cricket and for his charity work in the Queen's Birthday Honours.

Botham retired from cricket midway through the 1993 season, his last match being for Durham against the visiting Australians at The Racecourse 17–19 July 1993. Durham batted first and scored 385 for eight declared (Wayne Larkins 151). In his final first-class innings, Botham scored 32. In reply, Australia could only make 221, due to Simon Brown who took seven for 70 (Botham none for 21). Being 164 behind, Australia had to follow on and a victory for Durham was possible but centuries by Matthew Hayden and David Boon saved Australia and the match was drawn. Botham's final bowling return was none for 45 from eleven overs. In the final over of the game, Botham also kept wicket, without wearing gloves or pads.

== Records in international cricket ==
A graph showing Botham's Test career bowling statistics and how they have varied over time

Botham's Test career spanned 16 seasons and he played in 102 matches. He scored 5,200 runs at an average of 33.54 with a highest score of 208 in his 14 centuries. He took 383 wickets at an average of 28.40 with a best return of eight for 34 and achieved ten wickets in a match four times. He held 120 catches.

In 116 LOIs from 1976 to 1992, he scored 2,113 runs with a highest score of 79; took 145 wickets with a best return of four for 31; and held 36 catches. A straight comparison of these totals with those of his Test career reveal that he was less effective in the limited overs form of the game. He did have some outstanding LOI matches, however, winning six man of the match awards. Botham took part in three editions of the Cricket World Cup: 1979, 1983 and 1992. He played in 22 World Cup matches including the finals in 1979 and 1992, both of which England lost, and he was in England's losing team in the 1983 semi-final.

Botham was the 21st player to achieve the "double" of 1,000 runs and 100 wickets in Test cricket and he went on to score 5,200 runs and take 383 wickets, as well as holding 120 catches.

He held the world record for the greatest number of Test wickets from 21 August 1986 to 12 November 1988. His predecessor was Dennis Lillee who had retired with 355 wickets in 70 matches. Botham extended the record to 373 in 94 matches before he was overtaken by Richard Hadlee. Botham ended with 383 wickets in 102 matches while Hadlee extended the record to 431 in 86 matches. See List of Test cricket records#Career.

As described above, Botham in 1980 became the second player to achieve the "match double" of 100 runs and ten wickets in Test cricket, following Alan Davidson in 1960–61. Botham was, however, the first to score a century and take ten wickets in a Test match (Davidson scored 44 and 80). The century and ten double has since been achieved by Imran Khan who scored 117 and took six for 98 and five for 82 against India at the Iqbal Stadium in Faisalabad in January 1983., and again by Shakib Al Hasan for Bangladesh against Zimbabwe at Khulna in 2014.

== List of Test centuries and five-wicket innings ==
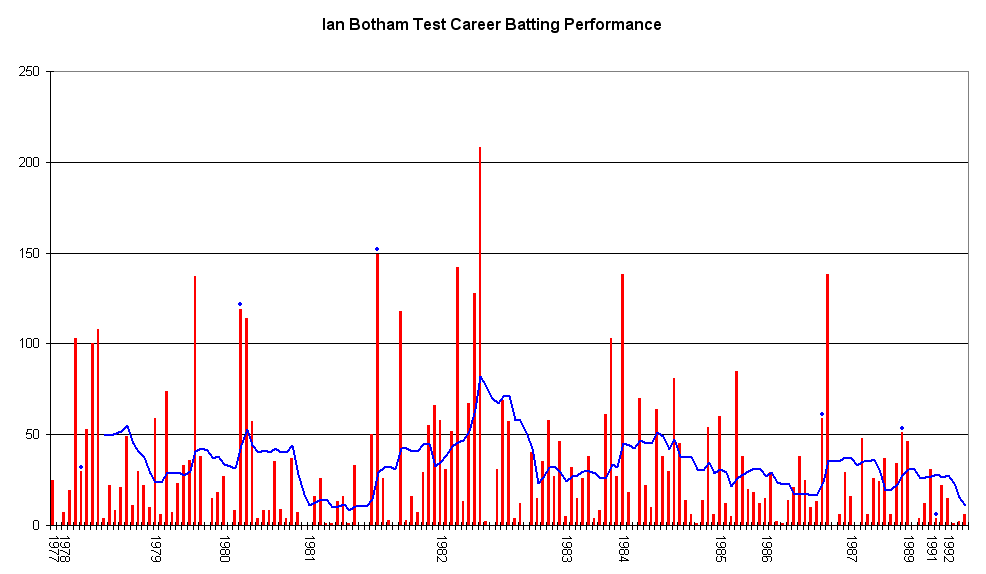
Botham's Test career performance graph

Of note, Botham's first 202 wickets came at 21.20 per wicket, while his final 181 cost on average 36.43 apiece; the first average is one that would make Botham one of the greatest bowlers of the modern era, ranking alongside the West Indian greats Curtly Ambrose (career average 20.99), Malcolm Marshall (career average 20.94), and Joel Garner (career average 20.97), but the second average depicts a player who, as a specialist bowler, would be unable to sustain a place in many Test teams. This difference can be largely attributed to the longer term effects of a back injury he sustained in 1980; this limited his bowling pace and his ability to swing the ball.

Botham's batting – although never the equal of his bowling abilities – declined as well, with a batting average of 38.80 for his first 51 Tests substantially higher than the 28.87 he managed in his last 51 Tests, again a number that would be considered unsatisfactory for a specialist batsman in most Test teams. In the first 5 years of Botham's Test career, when not playing as captain, he scored 2,557 runs at an average of 49.17 including 11 centuries and a highest score of 208, took 196 wickets at an average of 21.28 including nineteen 5 wicket hauls and held 50 catches. Such figures denote a player who would easily maintain a place in any Test team as a specialist batsman or bowler alone. During this period his reputation as one of the leading Test all-rounders was firmly established.

== Style and technique ==
Botham had an affinity with Brian Close, his first county captain who became a mentor to him, as they shared a determination to do well and win matches. Wisden has commented on another shared characteristic: "outstanding courage", mainly because Botham would readily field anywhere, generally in the slips but also in dangerous positions near the batsman and he was a brilliant fielder. As a batsman, Botham was often wrongly labelled by the tabloid press as a "big hitter" (effectively implying that he was a "slogger") but, while it is true that his strength enabled him to drive a ball for six and his courage to hook one for six, Botham actually had a very correct batting style as he stood side-on and played straight: Wisden praised his "straight hitting and square cutting".

Botham might not have been good enough to retain a regular England place as a specialist batsman (his Test career batting average was a fairly modest 33.54) but as a bowler who was capable of taking 383 Test wickets, he certainly would. Wisden praised Tom Cartwright for helping to develop Botham's technique as a swing bowler and, by the time he made his Test debut in 1977, Botham had mastered change of pace, the outswinger and the fast inswinging yorker, all formidable parts of his repertoire which eventually enabled him to break the world Test wicket record.

Writing in Barclays World of Cricket (1986), former England captain Tony Lewis commented on Botham's strength, enthusiasm and aggression "which he took into every game". Lewis, however, said that Botham's exuberance often reduced the efficiency of his play, in that he would take too many risks or refuse to give up on a bowling tactic despite ongoing heavy cost. He summarised Botham as an exciting cricketer who lacked self-discipline. Botham was in the middle of his career when the book was published, but Lewis emphasised the speed at which Botham had achieved certain milestones such as 1,000 runs and 100 wickets in Test cricket. At that time there seemed no reason why Botham should not go on reaching milestones, but he had already peaked and, in retrospect, his career had a meteoric aspect. His rival Imran Khan said: "Botham was someone who I don't think ever did justice to his talent. When he started he could have done anything, but he declined very quickly. In a way our careers were the opposite of each other. I started quite slowly but got better, maximised my talent. He went the other way, I think".

== Legacy ==
Botham's career and ability level has been oft-debated. For example, when naming him as a Cricketer of the Year in its 1978 edition, Wisden described Botham as "a determined character who knows where he is aiming, and who will, quite naturally and fiercely, address himself to the interesting view that he is overrated". Denis Compton would dismiss Botham as "overrated" and said he "only did well because all the best players had joined Packer": i.e., for World Series Cricket (WSC).

Botham would readily give praise to his colleagues, for instance, his batting partners Hallam Moseley and Bob Clapp after the 1974 Benson and Hedges quarter-final against Hampshire; and to Bob Willis, the man whose bowling spell won the test match at Headingley in 1981.

The Richards–Botham Trophy, set to replace the Wisden Trophy for winners of West Indies–England Test series, is named in honour of Botham and Viv Richards.

== Libel cases brought against Imran Khan (1994–1996) ==
In 1994, the year after he retired, Botham became embroiled in a legal dispute with Imran Khan who, in an article for India Today, had accused Botham and Allan Lamb of bringing cricket into disrepute. Botham and Lamb instigated a libel action in response. The case was heard at the High Court in 1996 with the court choosing to hear on the second day a separate action brought solely by Botham against Khan, who had suggested in a newspaper article that Botham had been involved in ball-tampering. This would become the subject of a court case later on, one that Khan would go on to win. Botham was liable for all expenses in the court case in the ruling, including those incurred by Khan.

== Football career ==
Botham was a talented footballer but, believing he was better at cricket, he chose the latter for his full-time career. Even so, he played football as a centre-half from 1978 to 1985 for Yeovil Town and Scunthorpe United. He made eleven appearances in the Football League for Scunthorpe. While with Yeovil, Botham made an appearance for the Football Association XI (a representative team for non-League footballers) against the Northern Football League at Croft Park during the 1984–85 season.

== Charity fundraising ==
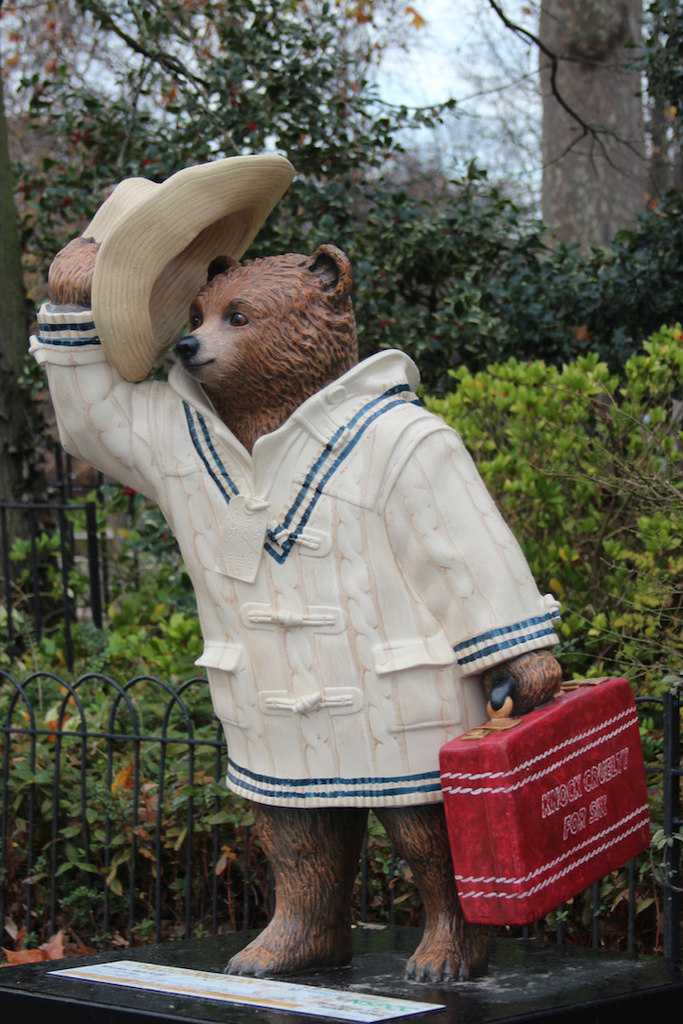
Botham's Paddington Bear statue—themed "Sticky Wicket"—in Regent's Park, London, auctioned to raise funds for the NSPCC

Botham has been a prodigious fundraiser for charitable causes, undertaking a total of 12 long-distance charity walks. His first, in 1985, was a 900-mile trek from John o' Groats to Land's End. His efforts were inspired after a visit to Taunton's Musgrove Park Hospital in 1977 while receiving treatment for a broken toe. When he took a wrong turn into a children's ward, he was devastated to learn that some of the children had only weeks to live, and why. At the time he was an expectant father. Since then his efforts have raised more than £12 million for charity, with leukaemia research the main cause to benefit. In recognition of this work, Botham in 2003 became the first-ever President of Bloodwise, the UK's leading blood cancer charity. In November 2014, Botham designed a Paddington Bear statue, one of fifty created by various celebrities which were located around London prior to the release of the film Paddington, with the statues auctioned to raise funds for the National Society for the Prevention of Cruelty to Children (NSPCC).

On 10 October 2007, Botham was invested a Knight Bachelor by Queen Elizabeth II at Buckingham Palace, having been appointed in the Queen's Birthday Honours "for services to Charity and to Cricket".

== Media career ==
After retiring from cricket, Botham became involved in the media and has worked as an analyst and commentator for Sky Sports for many years. Unlike Fred Trueman and others, he does not hark back to "in my day". Wisden editor Matthew Engel remarked on Botham's calmness, wit and sagacity as a TV commentator, though admitting he was surprised by it.

On 9 August 2009, while commentating on the fourth Ashes Test at Headingley that season, Botham was invited to take part in an on-field ceremony to induct him into the ICC Cricket Hall of Fame along with former Yorkshire players Geoffrey Boycott, Wilfred Rhodes and Fred Trueman. Boycott was also in attendance, along with Fred Trueman's widow Veronica and Colin Graves who, as Yorkshire County Cricket Club chairman, accepted the honour on behalf of Wilfred Rhodes. Botham said: "To be named amongst 55 of the most prolific players in cricketing history is a great honour for me. To have my cricketing career recognised in the ICC Cricket Hall of Fame is not something I would have thought when I began playing cricket but to be receiving this award today is something I'm extremely grateful for". Colin Graves included Botham in his tribute to Rhodes when he said: "It is a great honour to accept the cap on behalf of a Yorkshire legend. Wilfred Rhodes was an exceedingly gifted player and is rightly regarded as one of England's greatest all-rounders. I am also delighted to see two other great Yorkshiremen and another great all-rounder inducted into the ICC Cricket Hall of Fame today".

He was the subject of This Is Your Life in 1981 when he was surprised by Eamonn Andrews during a meeting at Lord's.

On 12 August 1995, Botham was interviewed at length by Andrew Neil on his one-on-one interview show Is This Your Life? for Channel 4.

In 2008 he received an honorary doctorate from the University of Bath.

== Peerage ==
Botham was nominated by Boris Johnson for a life peerage in the 2020 Political Honours, it being widely reported that the honour was a reward for his support for Brexit. He was created Baron Botham, of Ravensworth in the County of North Yorkshire on 10 September and took the oath and his seat on 5 October 2020. Botham made his maiden speech on 3 November 2020, and since then has made one further spoken contribution on 25 November 2020 regarding funding in sport, but as of November 2024, no further spoken contributions have been made since. While Botham made 61 attendances in 2020, this dropped to two attendances in 2022. As of November 2024, the parliamentary record shows his last vote in the House of Lords was in July 2021.

On 23 August 2021, Boris Johnson appointed him the UK's Trade Envoy to Australia.

== Personal life ==
Botham is colour blind. In 1976, in Doncaster, Botham married Kathryn ("Kathy") Waller (now Lady Botham) whom he first met in June 1974. They lived in Epworth, near Scunthorpe, until the late 1980s. They have one son, Liam (born August 1977), and two daughters. The family now live in Ravensworth in North Yorkshire, and also own property in Almería, where Botham frequently plays golf.

Botham is an avid trout and salmon fisherman. As a result, he was invited to present a TV series called Botham on the Fly. He has also been a team captain on the BBC series A Question of Sport.

Besides angling and golf, Botham enjoys game shooting and owns a grouse moor. This has resulted in a high-profile dispute with the Royal Society for the Protection of Birds (RSPB). In August 2016, he called for Chris Packham to be sacked by the BBC as part of a campaign funded by the grouse shooting industry, after Packham had highlighted the industry's involvement in the illegal killing of endangered species of birds of prey.

According to the New Statesman in 2015, "Botham is an old-fashioned Englishman [...] he is conservative with a small and upper-case C" and "a robust monarchist". Botham was a staunch supporter of the UK's withdrawal from the European Union. He was quoted as saying: "Personally, I think that England is an island. I think that England should be England. And I think that we should keep that." He appeared at a number of pro-Leave campaign events in the run-up to the UK's EU membership referendum in 2016.

Botham's private life has also made occasional dramatic appearances in Britain's tabloid newspapers, with at least one extra-marital affair prompting a public apology to his wife Kathy. He also fell out publicly with other players, including fellow England player Geoff Boycott, Somerset captain Peter Roebuck, and Australian batsman Ian Chappell, with whom he had an altercation in an Adelaide Oval car park during the 2010–11 Ashes series. Although Botham hoped to resolve his long-running feud with Chappell during a Channel 9 documentary on 27 June 2023, Chappell refused.

== Bibliography ==
- Barclays (1986). Swanton, E. W. (ed.). Barclays World of Cricket. Willow Books. ISBN 0-00-218193-2.
- Ian Botham; Kenneth Gregory (1982). Botham's Choice. Collins. ISBN 978-0-00-216490-0.
- Ian Botham (1994). My Autobiography: Don't Tell Kath. HarperCollins.
- Ian Botham; Dennis Coath (1996). Deep Cover. HarperCollins. ISBN 978-0-00-649827-8.
- Ian Botham (2007). Ian Botham: My Illustrated Life. Cassell. ISBN 978-1-84403-585-4.
- Ian Botham (2008). Head on: The Autobiography. Ebury Press. ISBN 978-0-09-192149-1.
- Ian Botham (2010). On Fishing: At Sea, Being Coarse, on the Fly. Orion. ISBN 978-0-7538-2633-1.
- Ian Botham (2011). Botham's Book of the Ashes: A Lifetime Love Affair with Cricket's Greatest Rivalry. Mainstream Publishing. ISBN 978-1-84596-905-9.
- Dave Bowler (1997). No Surrender: The Life and Times of Ian Botham. Orion. ISBN 978-0-7528-0803-1.
- Doust, Dudley (1981). Ian Botham, the great all-rounder. St Albans, Hertfordshire: Granada. ISBN 0-583-13452-1. OCLC 7247566.
- Farmer, Bob (1979). Ian Botham. Feltham, Middlesex: Hamlyn. ISBN 0-600-34917-9. OCLC 6145706.
- James, C. L. R. (1993). Beyond A Boundary. Duke University Press. ISBN 0822313839.
- Frank Keating (1986). High, Wide and Handsome: Ian Botham, the Story of a Very Special Year. Willow Books. ISBN 978-0-00-218226-3.
- Mosey, Don (1986). Botham. London: Guild Publishing. ISBN 0-413-40780-2. OCLC 14131072.
- Murphy, Patrick (1988). Botham: a biography. London: J. M. Dent & Sons. ISBN 0-460-04725-6. OCLC 17777058.
- Nyren, John (1998). Ashley Mote (ed.). The Cricketers of my Time. Robson.

Sporting positions
Preceded by Brian Rose	Somerset County Cricket Captain; 1984–1985	Succeeded by Peter Roebuck
Preceded by Mike Brearley	English national cricket captain 1980–1981	Succeeded by Mike Brearley
Records
Preceded by Dennis Lillee	World Record – Most Career Wickets in Test cricket 373 wickets (27.86) in 102 Tests; Held record 21 August 1986 to 12 November 1988	Succeeded by Richard Hadlee
Orders of precedence in the United Kingdom
Preceded by The Lord Moylan	Gentlemen; Baron Botham	Followed by The Lord Sikka
