= Doust =

Doust is an English-language surname. Notable people with the surname include:

- Kate Doust (born 1962), Australian politician
- Jon Doust, Australian comedian, writer, novelist and professional speaker from Western Australia
- Matt Doust (1984–2013), American-born Australian hyper-realistic artist
- Dudley Doust (1930–2008), American sportswriter
- Russell Doust (1927–2025), Australian librarian
- Stanley Doust (1879–1961), Australian tennis player

== See also ==
- Sentenac-d'Oust, commune in the Ariège department in south-western France
- Heber Doust Curtis (1872–1942), American astronomer
