= Bucklers Mead Academy =

Location
- St John's Road; Yeovil, Somerset, BA21 4NH (SAT NAV BA21 4FE); England; 50.9566°N 2.6233°W

Information
- Type: Academy
- Motto: Educating with care to succeed
- Established: 1957 (school built)
- Specialist: Technology College
- Department for Education URN: 148830 Tables
- Ofsted: Reports
- Head teacher: Mark Lawrence
- Gender: Mixed
- Age: 11 to 16
- Enrolment: 906 as of 2014
- Houses: Vixens (orange), Sea Kings (blue), Wildcatts (red), Merlin (purple), Lynx (green), Harrier (yellow)
- Colours: Purple & Black
- Website: bucklersmead.com

Buckler's Mead Academy is a secondary school and specialist Technology College in Yeovil, Somerset, England. As of 2014, it has 907 students between the ages of 11 and 16. The school offers a range of subjects including art, beliefs and values, citizenship, drama, geography, history, mathematics, modern foreign languages, music, physical education and technology. In August 2011, the school became an academy.

== Ofsted inspection judgements ==
The school was inspected by Ofsted in 2019, with a judgement of Inadequate. As of 2026, its most recent inspection was in 2024, with a judgement of Good.
