= Dudley Doust =

American journalist

Dudley Allen Doust (17 January 1930 – 13 January 2008) was an American-born sports journalist and author who in addition to publishing a number of books wrote for The Kansas City Star, Time and The Sunday Times.

== Biography ==
Born in Syracuse, New York on 17 January 1930, the son of a paediatrician, Doust had no desire to enter into the medical profession like his father. He had his heart set on writing, and attended the University of Rochester and then spent a year studying journalism at Stanford University. His first job in journalism was with The Kansas City Star, before he later joined Time as a foreign correspondent. He was assigned to London to report on arts and theatre, and it was during this time that he met his wife, Jane Ingram. His next assignment was to Mexico City, but when this was completed, rather than return to base, he moved, along with his wife and daughter to a mud hut in Valle de Bravo in Mexico, with the aim of writing a novel. The stay did not last long, and an old colleague from Time enticed him to move to London to work as a sports writer for The Sunday Times. He began writing "Inside Track", a column in which he wrote sports diaries, writing about subjects which most writers would actively avoid. Upon the retirement of Henry Longhurst, he became golf correspondent for the paper, and worked for a short time in 1989 as sports editor of the Sunday Correspondent. When that paper ceased publication the year after, Doust became a freelance writer, which gave him more time to work on a number of sports books. He died from cancer aged 77 on 13 January 2008.

== Publications ==
- The return of the Ashes. London: Pelham Books. 1978. ISBN 0-7207-1066-9. OCLC 4640956. (with Mike Brearley)
- The Ashes retained. London: Hodder & Stoughton. 1979. ISBN 0-340-24191-8. OCLC 6329897. (with Mike Brearley)
- Ian Botham, the great all-rounder. St Albans, Hertfordshire: Granada. 1981. ISBN 0-583-13452-1. OCLC 7247566.
- Seve: the Young Champion. London: Hodder & Stoughton. 1989. ISBN 0-340-50888-4. OCLC 20565309.
- 221: Peter Scudamore's record season. London: Hodder & Stoughton. 1992. ISBN 0-340-55900-4. OCLC 26720744.
- Sports beat: headline-makers, then and now. London: Hodder & Stoughton. 1992. ISBN 0-340-55900-4. OCLC 26720744.
- Bradley Brook: an American walks down an English stream. Bath, Somerset: Fairfield Books. 2009. ISBN 978-0-9560702-2-7. OCLC 318879892. (with Scyld Berry)
