= Bob Clapp =

English cricketer

Personal information
- Full name: Robert John Clapp
- Born: 12 December 1948 (age 77); Weston-super-Mare, Somerset, England
- Batting: Right-handed
- Bowling: Right-arm medium
- Role: Bowler

Domestic team information
- Years: Team
- 1972–1977: Somerset
- First-class debut: 26 August 1972 Somerset v Kent
- Last First-class: 29 June 1977 Somerset v Sussex
- List A debut: 3 June 1973 Somerset v Middlesex
- Last List A: 30 May 1976 Somerset v Hampshire

Career statistics
Competition	FC	LA
Matches	15	39
Runs scored	49	24
Batting average	4.45	3.42
100s/50s	0/0	0/0
Top score	32	8*
Balls bowled	1495	1841
Wickets	25	76
Bowling average	29.36	17.00
5 wickets in innings	0	1
10 wickets in match	0	n/a
Best bowling	3/15	5/38
Catches/stumpings	1/–	11/–
- Source: CricketArchive, 4 April 2010

Robert John Clapp, known as Bob Clapp (born 12 December 1948 in Weston-Super-Mare, Somerset, England) is a former English cricketer.

He played first-class cricket for Somerset County Cricket Club between 1972 and 1977 but was more prolific in one-day cricket. A right-arm medium pace bowler, Clapp holds the record for the most List A wickets in one season for Somerset, with the 51 that he claimed in 1974. In the same year he also broke the record for the most wickets taken in a season in the John Player league (34).

However, Clapp only played 15 first-class matches for Somerset. His 25 first-class wickets were taken at an average of 29.36. Despite his successful 1974 season, Clapp enjoyed only mediocre success in his other seasons of one-day cricket. He claimed 25 wickets in his three other seasons. In 1977, the bulk of Clapp's cricket was for Somerset's Second XI, and he retired from county cricket at the end of the 1979 season.
